= List of Anolis lizards =

The large lizard genus Anolis contains around 436 accepted anole (US: /əˈnoʊ.li/) species, which have been considered in a number of subgroups, or clades such as carolinensis and isolepis.

Nota bene: In the following list, a taxon authority in parentheses indicates that the species was originally described in a different genus.

== A ==
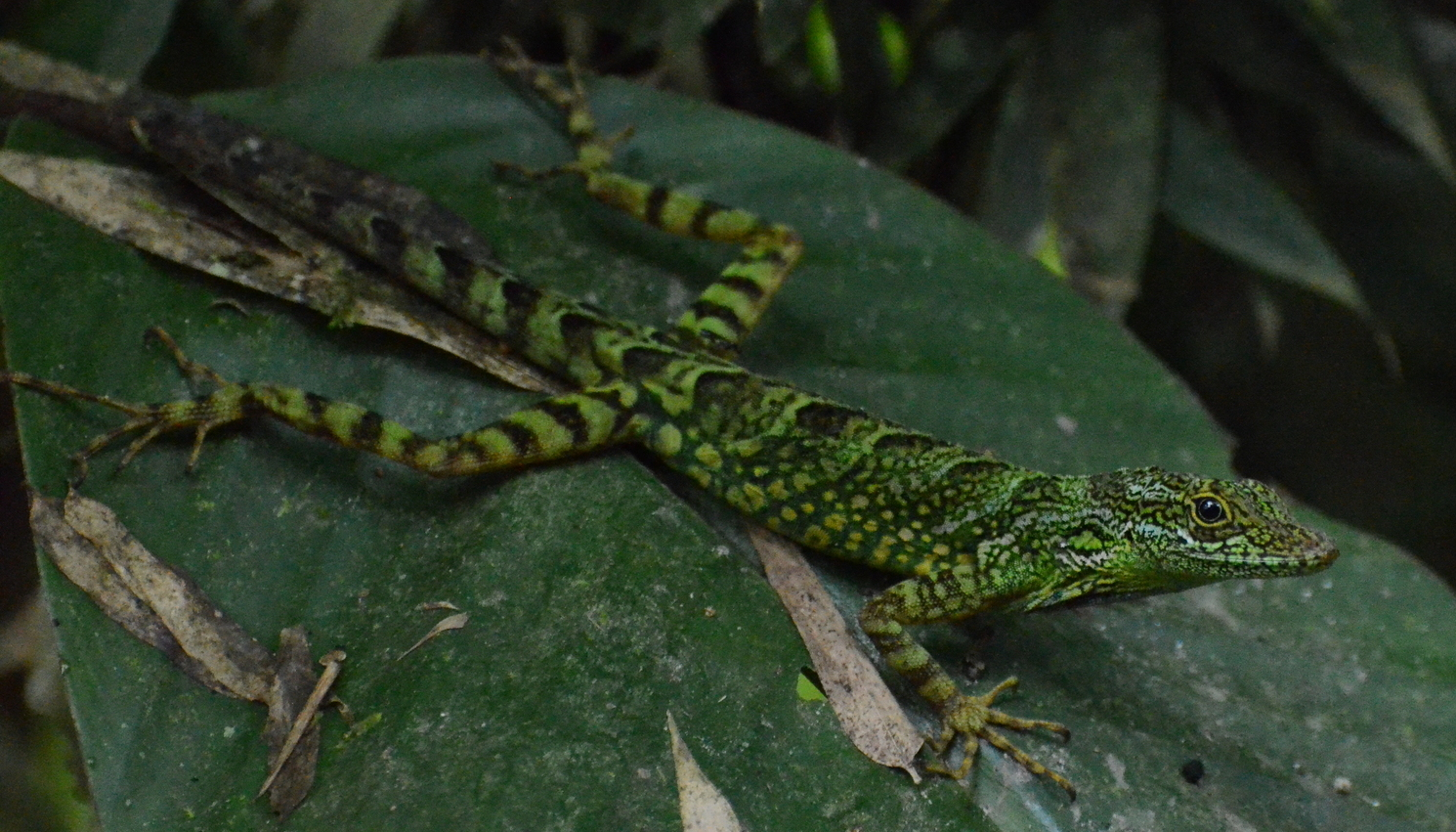
Equatorial anole (A. aequatorialis)

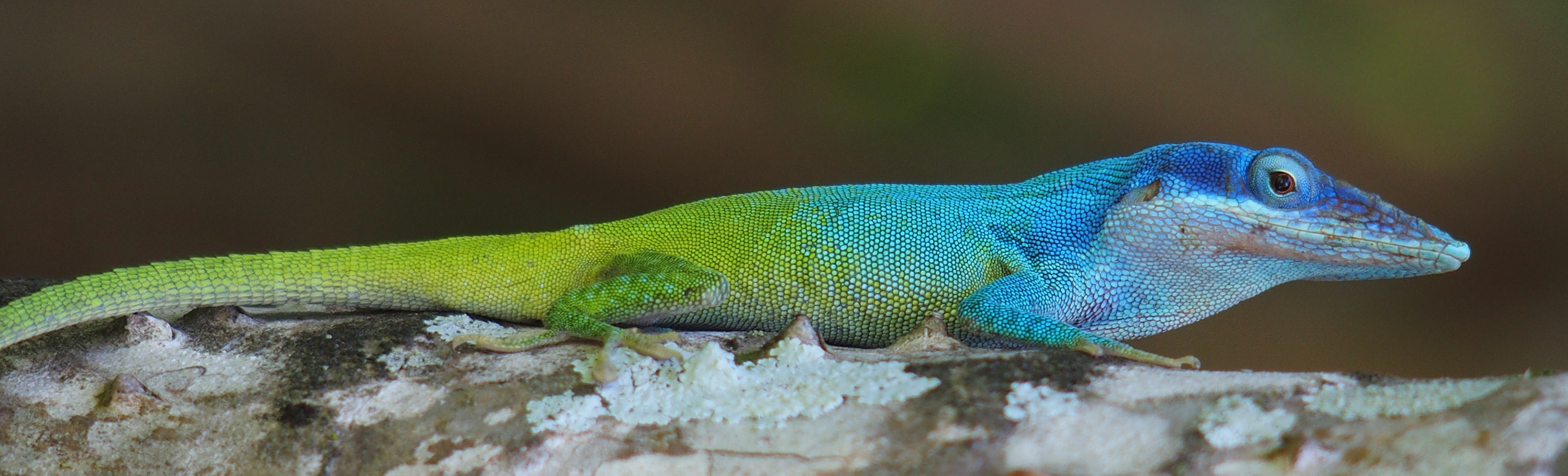
Cuban blue anole (A. allisoni)

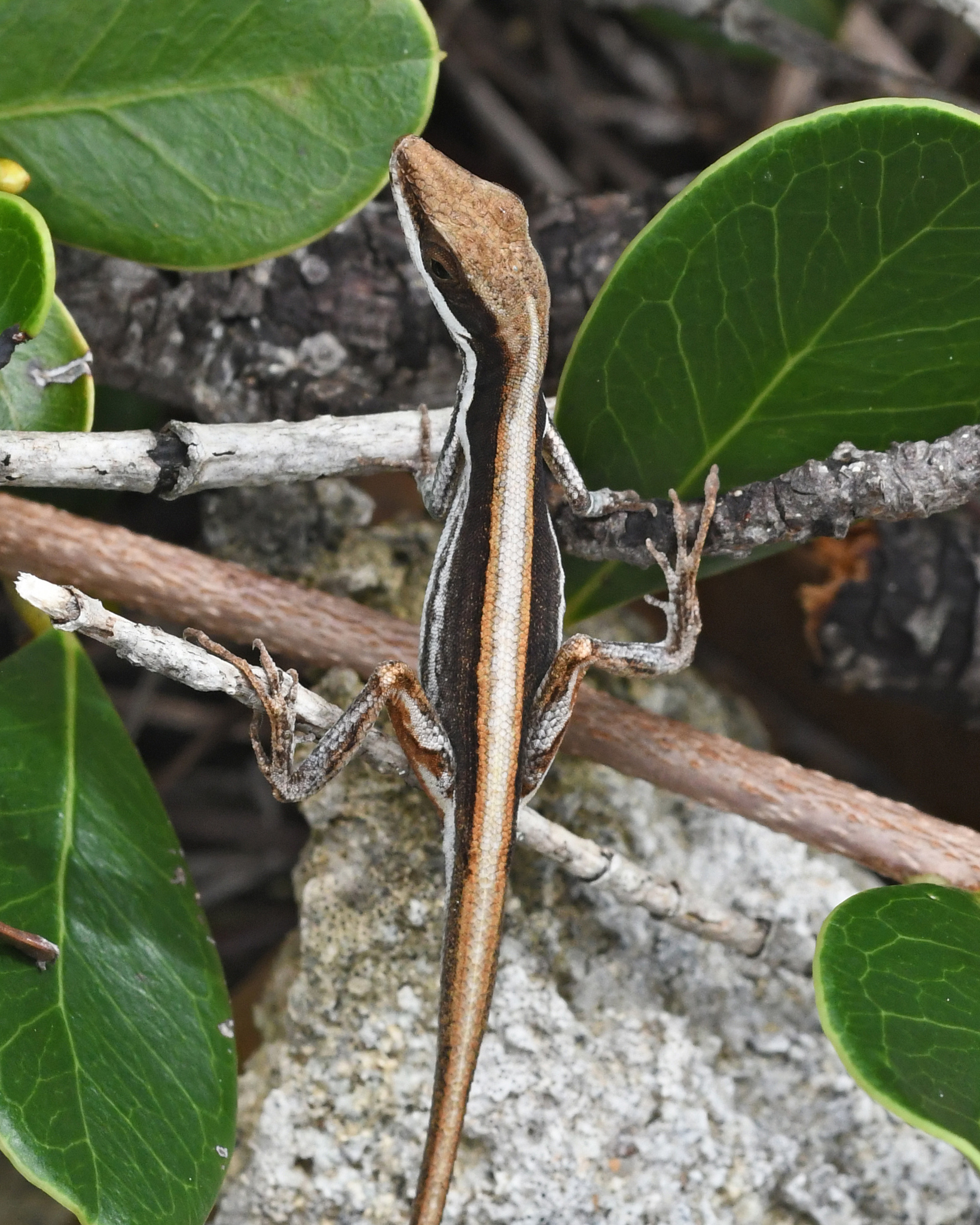
Barahona grass anole (A. alumina)

- Anolis acutus Hallowell, 1856 – St. Croix anole, sharp anole
- Anolis aeneus Gray, 1840 – Grenada bush anole, bronze anole
- Anolis aequatorialis F. Werner, 1898 – equatorial anole
- Anolis agassizi Stejneger, 1900 – Agassiz's anole
- Anolis agueroi (Díaz, Navarro & Garrido, 1998) – Cabo Cruz bearded anole, Aguero's anole
- Anolis ahli Barbour, 1925 – Escambray blue-eyed anole, Ahl's anole
- Anolis alayoni Estrada & Hedges, 1995 – Guantanamo twig anole, Alayon's anole
- Anolis alfaroi Garrido & Hedges, 1992 – Small-fanned bush anole, Alfaro's anole
- Anolis aliniger Mertens, 1939 – axillary spotted anole, northern green twig anole, La Vega anole
- Anolis allisoni Barbour, 1928 – Cuban blue anole, Allison's anole
- Anolis allogus Barbour & Ramsden, 1919 – Spanish Flag anole, Bueycito anole
- Anolis alocomyos Köhler, Vargas, & Lotzkat, 2014
- Anolis altae Dunn, 1930 – high anole
- Anolis altavelensis Noble & Hassler, 1933 – Alto Velo gracile anole, Noble's anole
- Anolis altitudinalis Garrido, 1985 – Turquino green-mottled anole
- Anolis alumina Hertz, 1976 – Barahona grass anole, shiny anole
- Anolis alutaceus Cope, 1861 – blue-eyed grass-bush anole, Monte Verde anole, blue-eyed twig anole
- Anolis alvarezdeltoroi Nieto Montes de Oca, 1996 – Alvarez del Toro's Anole
- Anolis amplisquamosus (McCranie, Wilson & K. Williams, 1993)
- Anolis anatoloros Ugueto, Rivas, Barros, Sánchez-Pacheco & García-Pérez, 2007
- Anolis anchicayae Poe, Velasco, Miyata & E. Williams, 2009
- Anolis anfiloquioi Garrido, 1980 – brown-eyed bush anole, Anfiodlul anole
- Anolis aquaticus in Costa Rica(video)
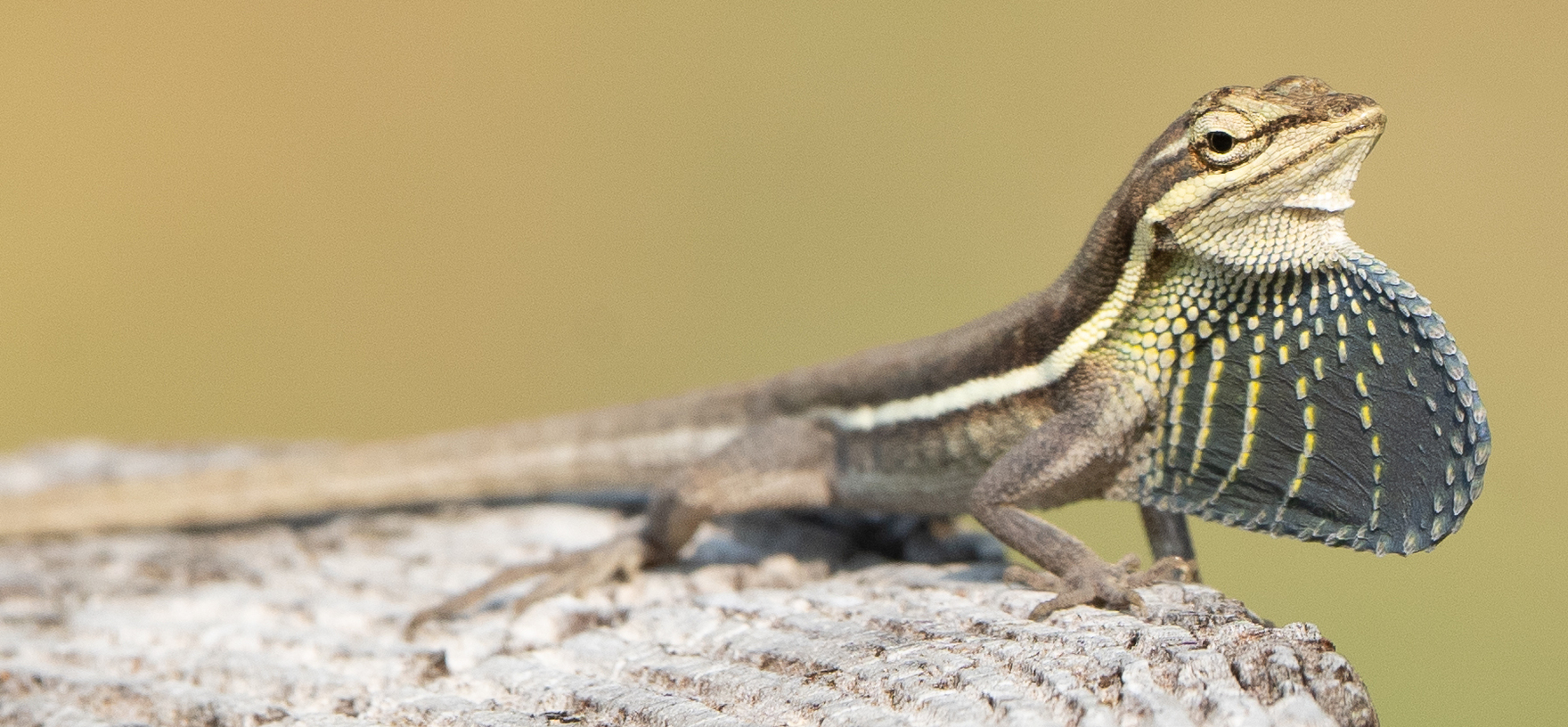
  Grass anole (A. auratus)
  Anolis angusticeps Hallowell, 1856 – Cuban twig anole
- Anolis anisolepis H.M. Smith, Burley & Fritts, 1968 – Chiapas ornate anole
- Anolis annectens E. Williams, 1974 – annex anole
- Anolis anoriensis Velasco, Gutiérrez-Cárdenas & Quintero-Angel, 2010
- Anolis antioquiae E. Williams, 1985 – Antiodlula anole
- Anolis antonii Boulenger, 1908 – San Antonio anole, Antoni's anole
- Anolis apletolepis Kohler & Hedges, 2016 – La Selle twig anole
- Anolis apletophallus G. Köhler & Sunyer, 2008
- Anolis apollinaris Boulenger, 1919 – Boulenger's anole
- Anolis aquaticus Taylor, 1956 – water anole
- Anolis arenal Köhler & Vargas, 2019
- Anolis argenteolus Cope, 1861 – Cuban trunk anole, Guantanamo anole
- Anolis argillaceus Cope, 1862 – Cuban dark bark anole, bay anole
- Anolis aridius Köhler, Zimmer, McGrath, & Hedges, 2019
- Anolis armouri (Cochran, 1934) – armoured anole, Armour's anole, black-throated stout anole
- Anolis auratus Daudin, 1802 – grass anole
- Anolis aurifer Schwartz, 1968
- Anolis australis Köhler, Zimmer, McGrath, & Hedges, 2019 – southern stout anole

== B ==
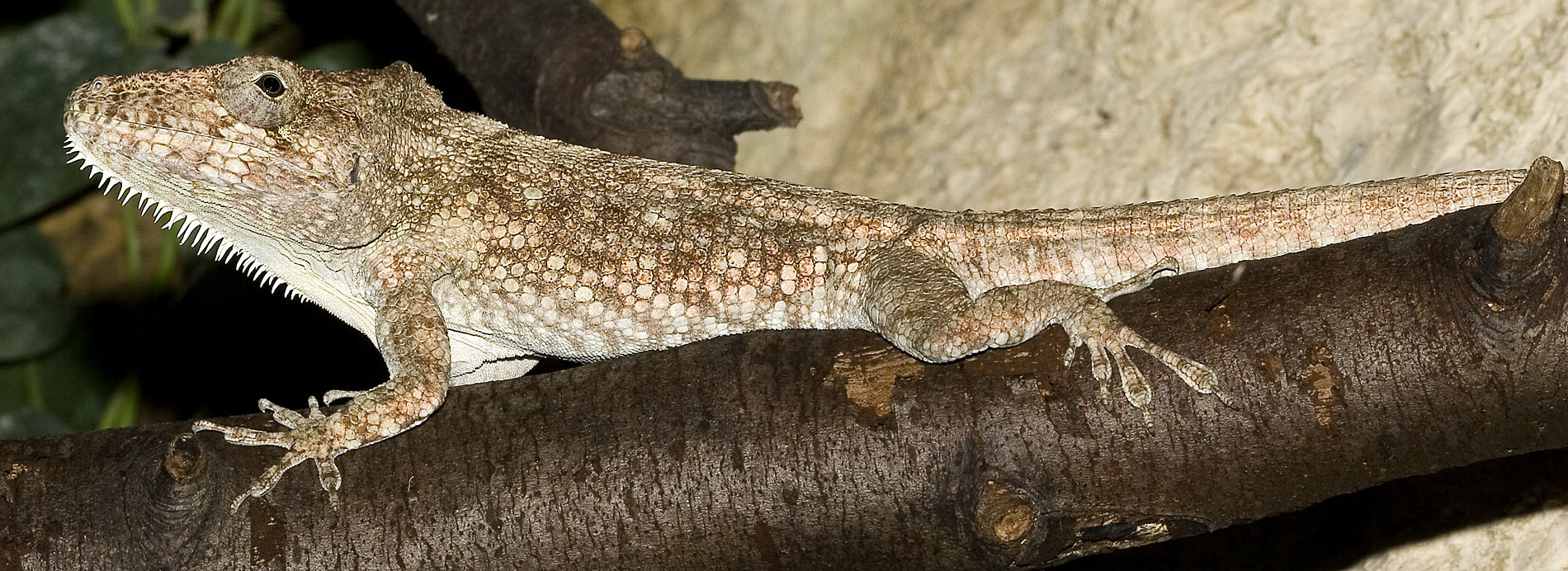
Cuban false chameleon (A. barbatus)

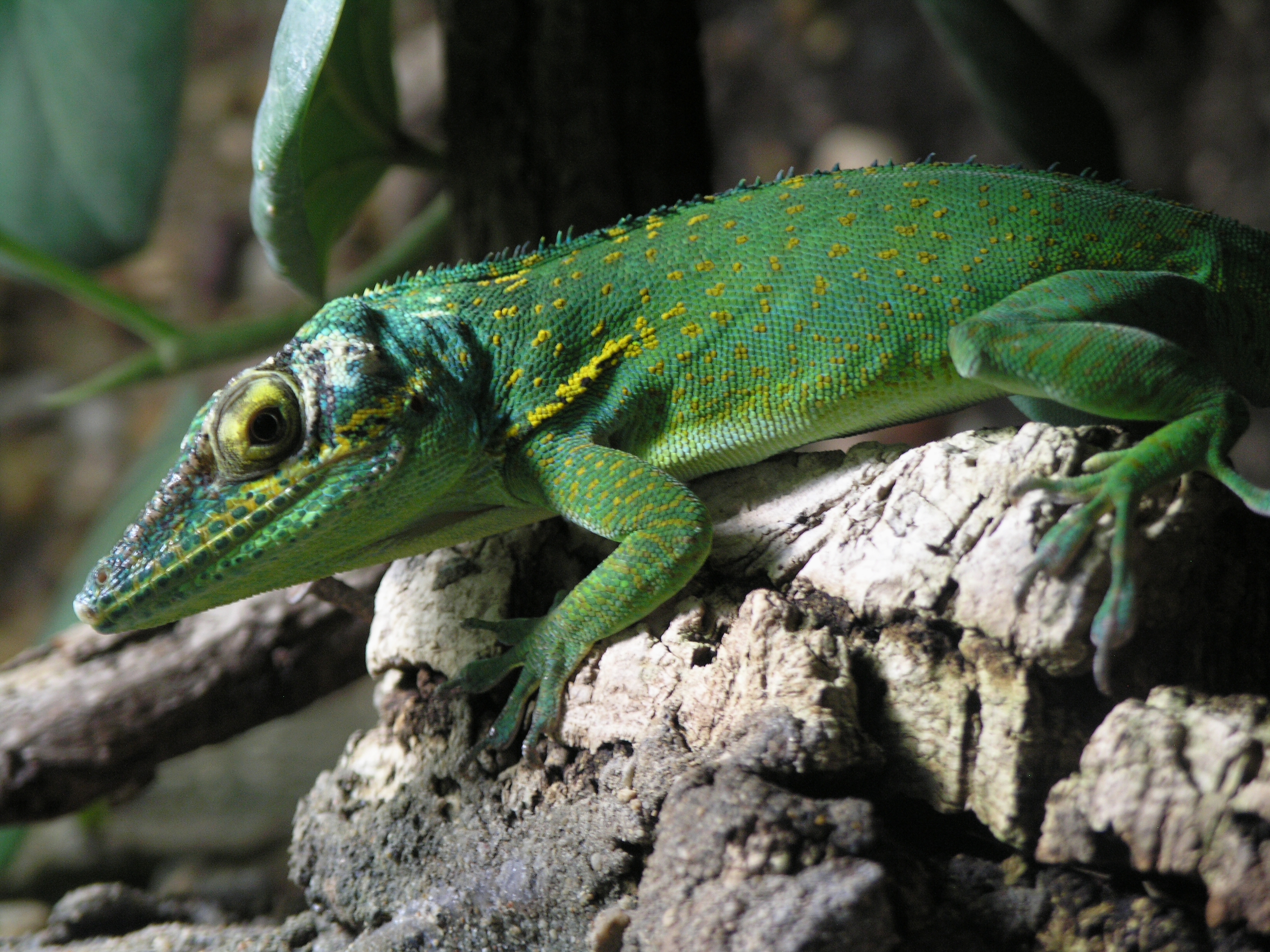
Baracoa anole (A. baracoae )

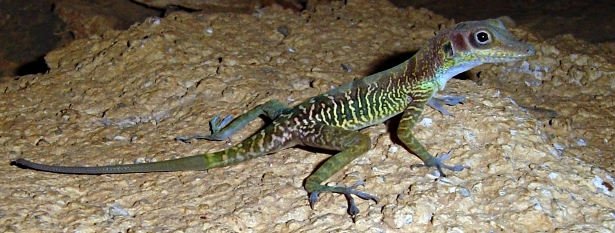
West Cuban anole (A. bartschi)

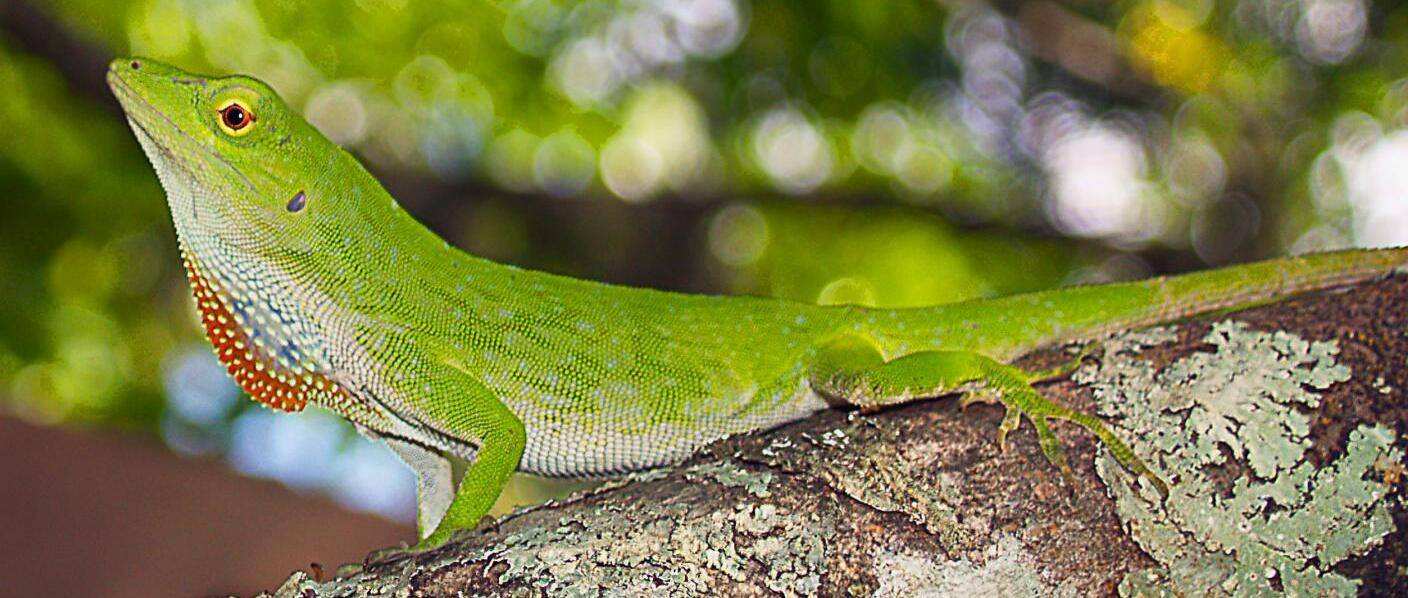
Giant green anole (A. biporcatus)

- Anolis bahorucoensis Noble & Hassler, 1933 – Baoruco long-snouted anole, Bahoruco long-snouted anole
  - Anolis bahorucoensis bahorucoensis Noble & Hassler, 1933
  - Anolis bahorucoensis southerlandi Schwartz, 1978
- Anolis baleatus (Cope, 1864) – Dominican giant anole, Puerto Plata anole
  - Anolis baleatus altager Schwartz, 1975
  - Anolis baleatus baleatus (Cope, 1864)
  - Anolis baleatus caeruleolatus Schwartz, 1974
  - Anolis baleatus fraudator Schwartz, 1974
  - Anolis baleatus lineatacervix Schwartz, 1978
  - Anolis baleatus litorisilva Schwartz, 1974
  - Anolis baleatus multistruppus Schwartz, 1974
  - Anolis baleatus samanae Schwartz, 1974
  - Anolis baleatus scelestus Schwartz, 1974
  - Anolis baleatus sublimis Schwartz, 1974
- Anolis baracoae Schwartz, 1964 – Baracoa anole
- Anolis barahonae E. Williams, 1962 – Baracoa giant anole, Barahona anole
  - Anolis barahonae albocellatus Schwartz, 1974
  - Anolis barahonae barahonae E. Williams, 1962 – Baracoa giant anole, Barahona anole
  - Anolis barahonae ininquinatus Cullom & Schwartz, 1980
  - Anolis barahonae mulitus Cullom & Schwartz, 1980
- Anolis barbatus (Garrido, 1982) – western bearded anole, West Cuban False Chameleon
- Anolis barbouri (Schmidt, 1919) – Hispaniolan hopping anole, Barbour's hopping anole
- Anolis barkeri (Schmidt, 1939) – Barker's anole
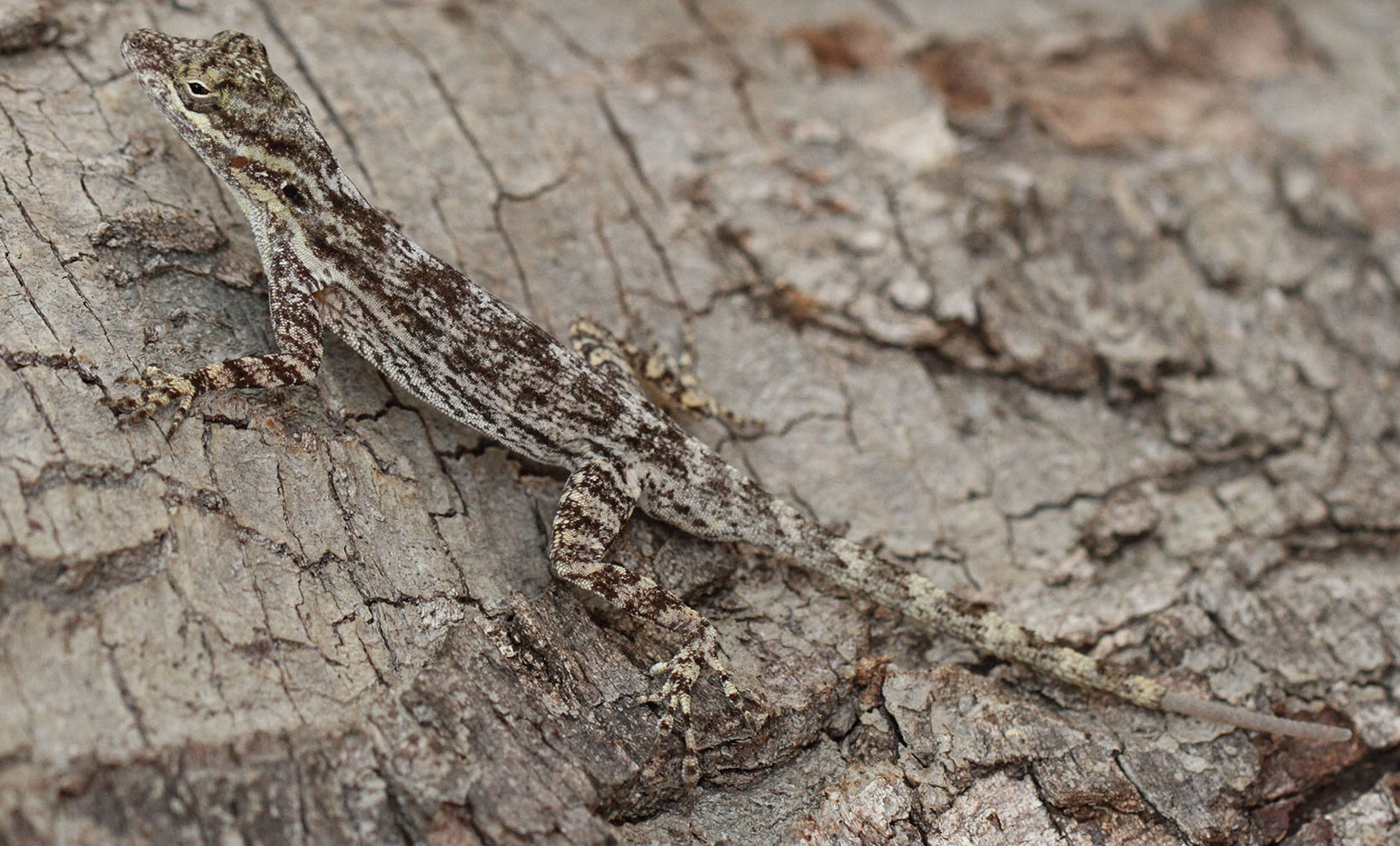
- Shortnose anole (A. brevirostris)
  Anolis bartschi (Cochran, 1934) – Pinar Del Rio cliff anole, western cliff anole, West Cuban anole
- Anolis beckeri Boulenger, 1881 – Becker's lichen anole
- Anolis bellipeniculus (Myers & Donnelly, 1996)
- Anolis benedikti Lotzkat, Bienentreu, Hertz & G. Köhler, 2011
- Anolis bicaorum (G. Köhler, 1996) – Bay Islands anole
- Anolis bimaculatus (Sparrman, 1784) – Statia Bank tree anole, panther anole
- Anolis binotatus W. Peters, 1863 – two-marked anole
- Anolis biporcatus (Wiegmann, 1834) – giant green anole, neotropical green anole
- Anolis birama Garrido, 1980 – Cuban big-eared anole, branch anole
- Anolis bitectus Cope, 1864 – roof anole
- Anolis blanquillanus Hummelinck, 1940 – La Blanquilla anole, Hummelinck's anole
- Anolis boettgeri Boulenger, 1911 – Boettger's anole
- Anolis bombiceps Cope, 1876 – surprise anole, blue-lipped forest anole
- Anolis bonairensis Ruthven, 1923 – Bonaire anole, Ruthven's anole
- Anolis boulengerianus Thominot, 1887 – Tehuantepec anole
- Anolis brasiliensis Vanzolini & Williams, 1970 – Brazilian anole
- Anolis bremeri Barbour, 1914 – Cuban variegated anole, Herradura anole, Bremer's anole
  - Anolis bremeri bremeri Barbour, 1914 – Cuban variegated anole, Herradura anole, Bremer's anole
  - Anolis bremeri insulaepinorum Garrido, 1972
- Anolis breslini Schwartz, 1980 - Northwest Haitian stout anole, Breslin's stout anole
- Anolis brevirostris Bocourt, 1870 – desert gracile anole, shortnose anole
  - Anolis brevirostris brevirostris Bocourt, 1870
  - Anolis brevirostris deserticola D. Arnold, 1980
  - Anolis brevirostris wetmorei Cochran, 1931 – Wetmore's shortnose anole
- Anolis brianjuliani Köhler, Petersen, & Méndez de la Cruz, 2019
- Anolis brooksi Barbour, 1923
- Anolis brunneus Cope, 1894 – Crooked-Acklins green anole, Crooked Island anole

== C ==
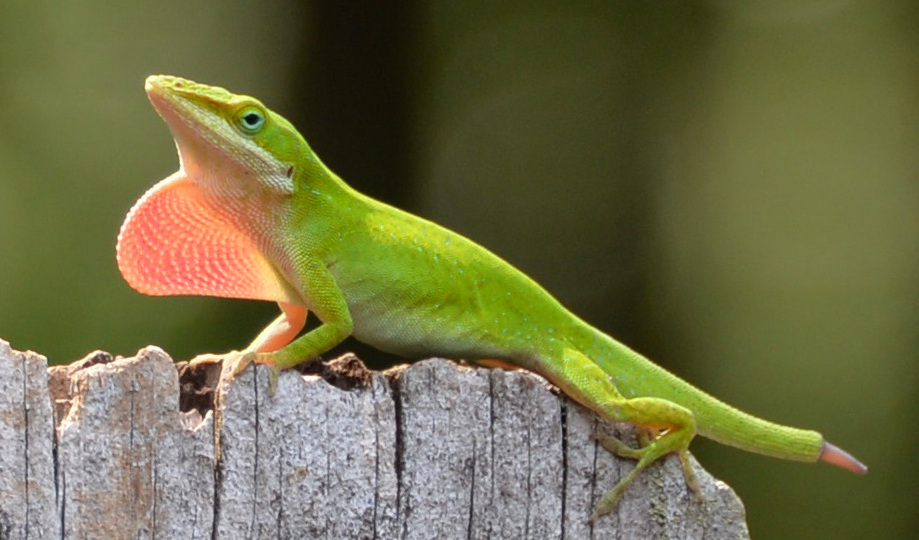
Carolina green anole (A. carolinensis) regenerating tail

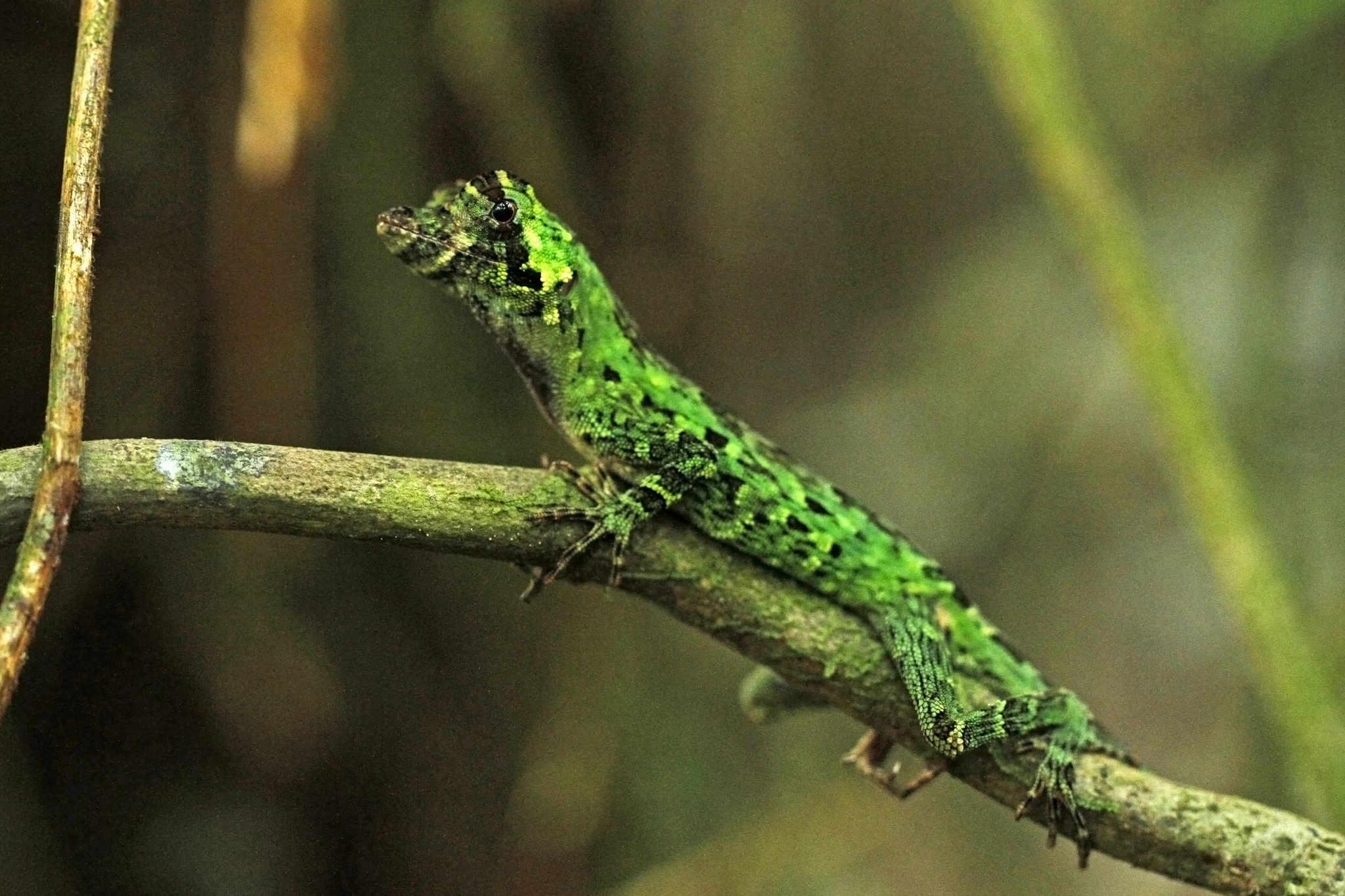
Bighead anole (A. capito)

- Anolis caceresae Hofmann & Townsend, 2018 – Berta's anole
- Anolis calimae Ayala, Harris & E. Williams, 1993 – Ayala's anole
- Anolis callainus Köhler & Hedges, 2020 – Dominican green anole, Northern Hispaniolan green anole, Hispaniolan green anole
- Anolis campbelli (G. Köhler & E.N. Smith), 2008
- Anolis capito W. Peters, 1863 – bighead anole
- Anolis caquetae E. Williams, 1974 – Caqueta anole
- Anolis carlliebi G. Köhler et al., 2014 – Carl Lieb's anole
- Anolis carlostoddi (E. Williams, Praderio & Gorzula, 1996) – Carlos Todd's anole
- Anolis carolinensis Voigt, 1832 – green anole, North American green anole, Carolina anole
- Anolis carpenteri A.A. Echelle, A.F. Echelle & Fitch, 1971 – Carpenter's anole
- Anolis casildae Arosemena, Ibáñez & De Sousa, 1991 – Casilda's anole
- Anolis caudalis Cochran, 1932 – Gonave gracile anole, Cochran's gianthead anole
- Anolis centralis J. Peters, 1970 – central pallid anole, central anole
  - Anolis centralis centralis J. Peters, 1970
  - Anolis centralis litoralis Garrido, 1975
- Anolis chamaeleonides A.M.C. Duméril & Bibron, 1837 – short-bearded anole
- Anolis charlesmyersi Köhler, 2010
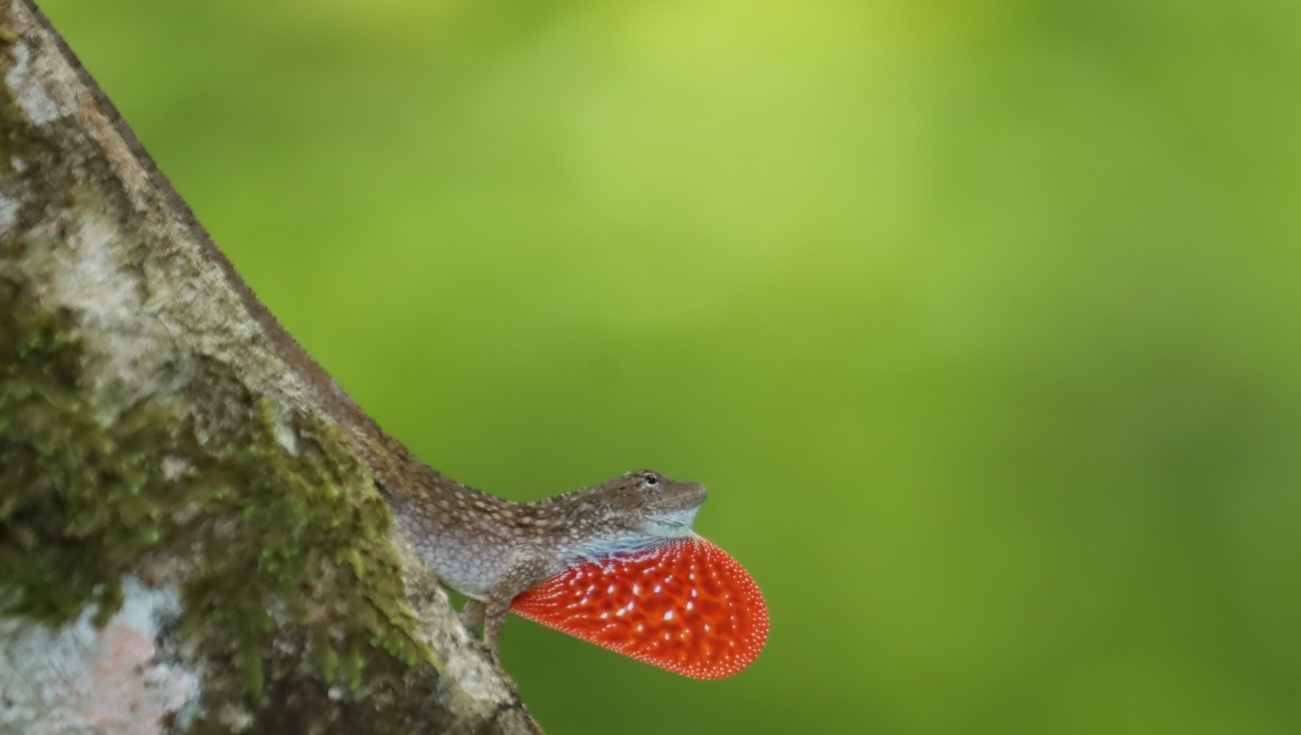
- Charles Myers anole (A. charlesmyersi)
  Anolis chloris Boulenger, 1898 – Boulenger's green anole
- Anolis chlorocyanus A.M.C. Duméril & Bibron, 1837 – Tiburon green anole, Hispaniolan green anole, Jeremie anole
- Anolis chlorodius Kohler & Hedges, 2016 – Pedernales green anole
- Anolis christophei E. Williams, 1960 – big-fanned trunk anole, King Christophe anole
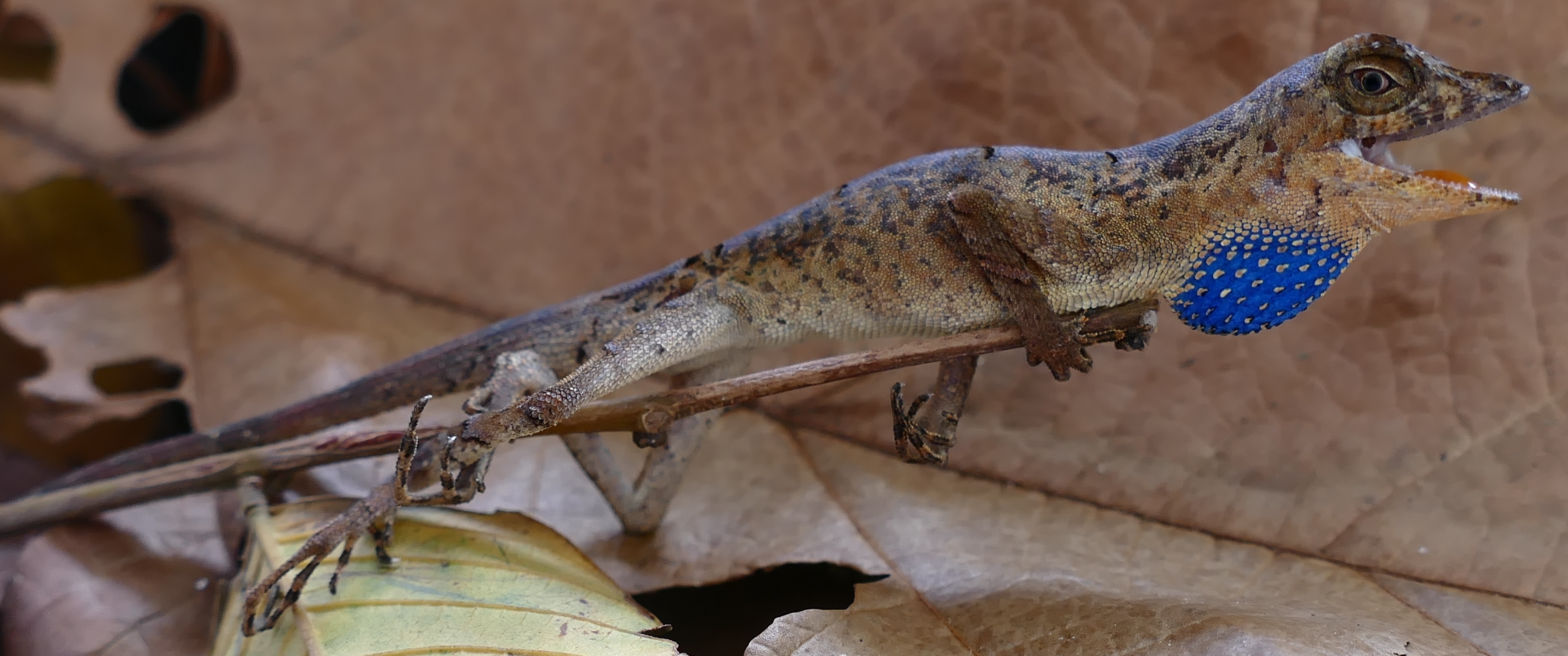
- Goldenscale anole (A. chrysolepis) male
  Anolis chrysolepis A.M.C. Duméril & Bibron, 1837 – goldenscale anole
- Anolis chrysops Lazell, 1964
- Anolis clivicola Barbour & Shreve, 1935 – Turquino fern anole, mountain anole
- Anolis cobanensis L. Stuart, 1942 – Stuart's anole
- Anolis compressicauda Smith & Kerster, 1955 – Malposo scaly anole
- Anolis concolor Cope, 1863 – Isla San Andres anole
- Anolis confusus Estrada & Garrido, 1991 – Cabo Cruz trunk anole
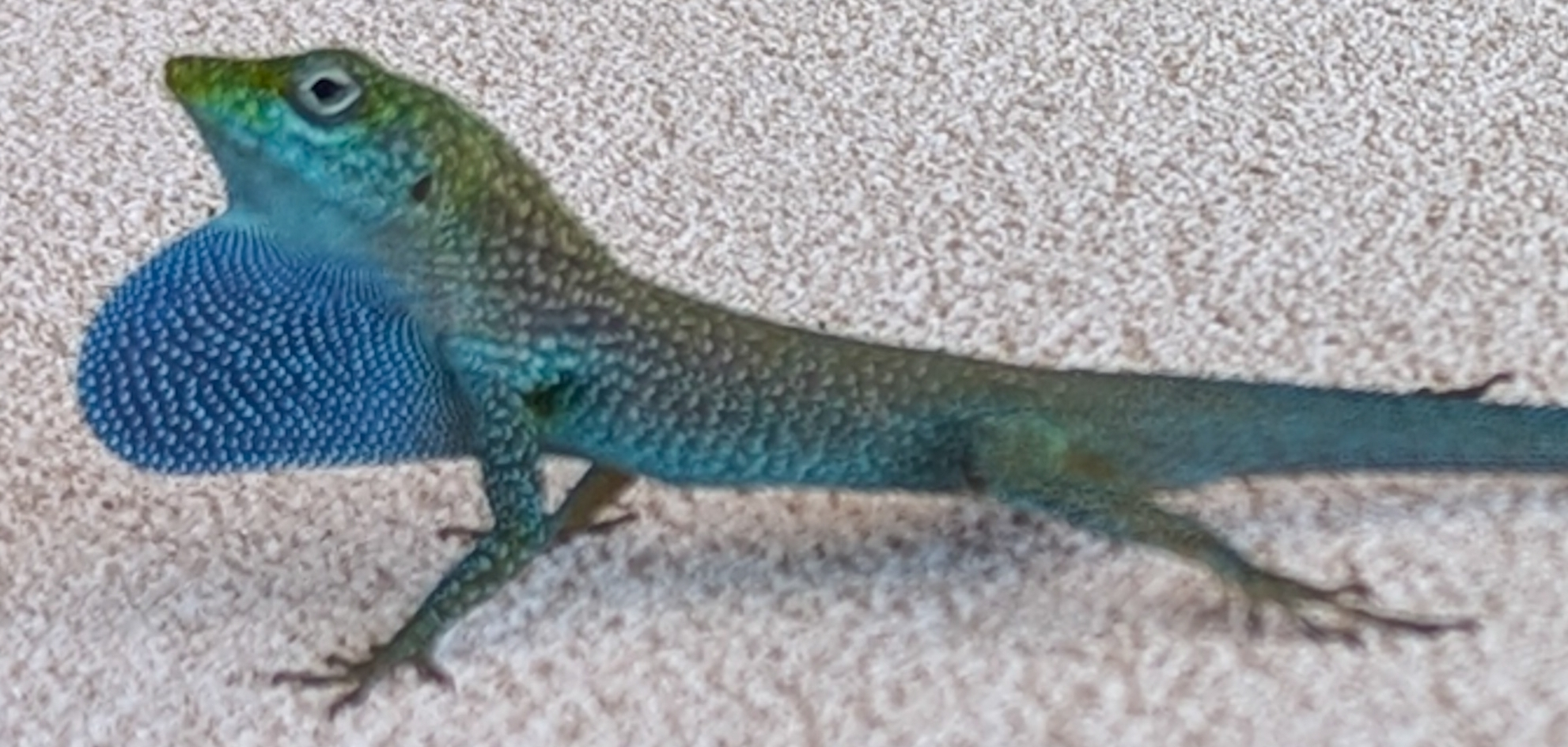
- Blue throated anole (A. conspersus)
  Anolis conspersus Garman, 1887 – Cayman Islands blue-fanned anole, Grand Cayman blue-fanned anole, Grand Cayman anole
  - Anolis conspersus conspersus Garman, 1887
  - Anolis conspersus lewisi Grant, 1940
- Anolis cooki Grant, 1931 – Guanica pallid anole, Cook's pallid anole, Cook's anole
- Anolis crassulus Cope, 1864 – ornate anole
- Anolis cristatellus A.M.C. Duméril & Bibron, 1837 – crested anole
  - Anolis cristatellus cristatellus A.M.C. Duméril & Bibron, 1837 – Puerto Rican crested anole
  - Anolis cristatellus wileyae Grant, 1931
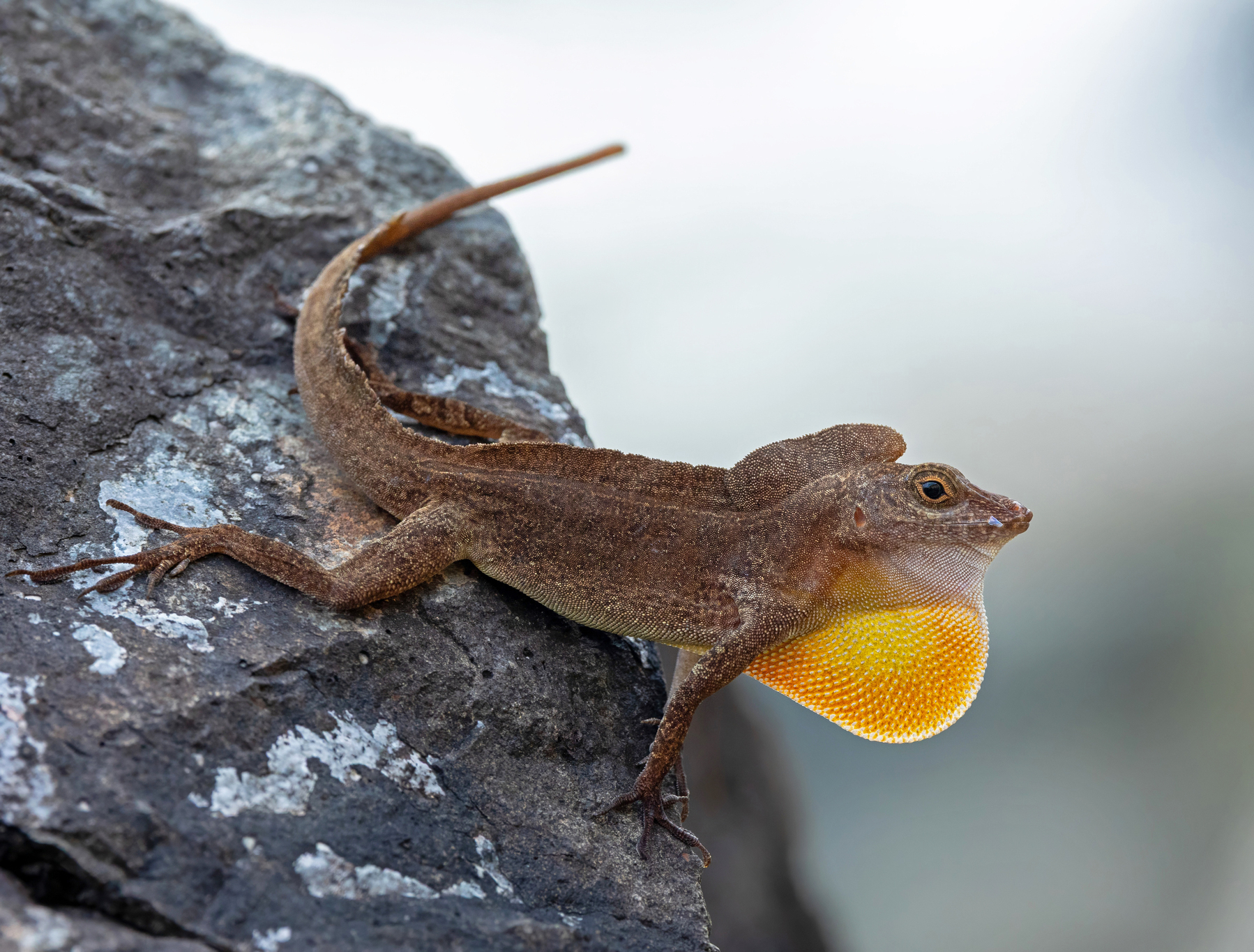
    Crested anole (A. cristatellus)
- Anolis cristifer H.M. Smith, 1968 – crested lichen anole, Cristifer anole
- Anolis cryptolimifrons G. Köhler & Sunyer, 2008
- Anolis cupeyalensis J. Peters, 1970 – stripe-bellied grass anole, Cupeyal anole
- Anolis cupreus Hallowell, 1860 – copper anole
  - Anolis cupreus cupreus Hallowell, 1860
  - Anolis cupreus dariense Fitch & Seigel, 1984
  - Anolis cupreus hoffmani W. Peters, 1863
  - Anolis cupreus spilomelas Fitch, A.A. Echelle & A.F. Echelle, 1972
- Anolis cuprinus H.M. Smith, 1964 – copper anole, Chiapas anole
- Anolis cuscoensis (Poe, Yañez-Miranda & Lehr, 2008)
- Anolis cusuco (McCranie, G. Köhler & Wilson, 2000)
- Anolis cuvieri (Merrem, 1820) – Cuvier's anole, green giant anole or Puerto Rican giant anole
- Anolis cyanopleurus Cope, 1861 – green fern anole, Yateras anole
  - Anolis cyanopleurus cyanopleurus Cope, 1861
  - Anolis cyanopleurus orientalis Garrido, 1975
- Anolis cyanostictus Mertens, 1939 – Santo Domingo green anole
- Anolis cybotes (Cope, 1862) – Hispaniolan stout anole, large-headed anole
  - Anolis cybotes cybotes Cope, 1862
  - Anolis cybotes doris Barbour, 1925
  - Anolis cybotes ravifaux Schwartz & Henderson, 1982
- Anolis cymbops (Cope, 1864) – Cope's Veracruz anole

== D ==
- Anolis damulus Cope, 1864 – Cope's smooth anole
- Anolis danieli E. Williams, 1988 – Daniel's anole
- Anolis darlingtoni (Cochran, 1935) – La Hotte twig anole, Darlington's anole
- Anolis datzorum (Köhler, Ponce, Sunyer, & Batista, 2007)
- Anolis delafuentei Garrido, 1982 –Escambray crested anole, Guamuhaya anole
- Anolis deltae E. Williams, 1974 – delta anole
- Anolis demissus Schwartz, 1969 – Île Grande Cayemite green anole
- Anolis desechensis (Heatwole, 1976) – Desecheo anole, Heatwole's anole
- Anolis desiradei Lazell, 1964 – La Desirade anole
- Anolis dissimilis E. Williams, 1965 – odd anole
- Anolis distichus (Cope, 1861) – bark anole
  - Anolis distichus biminiensis Oliver, 1948
  - Anolis distichus dapsilis Schwartz, 1968
  - Anolis distichus distichoides Rosén, 1911
  - Anolis distichus distichus Cope, 1861 – common bark anole
  - Anolis distichus floridanus H.M. Smith and McCauley, 1948 – Florida bark anole
  - Anolis distichus juliae Cochran, 1934
  - Anolis distichus ocior Schwartz, 1968
  - Anolis distichus patruelis Schwartz, 1968
  - Anolis distichus sejunctus Shwartz, 1968
  - Anolis distichus suppar Schwartz, 1968
  - Anolis distichus tostus Schwartz, 1968
- Anolis divius Kohler & Hedges, 2016 – Baoruco blue anole
- Anolis dolichocephalus E. Williams, 1963 – La Hotte long-snouted anole, Place Negre anole
  - Anolis dolichocephalus dolichocephalus E. Williams, 1963,
  - Anolis dolichocephalus portusalus Schwartz, 1978
  - Anolis dolichocephalus sarmenticola Schwartz, 1978
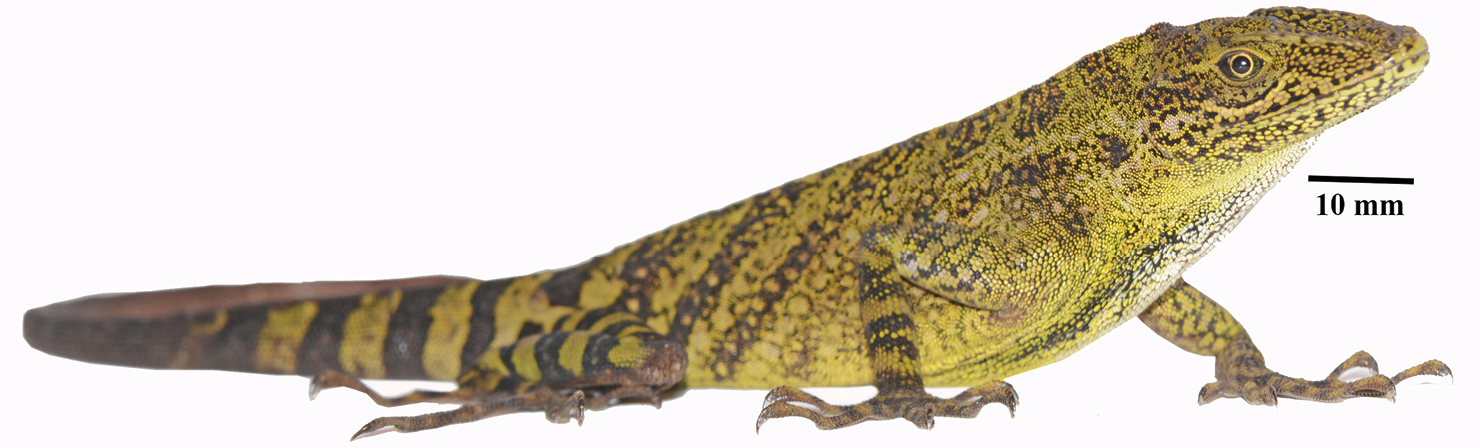
    Dracula anole (A. dracula)
- Anolis dollfusianus (Bocourt, 1873) – coffee anole
- Anolis dominicensis Reinhardt and Lütken, 1863 – Dominican Republic bark anole
- Anolis doris Barbour, 1925 – Gonave stout anole
- Anolis dracula (Yánez-Muñoz et al., 2018) – Dracula anole
- Anolis duellmani Fitch & Henderson, 1973 – Duellman's pigmy anole
- Anolis dunni Smith, 1936 – Dunn's anole

== E ==
- Anolis eladioi Kohler & Hedges, 2016 – Baoruco green anole
- Anolis elcopeensis Poe, Scarpetta, & Schaad, 2015

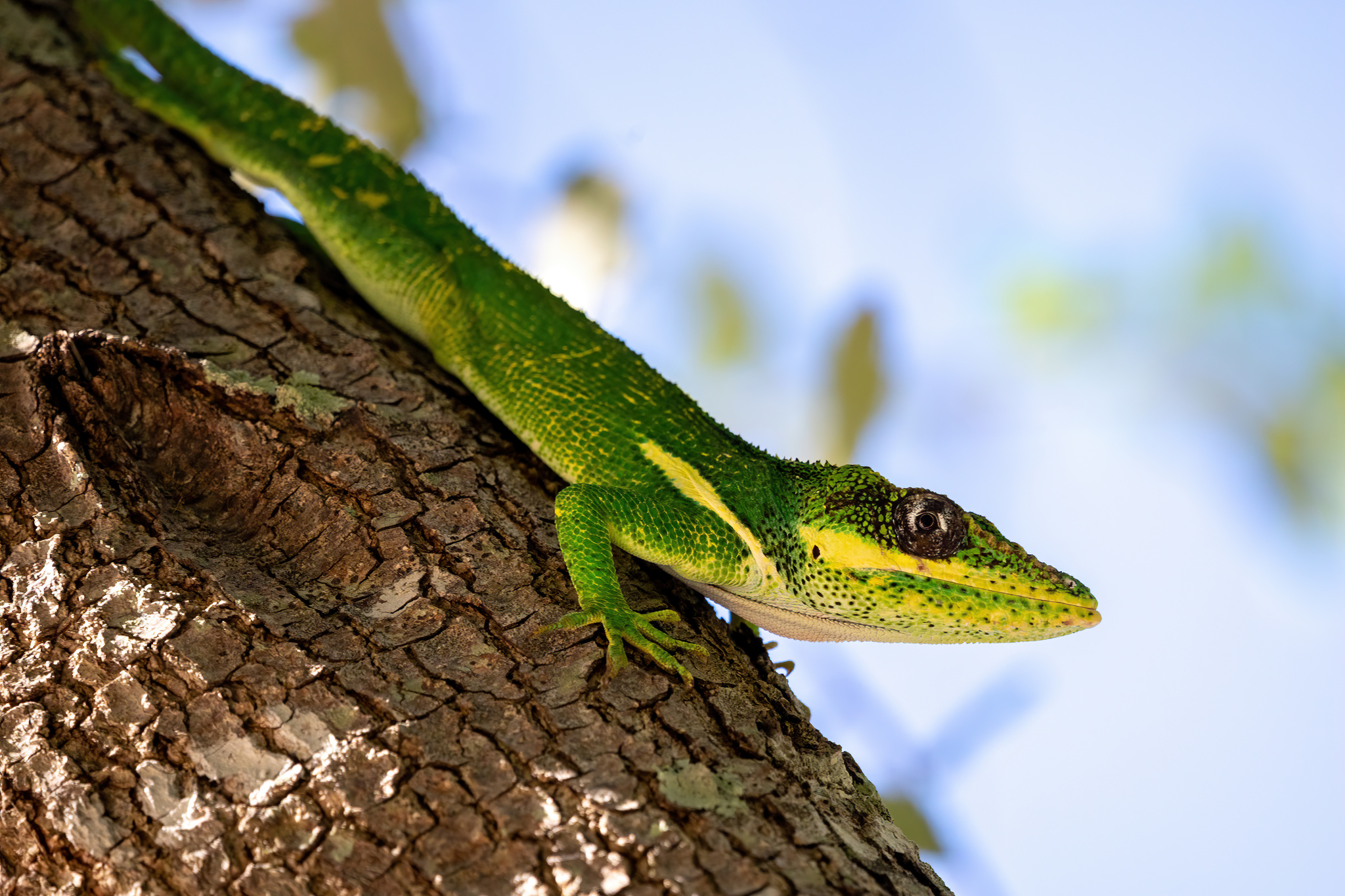
Knight anole (A. equestris)

- Anolis equestris (Merrem, 1820) – Cuban giant anole, knight anole
  - Anolis equestris brujensis Garrido, 2001
  - Anolis equestris buidei Schwartz and Garrido, 1972 – Buide's knight anole
  - Anolis equestris cincoleguas Garrido, 1981
  - Anolis equestris cyaneus Garrido and Estrada, 2001 – Cyan knight anole
  - Anolis equestris equestris Merrem, 1820 – Cuban knight anole
  - Anolis equestris juraguensis Schwartz and Garrido, 1972
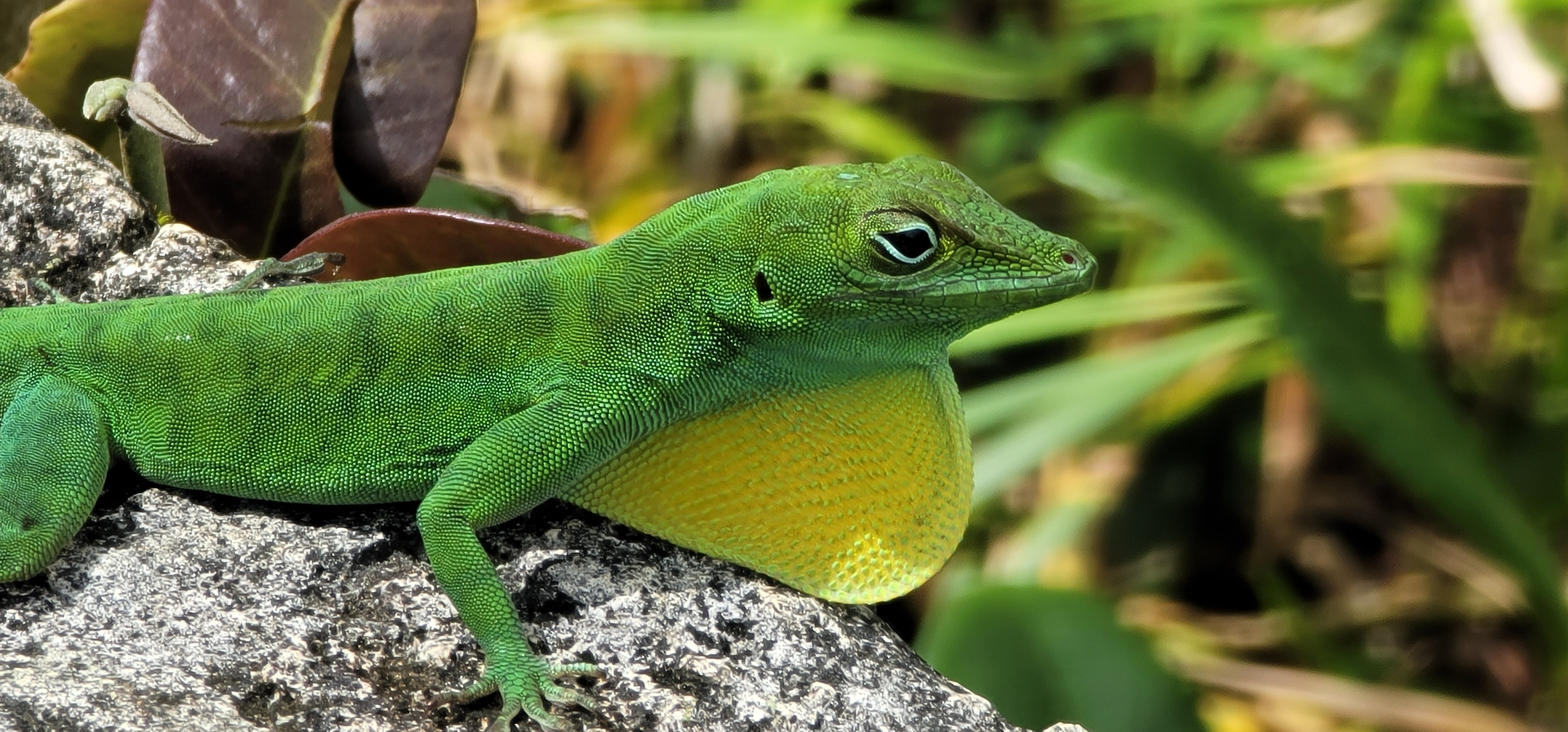
  - Emerald anole (A. evermanni)
    Anolis equestris persparsus Schwartz and Garrido, 1972,
  - Anolis equestris potior Schwartz and Thomas, 1975
  - Anolis equestris sabinalensis Garrido and Moreno, 2001
  - Anolis equestris thomasi Schwartz, 1959
  - Anolis equestris verreonensis Schwartz and Garrido, 1972
- Anolis ernestwilliamsi (Lazell, 1983) – Carrot Rock anole, Carrot Rock's anole, Ernest-Williams's anole
- Anolis etheridgei E. Williams, 1962 – montane bush anole, Etheridge's anole
- Anolis eugenegrahami (Schwartz, 1978) – Eugene-Graham's anole, black stream anole
- Anolis eulaemus (Boulenger, 1908) – good anole
- Anulis euskalerriari (Barros, E. Williams, and Viloria, 1996)
- Anolis evermanni (Stejneger, 1904) – emerald anole, Evermann's anole, or small green anole
- Anolis extremus (Garman, 1887) – Barbados anole

== F ==
- Fitch's anole (A. fitchi)
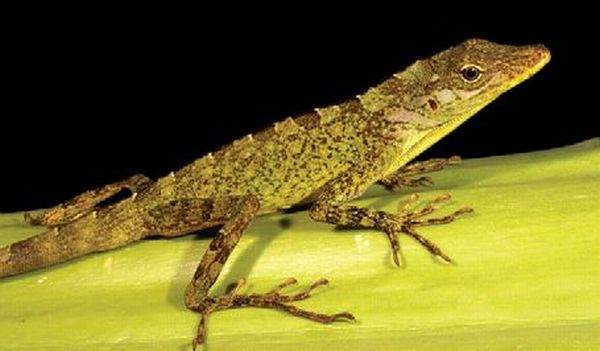
  Male
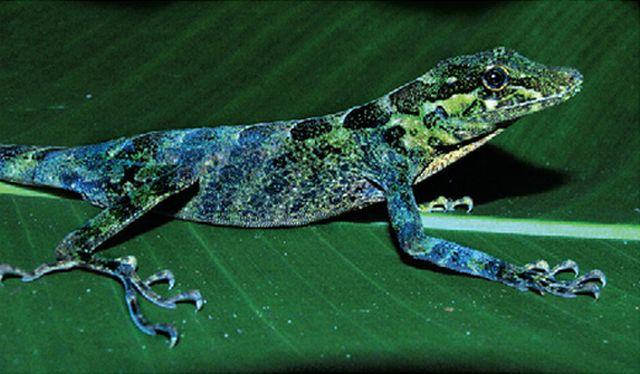
  Female
  Anolis fairchildi Barbour & Shreve, 1935 – Cay Sal anole, Fairchild's anole
- Anolis fasciatus (Boulenger, 1885) – banded anole
- Anolis favillarum Schwartz, 1968
- Anolis ferreus (Cope, 1864) – Morne Constant anole
- Anolis festae (Peracca, 1904) – Veronica's anole
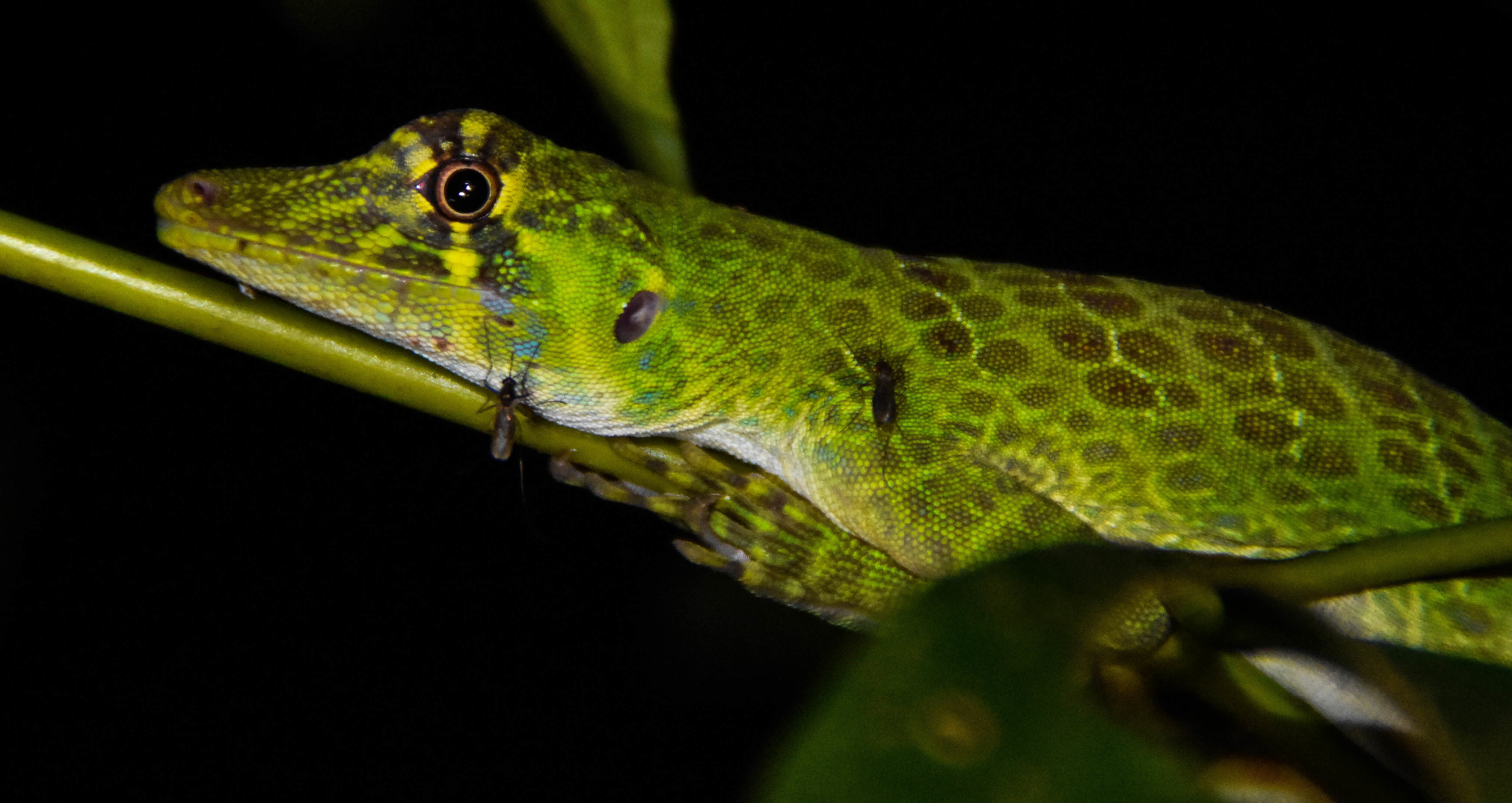
  Bridled anole (A. frenatus)
- Anolis fitchi (Williams & Duellman, 1984) – Fitch's anole
- Anolis forresti Barbour, 1923
- Anolis fortunensis (Arosemena & Ibanez, 1993)
- Anolis fowleri (Schwartz, 1973) – green-banded anole, Fowler's anole
- Anolis fraseri (Günther, 1859) – Fraser's anole
- Anolis frenatus (Cope, 1899) – bridled anole
- Anolis fugitivus Garrido, 1975 – green-headed grass anole, Moa anole
- Anolis fungosus Myers, 1971 – Myers's anole
- Anolis fuscoauratus (D'Orbigny, 1837) – brown-eared anole, slender anole

== G ==
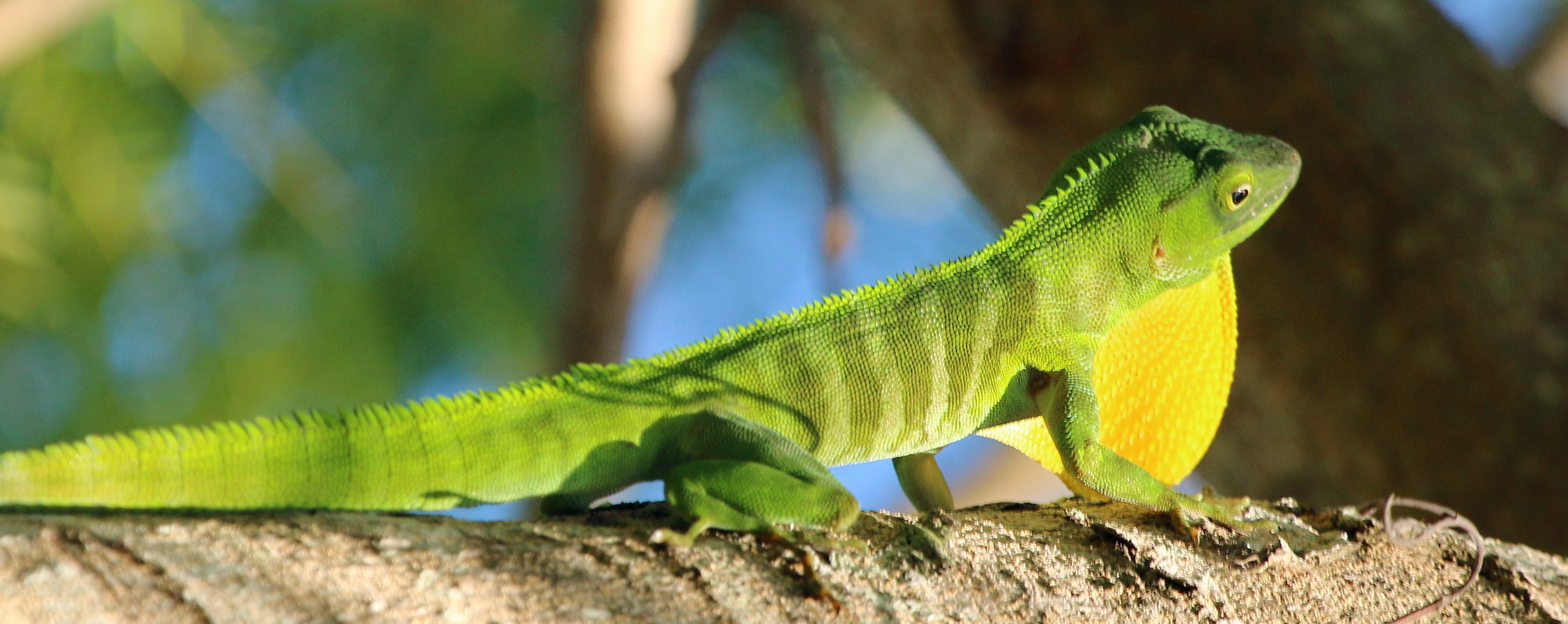
Jamaican giant anole (A. garmani)

- Anolis gadovii (Boulenger, 1905) – Gadow's anole
- Anolis gaigei Ruthven, 1916 – Gaige's anole
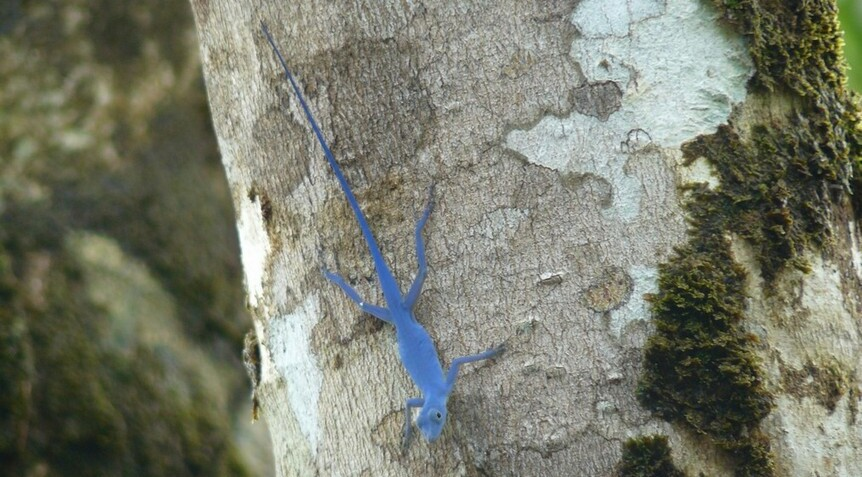
- Blue anole (A. gorgonae)
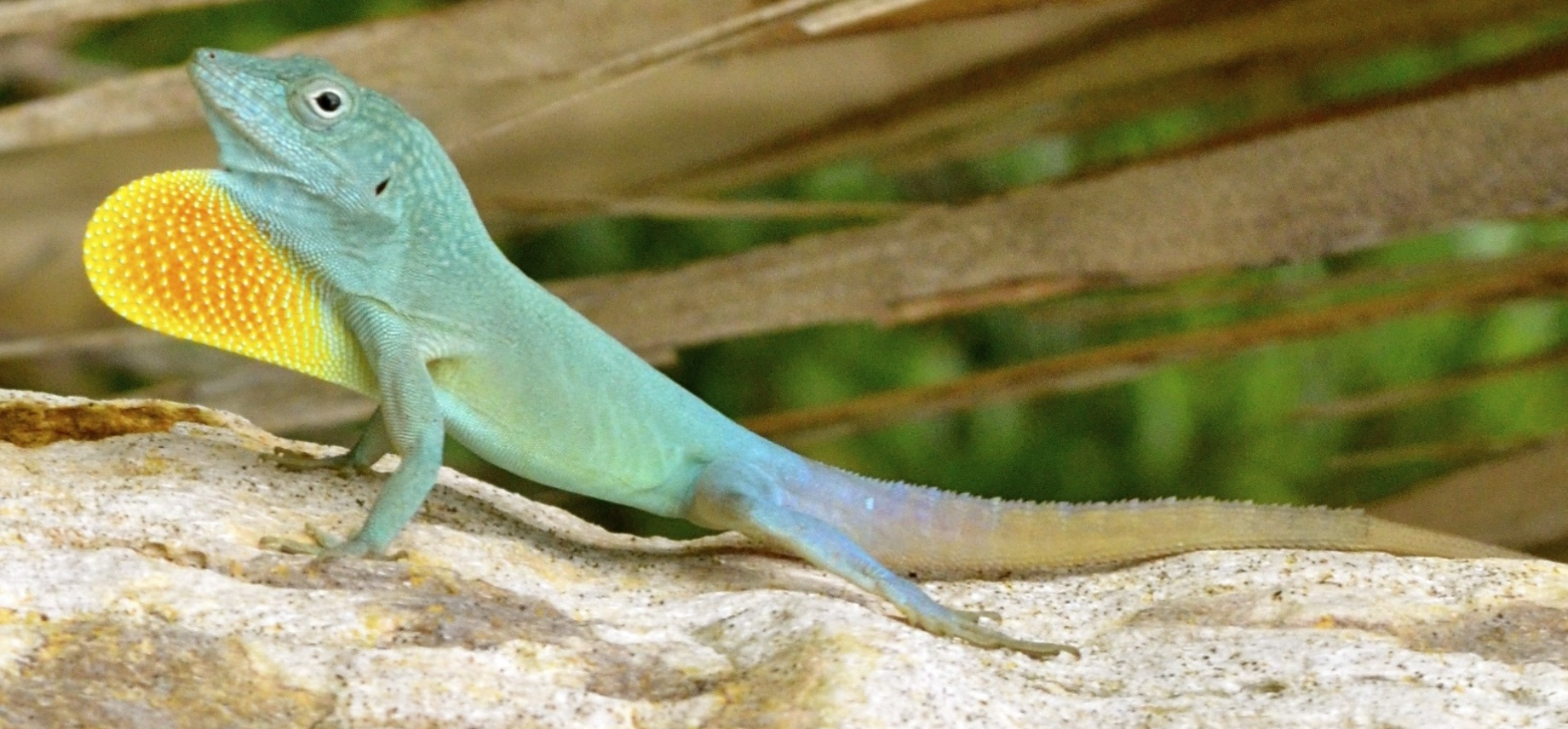
  Turquoise anole (A. grahami)
  Anolis garmani (Stejneger, 1899) – Jamaican giant anole, Jamaican anole, Jamaica giant anole
- Anolis garridoi Diaz, Estrada & Moreno, 1996 – Escambray twig anole, Garrido's anole
- Anolis gemmosus (O'Shaughnessy, 1875)) – Andes anole, O'Shaughnessy's anole
- Anolis gibbiceps (Cope, 1864) – hook anole
- Anolis ginaelisae (Lotzkat, Bienentreu, Hertz & G. Köhler, 2013)
- Anolis gingivinus (Cope, 1864) – Anguilla bank tree anole, Anguilla bank anole, Anguilla anole
- Anolis gonavensis Kohler & Hedges, 2016 – Gonave twig anole
- Anolis gorgonae (Barbour, 1905) – blue anole
- Anolis gracilipes (Boulenger, 1898) – charm anole
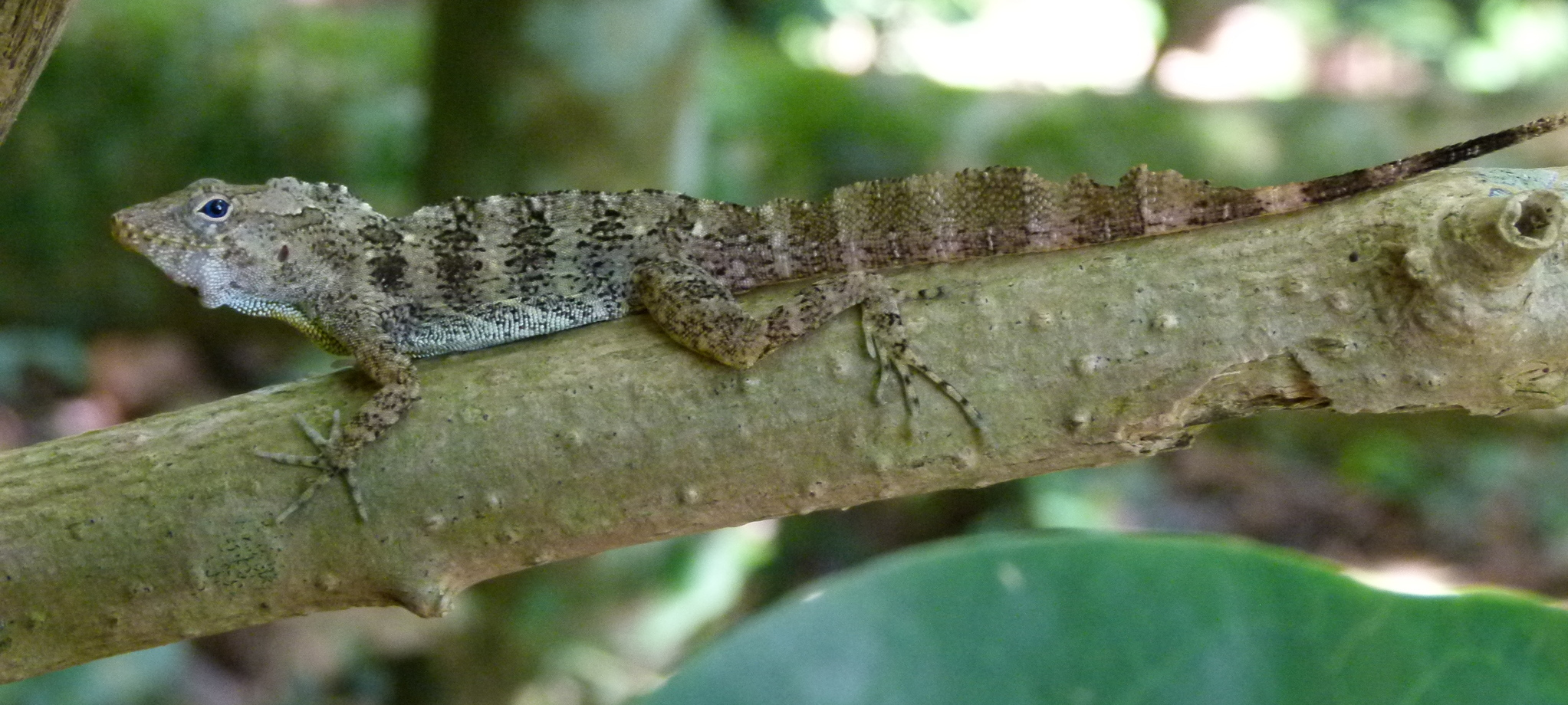
- Gundlach’s anole (A. gundlachi)
  Anolis grahami (Gray, 1845) – Jamaican turquoise anole, Graham's anole
  - Anolis grahami aquarum Underwood & Williams, 1959
  - Anolis grahami grahami Gray, 1845
- Anolis granuliceps (Boulenger, 1898) – granular anole
- Anolis griseus (Garman, 1887) – St. Vincent's tree anole
- Anolis gruuo (Köhler, Ponce, Sunyer & Batista, 2007)
- Anolis guafe (Estrada & Garrido, 1991) – Cabo Cruz banded anole
- Anolis guamuhaya (Garrido, Pérez-Beato, & Moreno, 1991) – Escambray bearded anole
- Anolis guazuma Garrido, 1984 – Turquino twig anole, Sierra anole
- Anolis gundlachi (Peters, 1877) – yellow-chinned anole, Gundlach's anole, yellow-bearded anole

== H ==
- Anolis haguei (L. Stuart, 1942) – Hague's Anole
- Anolis hendersoni (Cochran, 1923) – La Selle long-snouted anole, Henderson's anole
  - Anolis hendersoni hendersoni Cochran, 1923
  - Anolis hendersoni ravidormitans Schwartz, 1978
- Anolis heterodermus (A.H.A. Duméril, 1851) – flat Andes anole
- Anolis heteropholidotus Mertens, 1952
- Anolis higuey Köhler, Zimmer, McGrath, & Hedges, 2019 – Cordillera Oriental stout anole
- Anolis hispaniolae Köhler, Zimmer, McGrath, & Hedges, 2019
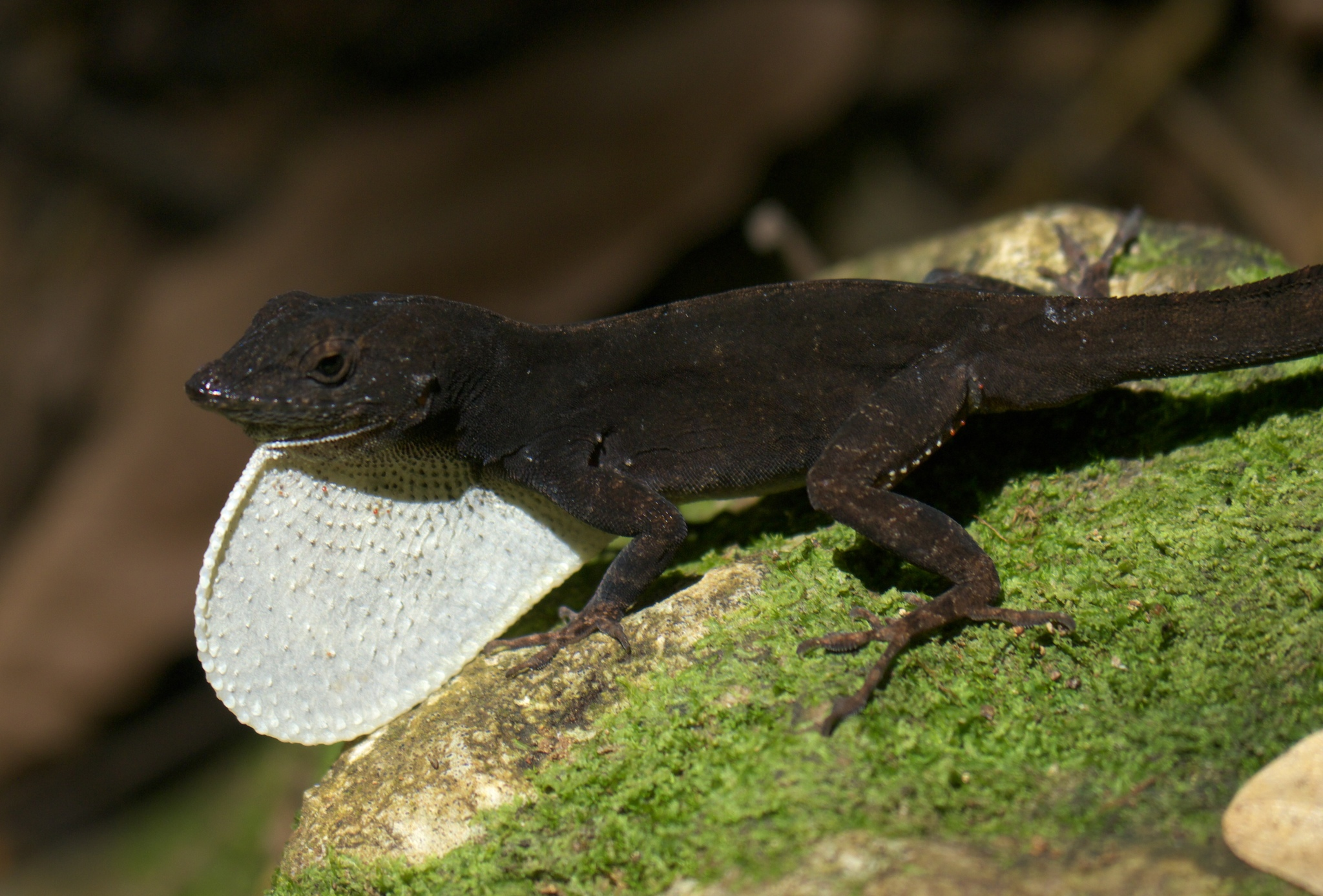
  Habana anole (A. homolechis)
- Anolis hobartsmithi (Nieto-Montes de Oca, 2001) – Hobart Smith's anole
- Anolis homolechis (Cope, 1864) – Habana anole, Cuban white-fanned anole
  - Anolis homolechis homolechis Cope, 1864
  - Anolis homolechis turquinensis Garrido, 1973
- Anolis huilae (Williams, 1982) – Huila anole
- Anolis humilis (Peters, 1863) – humble anole
- Anolis hyacinthogularis Torres-Carvajal, Ayala-Varela, Lobos, Poe, & Narvaez, 2017 – blue dewlap anole

== I ==
- Anolis ibague (Williams, 1975) – Ibague anole
- Anolis ibanezi (Poe, Latella, Ryan, & Schaad, 2009)
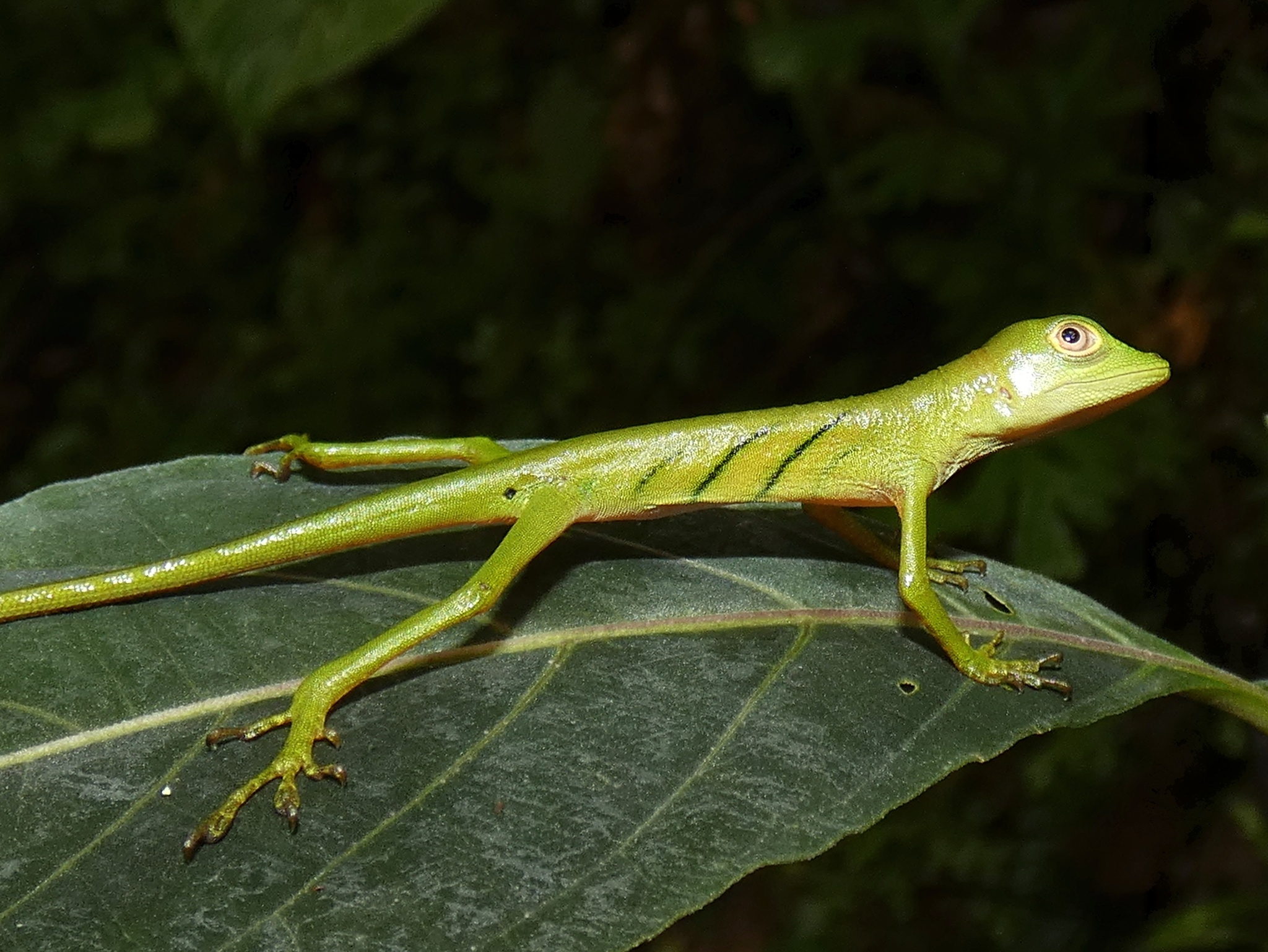
- Ibañez's anole (A. ibanezi)
  Anolis ignigularis Mertens, 1939 – brown bark anole
- Anolis imias (Ruibal & Williams, 1961) – Imias rock anole, Imias anole
- Anolis immaculogularis Köhler et al., 2014
- Anolis impetigosus Cope, 1864
- Anolis incredulus Garrido & Moreno, 1998 – Turquino emerald anole
- Anolis inderenae (Rueda & Hernández-Camacho, 1988)
- Anolis inexpectatus Garrido & Estrada, 1989 – pineland bush anole
- Anolis insignis (Cope, 1871) – decorated anole
- Anolis insolitus (Williams & Rand, 1969) – Cordillera central twig anole, La Palma anole
- Anolis isolepis (Cope, 1861) – dwarf green anole, Jatibonico anole

== J ==
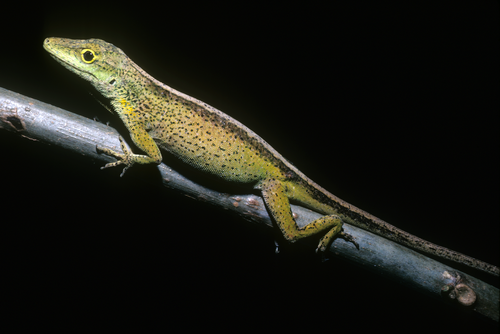
- Jacare anole (A. jacare)
  Anolis jacare (Boulenger, 1903) – Jacare anole
- Anolis johnmeyeri (Wilson & McCranie, 1982) – Meyer's anole
- Anolis juangundlachi Garrido, 1975 – yellow-lipped grass anole, Finca Ceres anole
- Anolis jubar (Schwartz, 1968) – Cuban coast anole, Cubitas anole
  - Anolis jubar albertschwartzi Garrido, 1973
  - Anolis jubar balaenarum Schwartz, 1968
  - Anolis jubar cocoensis Estrada & Garrido, 1990
  - Anolis jubar cuneus Schwartz, 1968
  - Anolis jubar gibarensis Garrido, 1973
  - Anolis jubar jubar Schwartz, 1968
  - Anolis jubar maisiensis Garrido, 1973
  - Anolis jubar oriens Schwartz, 1968
  - Anolis jubar santamariae Garrido, 1973
  - Anolis jubar yagujayensis Garrido, 1973

== K ==
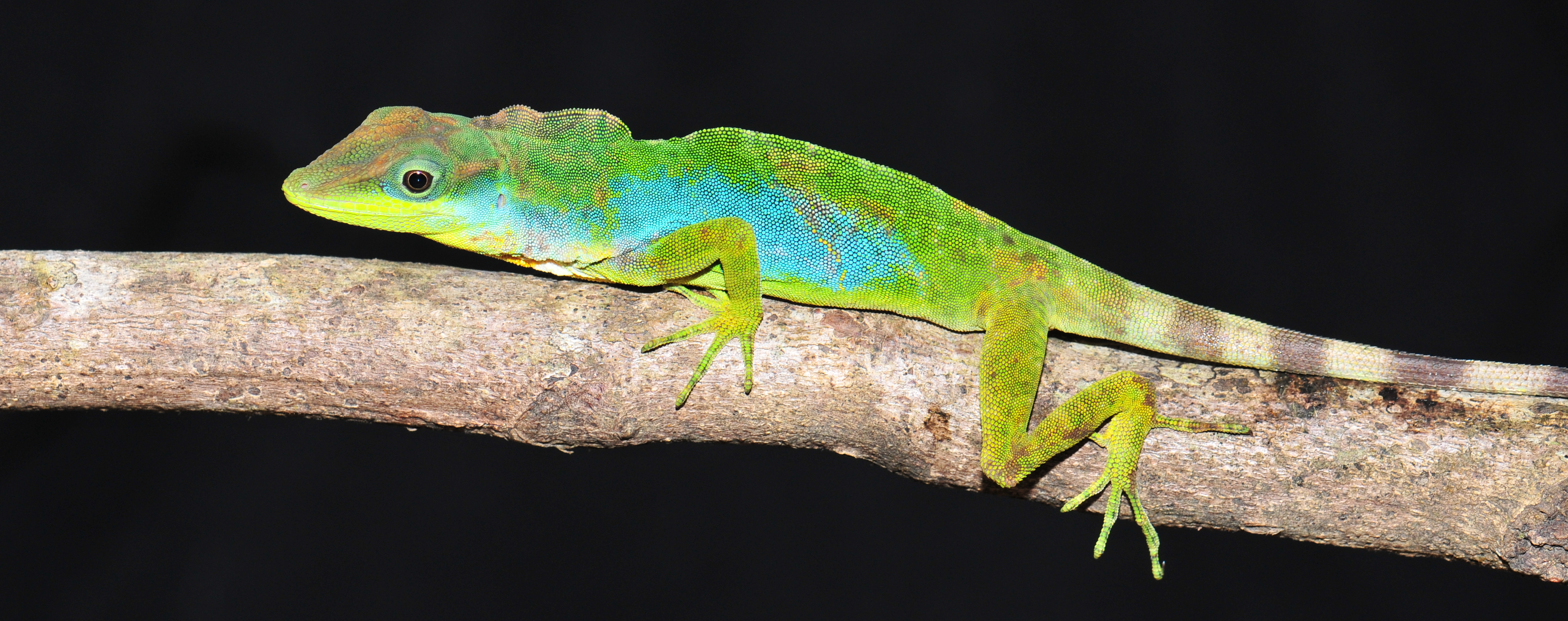
A. kunalayae

- Anolis kahouannensis (Lazell, 1964) – Kahouanne anole
- Anolis kathydayae Poe & Ryan, 2017
- Anolis kemptoni (Dunn, 1940) – Kempton's anole
- Anolis koopmani (Rand, 1961) – Haitian brown red-bellied anole, Koopman's anole
- Anolis kreutzi (McCranie, Köhler, & Wilson, 2000)
- Anolis krugi (Peters, 1877) – olive bush anole, Krug's anole, orange dewlap anole
- Anolis kunalayae (Hulebak, Poe, Ibánez, & Williams, 2007)

== L ==
- Anolis laevis (Cope, 1876) – smooth anole
- Anolis laeviventris (Wiegmann, 1834) – white anole
- Anolis lamari (Williams, 1992)
- Anolis landestoyi Mahler et al. (2016) – Hispaniolan chamaeleon anole
- Anolis latifrons (Berthold, 1846)
- Anolis leachii (Duméril & Bibron, 1837) – Antigua Bank tree anole, Barbuda Bank tree anole, panther anole
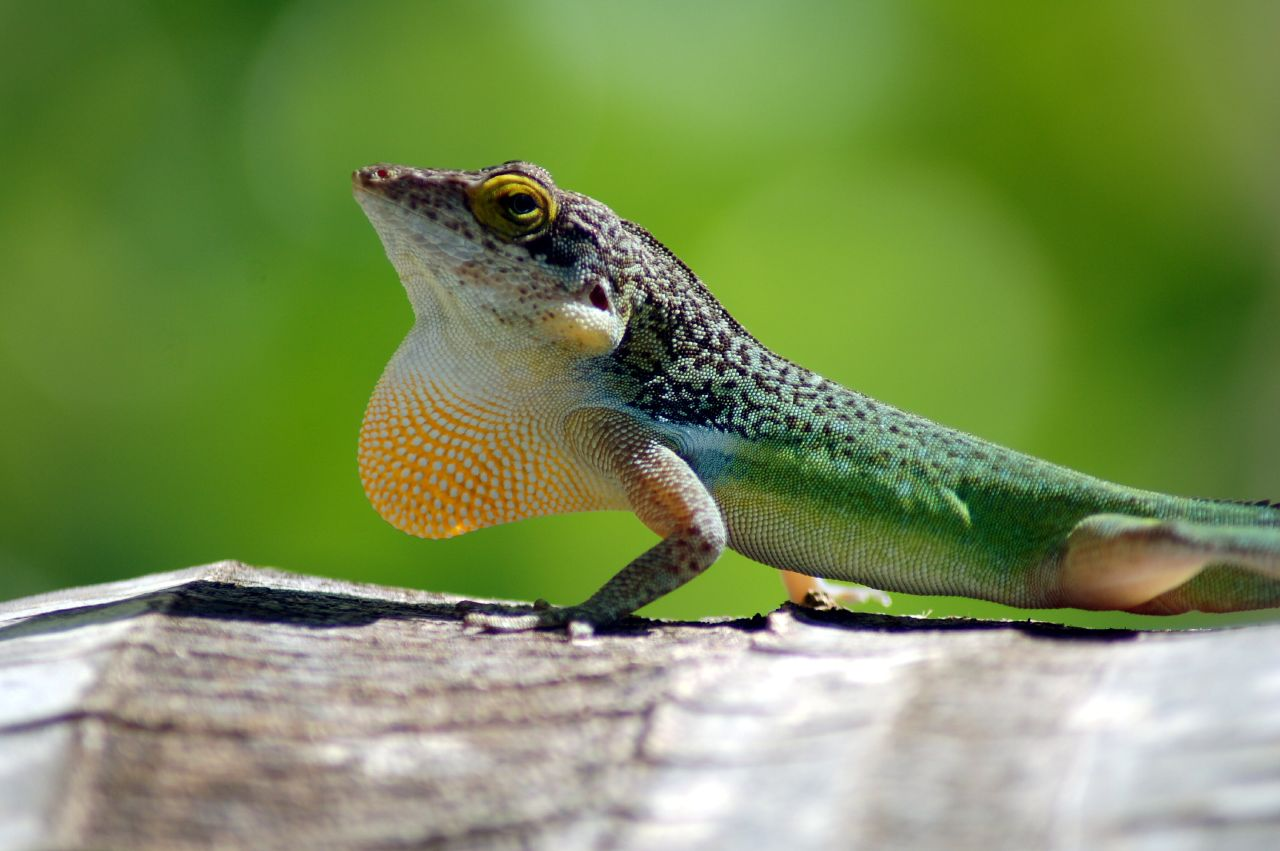
  Leach's anole (A. leachii)
- Anolis leditzigorum Köhler, Vargas, & Lotzkat, 2014
- Anolis lemniscatus (Boulenger, 1898)
- Anolis lemurinus (Cope, 1861) – ghost anole
- Anolis leucodera Kohler & Hedges, 2016 – Bombardopolis green anole
- Anolis limifrons (Cope, 1871) – slender anole, border anole
- Anolis limon Velasco & Hurtado-Gomez, 2014
- Anolis lineatopus Gray, 1840 – Jamaican gray anole, stripefoot anole
  - Anolis lineatopus ahenobarbus] Underwood & Williams, 1959
  - Anolis lineatopus lineatopus Gray, 1840
  - Anolis lineatopus merope Underwood & Williams, 1959
  - Anolis lineatopus neckeri Grant, 1940
- Anolis lineatus (Daudin, 1802) – striped anole
- Anolis liogaster (Boulenger, 1905) – Guerreran anole
- Anolis lionotus (Cope, 1861) – lion anole
- Anolis litoralis Garrido, 1975 – Oriente pallid anole
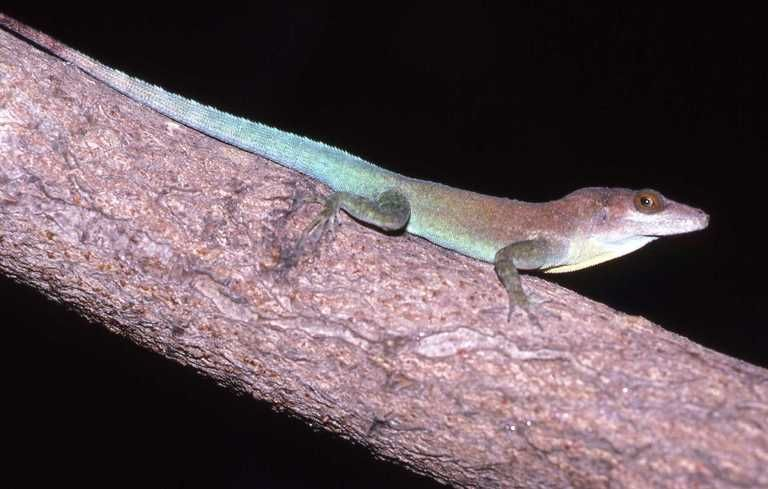
- Plymouth anole (A. lividus)
  Anolis lividus (Garman, 1888) – Plymouth anole, Montserrat anole
- Anolis longiceps Schmidt, 1919 – Navassa anole
- Anolis longitibialis (Noble, 1923) – Barahona stout anole, Isla Beata anole
  - Anolis longitibialis longitibialis Noble, 1923
  - Anolis longitibialis specuum Schwartz, 1979
- Anolis lososi Torres-Carvajal, Ayala-Varela, Lobos, Poe, & Narvaez, 2017 – Losos's anole
- Anolis loveridgei (Schmidt, 1936) – Loveridge's anole
- Anolis loysiana Duméril & Bibron, 1837 – spiny anole, peach anole
- Anolis luciae (Garman, 1888) – St. Lucia anole, Saint Lucian anole
- Anolis lucius Duméril & Bibron, 1837 – cave anole, slender cliff anole
- Anolis luteogularis (Noble & Hassler, 1935) – western giant anole, white-throated anole
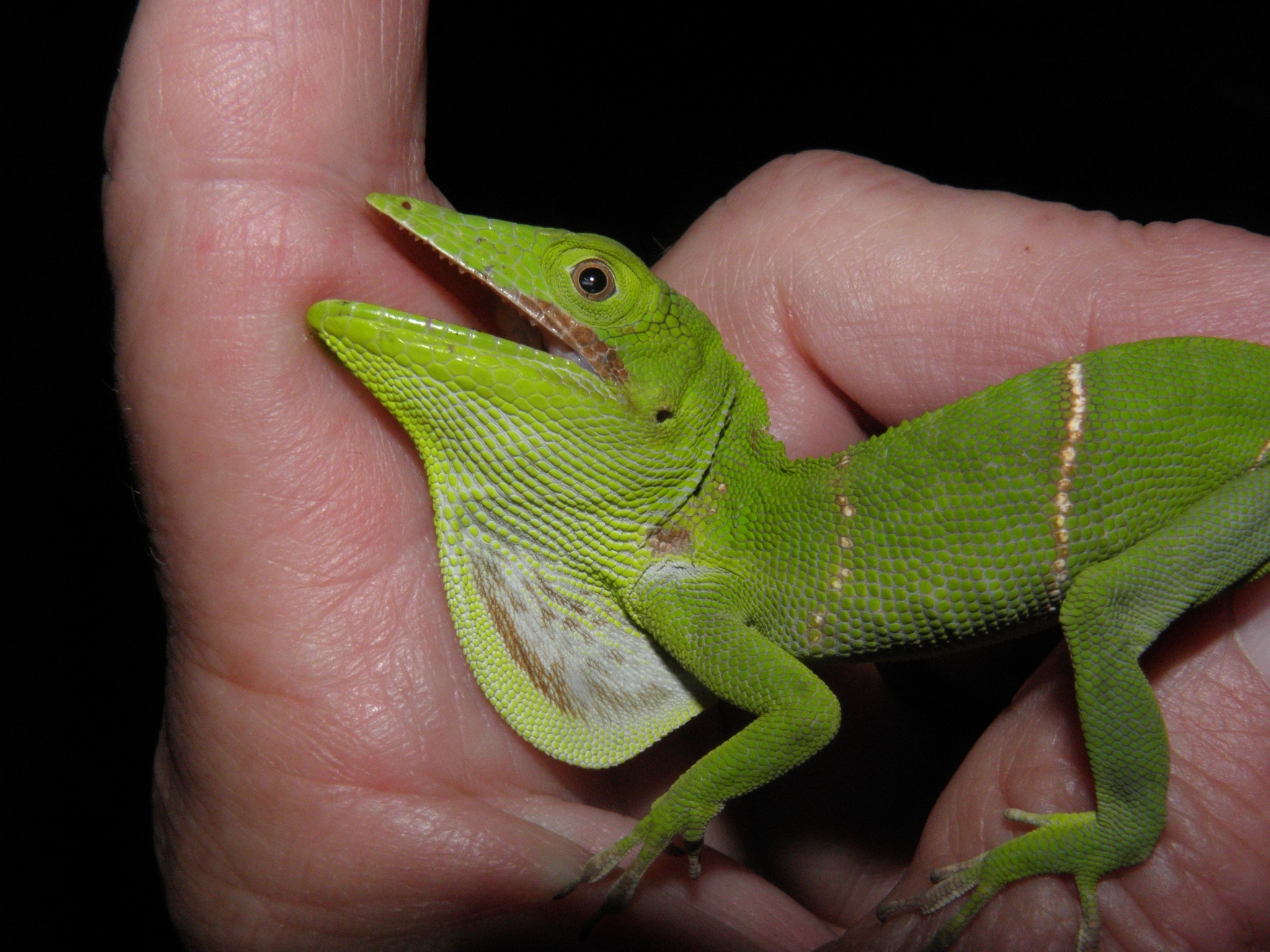
  - Western giant anole (A. luteogularis) juvenile biting hand
    Anolis luteogularis calceus Schwartz & Garrido, 1972
  - Anolis luteogularis coctilis Schwartz & Garrido, 1972
  - Anolis luteogularis delacruzi Schwartz & Garrido, 1972
  - Anolis luteogularis hassleri Barbour & Shreve, 1935
  - Anolis luteogularis jaumei Schwartz & Garrido, 1972
  - Anolis luteogularis luteogularis Noble & Hassler, 1935
  - Anolis luteogularis nivevultus Schwartz & Garrido, 1972
  - Anolis luteogularis sanfelipensis Garrido, 1975
  - Anolis luteogularis sectilis Schwartz & Garrido, 1972
- Anolis luteosignifer (Garman, 1888) – Cayman Brac anole
- Anolis lynchi (Miyata, 1985) – Lynch's anole
- Anolis lyra (Poe, Velasco, Miyata, & Williams, 2009)

== M ==
- Anolis macilentus Garrido & Hedges, 1992 – black-cheeked bush anole
- Anolis macrinii (H.M. Smith, 1968) – Macrinius's anole
- Anolis macrolepis (Boulenger, 1911) – big-scaled anole
- Anolis macrophallus (F. Werner, 1917)
- Anolis maculigula (E. Williams, 1984) – Rueda's anole
- Anolis maculiventris (Boulenger, 1898) – blotchbelly anole
- Anolis magnaphallus (Poe & Ibánez, 2007)
- Anolis maia Batista, Vesely, Mebert, Lotzkat & G. Köhler, 2015
- Anolis marcanoi (E. Williams, 1975) – red-fanned stout anole, Marcano's anole
- Anolis mariarum (Barbour, 1932) – blemished anole
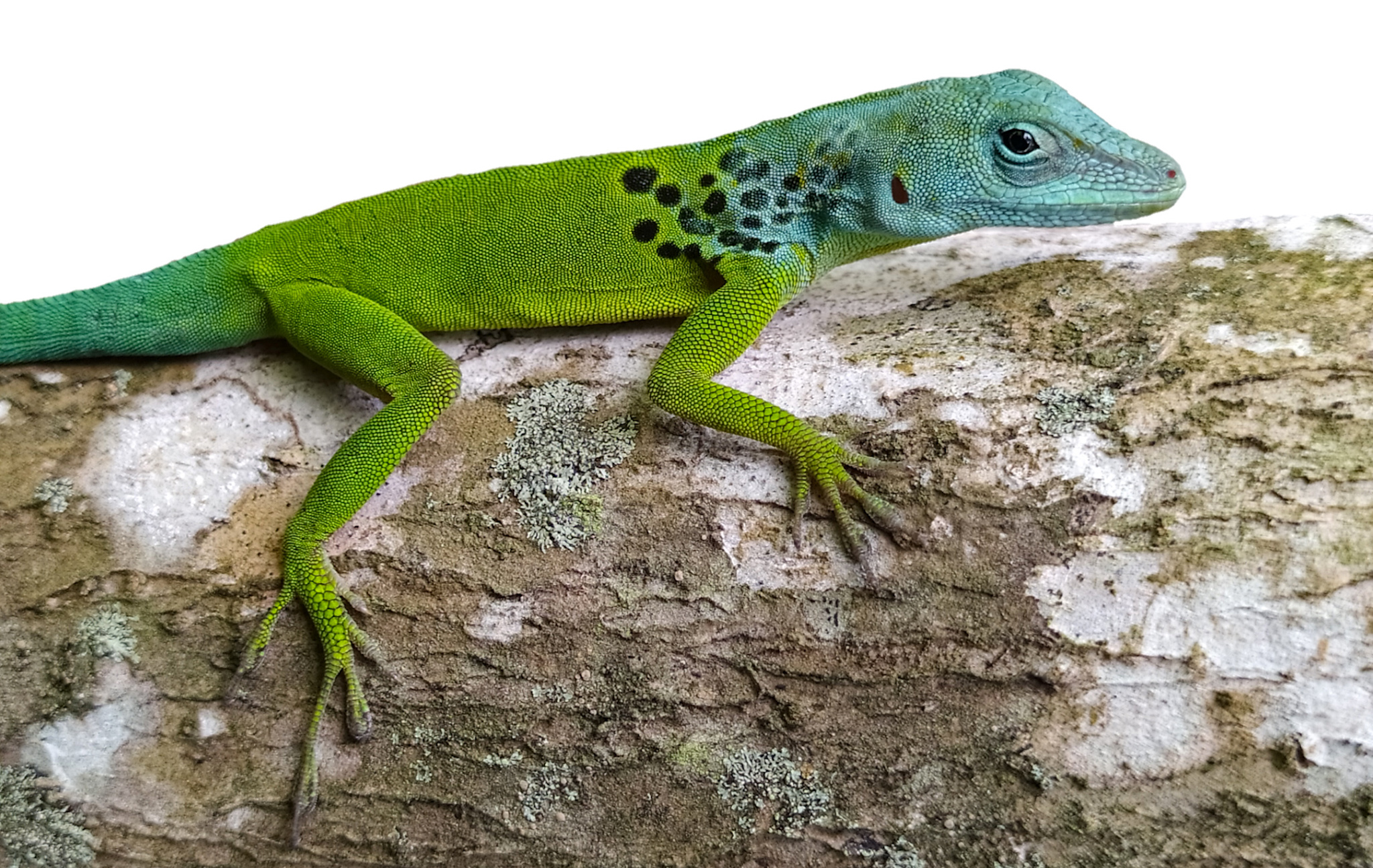
  Leopard anole (A. marmoratus) male
- Anolis marmoratus (A.M.C. Duméril & Bibron, 1837) – Guadeloupe anole, Guadeloupean anole, leopard anole
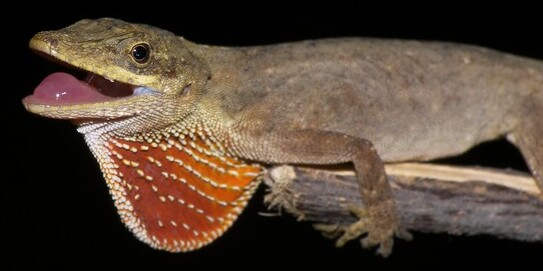
- Blemished anole (A. mariarum)
  Anolis marron (Arnold, 1980) – Jacmel gracile anole, Jacmel anole
- Anolis marsupialis Taylor, 1956
- Anolis matudai (H.M. Smith, 1956) – Matuda's anole
- Anolis maynardii Garman, 1888 – Maynard's anole
- Anolis mccraniei (G. Köhler, Townsend & Petersen, 2016)
- Anolis medemi (Ayala & E. Williams, 1988)
- Anolis megalopithecus (Rueda-Almonacid, 1989) – Ruida's anole
- Anolis megapholidotus Smith, 1933 – large-scaled anole
- Anolis menta (Ayala, Harris & E. Williams, 1984) – mixed anole
- Anolis meridionalis (Boettger, 1885)
- Anolis mestrei Barbour & Ramsden, 1916 – red-fanned rock anole, Pinar del Rio anole
- Anolis microlepidotus (Davis, 1954) – Guerreran oak anole
- Anolis microtus (Cope, 1871) – tiny anole
- Anolis milleri (H.M. Smith, 1950) – Miller's anole
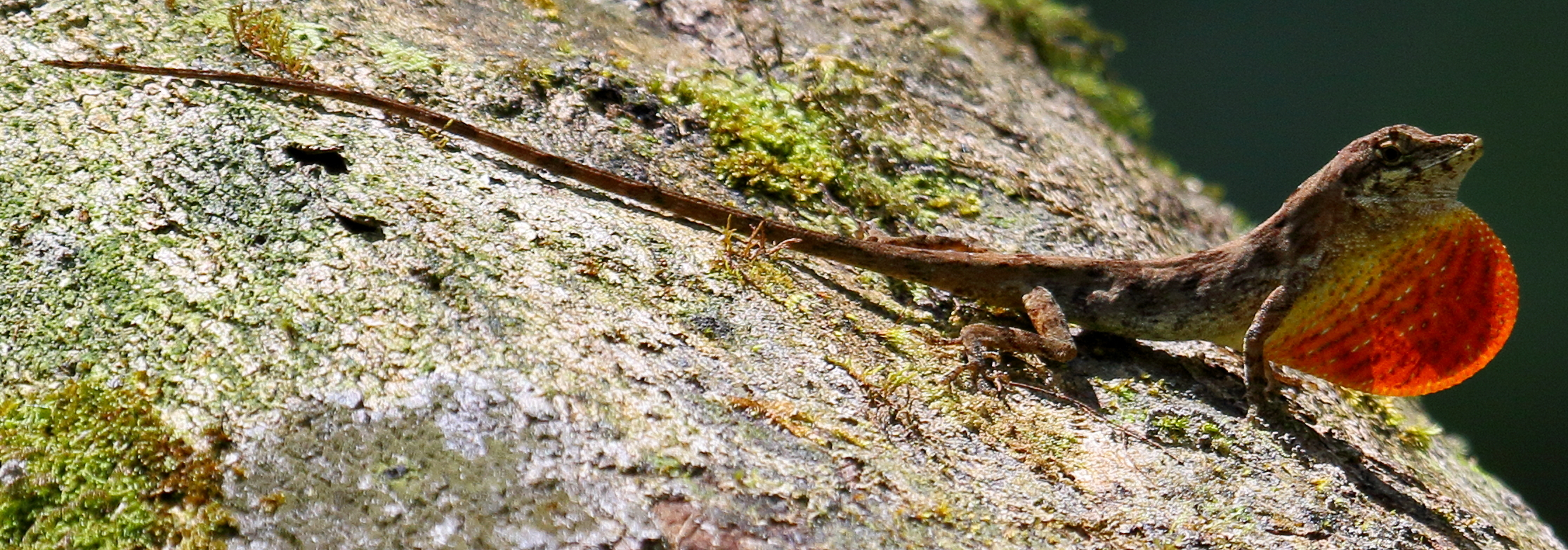
- Putarenas anole (A. monteverde)
  Anolis mirus (E. Williams, 1963)
- Anolis monensis (Stejneger, 1904) – Mona anole
- Anolis monteverde (G. Köhler, 2009)
- Anolis monticola (Shreve, 1936) – La Hotte bush anole, foothill anole
  - Anolis monticola monticola Shreve, 1936
  - Anolis monticola quadrisartus (Thomas & Schwartz, 1967)
- Anolis morazani (Townsend & Wilson, 2009)
- Anolis muralla (Köhler, McCranie & Wilson, 1999)

== N ==
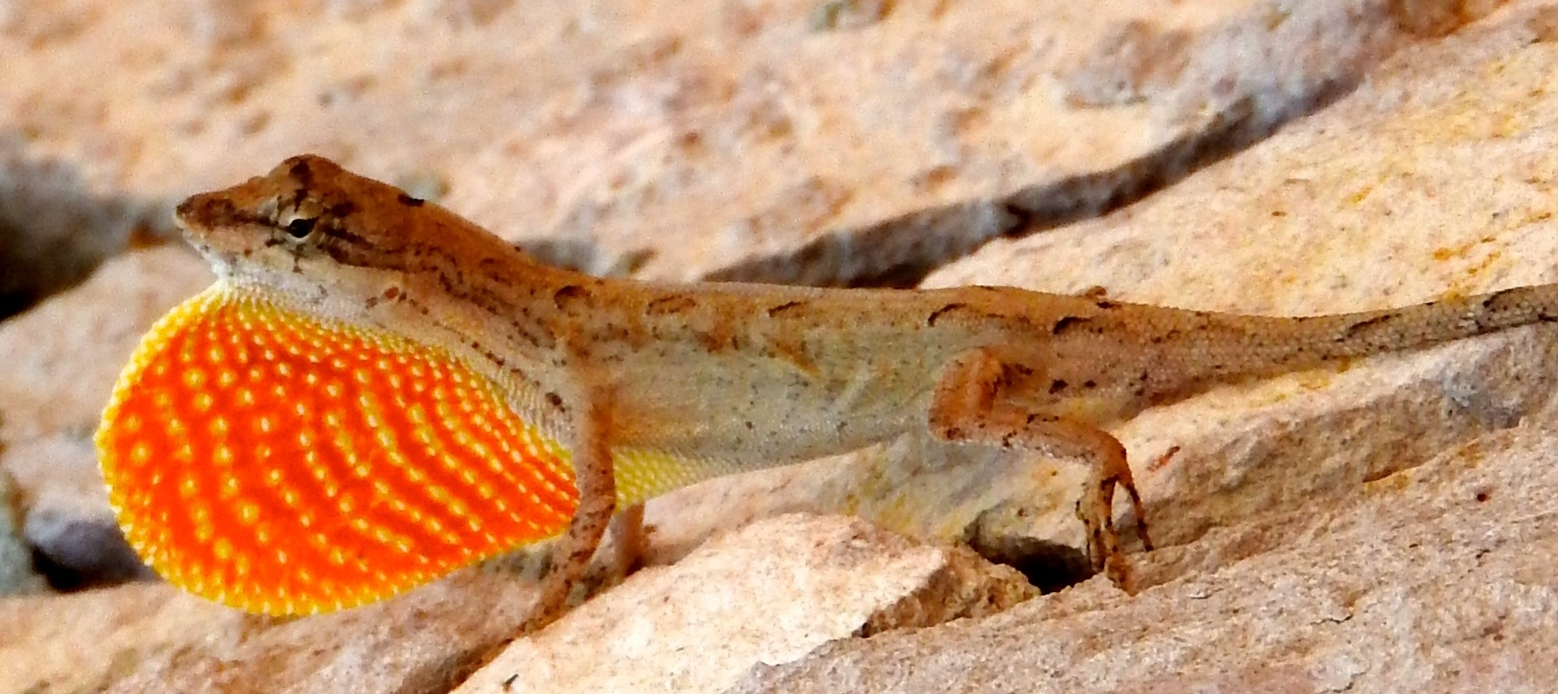
Clouded anole (A. nebulosus)

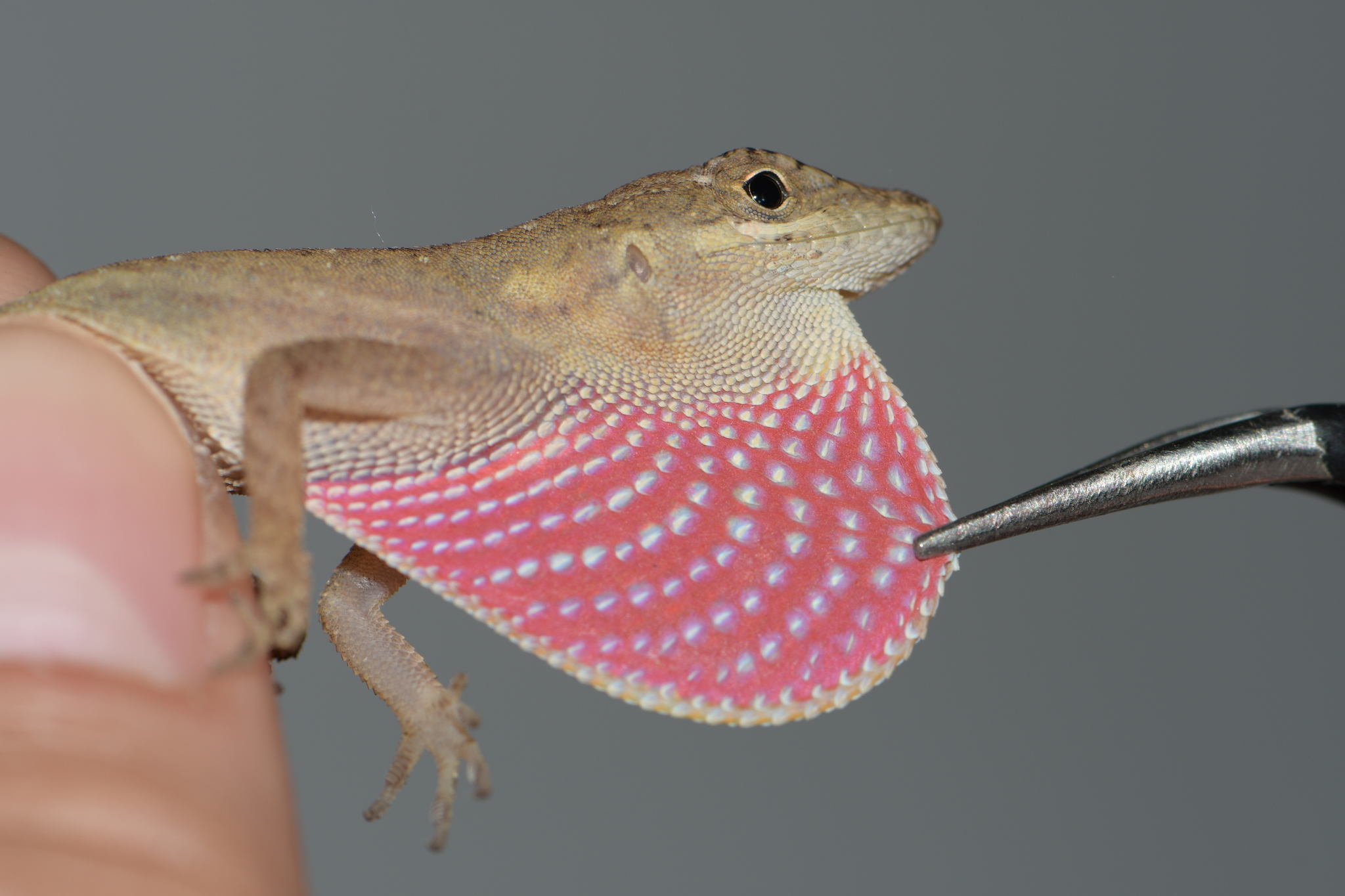
- False clouded anole (A. nebuloides)
  Anolis nasofrontalis (Amaral, 1933) – nose anole
- Anolis naufragus (Campbell, Hillis, & Lamar, 1989) – Hidalgo anole
- Anolis neblininus (Myers, Williams, & McDiarmid, 1993)
- Anolis nebuloides (Bocourt, 1873) – false clouded anole
- Anolis nebulosus (Wiegmann, 1834) – clouded anole
- Anolis neglectus Prates, Melo-Sampaio, de Queiroz, Carnaval, Rodrigues, & Oliveira-Drummond, 2019. – Serra dos Órgãos anole
- Anolis nelsoni (Barbour, 1914) – Swan Islands anole, Nelson's anole
- Anolis nemonteae Ayala-Varela, Valverde, Poe, Narvaez, Yanez-Munoz, & Torres-Carvajal, 2021
- Anolis nicefori (Dunn, 1944) – Niceforo's Andes anole
- Anolis nietoi Köhler et al., 2014
- Anolis nigrolineatus (Williams, 1965)
- Anolis noblei (Barbour & Shreve, 1935) – Oriente giant anole, Holguin anole
- Anolis notopholis (Boulenger, 1896) – scalyback anole
- Anolis nubilis (Garman, 1888) – Redonda anole

== O ==
- Anolis occultus (Williams & Rivero, 1965) – Puerto Rican twig anole, limestone anole, dwarf anole
- Anolis ocelloscapularis (Köhler, McCranie & Wilson, 2001)
- Anolis oculatus (Cope, 1879) – Dominican anole, eyed anole
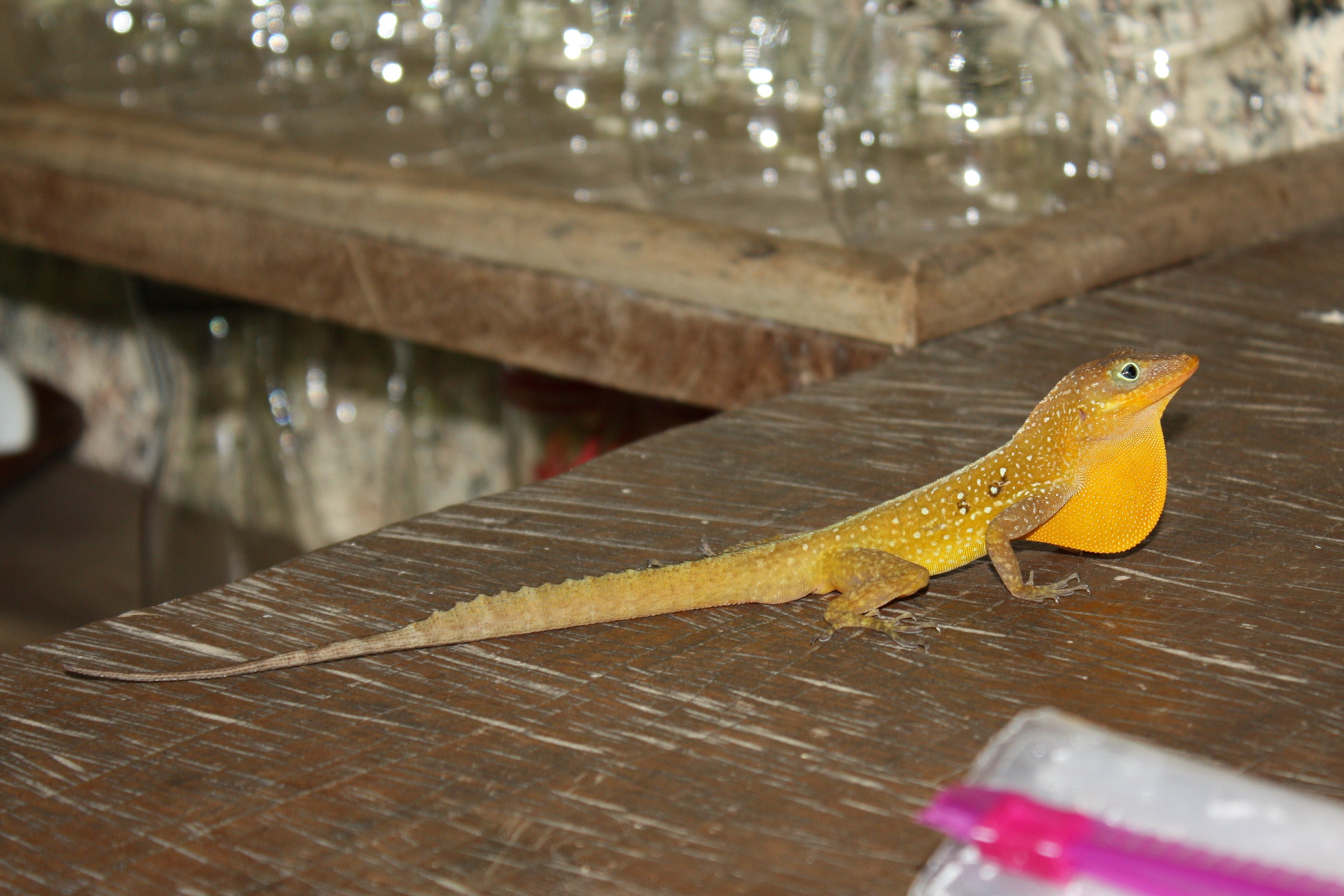
  Dominican anole (A. oculatus)
- Anolis oligaspis Cope, 1894 – Bahama anole
- Anolis olssoni (Schmidt, 1919) – desert grass anole, Monte Cristi anole, Olsson's anole
  - Anolis olssoni alienus Schwartz, 1981
  - Anolis olssoni dominigensis Schwartz, 1981
  - Anolis olssoni extentus Schwartz, 1981
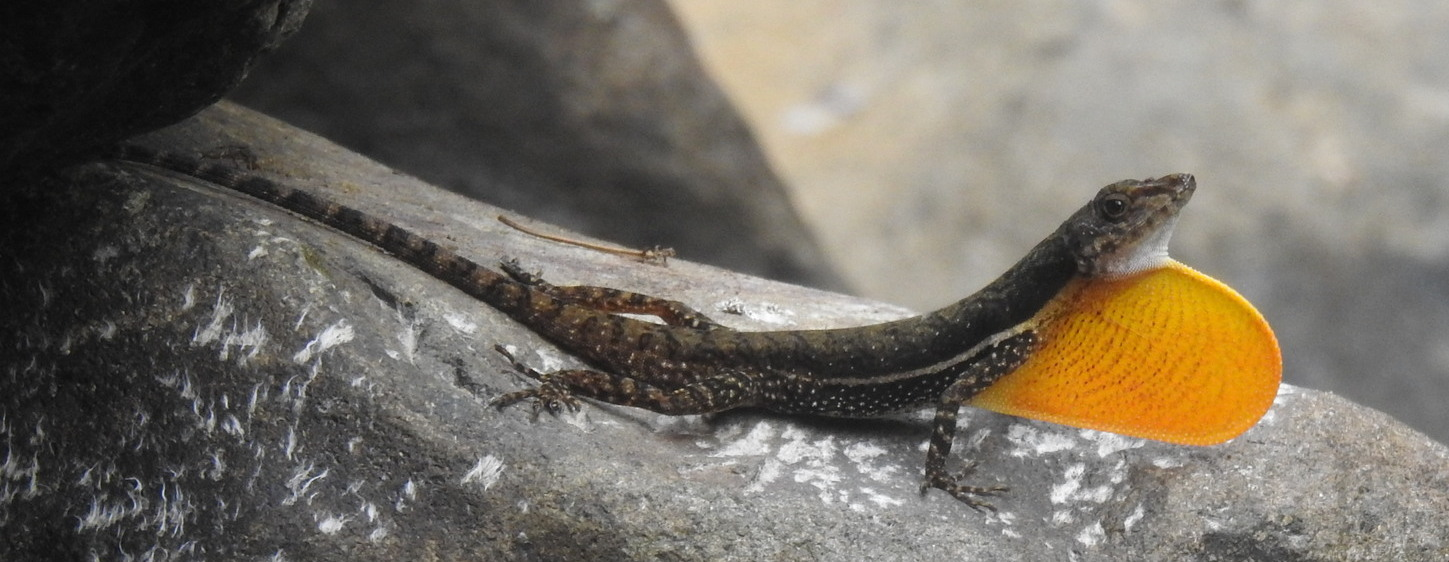
  - Stream anole (A. oxylophus)
    Anolis olssoni ferrugicauda Schwartz, 1981
  - Anolis olssoni insulanus Schwartz, 1981
  - Anolis olssoni montivagus Schwartz, 1981
  - Anolis olssoni olssoni Schmidt, 1919
  - Anolis olssoni palloris Schwartz, 1981
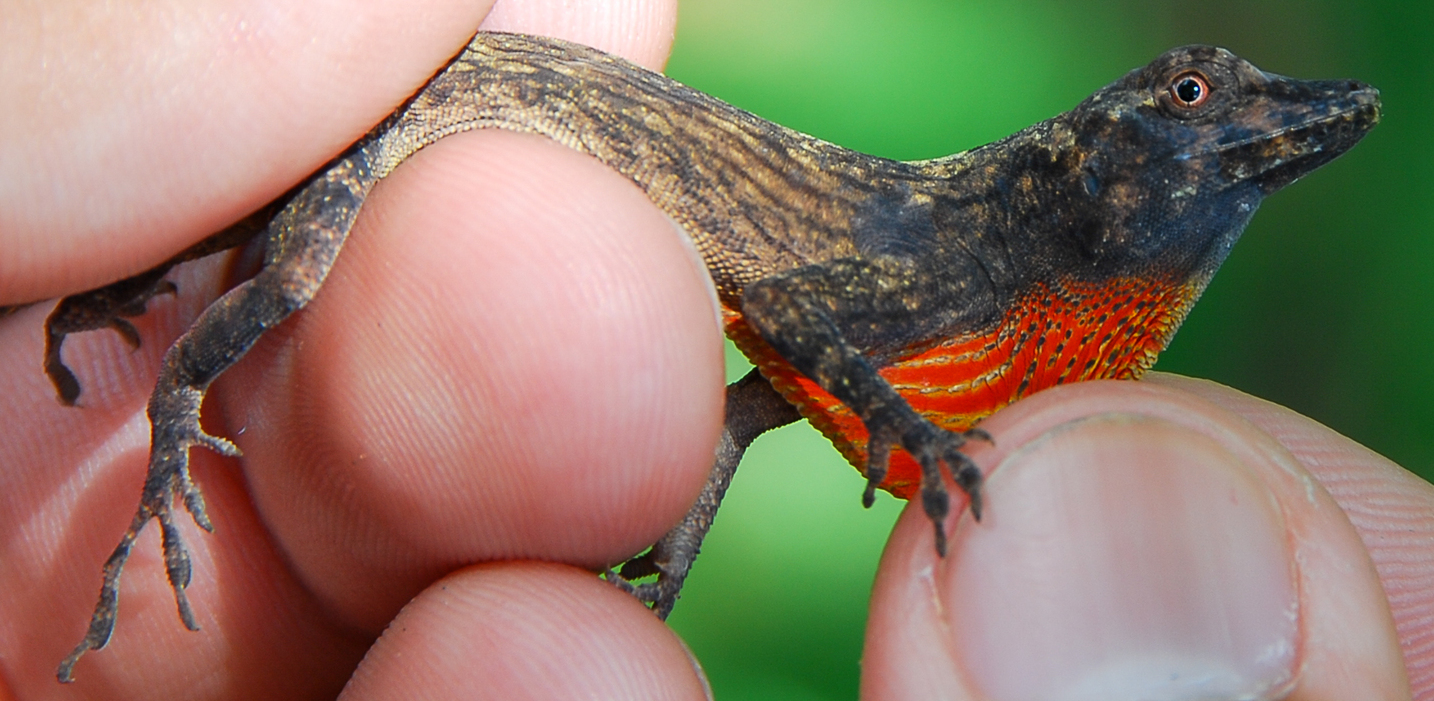
- Orton's anole (A. ortonii)
  Anolis omiltemanus (Davis, 1954) – Omilteme anole
- Anolis onca (O'Shaughnessy, 1875) – bulky anole
- Anolis opalinus (Gosse, 1850) – Jamaican opal-bellied anole, Bluefields anole
- Anolis ophiolepis (Cope, 1862) – five-striped grass anole, snakescale anole
- Anolis oporinus Garrido & Hedges, 2001 – Pimienta green anole
- Anolis orcesi (Lazell, 1969) – Orces's Andes anole
- Anolis ortonii (Cope, 1868) – bark anole, Orton's anole
- Anolis osa (Köhler, Dehling, & Köhler, 2010)
- Anolis otongae (Ayala-Varela & Velasco, 2010)
- Anolis oxylophus (Cope, 1868) – stream anole

== P ==
- Anolis pachypus (Cope, 1876)
- Anolis parilis (Williams, 1975) – Ecuador anole
- Anolis parvauritus (Williams, 1966) – giant green anole, neotropical green anole
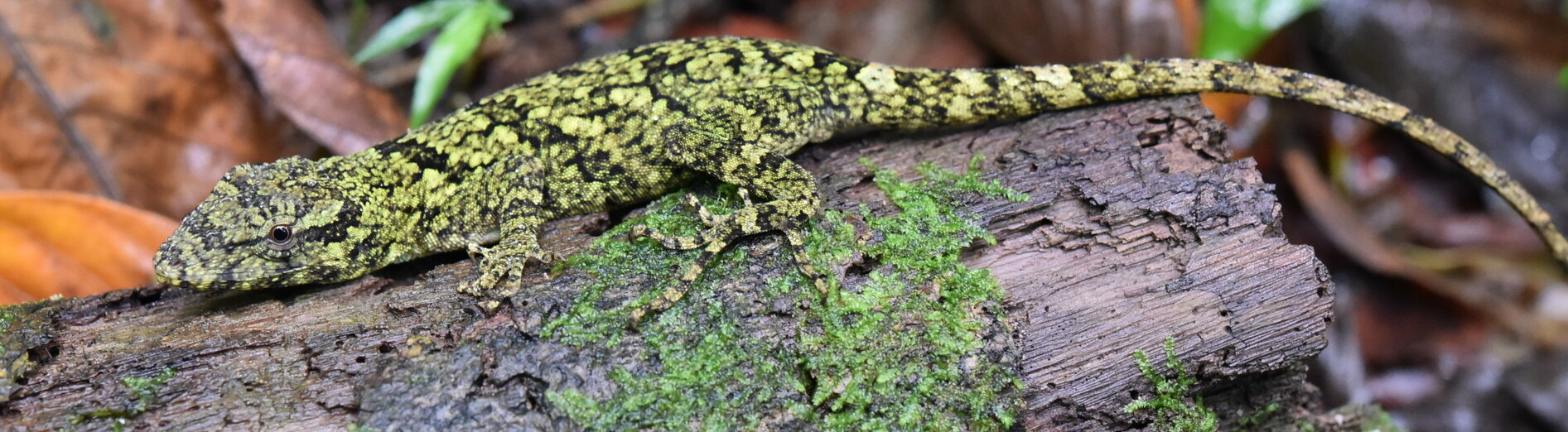
- Peter's anole (A. petersii)
  Anolis parvicirculatus (Álvarez del Toro & H.M. Smith, 1956) – Berriozabal anole
- Anolis paternus Hardy, 1967 – ashy bush anole, Nueva Gerona anole
  - Anolis paternus paternus Hardy, 1967
  - Anolis paternus pinarensis Garrido, 1975
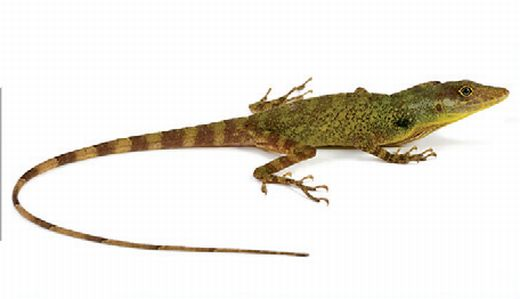
    A. podocarpus (male)
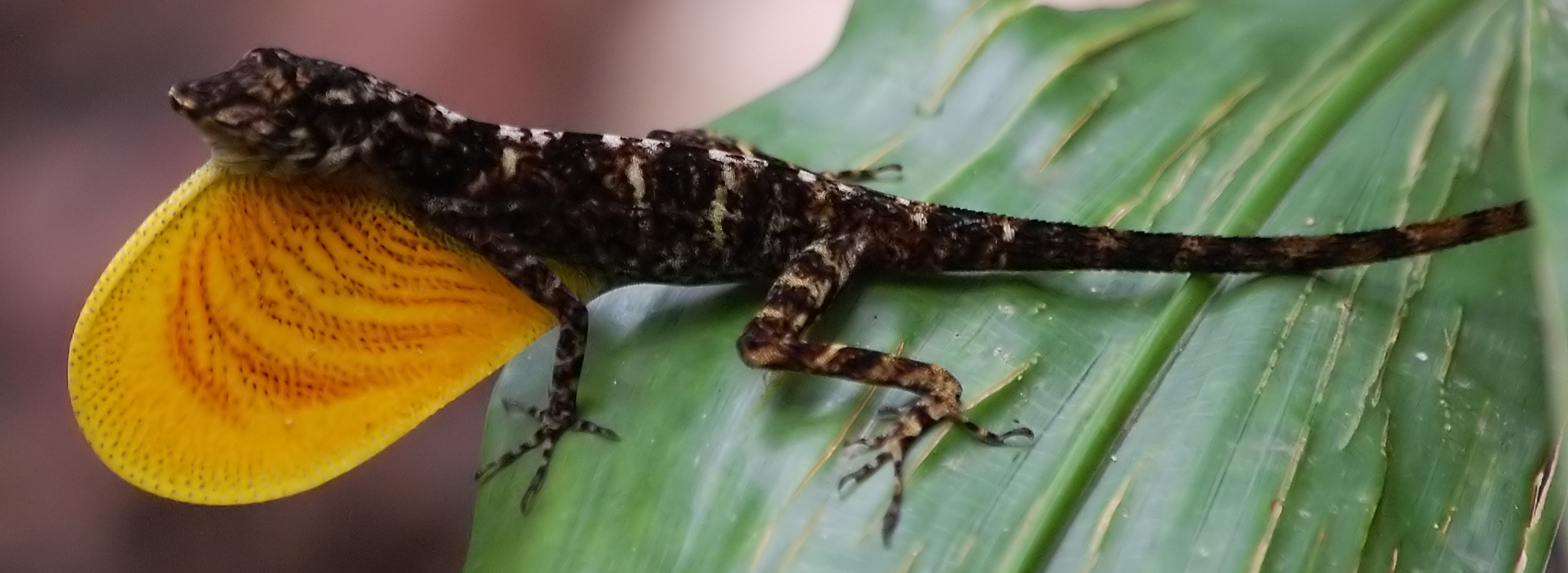
    Many-scaled anole (A. polylepis)
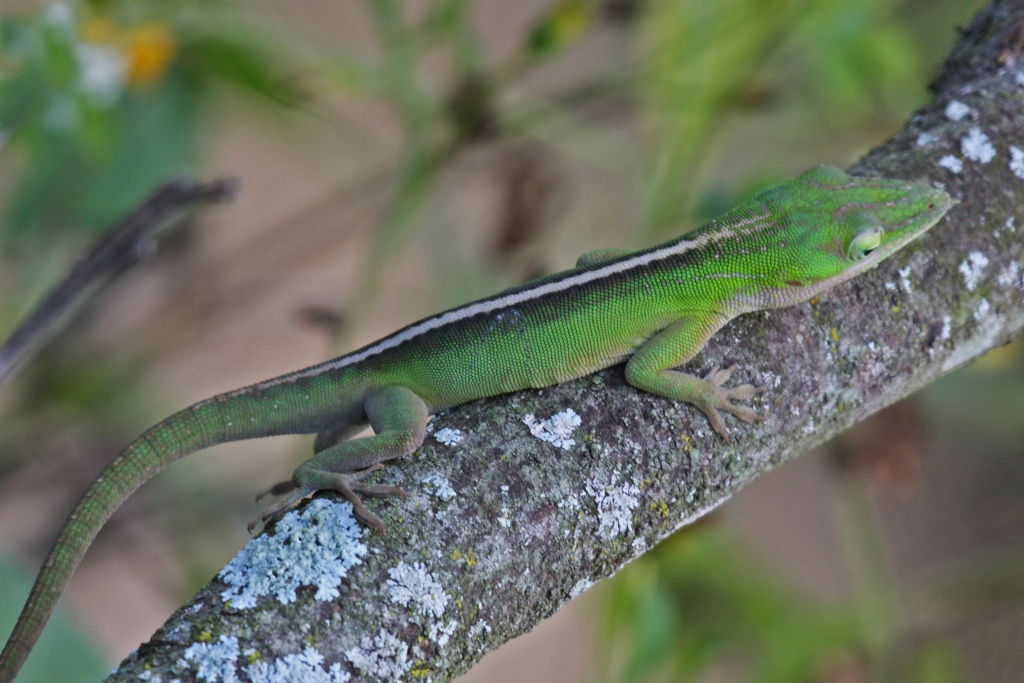
    Cuban green anole (A. porcatus)
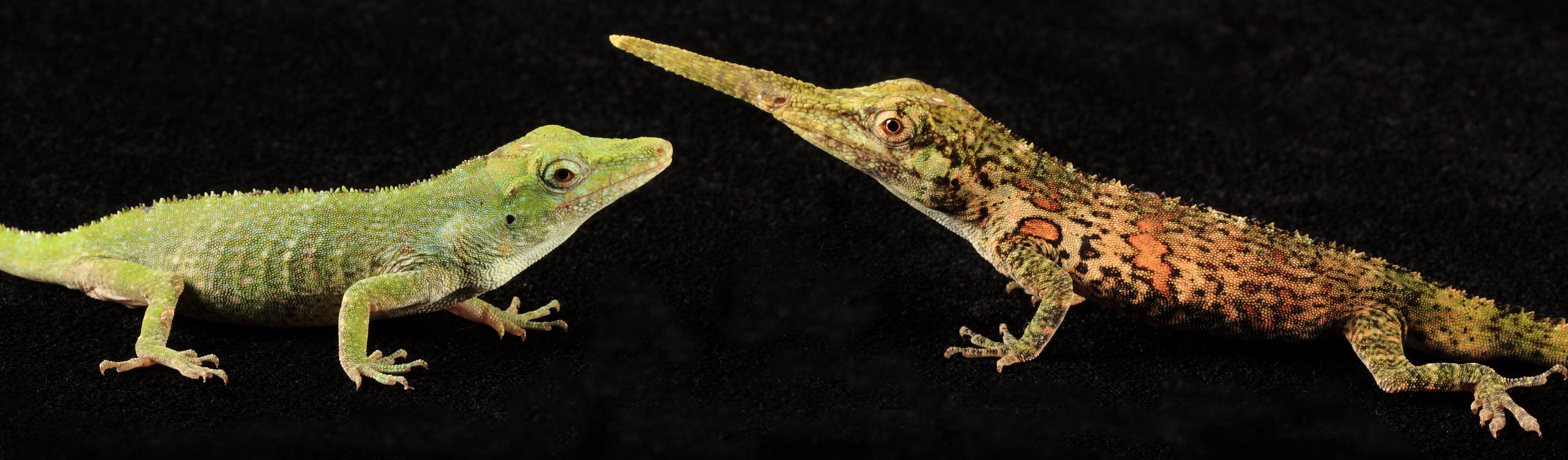
    Horned anole (A. proboscis), female (left) and male (right)
- Anolis pecuarius Schwartz, 1969 – Île-à-Vache green anole
- Anolis pentaprion (Cope, 1863) – lichen anole
- Anolis peraccae (Boulenger, 1898)
- Anolis peruensis Poe, Latella, Ayala-Varela, Yañez-Miranda, & Torres-Carvajal, 2015
- Anolis petersii (Bocourt, 1873) – Peters's anole
- Anolis peucephilus Kohler, Trejo-Perez, Petersen, & Mendez De La Cruz, 2014
- Anolis peynadoi Mertens, 1939 – western Hispaniola green anole, northern Hispaniolan green anole, Hispaniolan green anole
- Anolis phyllorhinus (Myers & Carvalho, 1945) – leaf-nosed anole, bat anole
- Anolis pigmaequestris (Garrido, 1975) – pygmy giant anole, Cayo Francés anole
- Anolis pijolense (McCranie, Wilson, & Williams, 1993)
- Anolis pinchoti Cochran, 1931 – Crab Cay anole
- Anolis placidus Hedges & Thomas, 1989 – Neiba twig anole, placid anole
- Anolis planiceps Troschel, 1848 – golden-scaled anole, orange-fanned leaf-litter anole, goldenscale anole
- Anolis podocarpus (Ayala-Varela & Torres-Carvajal, 2010)
- Anolis poecilopus (Cope, 1862) – dappled anole
- Anolis poei Ayala-Varela, Troya-Rodríguez, Talero-Rodríguez, & Torres-Carvajal, 2014 – Telimbela anole
- Anolis pogus (Lazell, 1972) – Anguilla Bank bush anole, Watts's anole
- Anolis polylepis (Peters, 1874) – many-scaled anole, Golfo-Dulce anole
- Anolis poncensis (Stejneger, 1904) – Ponce anole
- Anolis porcatus |Gray, 1840 – Cuban green anole
  - Anolis porcatus aracelyae Perez-Beato, 1996
  - Anolis porcatus porcatus Gray, 1840
- Anolis porcus (Cope, 1864) – Oriente bearded anole
- Anolis prasinorius Kohler & Hedges, 2016 – Baoruco green twig anole
- Anolis princeps (Boulenger, 1902) – first anole
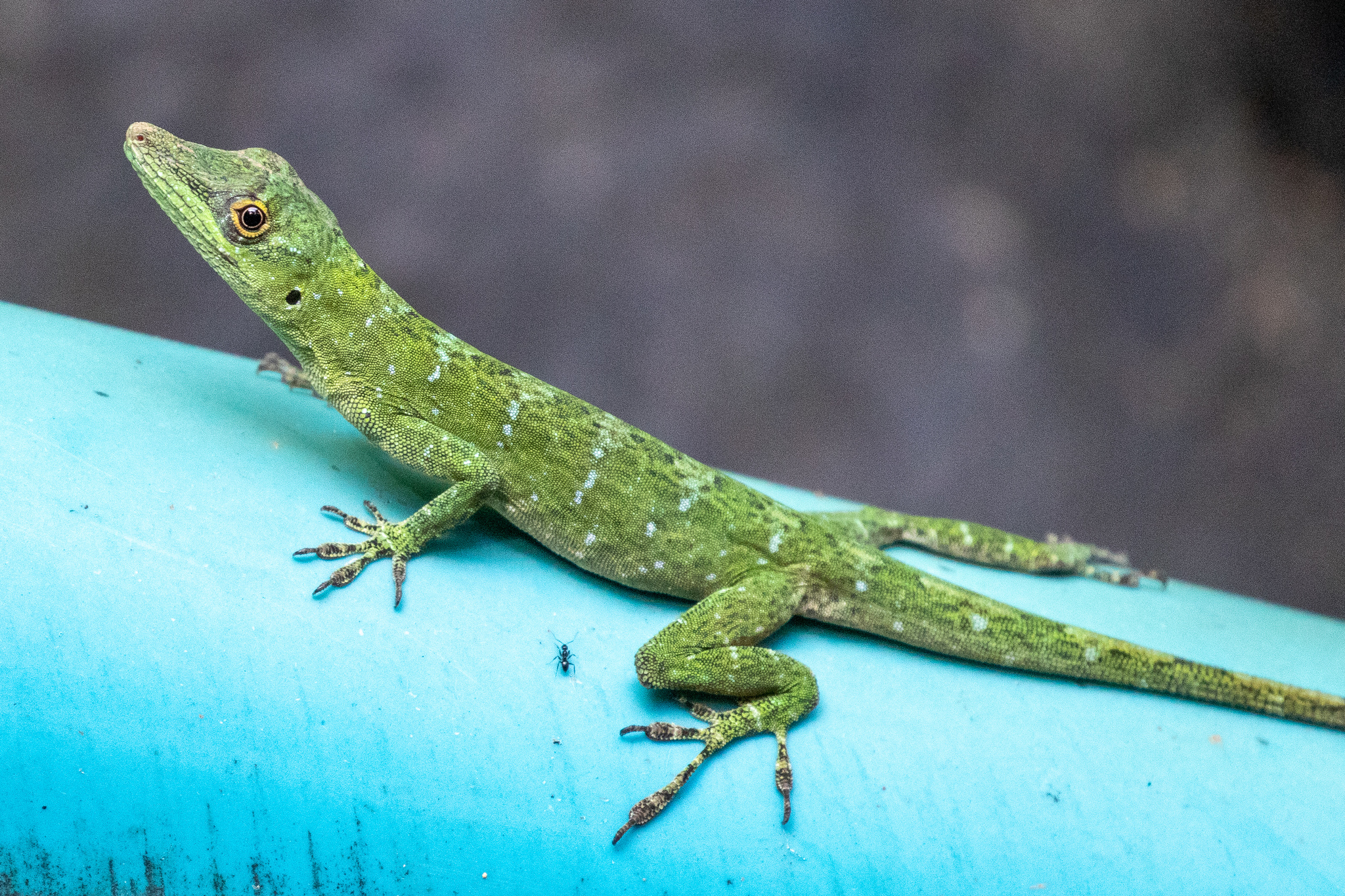
- Amazon green anole (A. punctatus)
  Anolis proboscis (Peters & Orces, 1956) – horned anole, Pinocchio lizard
- Anolis properus Schwartz, 1968 – Hispaniolan gracile anole, bark anole
- Anolis propinquus (Williams, 1984)
- Anolis pseudokemptoni (Köhler, Ponce, Sunyer, & Batista, 2007)
- Anolis pseudopachypus (Köhler, Ponce, Sunyer, & Batista, 2007)
- Anolis pseudotigrinus (Amaral, 1933) – false tiger anole
- Anolis pulchellus Duméril & Bibron, 1837 – Puerto Rican bush anole, Puerto Rican anole, snake anole
- Anolis pumilus Garrido, 1988 – Cuban spiny-plant anole
- Anolis punctatus (Daudin, 1802) – spotted anole, Amazon green anole
  - Anolis punctatus boulengeri O'Shaughnessy, 1881
  - Anolis punctatus punctatus Daudin, 1802
- Anolis purpurescens (Cope, 1899) – purple anole
- Anolis purpurgularis (McCranie, Cruz, & Holm, 1993)
- Anolis purpuronectes Gray, Meza-Lazaro, Poe, & Nieto-Montes De Oca, 2016
- Anolis pygmaeus (Álvarez del Toro & H.M Smith, 1956) – Chiapis pygmy anole

== Q ==
- Anolis quadriocellifer (Barbour & Ramsden, 1919) – Cuban eyespot anole, peninsula anole
- Anolis quaggulus (Cope, 1885)
- Anolis quercorum (Fitch, 1979) – Oaxacan oak anole, gray anole
- Anolis quimbaya Moreno-Arias, Méndez-Galeano, Beltrán, & Vargas-Ramírez, 2023 – Quimbaya anole

== R ==
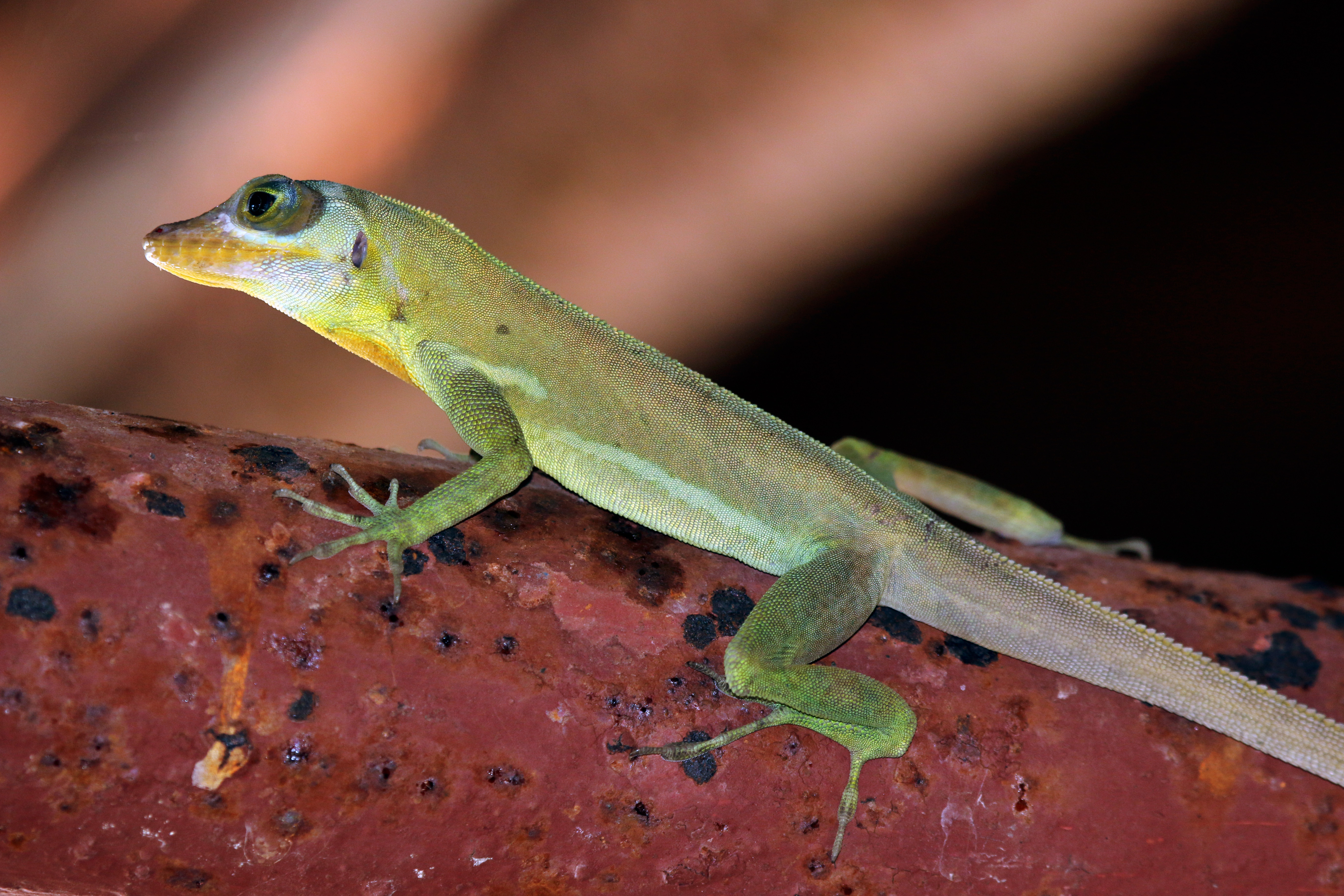
- Grenada tree anole (A. richardii)
  Anolis ravifaux Schwartz & Henderson, 1982 - Saona stout anole
- Anolis ravitergum Schwartz, 1968 - Hispaniolan gracile anole, bark anole
- Anolis reconditus (Underwood & Williams, 1959) – Blue Mountains anole
- Anolis rejectus Garrido & Schwartz, 1972 – Santiago grass anole
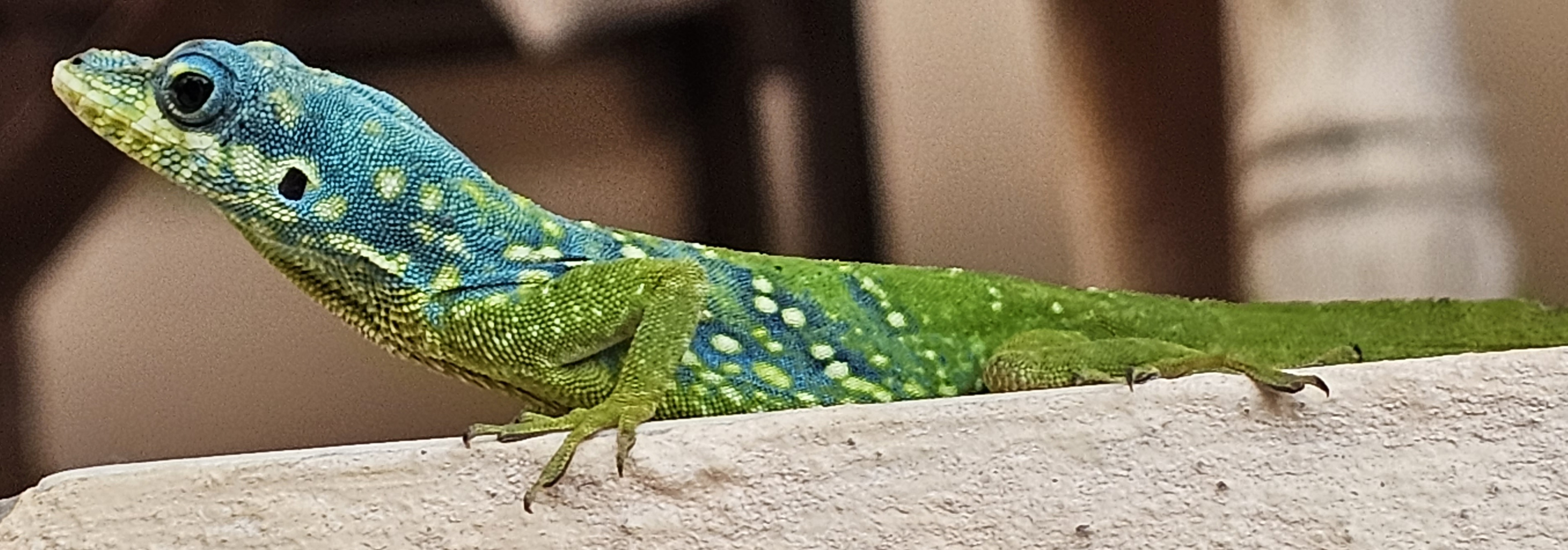
- Martinique's anole (A. roquet)
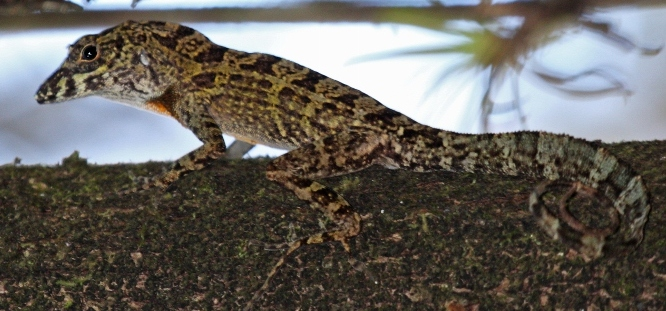
  Sagua de Tánamo anole (A. rubribarbus)
  Anolis richardii (Duméril & Bibron, 1837) – Grenada tree anole
- Anolis richteri (Dunn,1944) – flat Andes anole
- Anolis ricordii (Duméril & Bibron, 1837) – Haitian giant anole, Haitian green anole
  - Anolis ricordi leberi Williams, 1965
  - Anolis ricordi ricordi Duméril & Bibron, 1837
  - Anolis ricordi subsolanus Schwartz, 1974
  - Anolis ricordi viculus Schwartz, 1974
- Anolis rimarum (Thomas & Schwartz, 1967) – Artibonite bush anole, marmelade anole
- Anolis riparius Chaves, Ryan, Bolaños, Márquez, Köhler & Poe, 2023
- Anolis rivalis (Williams, 1984) – neighbor anole
- Anolis roatanensis (Köhler & McCranie, 2001) – Roatan anole
- Anolis robinsoni Chaves, Ryan, Bolaños, Márquez, Köhler & Poe, 2023
- Anolis rodriguezii Bocourt, 1873 – Middle American smooth anole, Rodriguez's anole
- Anolis roosevelti Grant, 1931 – Virgin Islands giant anole, Culebra Island giant anole
- Anolis roquet (Lacépède, 1788) – savannah anole, Martinique anole, Martinique's anole
  - Anolis roquet majolgris Lazell, 1972
  - Anolis roquet roquet (Lacépède, 1788)
  - Anolis roquet salinei Lazell, 1972
  - Anolis roquet summus Lazell, 1972
  - Anolis roquet zebrilus Lazell, 1972
- Anolis rubiginosus Bocourt, 1873 – Sierra Juarez anole
- Anolis rubribarbaris (Köhler, McCranie, & Wilson 1999)
- Anolis rubribarbus (Barbour & Ramsden, 1919) – Sagua de Tánamo anole
- Anolis ruibali Navarro & Garrido, 2004 – Cabo Cruz pallid anole
- Anolis ruizi (Rueda & Williams, 1986)
- Anolis rupinae (Williams & Webster, 1974) – Haitian banded red-bellied anole, Castillon anole

== S ==
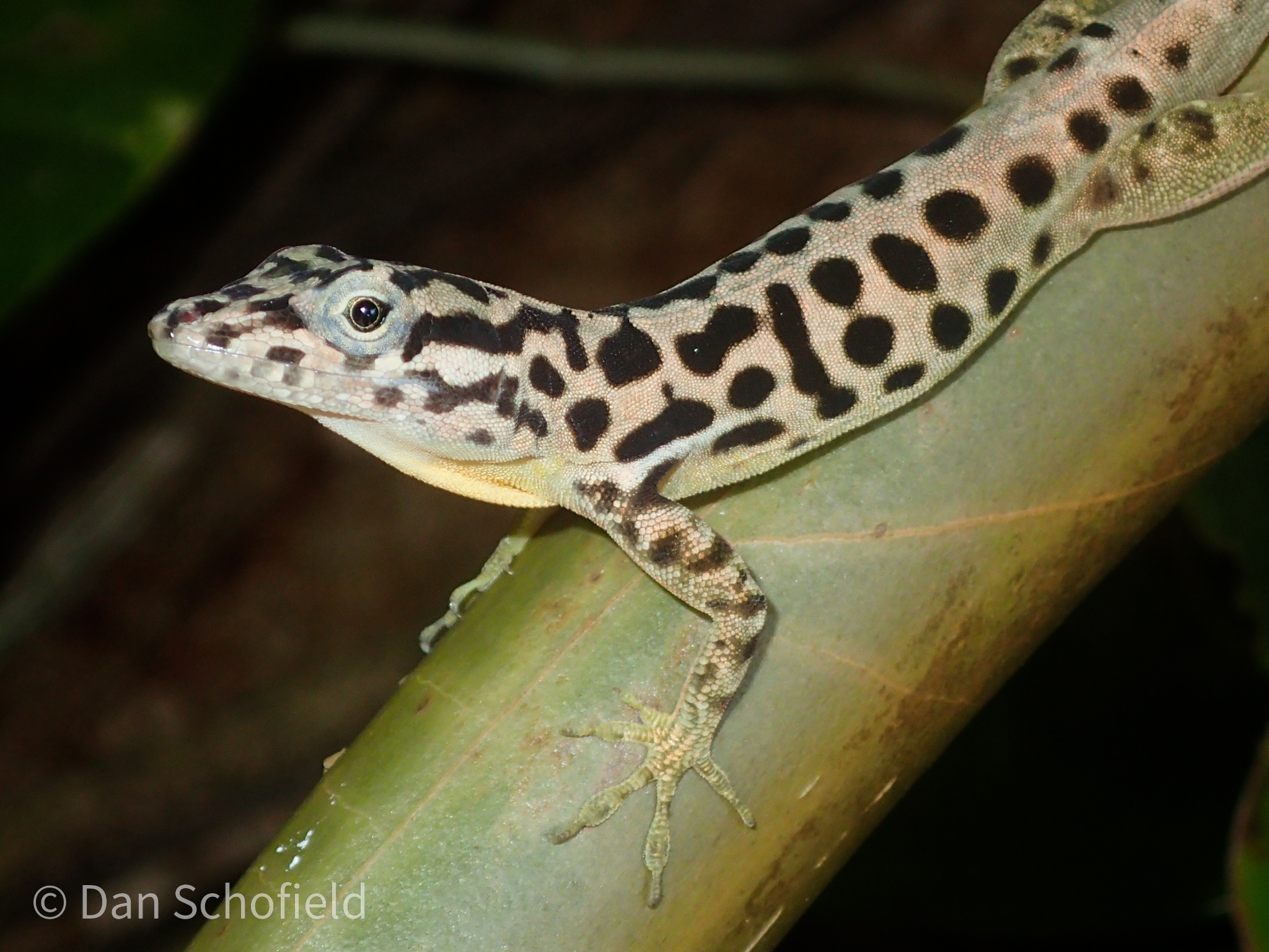
Saban anole (Anolis sabanus)

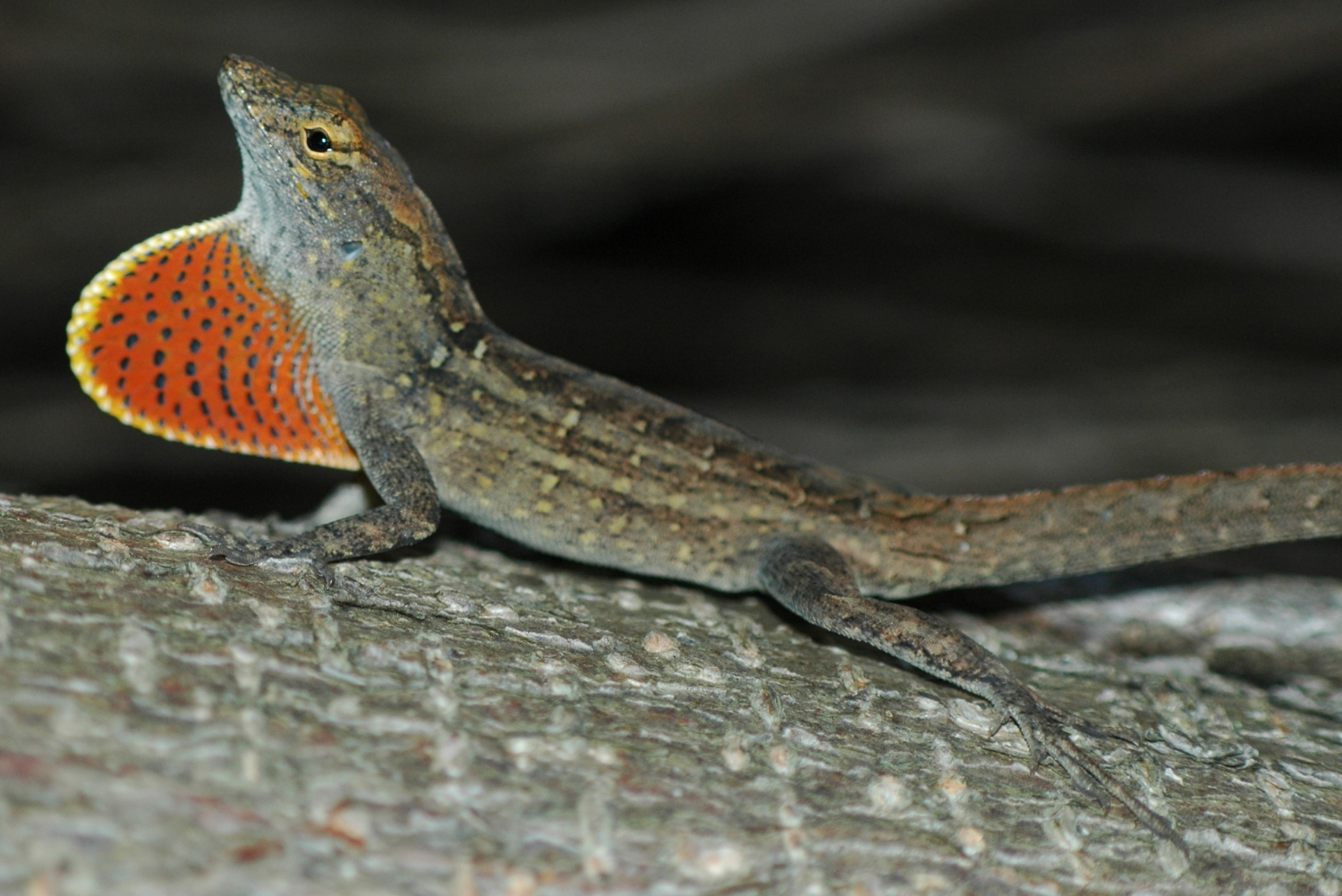
Anolis sagrei, brown anole

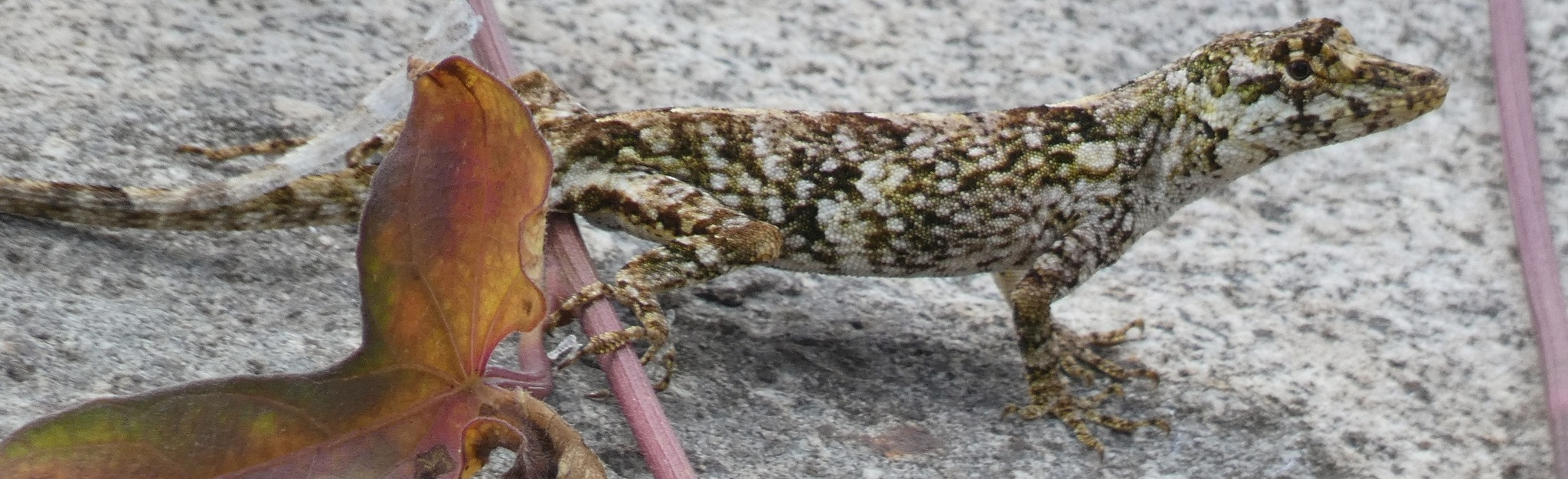
Salvin's anole (A. salvini)

- Anolis sabanus Garman, 1887 – Saban anole
- Anolis sacamecatensis G. Köhler et al., 2014
- Anolis sagrei Duméril & Bibron, 1837 – Cuban brown anole, brown anole
  - Anolis sagrei mayensis H.M. Smith & Burger, 1949
  - Anolis sagrei sagrei Duméril & Bibron, 1837
- Anolis salvini Boulenger, 1885 – Salvin's anole
- Anolis santamartae E. Williams, 1982 – Santa Marta anole
- Anolis savagei Poe & Ryan, 2017
- Anolis saxatilis Mertens, 1938 – palid stout anole, Whiteman's anole
  - Anolis saxatilis lapidosus Schwartz, 1980
  - Anolis saxatilis saxatilis Williams, 1963
- Anolis schiedei (Wiegmann, 1834) – Schiede's anole
- Anolis schwartzi Lazell, 1972 – Saint Kitts Bank bush anole, Schwartz's anole, Statia Bank bush anole
- Anolis scriptus Garman, 1887 – southern Bahamas anole, Silver Key anole
  - Anolis scriptus leucophaeus Garman, 1888
  - Anolis scriptus mariguanae Cochran, 1931
  - Anolis scriptus scriptus Garman, 1887
  - Anolis scriptus sularum Barbour & Shreve, 1935
- Anolis scypheus Cope, 1864 – yellow-tongued anole
- Anolis semilineatus Cope, 1864 – Hispaniolan grass anole, Santo Domingo anole, half-lined Hispaniolan grass anole
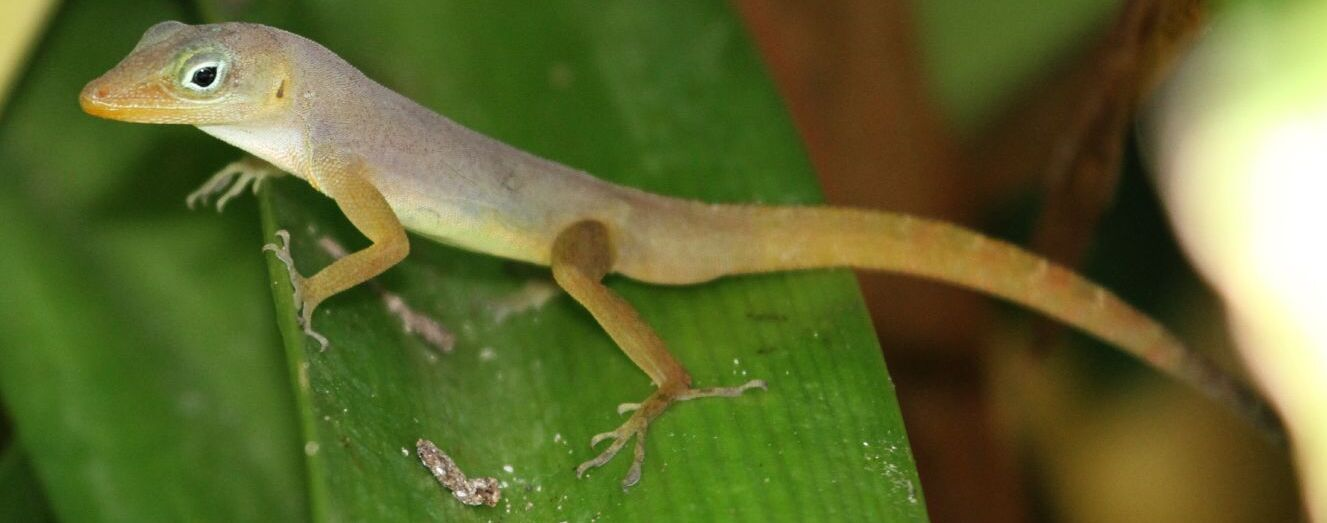
- Schwartz's anole (A. schwartzi)
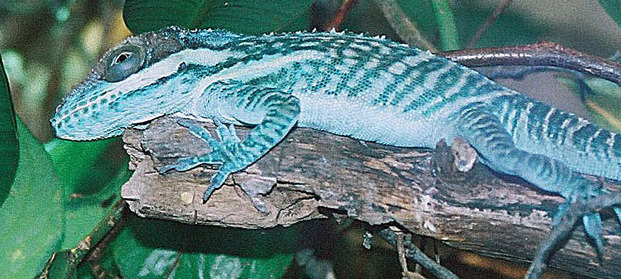
  Smallwood's anole (A. smallwoodi)
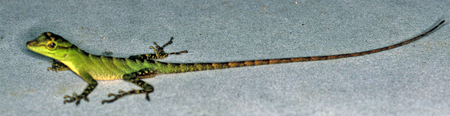
  Small-scaled anole (A. squamulatus)
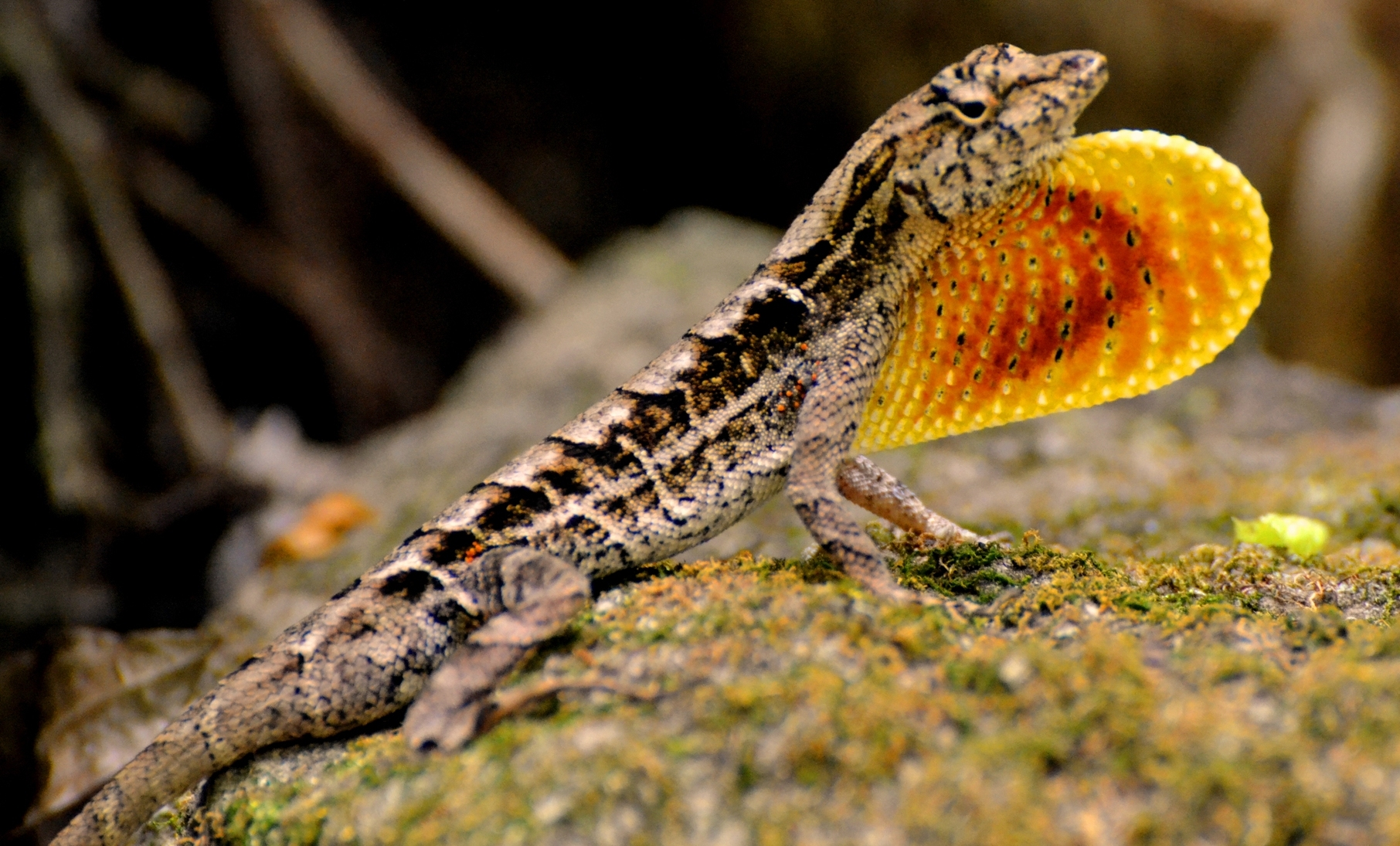
  Upland scaly anole (A. spilorhipis)
  Anolis sericeus Hallowell, 1856 – silky anole
- Anolis serranoi (G. Köhler, 1999)
- Anolis sheplani Schwartz, 1974 – Baoruco gray twig anole, Cabral anole
- Anolis shrevei (Cochran, 1939) – Cordillera central stout anole, Shreve's anole
- Anolis sierramaestrae Holáňová, Rehák & Frynta, 2012 – Sierra Maestrae bearded anole
- Anolis singularis E. Williams, 1965 – Macaya green twig anole, porcupine anole
- Anolis smallwoodi Schwartz, 1964 – green-blotched giant anole, Smallwood's anole
  - Anolis smallwoodi palardis Schwartz, 1964
  - Anolis smallwoodi saxuliceps Schwartz, 1964
  - Anolis smallwoodi smallwoodi Schwartz, 1964
- Anolis smaragdinus Barbour & Shreve, 1935 – Bahamian green anole
  - Anolis smaragdinus lerneri Oliver, 1948
  - Anolis smaragdinus smaragdinus Barbour & Shreve, 1935
- Anolis sminthus Dunn & Emlen, 1932 – mouse anole
- Anolis soinii Poe & Yañez-Miranda, 2008
- Anolis solitarius Ruthven, 1916 – solitaire anole
- Anolis spectrum Peters, 1863 – black-shouldered ground anole, Matanzas anole, ghost anole
- Anolis spilorhipis (Alvarez Del Toro & Smith, 1956)
- Anolis squamulatus Peters, 1863 – small-scaled anole
- Anolis stevepoei G. Köhler et al., 2014
- Anolis strahmi Schwartz, 1979 – Baoruco stout anole, Strahm's anole
  - Anolis strahmi abditus Schwartz, 1979
  - Anolis strahmi strahmi Schwartz, 1979
- Anolis stratulus Cope 1861 – banded anole, spotted anole, or St. Thomas anole
- Anolis subocularis Davis, 1954 Pacific anole
- Anolis sulcifrons Cope, 1899 – grooved anole

== T ==
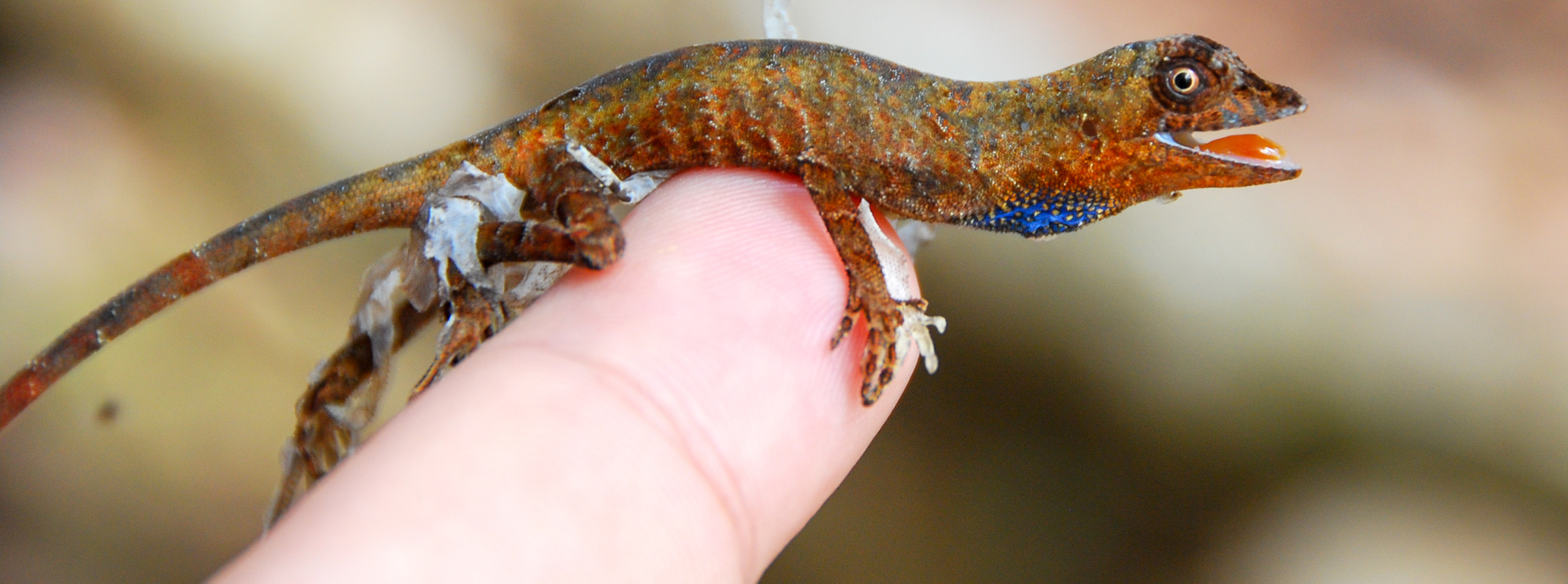
Tanda's anole (A. tandai)

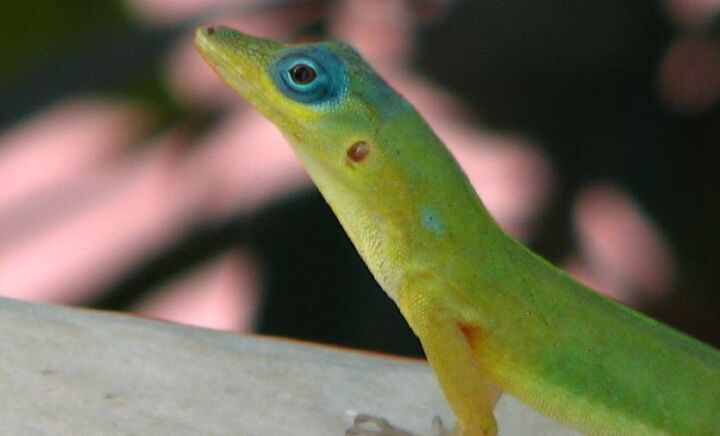
- Trinidad anole (A. trinitatis)
  Anolis tandai Avila-Pires, 1995 – Tanda's anole
- Anolis taylori (H.M. Smith & Spieler, 1945) – Taylor's anole
- Anolis tenorioensis (G. Köhler, 2011)
- Anolis tequendama Moreno-Arias, Méndez-Galeano, Beltrán, & Vargas-Ramírez, 2023 – Tequendama anole
- Anolis terraealtae (Barbour 1915) – Les Saines anole, Les Saintes anole
- Anolis terueli Navarro, Fernandez & Garrido, 2001 – yellow-fanned pallid anole
- Anolis tetarii (Barros, Williams, & Viloria, 1996)
- Anolis tigrinus (Peters, 1863) – tiger anole
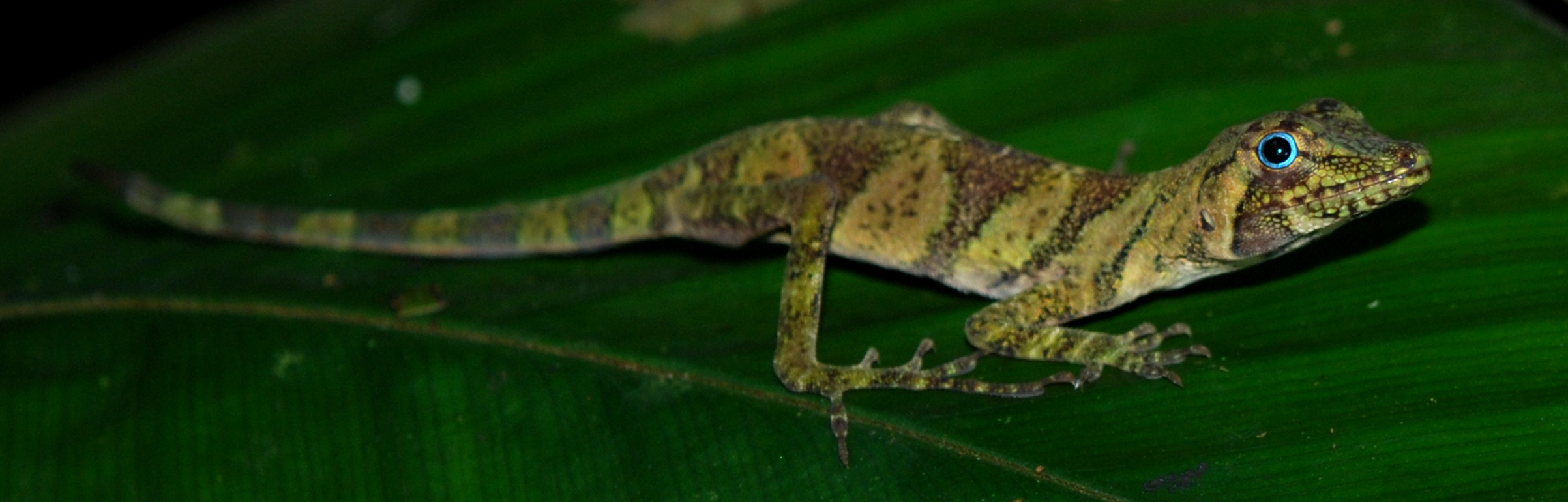
- Banded tree anole (A. transversalis)
  Anolis toldo Fong & Garrido, 2000 – gray-banded green anole
- Anolis tolimensis (Werner, 1916)
- Anolis torresfundorai (Torresfundora, 2025) - Torresfundora's Anole, West Cuban Green Anole
- Anolis townsendi (Stejneger, 1900) – Townsend's anole, Cocos Island anole
- Anolis trachyderma (Cope, 1876) – common forest anole, roughskin anole
- Anolis transversalis (Duméril, 1851) – banded tree anole, transverse anole
- Anolis trinitatis (Reinhardt & Lütken, 1862) – St. Vincent Bush anole, Saint Vincent's bush anole, Trinidad anole
- Anolis triumphalis (Nicholson & Kohler, 2014)
- Anolis tropidogaster (Hallowell, 1856) – tropical anole
- Anolis tropidolepis (Boulenger, 1885) – swift anole
- Anolis tropidonotus (Peters, 1863) – greater scaly anole

== U ==
- Anolis uniformis (Cope, 1885) – lesser scaly anole
- Anolis unilobatus (Köhler & Vesely, 2010) – blue-spotted fan anole
- Anolis urraoi Grisales-Martínez et al. (2017) – Urrao anole
- Anolis ustus Cope, 1864
- Anolis utilensis (Köhler, 1996) – Utila anole, mangrove anole

== V ==
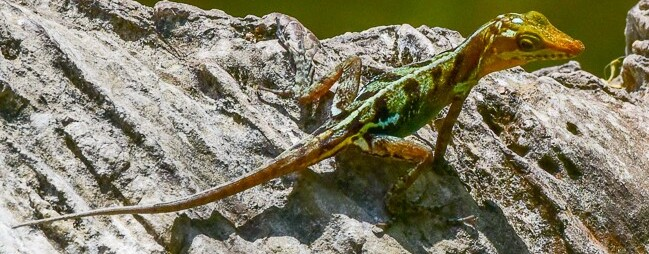
Cuban stream anole (A. vermiculatus)

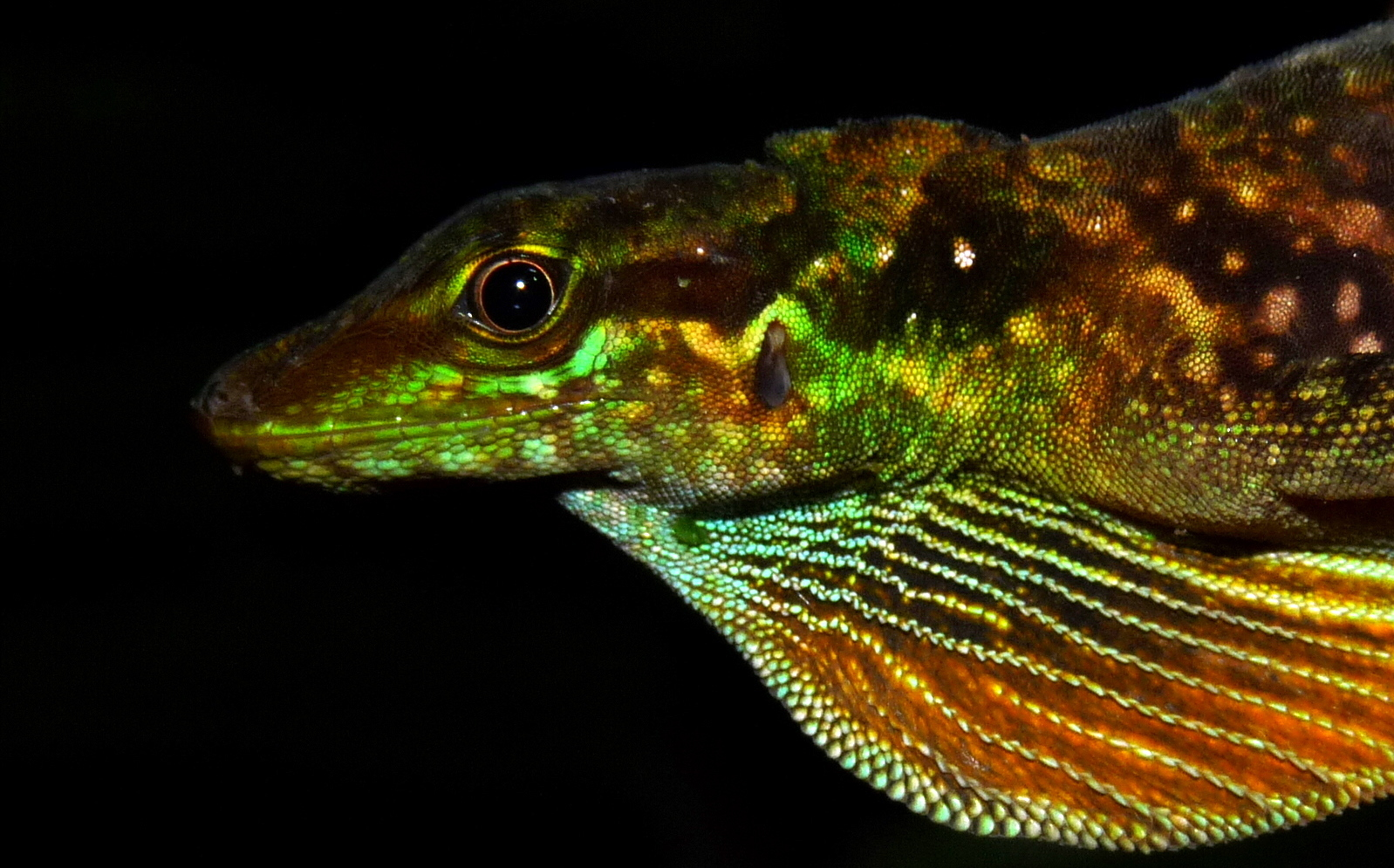
Speckled anole (A. ventrimaculatus)

- Anolis valencienni (Duméril & Bibron, 1837) – Jamaican twig anole, short-tail anole
- Anolis vanidicus Garrido & Schwartz, 1972 – Escambray grass anole, Vanidicus anole
- Anolis vanzolinii (Williams, Orces, Matheus, & Bleiweiss, 1996)
- Anolis vaupesianus (Williams, 1982) – Williams's anole
- Anolis ventrimaculatus (Boulenger, 1911) – speckled anole
- Anolis vermiculatus Cocteau, 1837 – Cuban stream anole, Vinales anole
- Anolis vescus Garrido & Hedges – Sierra Del Purial bush anole, Purial bush anole
- Anolis vicarius (Williams, 1986)
- Anolis villai (Fitch & Henderson, 1976) – Great Corn Island anole, country anole
- Anolis vinosus Schwartz, 1968
- Anolis viridulus Díaz, Cádiz, Velazco, & Kawata, 2022
- Anolis viridius Kohler & Hedges, 2016 – Barahona green anole
- Anolis vittigerus Cope, 1862 – garland anole

== W ==
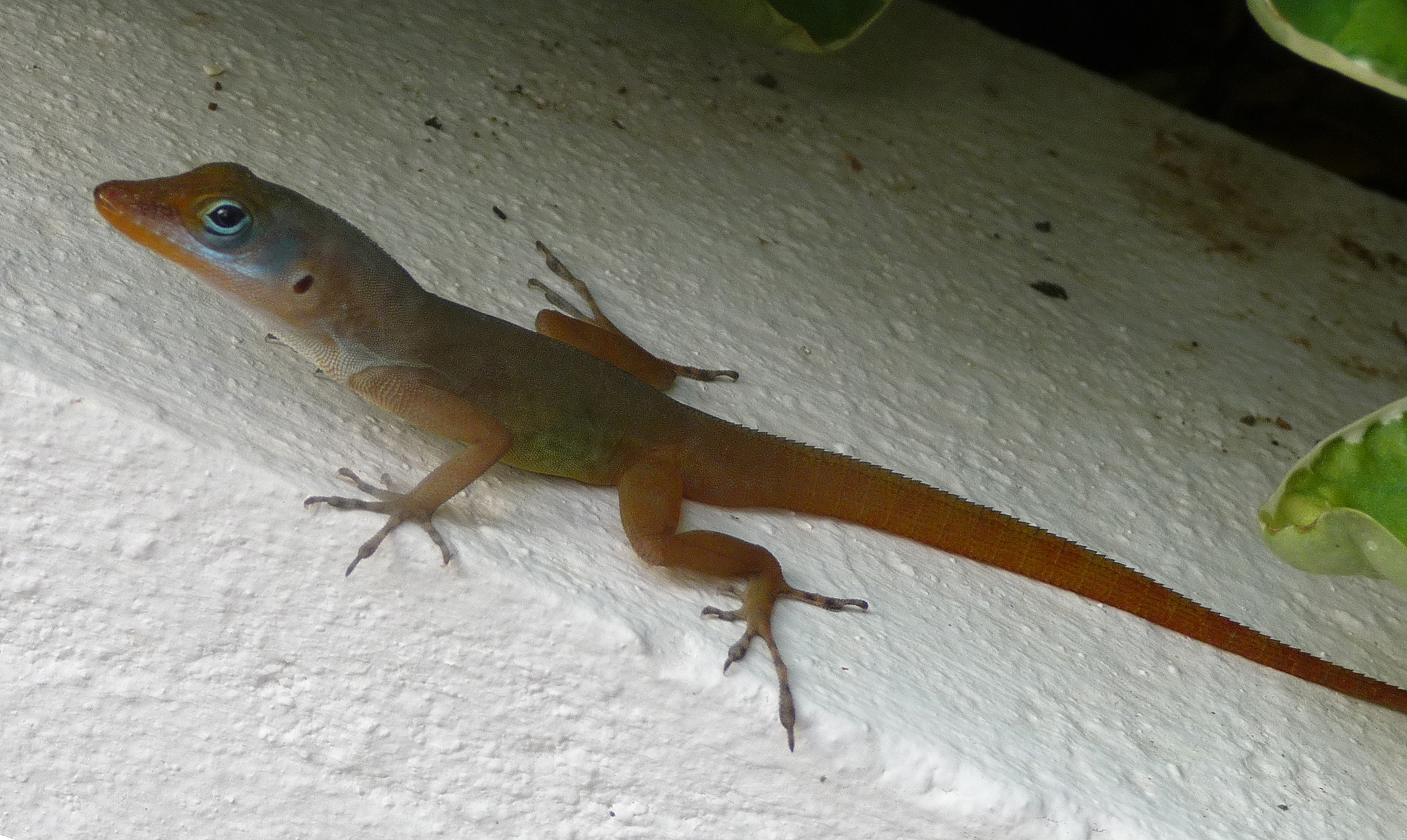
- Watt's anole (A. wattsii)
  Anolis wampuensis (McCranie & Köhler, 2001)
- Anolis wattsii (Boulenger, 1911) – Watts's anole
- Anolis websteri (Arnold, 1980) – yellow-bellied desert anole, Webster's anole
- Anolis wellbornae (Ahl, 1940)
- Anolis wermuthi (Köhler & Obermeier, 1998) – Wermuth's anole
- Anolis williamsmittermeierorum Poe & Yañez-Miranda, 2007 – Williams-Mittermeier anole
- Anolis wilsoni (Kohler, Townsend, & Petersen, 2016)
- Anolis woodi (Dunn, 1940) – Wood's anole

== Y ==
- Anolis yoroensis (McCranie, Nicholson, & Köhler, 2001)

== Z ==
- Anolis zapotecorum Köhler et al., 2014
- Anolis zeus (Köhler & McCranie, 2001)
