= List of reptiles of El Salvador =

The reptiles that inhabit El Salvador include snakes, lizards, crocodilians and turtles. El Salvador has a herpetofauna that includes 141 species of reptiles, which are grouped into 3 orders and 26 families.

Table of contents

Turtles: Cheloniidae · Dermochelyidae · Emydidae · Geoemydidae · Kinosternidae · Staurotypidae

Crocodilians: Crocodylidae · Alligatoridae

Lizards: Anguidae · Corytophanidae · Dactyloidae · Gekkonidae · Iguanidae · Phrynosomatidae · Scincidae · Teiidae · Gymnophthalmidae · Xantusiidae

Snakes: Leptotyphlopidae · Typhlopidae · Boidae · Loxocemidae · Colubridae · Dipsadidae · Natricidae · Elapidae · Viperidae

Notes References

== Turtles (Testudines) ==
=== Cheloniidae ===
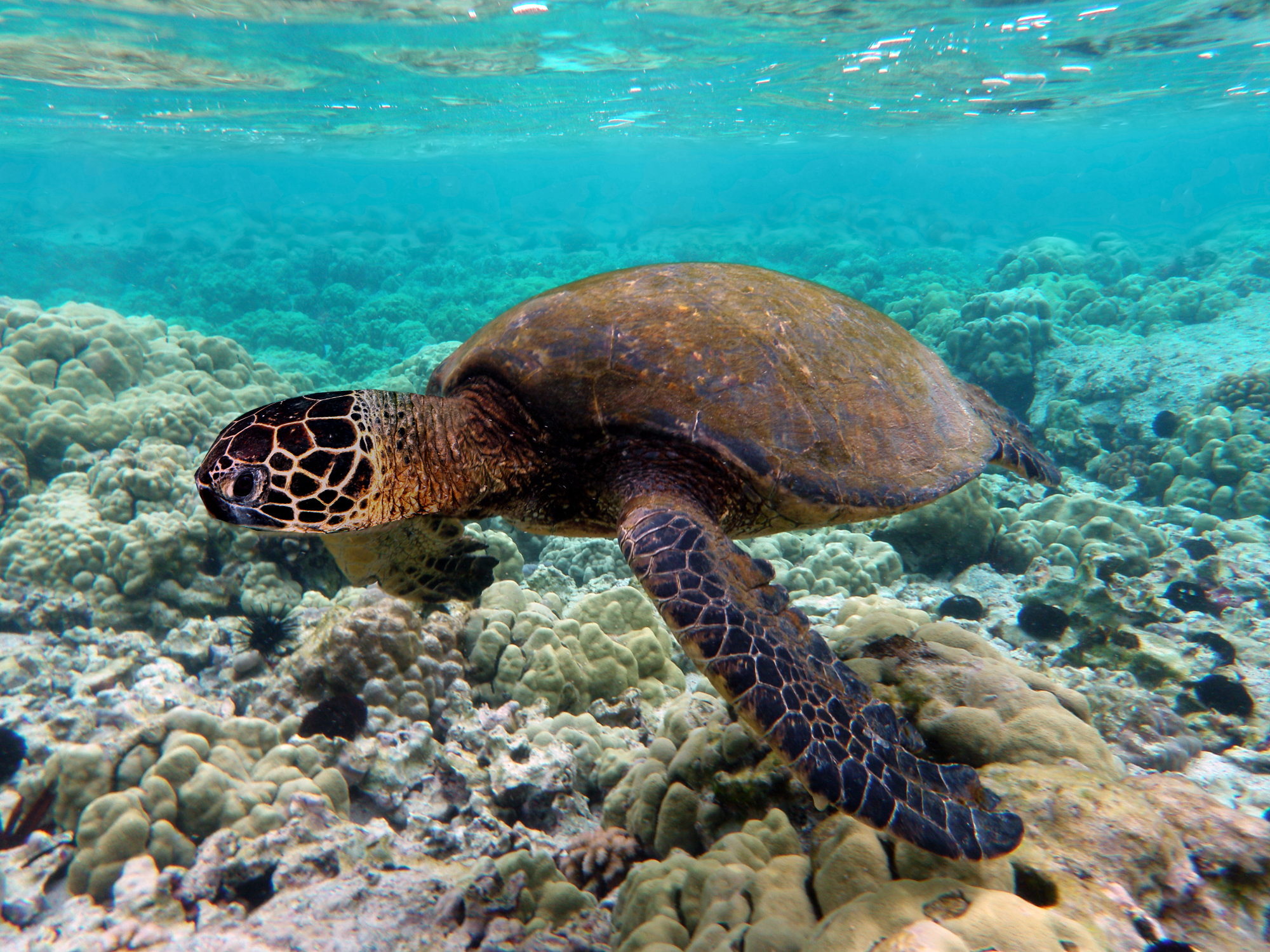
Chelonia mydas

Order: Testudines · Family: Cheloniidae

Sea turtles (Cheloniidae) are a family of large turtles found in all tropical seas and some subtropical and temperate seas. Sea turtles developed from land turtles about 120 million years ago and are well adapted to life in the sea. They feed mainly on jellyfish, crustaceans and squid. There are 5 or 6 species worldwide, of which at least 5 are currently endangered.

- Caretta caretta (Linnaeus, 1758) [EN]
- Chelonia agassizii Bocourt, 1868 [EN]
- Chelonia mydas (Linnaeus, 1758) [EN]
- Eretmochelys imbricata (Linnaeus, 1766) [CR]
- Lepidochelys olivacea (Eschscholtz, 1829) [VU]

=== Dermochelyidae ===
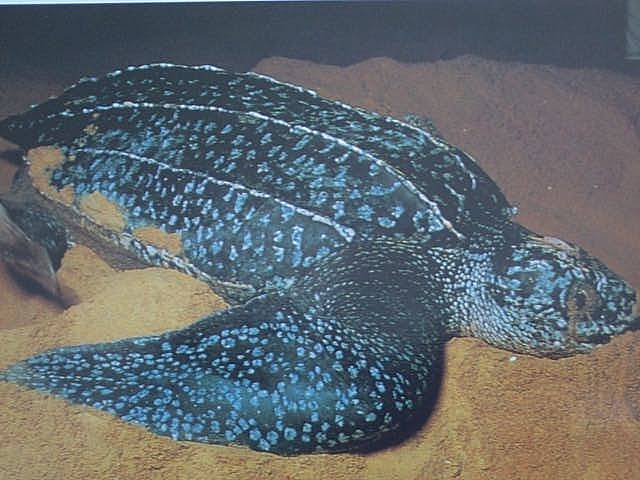
Dermochelys coriacea

Order: Testudines · Family: Dermochelyidae

The leatherback sea turtle (Dermochelys coriacea) is the largest of all living turtles, reaching a length of 2 metres (6.6 ft) and weighing more than 600 kilograms (1,300 lb). It is found in all tropical or subtropical seas. Unlike most sea turtles, leatherbacks are often found in the colder waters of temperate zones. It is the only species within the Dermochelyidae family and is critically endangered. All other species are only known as fossils.

- Dermochelys coriacea (Vandelli, 1761) [CR]

=== Emydidae ===
Order: Testudines · Family: Emydidae

The emydidae (Emydidae) are a family of carnivorous aquatic and semi-aquatic turtles. They live most of the time in ponds, reservoirs and rivers, coming to land when they have to find suitable places to lay their eggs. This family is made up of 10 genera that contain more than 50 species. four of them occur in El Salvador.

- Trachemys emolli (Legler, 1990)
- Trachemys grayi (Bocourt, 1868)
- Trachemys scripta (Thunberg in Schoepff, 1792)
- Trachemys venusta (Gray, 1855)

=== Geoemydidae ===
The geoemydidae (Geoemydidae) are a family of turtles made up of 69 species distributed throughout the world. One of them occurs in El Salvador:

- Rhinoclemmys pulcherrima (Gray, 1855)

=== Kinosternidae ===
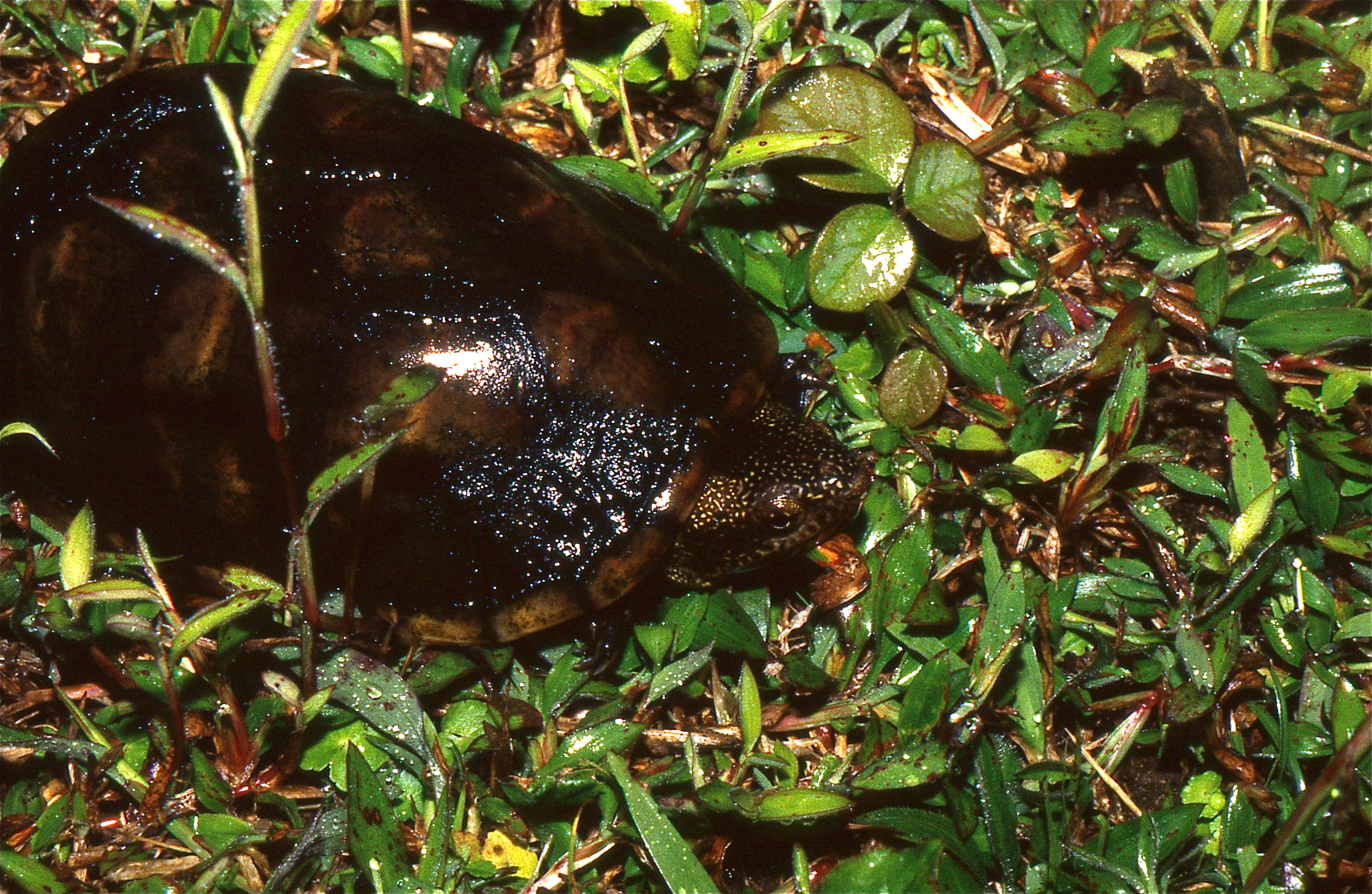
Kinosternon scorpioides

Order: Testudines · Family: Kinosternidae

Chinosternidae (Kinosternidae), or swamp turtles, are a family of turtles native to America. They are mostly small turtles that inhabit bodies of water with soft, muddy bottoms with an abundance of vegetation. All members of the family are carnivorous and feed on crustaceans, aquatic insects, mollusks, annelids, amphibians, small fish and sometimes carrion. The Kinosternidae family has a total of 4 genera and 25 species. Two species occur in El Salvador.

- Kinosternon scorpioides (Linnaeus, 1766)
- Staurotypus salvinii (Gray, 1864)

== Crocodilians (Crocodylia) ==
=== Crocodylidae ===
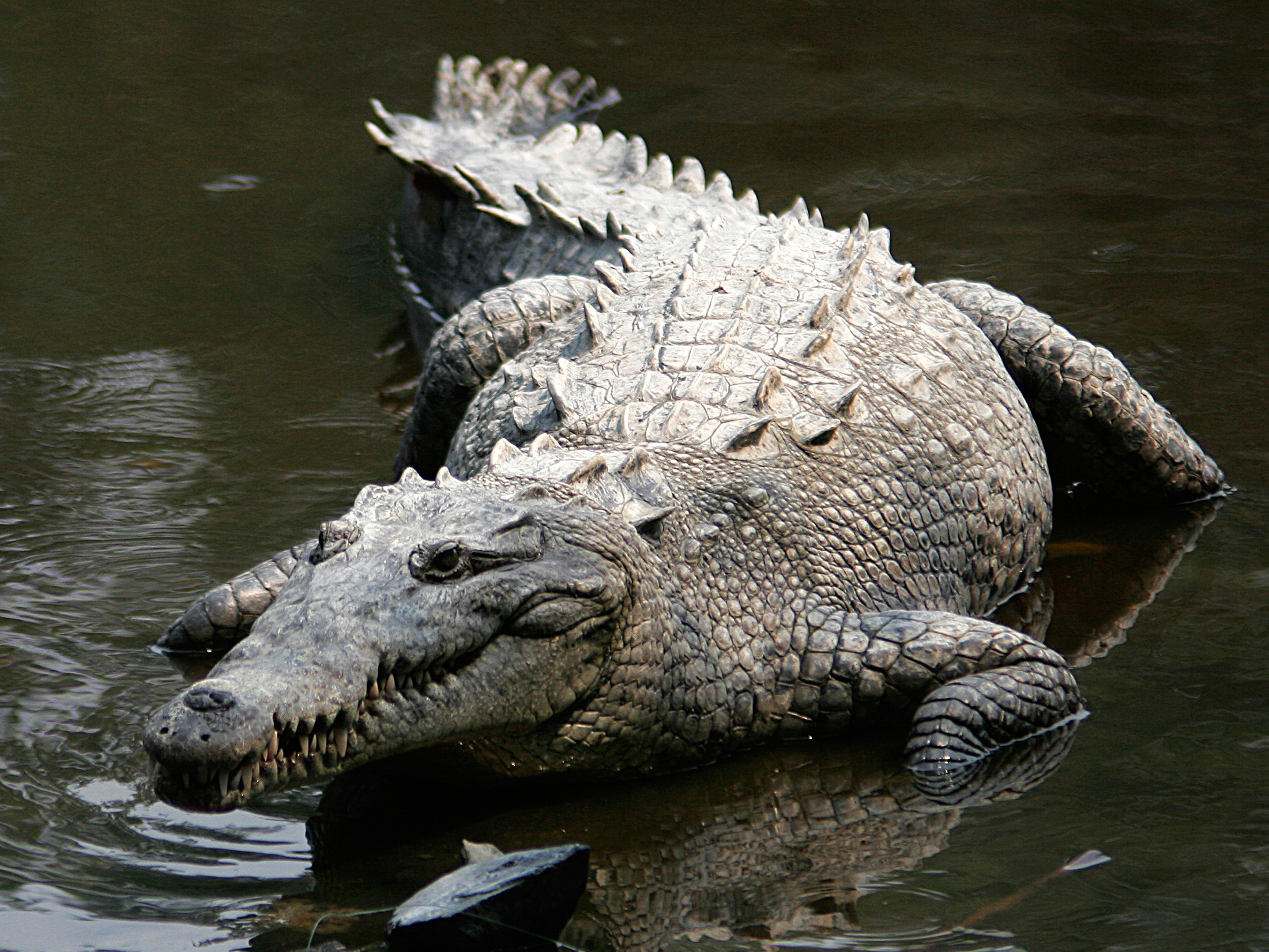
Crocodylus acutus

Order: Crocodylia · Family: Crocodylidae

Crocodilians (Crocodylidae) are a family of archosaur sauropsids (reptiles) commonly known as crocodiles. It includes 14 species of large semi-aquatic reptiles that inhabit tropical areas of the world. Crocodiles tend to congregate in freshwater habitats, such as rivers, lakes, wetlands, and sometimes brackish water. Crocodiles are ambush hunters, waiting for fish or land animals to approach, to pounce on the prey. As cold-blooded predators, they have a very slow metabolism and can therefore survive long periods without food. They feed mainly on vertebrates such as fish, reptiles and mammals, and sometimes invertebrates such as mollusks and crustaceans, depending on the species. Despite their slow appearance, crocodiles are very fast over short distances, even out of water.

- Crocodylus acutus Cuvier, 1807 [VU]

=== Alligatoridae ===
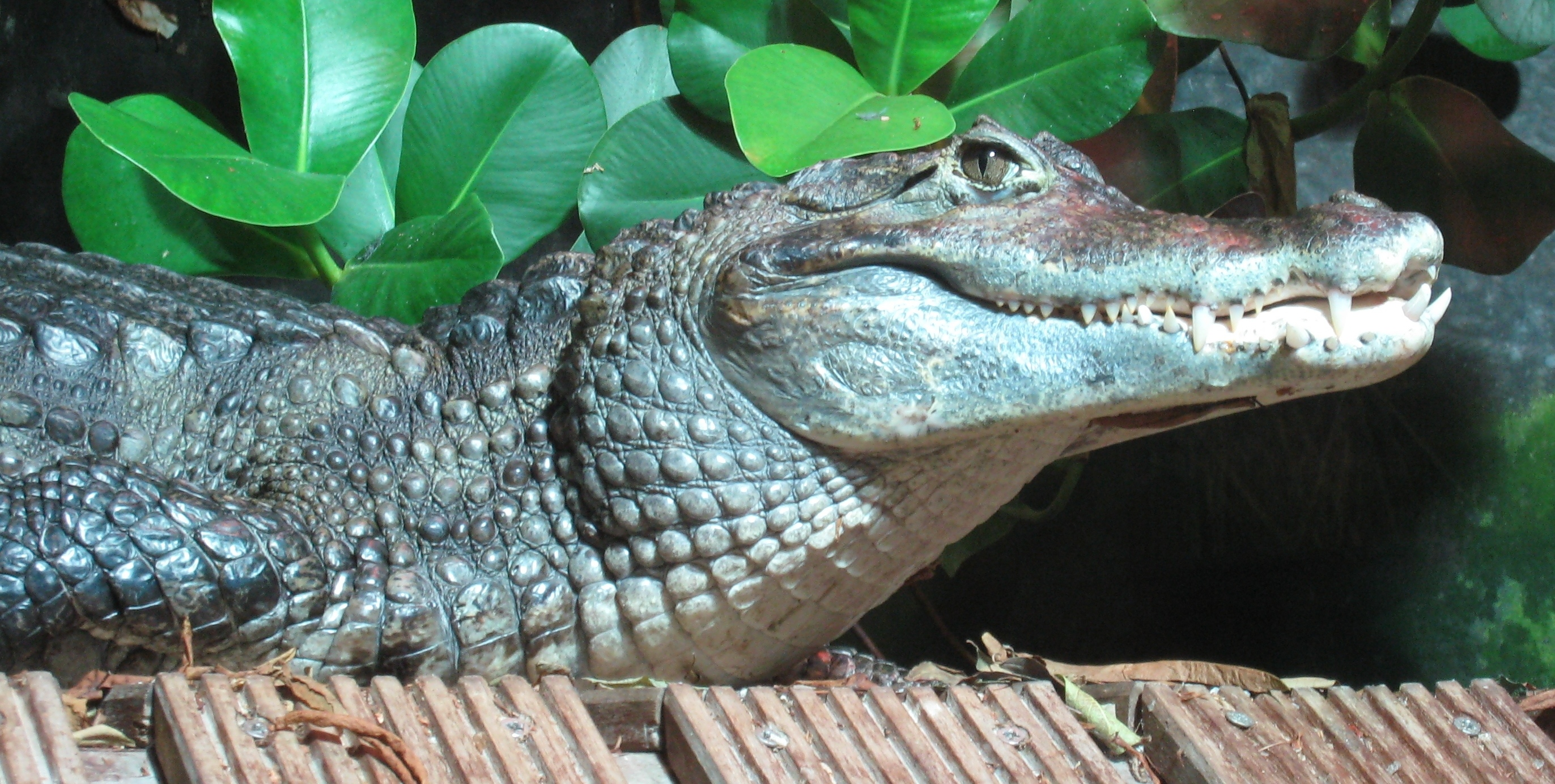
Caiman crocodilus

Order: Crocodylia · Family: Alligatoridae

The alligatoridae (Alligatoridae) are a family of crocodilian sauropsids (reptiles) native to the Americas, including alligators and caimans. It includes the extant genera Alligator, Caiman, Melanosuchus and Paleosuchus, as well as numerous extinct genera. Of the 7 species that inhabit America, one occurs in El Salvador.

- Caiman crocodilus Linnaeus, 1758

== Lizards (Squamata – suborder Lacertilia) ==
=== Anguidae ===
Order: Squamata · Family: Anguidae

The anguids (Aguidae), popularly known as glass lizards, are a family of lacertilian reptiles characterized by atrophy of the legs, although they are not directly related to snakes; This is, therefore, a notable case of evolutionary convergence. The distribution of Anguidae spans the old and new world. It is absent only in Australia. Most species are terrestrial and live in the leaf litter on the forest floor. The anguid family is divided into three subfamilies, eight genera and contains 94 species, of which 5 occur in El Salvador.

- Abronia montecristoi Hidalgo, 1983
- Abronia salvadorensis Hidalgo, 1983
- Celestus bivittatus (Boulenger, 1895)
- Diploglossus atitlanensis (Smith, 1950)
- Mesaspis moreletii (Bocourt, 1872)

=== Corytophanidae ===
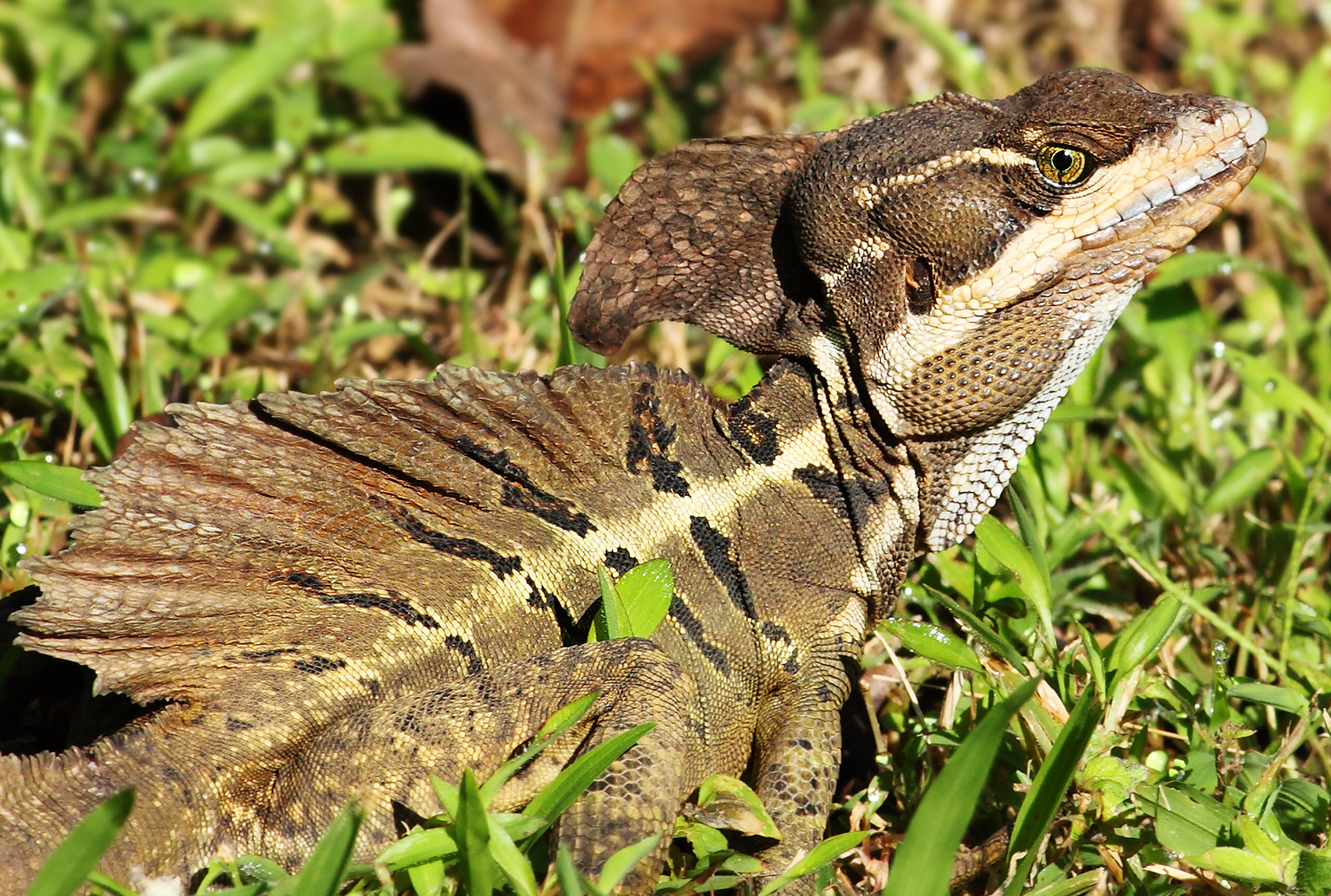
Basiliscus vittatus

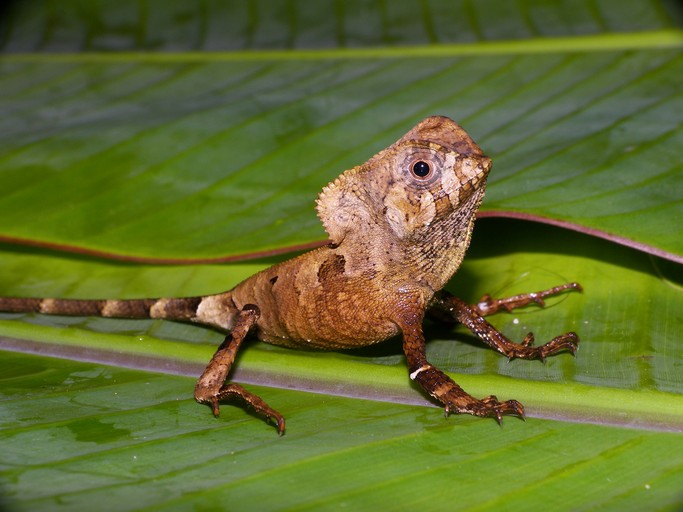
Corytophanes cristatus

Order: Squamata · Family: Corytophanidae

The corytophanids (Corytophanidae) are a family of scaly reptiles from the suborder of lizards. They typically present helmet-shaped front crests, which are sexually dimorphic characters in species of the genus Basiliscus, since only males develop them, while in the species of Corytophanes and Laemanctus they are present in both males and females. Its distribution area includes Mexico, Central and South America up to Ecuador. There are 9 known species of corythophanids, 3 of them occur in El Salvador.

- Basiliscus vittatus Wiegmann, 1828
- Corytophanes cristatus (Merrem, 1820)
- Corytophanes percarinatus Duméril, 1856

=== Dactyloidae ===
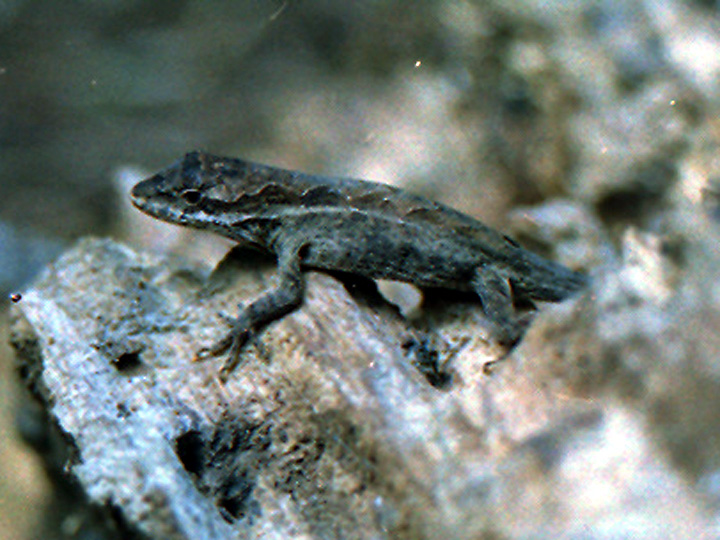
Anolis crassulus

Order: Squamata · Family: Dactyloidae

- Anolis biporcatus (Wiegmann, 1834)
- Anolis capito Peters, 1863
- Anolis crassulus Cope, 1864
- Anolis laeviventris (Wiegmann, 1834)
- Anolis lemurinus Cope, 1861
- Anolis limifrons Cope, 1862
- Anolis macrophallus Werner, 1917
- Anolis serranoi (Köhler, 1999)
- Anolis sminthus Dunn & Emlen, 1932
- Anolis tropidonotus Peters, 1863
- Anolis wellbornae Ahl, 1940

=== Gekkonidae ===
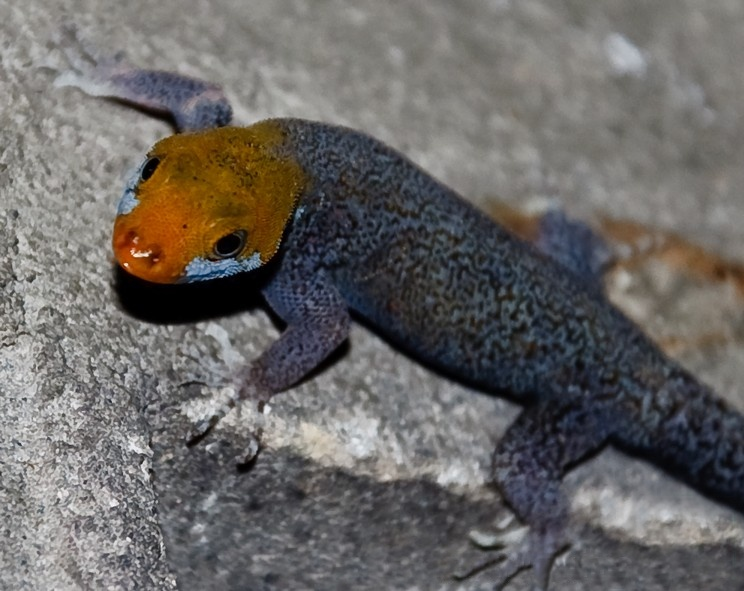
Gonatodes albogularis

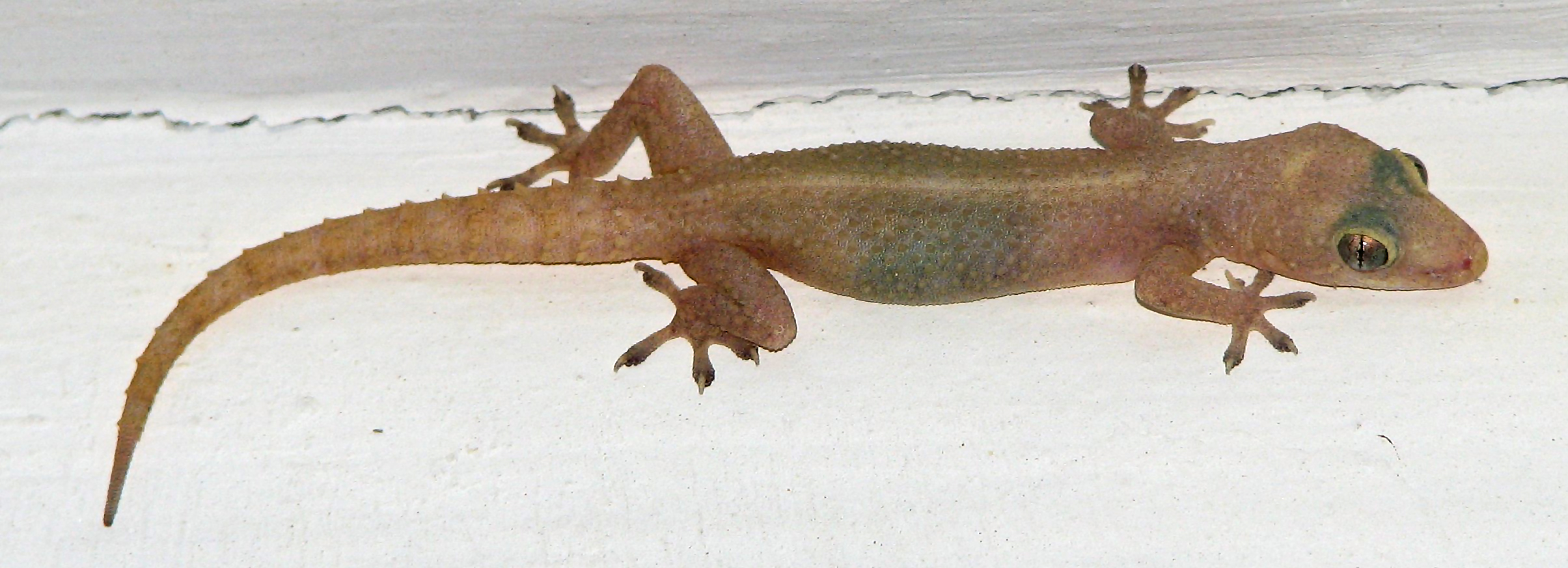
Hemidactylus frenatus

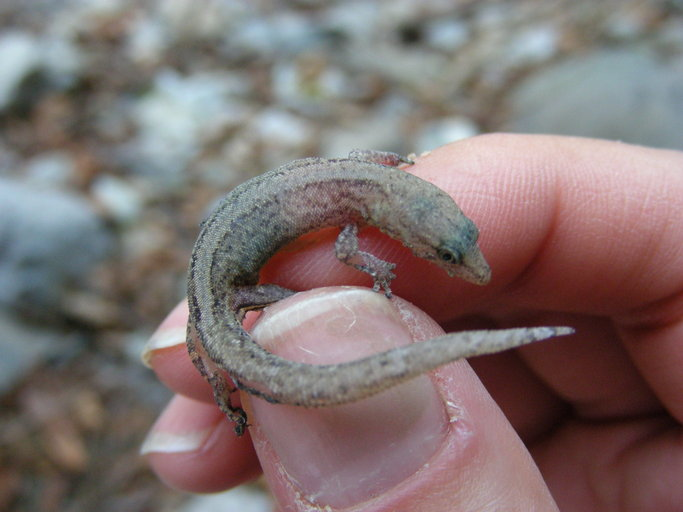
Sphaerodactylus glaucus

Order: Squamata · Family: Gekkonidae

Geconids or geckos (Gekkonidae) are a family of scaly sauropsids (reptiles), which includes small to medium-sized species found in temperate and tropical climates around the world. They have several peculiar features that clearly distinguish them from other lizards. They are unique in their vocalization, as they make screeching noises in their interactions with other geckos. They are nocturnal, with large eyes and equipped with vertical lobed pupils that allow an extraordinary margin of variation in their opening. Many species have sticky pads on the soles of their feet and can climb smooth vertical surfaces and even navigate ceilings. The geconids form a large family of lizards with a total of approximately 1500 species. 6 species occur in El Salvador.

- Coleonyx elegans Gray, 1845
- Coleonyx mitratus (Peters, 1863)
- Gonatodes albogularis (Duméril & Bibron, 1836)
- Hemidactylus frenatus Schlegel, 1836
- Phyllodactylus tuberculosus Wiegmann, 1834
- Sphaerodactylus glaucus Cope, 1866

=== Iguanidae ===
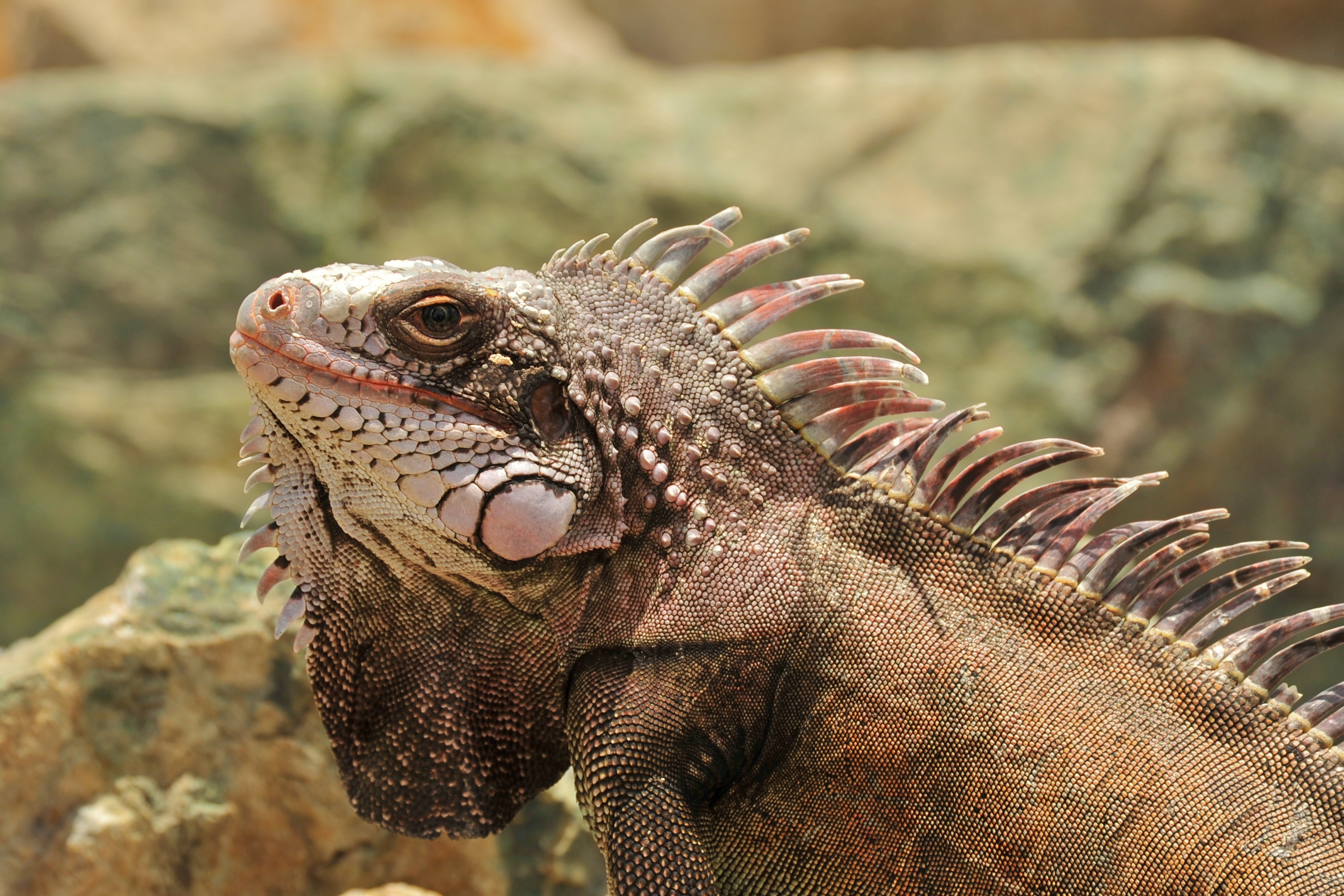
Iguana iguana

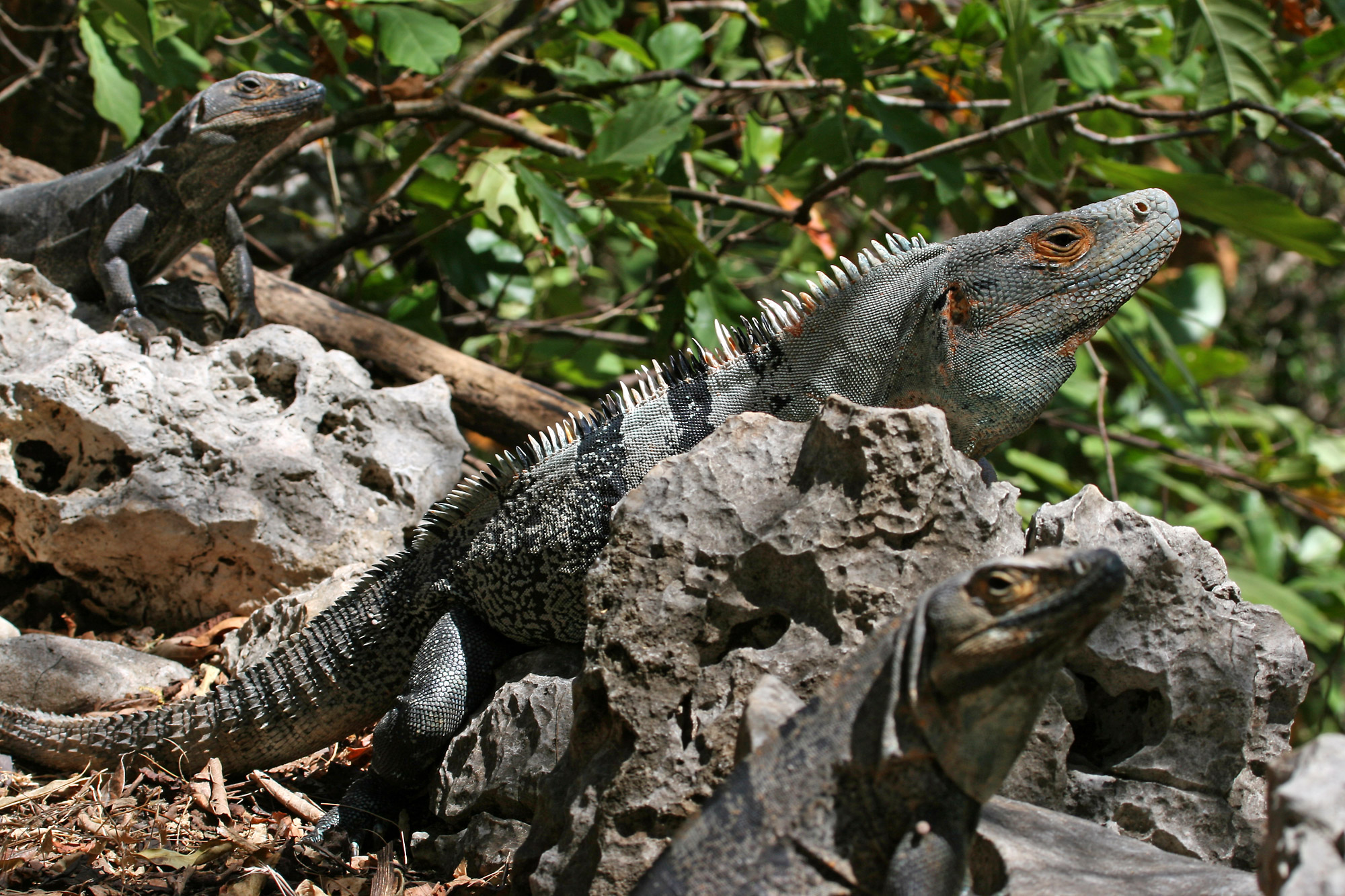
Ctenosaura similis

Order: Squamata · Family: Iguanidae

The iguanids (Iguanidae) are a family of lizards whose distribution extends from the southern United States, Central America to Paraguay, and from the Caribbean islands to the Galapagos Islands and Fiji. Iguanids can reach lengths that vary between 14 centimetres (5.5 in) and 200 centimetres (79 in). The tail is often longer than the rest of the body. They often have a dewlap that helps regulate body temperature, and dorsal spines that are more pronounced in males than in females. Some species are terrestrial, others prefer to live in trees or rocks. Males are usually territorial and defend their territory against other males, but tolerate females. All iguanas are oviparous. The nests are usually quite large, often several females lay their eggs in the proximity of other nests to facilitate their defense. Juveniles feed primarily on insects and other invertebrates, while adults, especially in larger species, switch to a primarily plant diet. Four iguanids occur in El Salvador.

- Ctenosaura flavidorsalis Köhler & Klemmer, 1994 [EN]
- Ctenosaura quinquecarinata (Gray, 1842)
- Ctenosaura similis (Gray, 1831)
- Iguana iguana (Linnaeus, 1758)

=== Phrynosomatidae ===
Order: Squamata · Family: Phrynosomatidae

Phrynosomatidae (Phrynosomatidae) are a family of lizards known as spiny lizards. They have a parietal eye. They live among rocks, on the ground, in bushy vegetation, under logs or under rocks. Its range includes southern Canada, the United States, Mexico and Central America. There are 136 recognized species, 4 of them occur in El Salvador.

- Sceloporus acanthinus Bocourt, 1873
- Sceloporus malachiticus Cope, 1864
- Sceloporus squamosus Bocourt, 1874
- Sceloporus variabilis Wiegmann, 1834

=== Scincidae ===
Order: Squamata · Family: Scincidae

The scincids (Scincidae) are a family of scaly sauropsids (reptiles); It is the most diverse group of lizards. Includes skinks or skinks. It belongs to the superfamily or infraorder Scincomorpha, which also includes the true lizards (Lacertidae). The Scincidae family contains about 1,200 species of lizards that have a global distribution. 3 species occur in El Salvador.

- Mesoscincus managuae (Dunn, 1933)
- Scincella assata (Cope, 1864)
- Scincella cherriei (Cope, 1893)

=== Teiidae ===
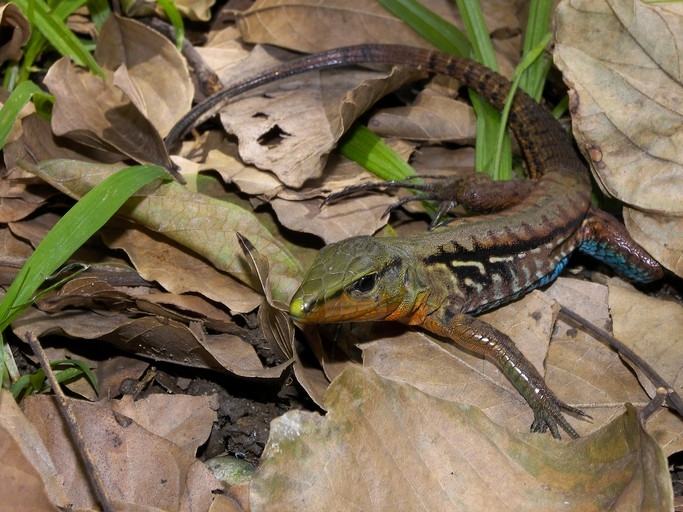
Holcosus festivus

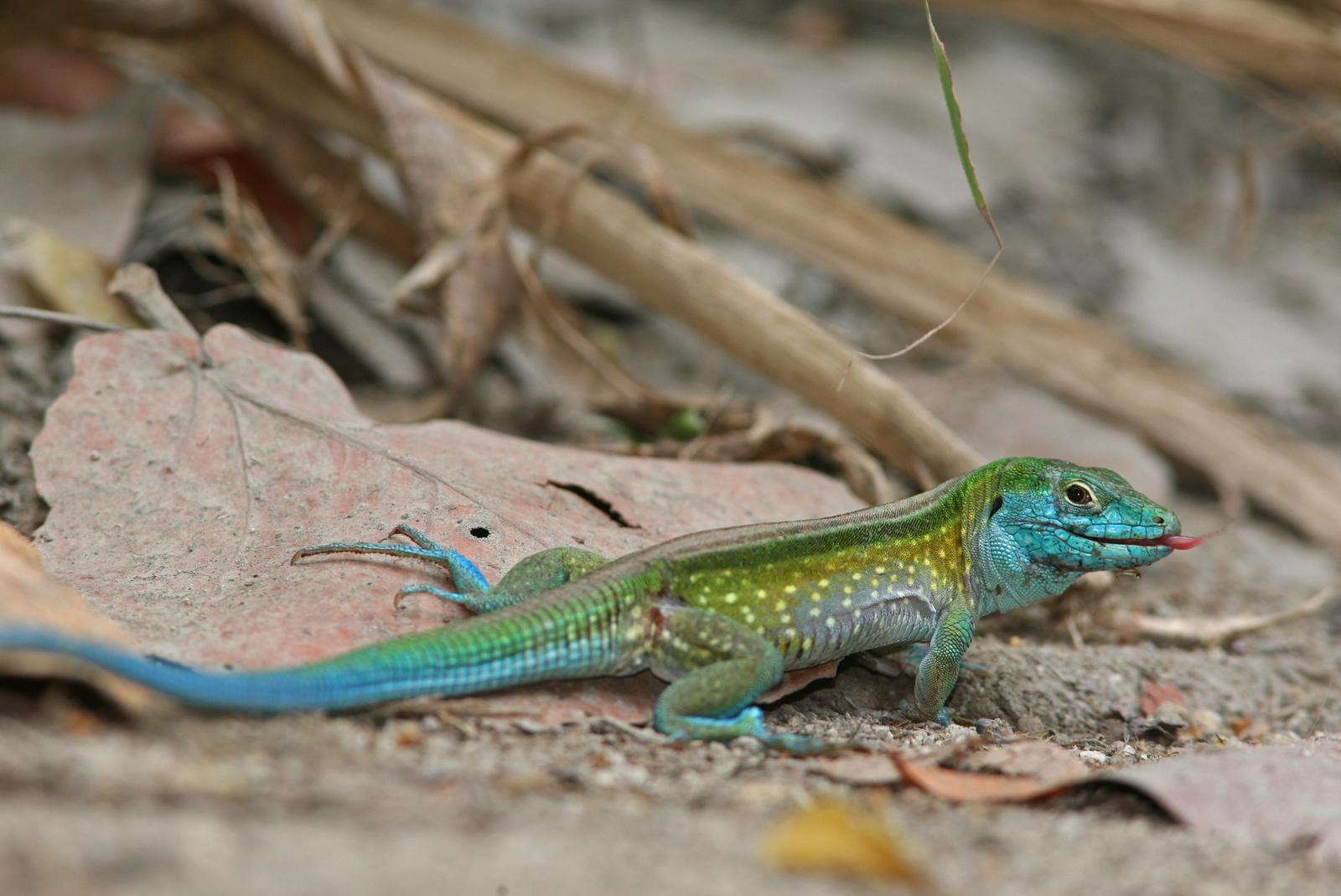
Holcosus undulatus

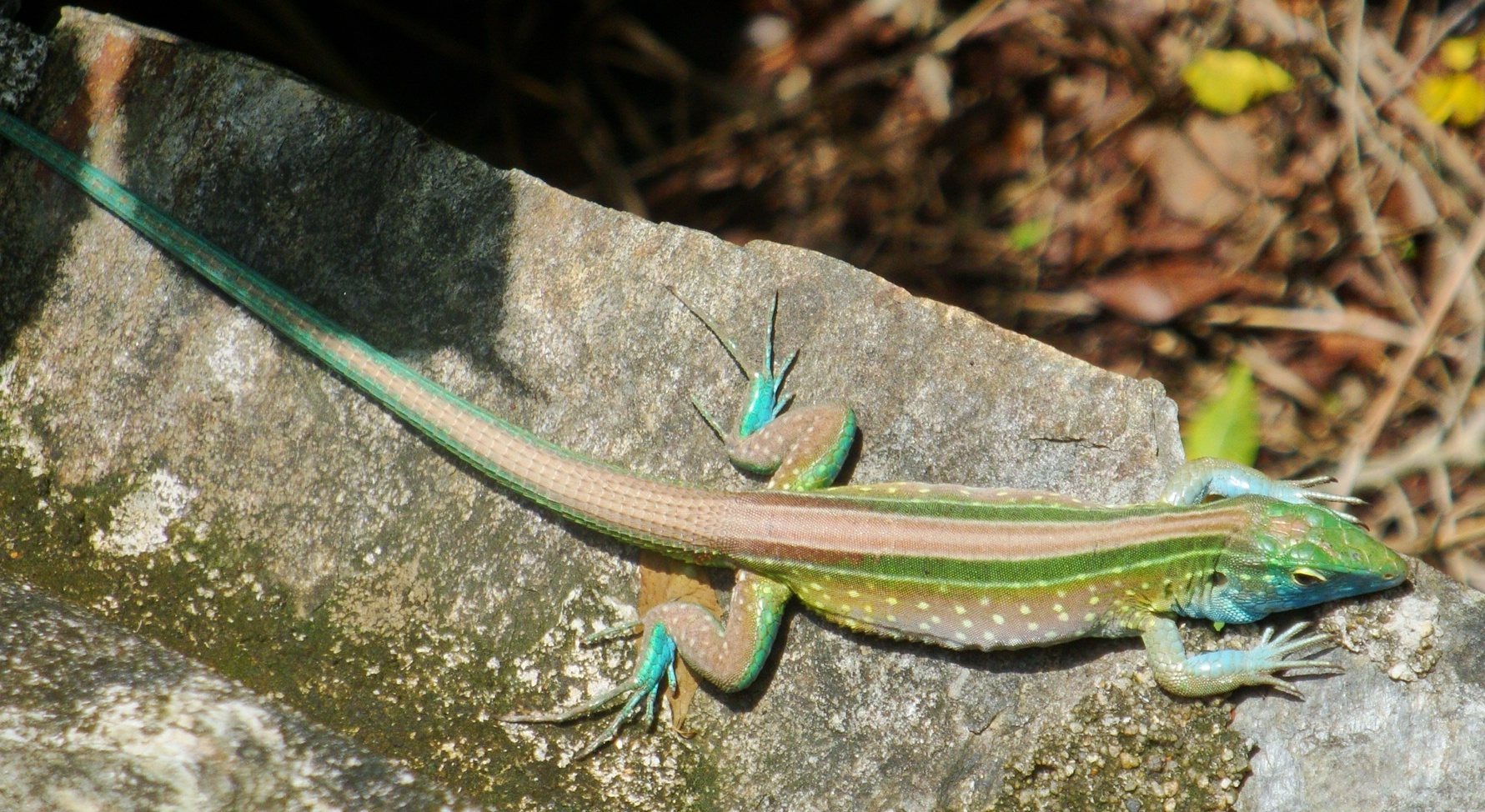
Cnemidophorus lemniscatus

Order: Squamata · Family: Teiidae

The teiids (Teiidae) are a family of lizards with elongated bodies, well-developed limbs, provided with granular dorsal scales, and large, rectangular ventral plates; the head has large plates. All teiids have a forked tongue, similar to that of a snake. They are terrestrial and diurnal, and mainly insectivorous, although some species include a small amount of plant matter in their diet. They all lay eggs. Ten genera are distinguished with more than 230 species, of which 6 occur in El Salvador.

- Aspidoscelis deppei (Wiegmann, 1834)
- Aspidoscelis motaguae (Sackett, 1941)
- Aspidoscelis sackii (Wiegmann, 1834)
- Cnemidophorus lemniscatus (Linnaeus, 1758)
- Holcosus festivus (Lichtenstein, 1856)
- Holcosus undulatus (Wiegmann, 1834)

=== Gymnophthalmidae ===
Order: Squamata · Family: Gymnophthalmidae

Gymnophthalmidae is a family of lizards, also known as microtheids. They have transparent lower eyelids, allowing you to see with your eyes closed. They are related to the tiiids, but with their smooth scales they are more similar to scincids. They are generally small lizards, many species have reduced limbs. They live in a wide variety of habitats – from desert to mountains to rainforest – throughout Central and South America. They generally inhabit the forest floor or humid areas associated with tropical forests. They are nocturnal animals or are active intermittently during the day. They feed mainly on insects and other invertebrates. All species are oviparous. The family is made up of more than 220 species grouped into 40 genera. A species occurs in El Salvador.

- Gymnophthalmus speciosus (Hallowell, 1871)

=== Xantusiidae ===
Order: Squamata · Family: Xantusiidae

- Lepidophyma flavimaculatum A. Duméril, 1851
- Lepidophyma smithii Bocourt, 1876

== Snakes (Squamata – suborder Serpentes) ==
=== Leptotyphlopidae ===
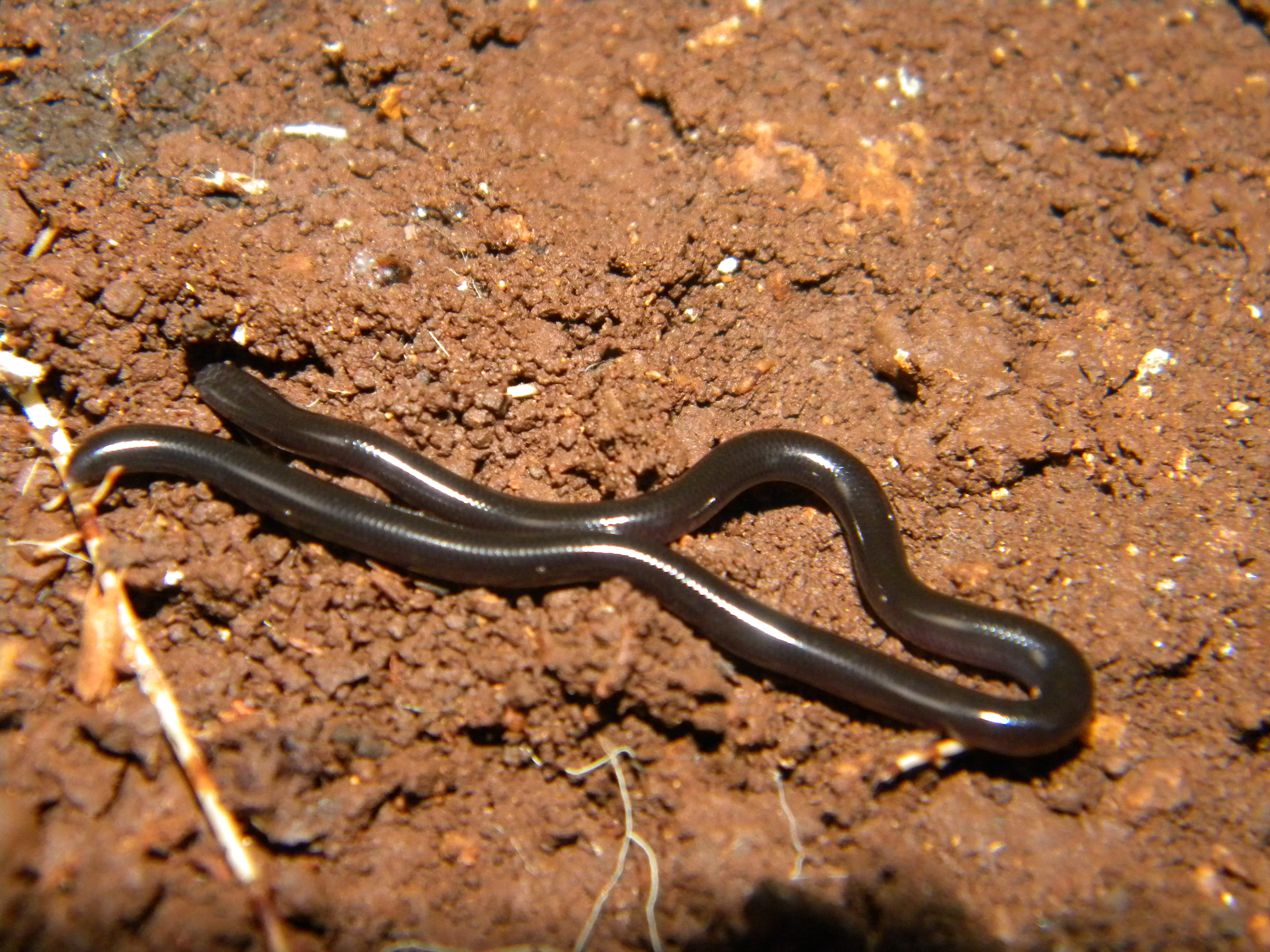
Epictia goudotii

Order: Squamata · Family: Leptotyphlopidae

Leptotyphlopidae (Leptotyphlopidae) are a family of snakes native to America, Africa and Asia. They are burrowing snakes, adapted to living in burrows, which feed on ants and termites. They are relatively small snakes that rarely exceed 30 centimetres (12 in) in length. The body is cylindrical, with polished scales, a blunt head and a short tail. They feed mainly on termites or ants, as well as their larvae and pupae. The pheromones they produce protect them from termite attacks. There are 2 genera that comprise 87 species, two of them occur in El Salvador.

- Epictia goudotii (Duméril & Bibron, 1844)
- Epictia magnamaculata (Taylor, 1940)

=== Typhlopidae ===
Order: Squamata · Family: Typhlopidae

Typhlopidae (Typhlopidae) are a family of blind snakes that mainly inhabit the tropical regions of Africa, Asia, America, and Australia. They live in burrows, and since they have no use for vision, their eyes are reduced to vestiges, although they can detect light. It has teeth in the upper jaw. The tail ends with a horn-shaped scale. Most of these species are oviparous. Currently there are 6 genera with 203 species. One species occurs in El Salvador.

- Typhlops oxyrhinus Domínguez & Diaz, 2011

=== Boidae ===
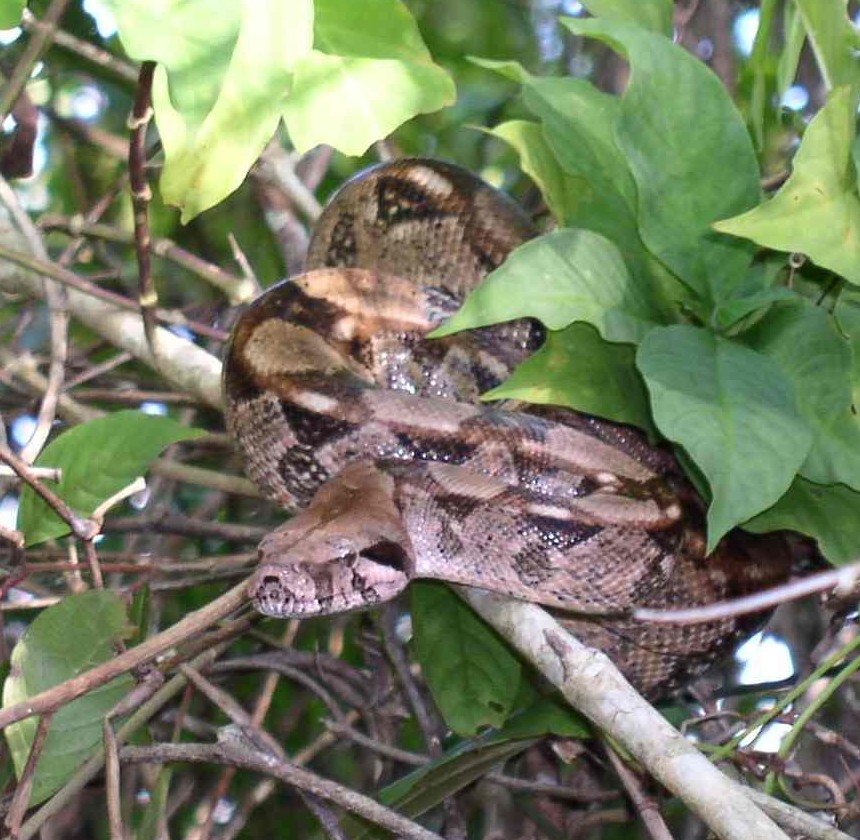
Boa constrictor

Order: Squamata · Family: Boidae

Boids or boas (Boidae) are a family of non-venomous snakes, native to the Americas, Africa, Europe, Asia and some Pacific islands. They are constrictor snakes, meaning they kill their prey by constriction, enclosing them in their rings and by applying and maintaining enough pressure to inhibit inhalation; The prey finally succumbs to suffocation. 43 species are distinguished, grouped into two subfamilies and eight genera. A species occurs in El Salvador.

- Boa constrictor Linnaeus, 1758

=== Loxocemidae ===
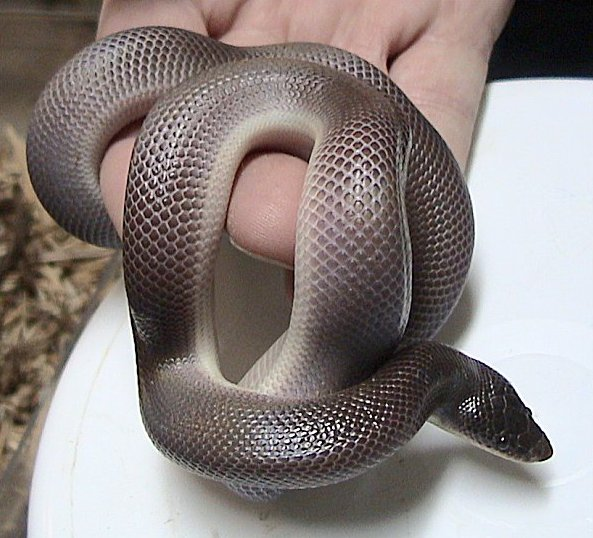
Loxocemus bicolor

Order: Squamata · Family: Loxocemidae

The loxocemids (Loxocemidae) are a family of constrictor snakes. The monotypic family Loxocemidae has a single genus (Loxocemus) and a single species Loxocemus bicolor. It can reach a length of 157 centimetres (62 in), but usually measures 77 to 100 centimetres (30 to 39 in). It has a triangular head, a fairly robust cylindrical body, a little flattened dorsoventrally in the posterior region; short and conical tail. The eyes are small; the scales are wide and smooth, all similar except for a slightly elongated ventral row. They have vestiges of a pelvic girdle and a claw-shaped structure like in boids. They are excavators, but not as specialized. They are only found in very particular areas of the tropical jungles of Mexico and Central America.

- Loxocemus bicolor Cope, 1861

=== Colubridae ===
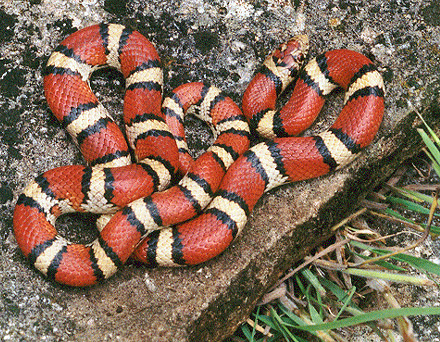
Lampropeltis triangulum

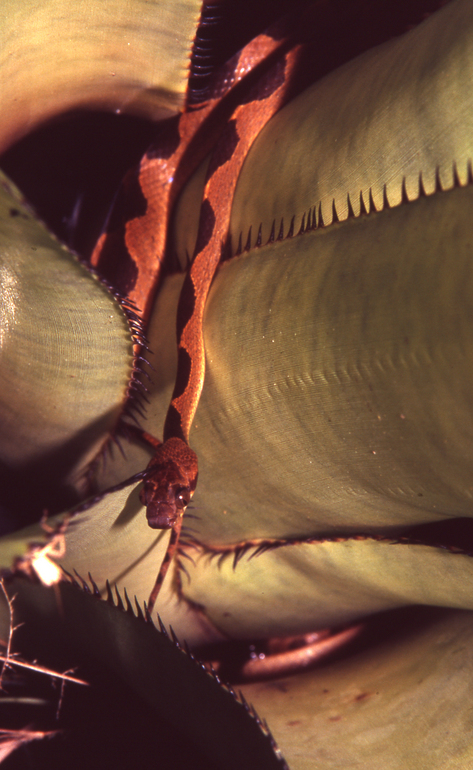
Leptodeira annulata

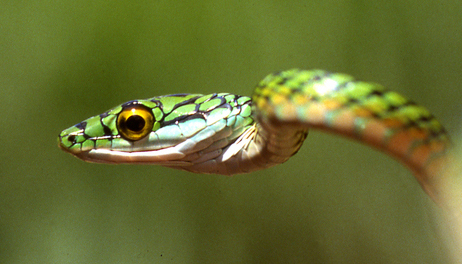
Leptophis ahaetulla

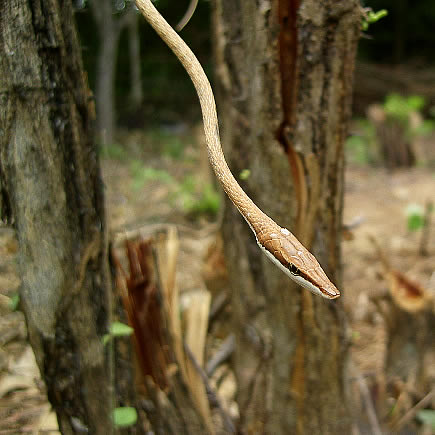
Oxybelis aeneus

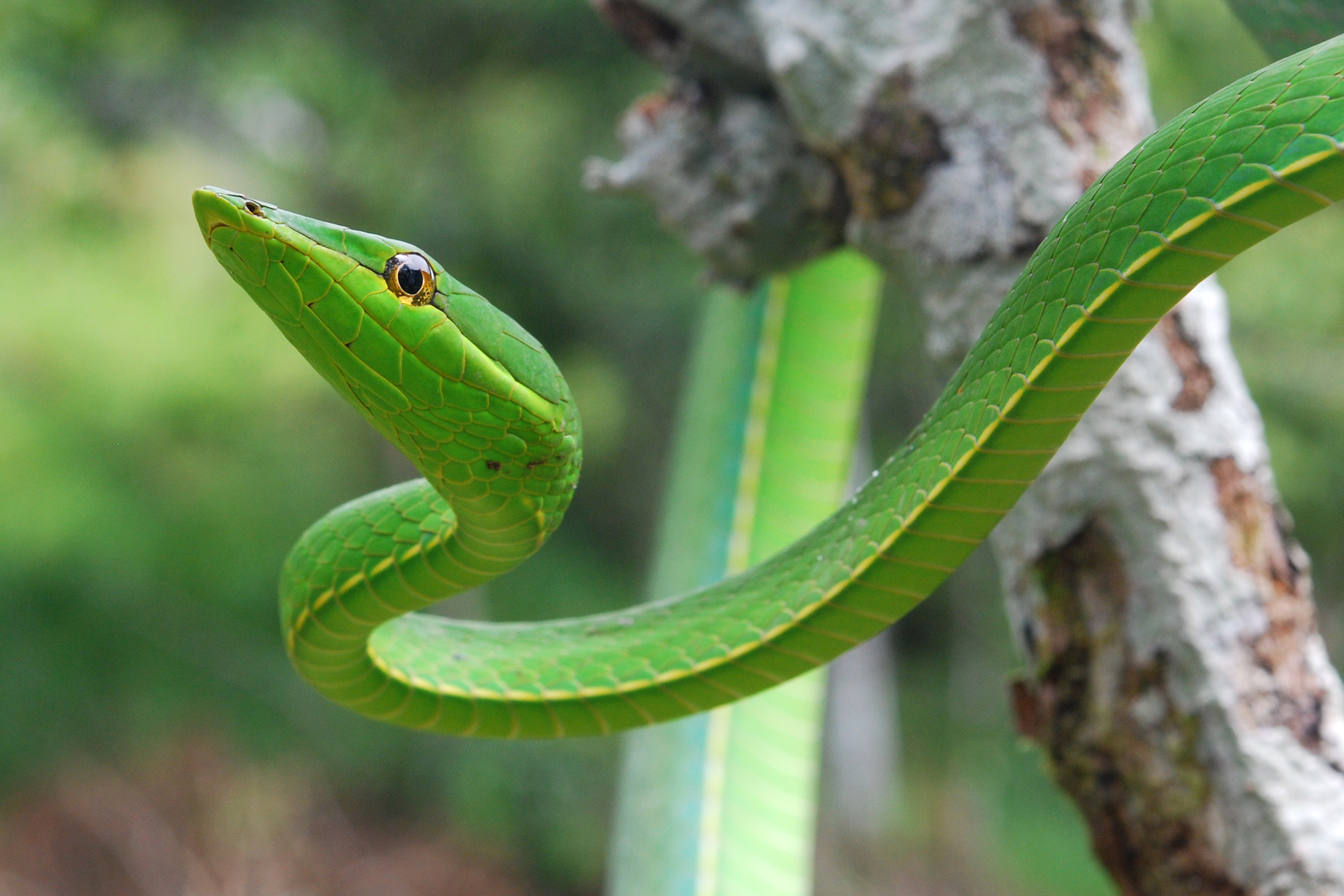
Oxybelis fulgidus

Order: Squamata · Family: Colubridae

The colubrids (Colubridæ) are a family of snakes with a worldwide distribution that includes all continents, except Antarctica. They are characterized by having their heads covered with large scales of a typical arrangement. The dorsal and lateral scales of the body are approximately rhomboidal in outline; On the ventral side they have a single row of widened scales. They are generally diurnal, with well-developed eyes and mainly circular pupils. Most are terrestrial, but there are also burrowing, amphibian, aquatic, arboreal and even gliding species. Although most colubrids are not venomous (or have a venom that does not affect humans), some species, such as those of the genus Boiga, can produce bites with significant medical effects. Colubrids form the largest family of snakes with a total of 1938 species, grouped into 304 genera. 31 species of colubrids occur in El Salvador.

- Chironius grandisquamis (Peters, 1869)
- Coluber mentovarius (Duméril, Bibron & Duméril, 1854)
- Drymarchon corais (Boie, 1827)
- Drymarchon melanurus (Duméril, Bibron & Duméril, 1854)
- Drymobius chloroticus (Cope, 1886)
- Drymobius margaritiferus (Schlegel, 1837)
- Lampropeltis triangulum (Lacépède, 1789)
- Leptodrymus pulcherrimus (Cope, 1874)
- Leptophis ahaetulla (Linnaeus, 1758)
- Leptophis mexicanus Duméril, Bibron & Duméril, 1854
- Leptophis modestus (Günther, 1872)
- Mastigodryas dorsalis (Bocourt, 1890)
- Mastigodryas melanolomus (Cope, 1868)
- Oxybelis aeneus (Wagler, 1824)
- Oxybelis fulgidus (Daudin, 1803)
- Oxyrhopus petolarius (Linnaeus, 1758)
- Pliocercus elapoides Cope, 1860
- Pseustes poecilonotus (Günther, 1858)
- Scaphiodontophis annulatus (Duméril, Bibron & Duméril, 1854)
- Scolecophis atrocinctus (Schlegel, 1837)
- Senticolis triaspis (Cope, 1866)
- Spilotes pullatus (Linnaeus, 1758)
- Stenorrhina degenhardtii (Berthold, 1846)
- Stenorrhina freminvillei (Duméril, Bibron & Duméril, 1854)
- Tantilla armillata Cope, 1876
- Tantilla brevicauda Mertens, 1952
- Tantilla melanocephala (Linnaeus, 1758)
- Tantilla schistosa (Bocourt, 1883)
- Tantilla taeniata Bocourt, 1883
- Tantilla vermiformis (Hallowell, 1861)
- Tantillita canula (Cope, 1876)

=== Dipsadidae ===
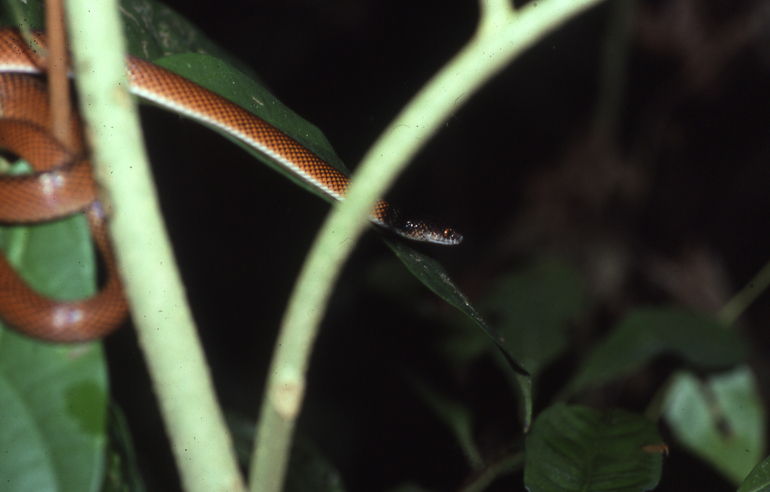
Clelia clelia

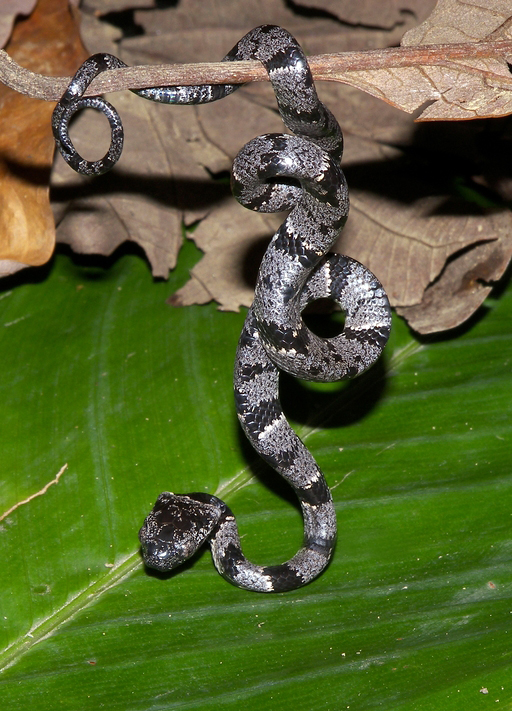
Sibon nebulatus

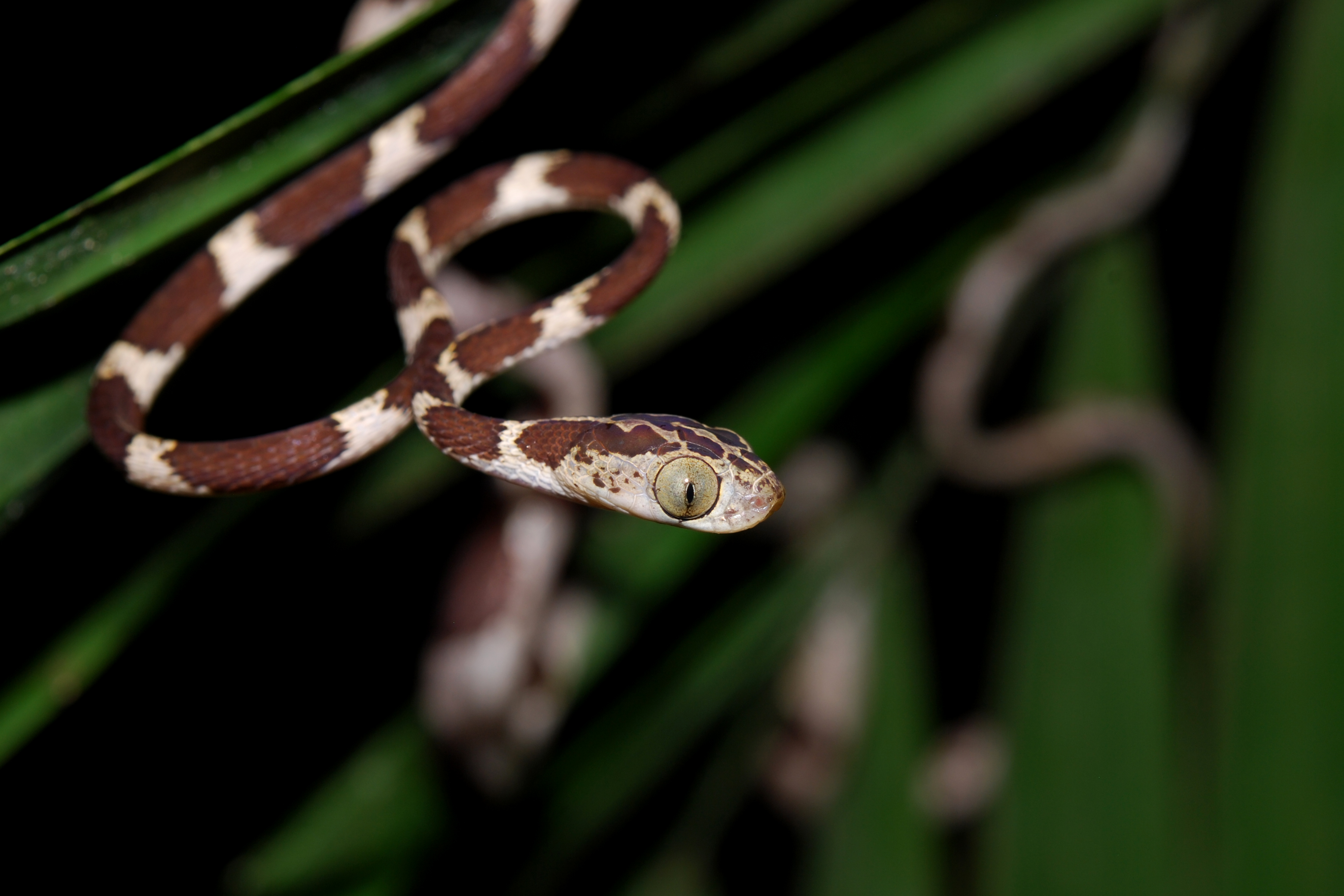
Imantodes cenchoa

Order: Squamata · Family: Dipsadidae

The dipsadids (Dipsadidae) are a family of snakes with a global distribution, consisting of 95 genera and 738 species. Some authors classify it as a subfamily (Dipsadinae) in the Colubridae family. 32 species occur in El Salvador.

- Clelia clelia (Daudin, 1803)
- Coniophanes bipunctatus (Günther, 1858)
- Coniophanes fissidens (Günther, 1858)
- Coniophanes piceivittis Cope, 1869
- Conophis lineatus (Duméril, Bibron & Duméril, 1854)
- Conophis pulcher Cope, 1869
- Crisantophis nevermanni (Dunn, 1937)
- Enulius flavitorques (Cope, 1868)
- Geophis fulvoguttatus Mertens, 1952
- Geophis rhodogaster (Cope, 1868)
- Imantodes cenchoa (Linnaeus, 1758)
- Imantodes gemmistratus (Cope, 1861)
- Leptodeira annulata (Linnaeus, 1758)
- Leptodeira nigrofasciata Günther, 1868
- Leptodeira polysticta Günther, 1895
- Leptodeira septentrionalis Kennicott, 1859
- Ninia espinali McCranie & Wilson, 1995
- Ninia maculata (Peters, 1861)
- Ninia sebae (Duméril, Bibron & Duméril, 1854)
- Rhadinaea decorata (Günther, 1858)
- Rhadinella godmani (Günther, 1865)
- Rhadinella kinkelini (Boettger, 1898)
- Rhadinella montecristi (Mertens, 1952)
- Rhadinella pilonaorum (Stuart, 1954)
- Sibon anthracops (Cope, 1868)
- Sibon carri (Shreve, 1951)
- Sibon dimidiatus (Günther, 1872)
- Sibon nebulatus (Linnaeus, 1758)
- Tretanorhinus nigroluteus Cope, 1861
- Tropidodipsas fischeri (Boulenger, 1894)
- Tropidodipsas sartorii Cope, 1863
- Xenodon rabdocephalus (Wied, 1824)

=== Natricidae ===
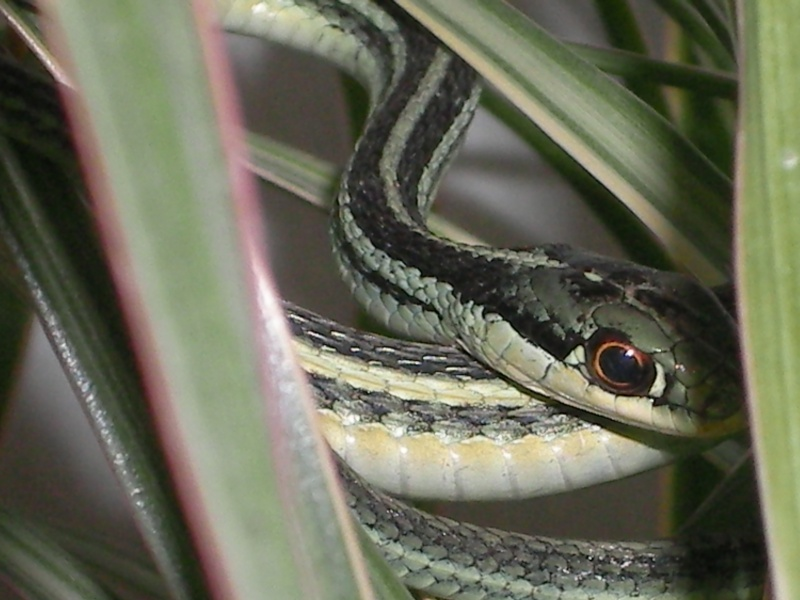
Thamnophis proximus

Order: Squamata · Family: Natricidae

The natricines (Natricidae) are a family of snakes with a global distribution, consisting of 222 species. Some authors classify it as a subfamily (Natracinae) in the Colubridae family. 3 species occur in El Salvador.

- Thamnophis fulvus (Bocourt, 1893)
- Thamnophis marcianus (Baird & Girard, 1853)
- Thamnophis proximus (Say, 1823)

=== Elapidae ===
Order: Squamata · Family: Elapidae

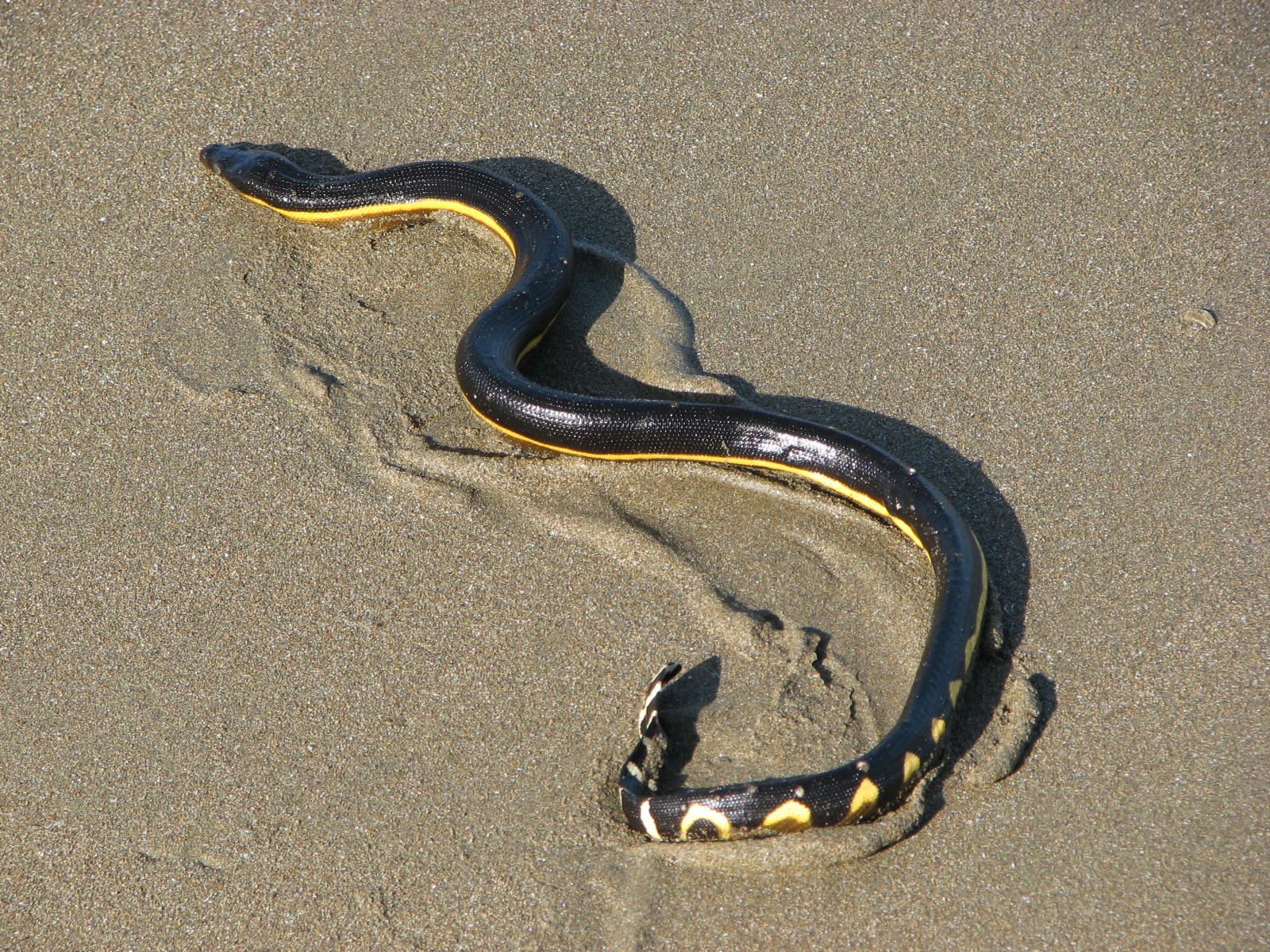
Hydrophis platurus

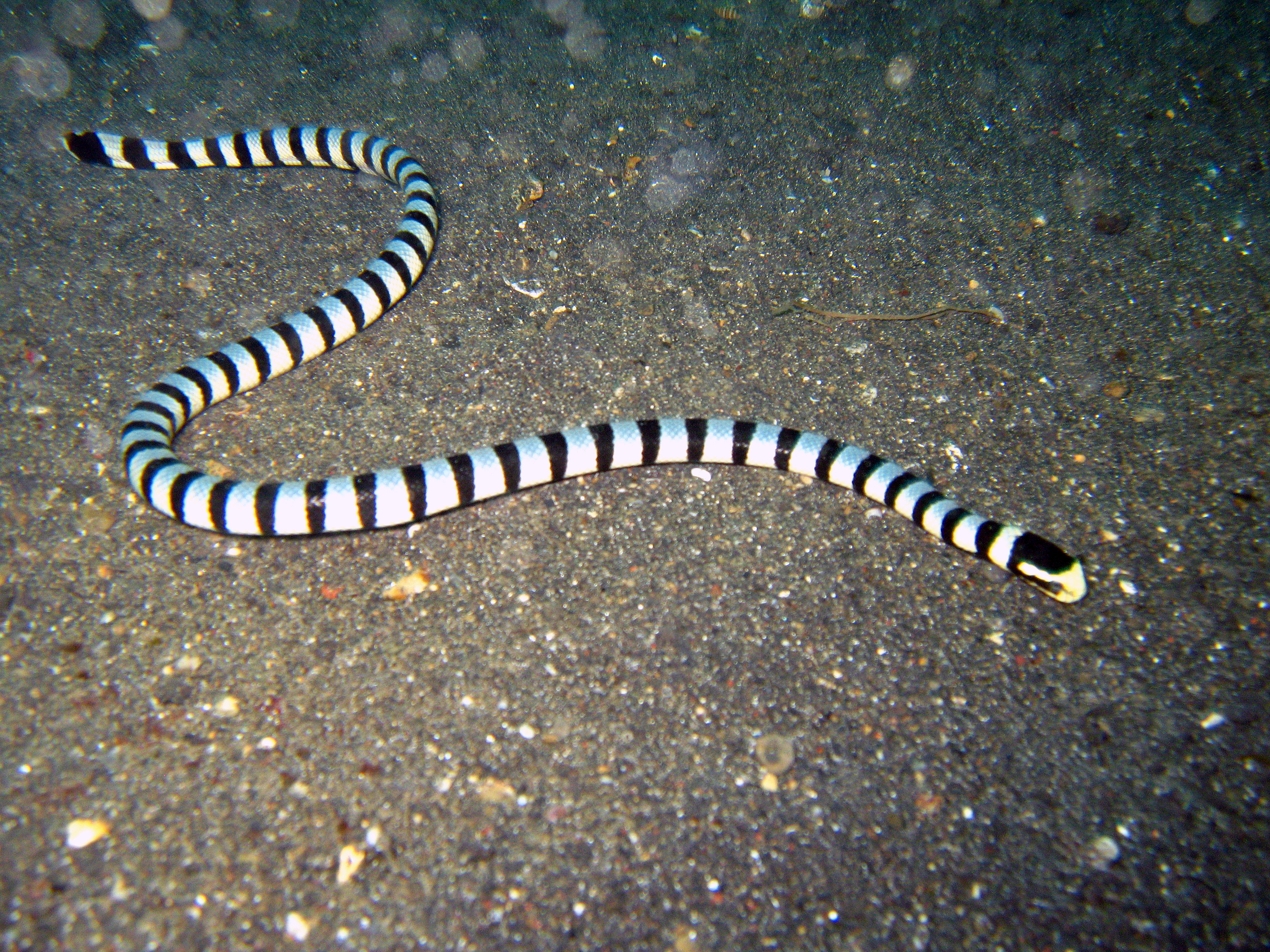
Laticauda colubrina

Elapids (Elapidae) are a family of highly venomous snakes that live in tropical and subtropical regions of the world. They are characterized by having fixed, hollow fangs through which they inject venom. Its size is very variable, between 18 centimetres (7.1 in) (Drysdalia) to more than 5 metres (16 ft) (Ophiophagus) in length. Some of its best-known members are cobras, coral snakes, mambas, and sea snakes. Outwardly, terrestrial elapids are similar to colubrids; Almost all have long, thin bodies, heads covered with large scales, and eyes with round pupils. Furthermore, their behavior is generally quite active, and many species are oviparous. Sea snakes, which are also elapids, have adapted to marine life in different ways and to varying degrees. Their characteristics may include laterally flattened bodies, rudder tails for swimming, and the ability to excrete salt. Currently, there are a total of 61 genera that include 325 species worldwide. Three species of Elapidae occur in El Salvador: a coral snake and two sea snakes.

- Hydrophis platurus (Linnaeus, 1766)
- Laticauda colubrina (Schneider, 1799)
- Micrurus nigrocinctus (Girard, 1854)

=== Viperidae ===
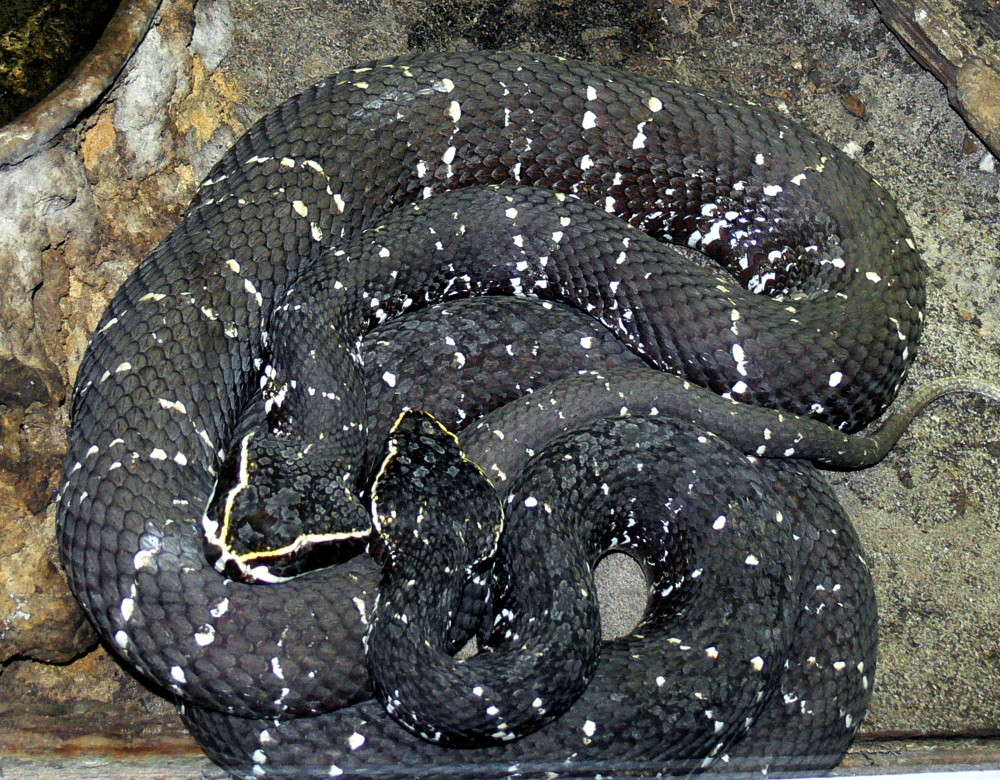
Agkistrodon bilineatus

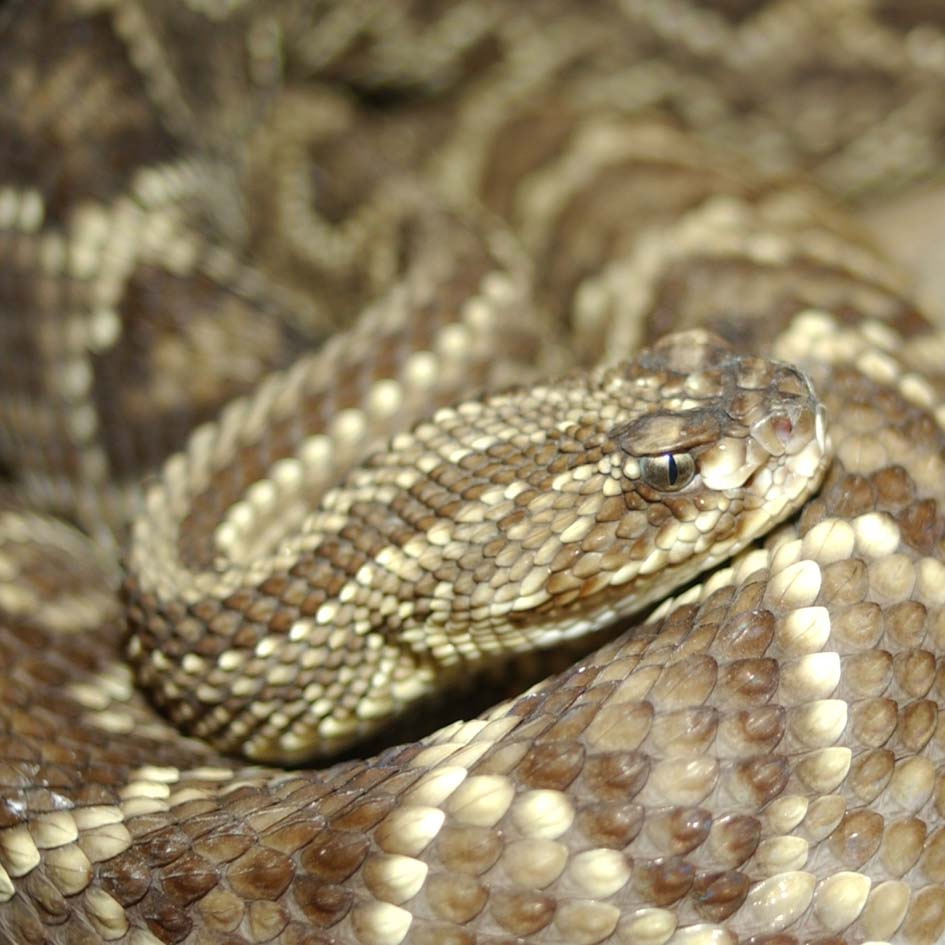
Crotalus durissus

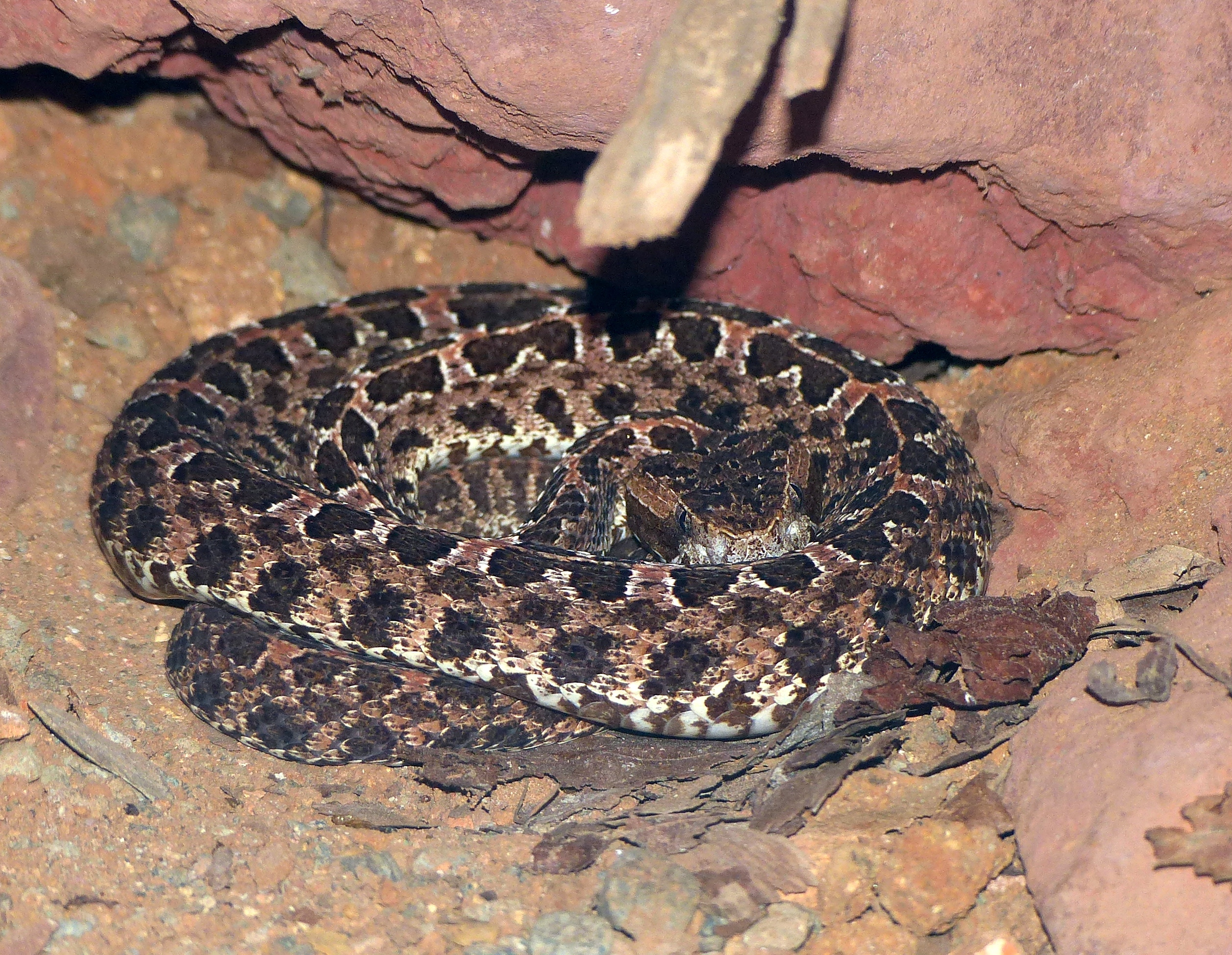
Porthidium ophryomegas

Order: Squamata · Family: Viperidae

The viperids (Viperidae) are a family of highly venomous snakes that comprises four subfamilies. The subfamily Crotalinae, commonly known as "pit vipers," are the only viperids native to the Americas. They have a loreal pit, a hole on each side of the head between the eye and the nostril; It is a thermoreceptor organ that is very sensitive to temperature variations and is used to detect warm-blooded prey. Approximately 224 species of viperids are distinguished, grouped into 32 genera. In El Salvador, 5 genera and 7 species occur.

- Agkistrodon bilineatus Günther, 1863
- Atropoides mexicanus (Duméril, Bibron & Duméril, 1854)
- Atropoides occiduus (Hoge, 1966)
- Cerrophidion wilsoni Jadin, Townsend, Castoe & Campbell, 2012
- Crotalus durissus Linnaeus, 1758
- Crotalus simus Latreille, 1801
- Porthidium ophryomegas (Bocourt, 1868)
