= List of reptiles of North America =

Reptiles of North America includes:

== Northern America ==
- List of reptiles of Canada
- Lists of reptiles of the United States

== Middle America ==
- List of reptiles of Mexico
- Central America and the Caribbean
  - List of reptiles of Guatemala
  - List of reptiles of El Salvador
  - List of reptiles of Costa Rica
  - List of reptiles of Puerto Rico
  - List of reptiles of Barbados
  - List of reptiles of Saint Lucia
  - List of reptiles of Martinique
  - List of reptiles of Guadeloupe
  - List of reptiles of Trinidad and Tobago

== See also ==
- List of amphibians of North America
