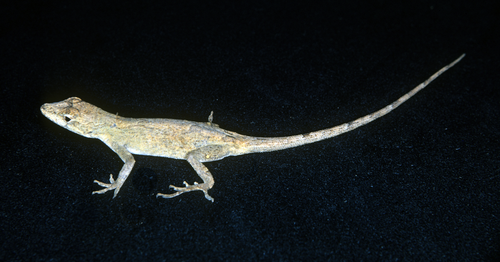

Conservation status
- Least Concern (IUCN 3.1)

Scientific classification
- Kingdom: Animalia
- Phylum: Chordata
- Class: Reptilia
- Order: Squamata
- Suborder: Iguania
- Family: Dactyloidae
- Genus: Anolis
- Species: A. laeviventris

Binomial name
- Anolis laeviventris (Wiegmann, 1834)

= Anolis laeviventris =

Species of lizard

Anolis laeviventris, the white anole, is a species of lizard in the family Dactyloidae. The species is found in Mexico, Guatemala, Honduras, Nicaragua, and Costa Rica.
