= Sceloporus squamosus =

Conservation status
- Least Concern (IUCN 3.1)

Scientific classification
- Domain: Eukaryota
- Kingdom: Animalia
- Phylum: Chordata
- Class: Reptilia
- Order: Squamata
- Suborder: Iguania
- Family: Phrynosomatidae
- Genus: Sceloporus
- Species: S. squamosus

Binomial name
- Sceloporus squamosus Bocourt, 1874

Species of lizard

Sceloporus squamosus, the Mexican spiny lizard or dwarf spiny lizard, is a species of lizard in the family Phrynosomatidae. It is found in Mexico, Guatemala, El Salvador, Nicaragua, Costa Rica, and Honduras.
