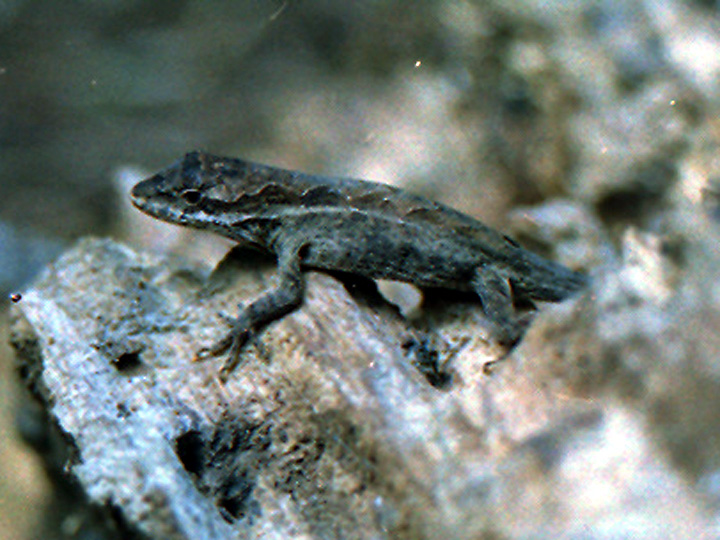

Conservation status
- Least Concern (IUCN 3.1)

Scientific classification
- Kingdom: Animalia
- Phylum: Chordata
- Class: Reptilia
- Order: Squamata
- Suborder: Iguania
- Family: Dactyloidae
- Genus: Anolis
- Species: A. crassulus

Binomial name
- Anolis crassulus Cope, 1864

= Anolis crassulus =

Species of lizard

Anolis crassulus, the ornate anole, is a species of lizard in the family Dactyloidae. The species is found in Guatemala, El Salvador, and Mexico. This species is characterized by its moderately to strongly enlarged medial dorsal scales, no more than two scales separating the supraorbital semicircles, four to seven rows of loreals, suboculars and supralabials in contact under the central portion of the orbit, enlarged postanals in males, and heterogeneous flank squamation.
