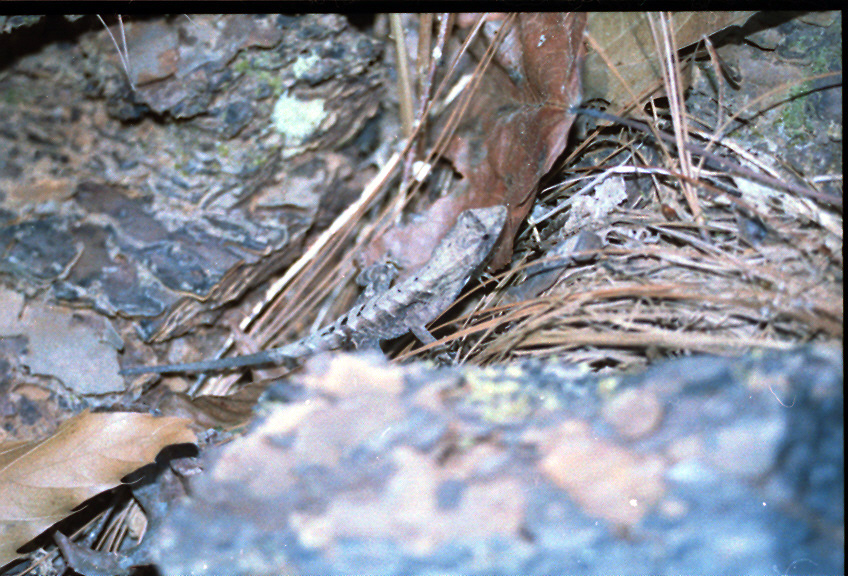

Conservation status
- Least Concern (IUCN 3.1)

Scientific classification
- Kingdom: Animalia
- Phylum: Chordata
- Class: Reptilia
- Order: Squamata
- Suborder: Iguania
- Family: Dactyloidae
- Genus: Anolis
- Species: A. tropidonotus

Binomial name
- Anolis tropidonotus Peters, 1863

= Anolis tropidonotus =

Species of lizard

Anolis tropidonotus, the greater scaly anole, is a species of lizard in the family Dactyloidae. The species is found in Mexico.
