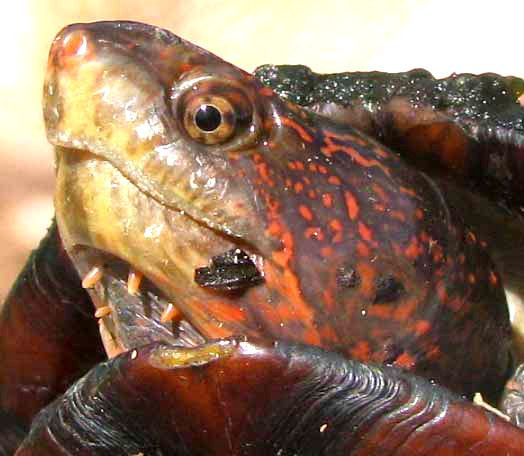
- Red-cheeked mud turtle (K. s. cruentatum), in Quintana Roo, Mexico

Conservation status
- Least Concern (IUCN 3.1)

Scientific classification
- Kingdom: Animalia
- Phylum: Chordata
- Class: Reptilia
- Order: Testudines
- Suborder: Cryptodira
- Family: Kinosternidae
- Genus: Kinosternon
- Species: K. scorpioides

Binomial name
- Kinosternon scorpioides (Linnaeus, 1766)

Synonyms
- List (K. s. scorpioides): Testudo scorpioides Linnaeus, 1766; Testudo tricarinata Retzius, 1792; Testudo retzii Daudin, 1801; Emys retzii Schweigger, 1812; Emys scorpioidea Schweigger, 1812 (ex errore); Emys scorpioides Oken, 1816; Chersine scorpioides Merrem, 1820; Terrapene tricarinata Merrem, 1820; Kinosternon brevicaudatum Spix, 1824; Kinosternon longicaudatum Spix, 1824; Kinosternon shavianum Bell, 1825; Terrapene retzii Fitzinger, 1826; Terrapene scorpioidea Fitzinger, 1826; Cinosternon brevicaudatum Wagler, 1830; Cinosternon longicaudatum Wagler, 1830; Cinosternon scorpioidea Wagler, 1830; Cinosternon shavianum Wagler, 1830; Clemmys tricarinata Wagler, 1830; Emys (Kinosternon) scorpoides Gray, 1831 (ex errore); Kinosternon scorpioides Gray, 1831; Monoclida retziana Rafinesque, 1832; Uronyx scorpioides Rafinesque, 1832; Cinosternon scorpioidei Wagler, 1833 (ex errore); Cinosternon scorpioideum Wagler, 1833 (ex errore); Terrapene scorpioides Schinz, 1833; Cinosternon scorpioides Duméril & Bibron, 1835; Kinosternon shawianum Duméril & Bibron, 1835 (ex errore); Clemmys (Cinosternon) scorpioidea Fitzinger, 1835; Kinosternon scorpoides Gray, 1844; Kinosternon (Swanka) scorpiodes Gray, 1844 (ex errore); Kinosternum brevicaudatum LeConte, 1854; Kinosternum longicaudatum LeConte, 1854; Kinosternum scorpioides LeConte, 1854; Cinosternum brevicaudatum Agassiz, 1857; Cinosternum longicaudatum Agassiz, 1857; Cinosternum scorpioides Agassiz, 1857; Cinosternum shavianum Agassiz, 1857; Thyrosternum longecaudatum LeConte, 1859 (ex errore); Thyrosternum scorpioides LeConte, 1859; Swanka scorpoides Gray, 1869; Swanka longicaudata Gray, 1870; Swanka scorpioides Gray, 1872; Cinosternon shawianum Bocourt, 1876; Ciniosternon shawianum Sumichrast, 1880; Cinosternum shawianum Sumichrast, 1882; Thyrosternum shavianum Garman, 1884; Cinosternum shawanianum Velasco, 1892 (ex errore); Cinosternum scorpioides scorpioides Siebenrock, 1907; Kinosternon scorpioides pachyurum Müller & Hellmich, 1936; Kinosternon scorpioides seriei Freiberg, 1936; Kinosternon panamensis Schmidt, 1946; Kinosternon scorpioides panamense Mertens & Wermuth, 1955 (ex errore); Kinosternon scorpioides scorpioides Mertens & Wermuth, 1955; Kinosternon scorpioides pachyrum Wermuth & Mertens, 1977 (ex errore); Kinosternon scorpioides serei Iverson, 1986 (ex errore); Kinosternon scorpioides serieli Gosławski & Hryniewicz, 1993 (ex errore); Kinosternon scorpioides carajanensis Rogner, 1996 (ex errore); (K. s. albogulare): Cinosternon albogulare Duméril & Bocourt, 1870; Cinosternum albogulare Cope, 1875; Kinosternon cruentatum albogulare Wettstein, 1934; Kinosternon scorpioides albogulare Dunn & Saxe, 1950; (K. s. cruentatum): Cinosternon cruentatum Duméril & Bibron, 1851; Kinosternum cruentatum LeConte, 1854; Kinosternum mexicanum LeConte, 1854; Kinosternon cruentatum Gray, 1856; Cinosternum cruentatum Agassiz, 1857; Cinosternum mexicanum Agassiz, 1857; Kinosternum triliratum LeConte, 1860; Cinosternon mexicanum Strauch, 1862; Cinosternon triliratum Strauch, 1862; Kinosternon mexicanum Müller, 1865; Swanka cruentata Gray, 1870; Swanka mexicana Gray, 1870; Swanka trilirata Gray, 1870; Thyrosternum cruentatum Garman, 1884; Cinosternum triliratum Günther, 1885; Kinosternon cruentatum cruentatum Schmidt, 1941; Kinosternon cruentatum consors Stejneger, 1941; Kinosternon crenulatum Pearse, 1945 (ex errore); Kinosternon scorpioides cruentatum Berry, 1979; Kinosternon cruentatum consor Obst, 1996 (ex errore)

= Scorpion mud turtle =

Species of turtle

The scorpion mud turtle or Tabasco mud turtle (Kinosternon scorpioides) is a species of mud turtle in the family Kinosternidae. It is found in Mexico, Central and South America.

== Description ==
The scorpion mud turtle is a medium to large kinosternid (mud turtle) with a domed, oval upper shell 92–270 mm (3.6–10.6 in) long. Males regularly exceed 200 mm. The scorpion mud turtle is a highly aquatic, adaptable kinosternid that will live in almost any body of water.

== Subspecies ==
Subspecies	Common name	Image
K. s. scorpioides (Linnaeus, 1766)	Scorpion mud turtle	In Bolívar, Colombia
K. s. albogulare (Duméril and Bibron, 1870)	White-throated mud turtle	In San Andrés, Colombia
K. s. cruentatum (Duméril, Bibron & Duméril, 1851)	Red-cheeked mud turtle	In southern Tamaulipas, Mexico

== Diet ==
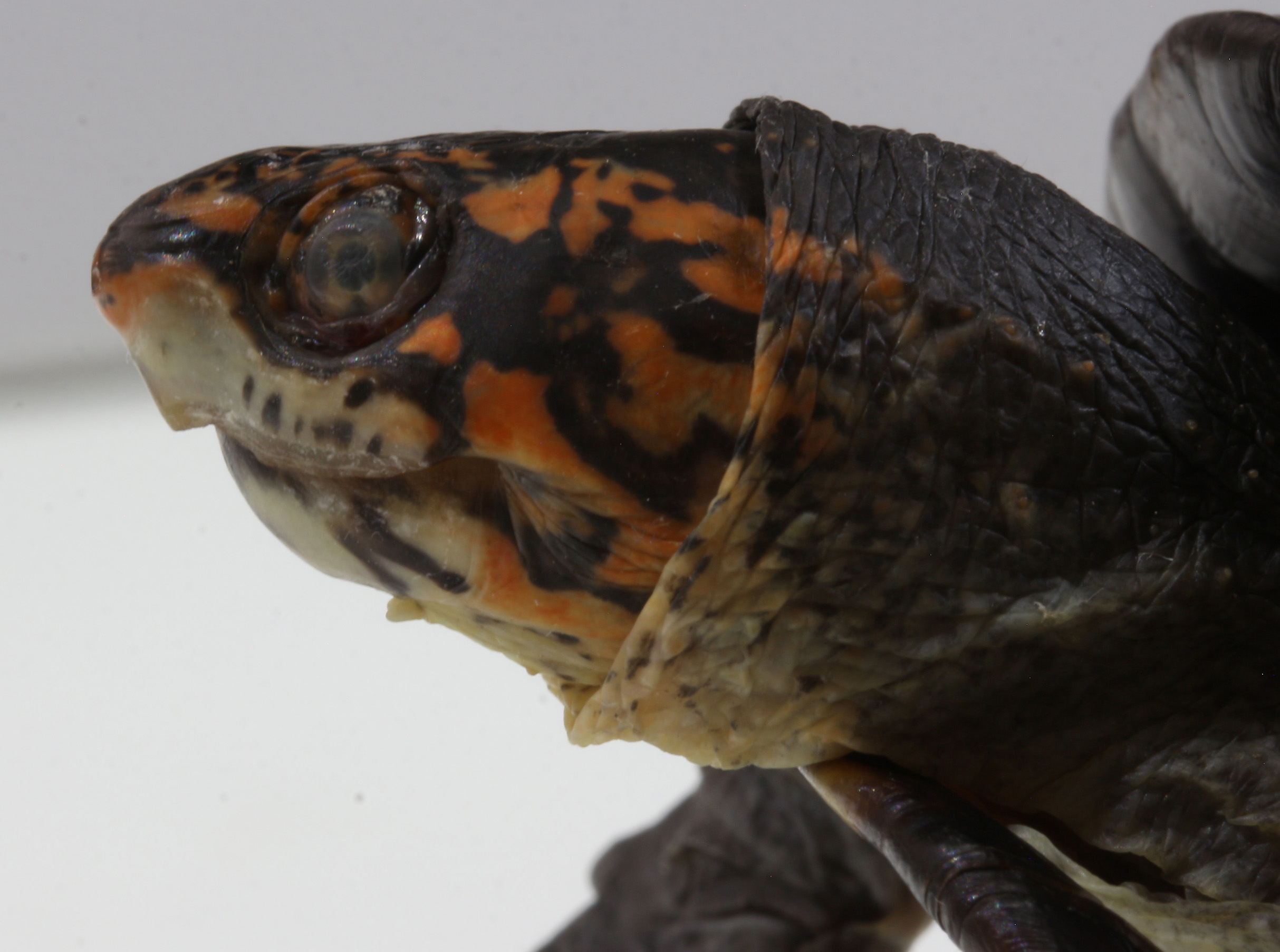
Showing head markings.

It is primarily omnicarnivorous, a glutton, and feeds on a wide variety of aquatic invertebrates (such as insects and their larvae, spiders, shrimp, crabs, snails and worms) and vertebrates (such as fish and frogs), as well as carrion and bird eggshells.

It also feeds on plant material such as algae, fruits, flowers, nuts, seeds and aquatic plants.

In captivity, poorly fed K. scorpioides can be cannibalistic, biting off the toes and limbs of conspecifics.

== Reproduction and habitat ==
Females probably lay 1 to 6 hard-shelled eggs. Like many kinosternids, they probably construct a shallow terrestrial nest with little cover.

== Gallery ==
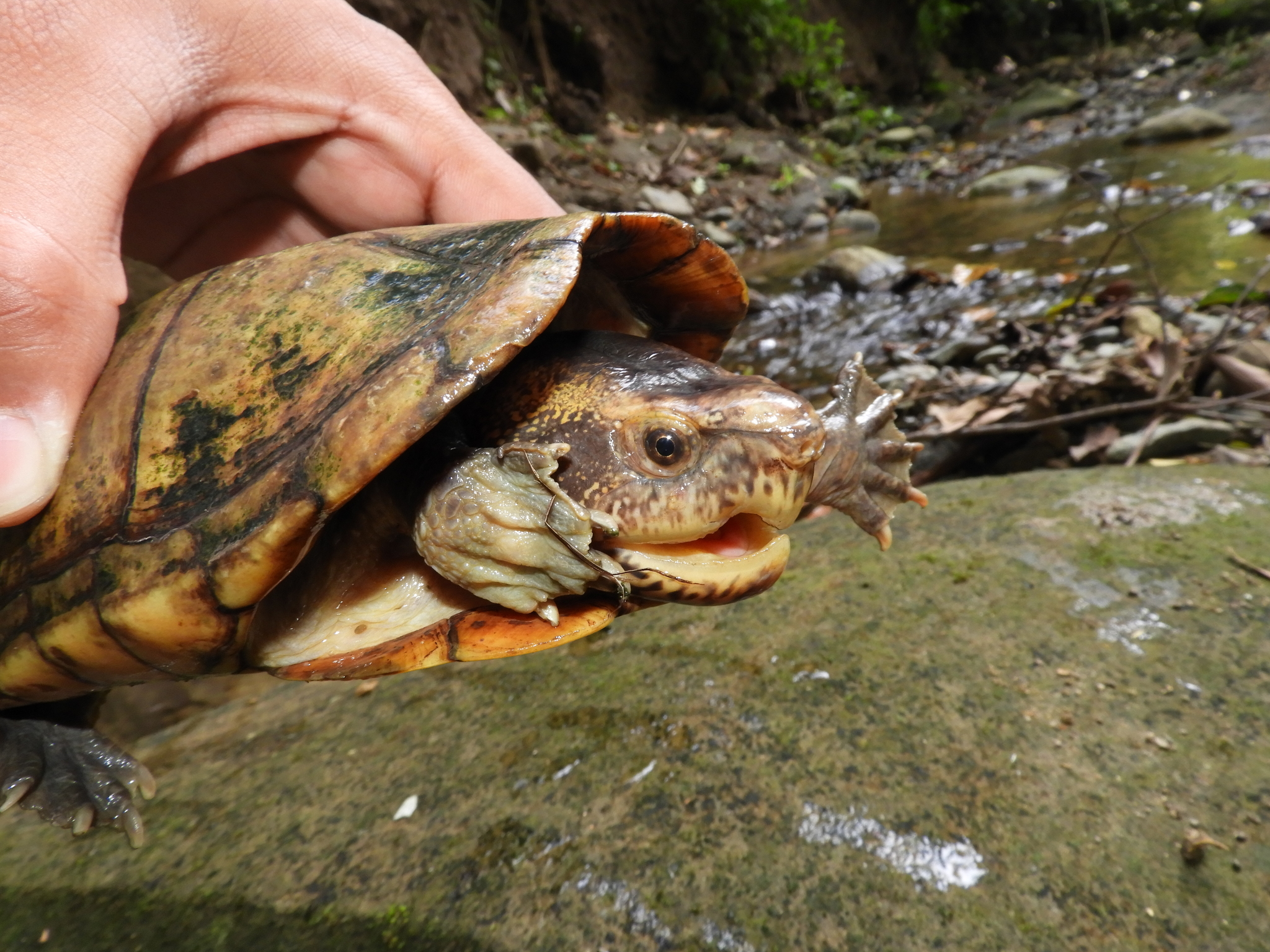
K. s. scorpioides, Bolívar, Colombia

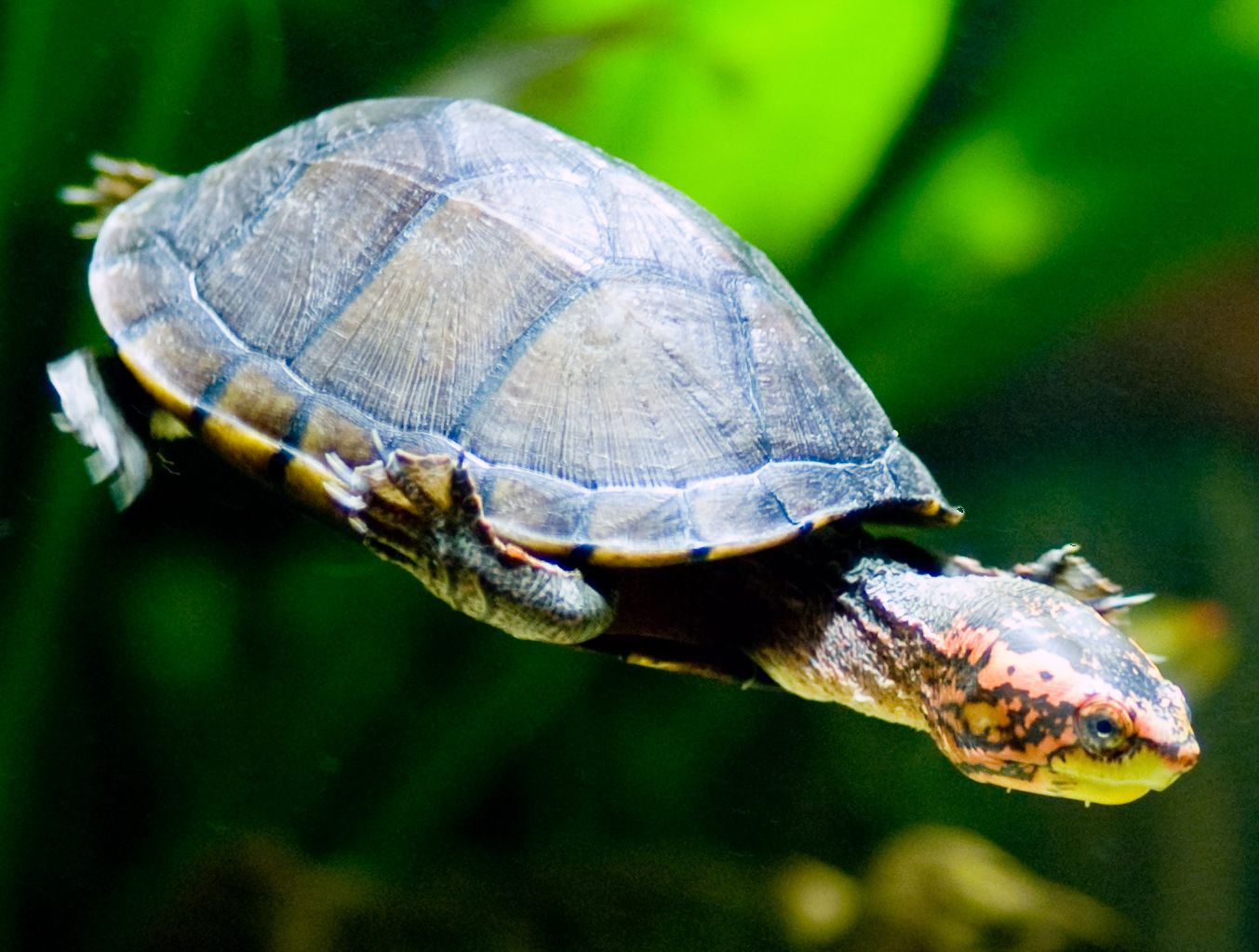
1 year old captive K. s. cruentatum

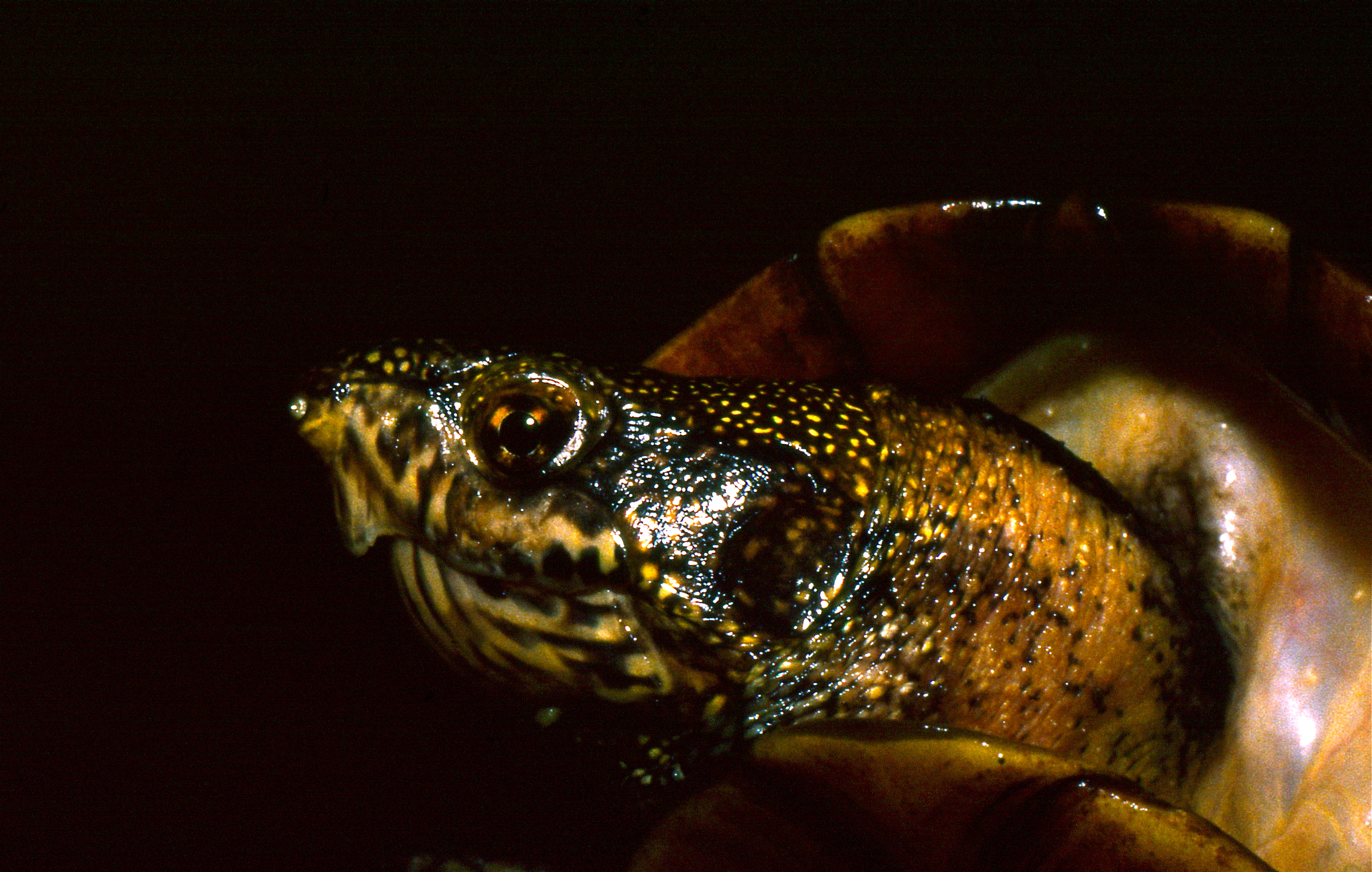
La Fortuna de San Carlos, Costa Rica

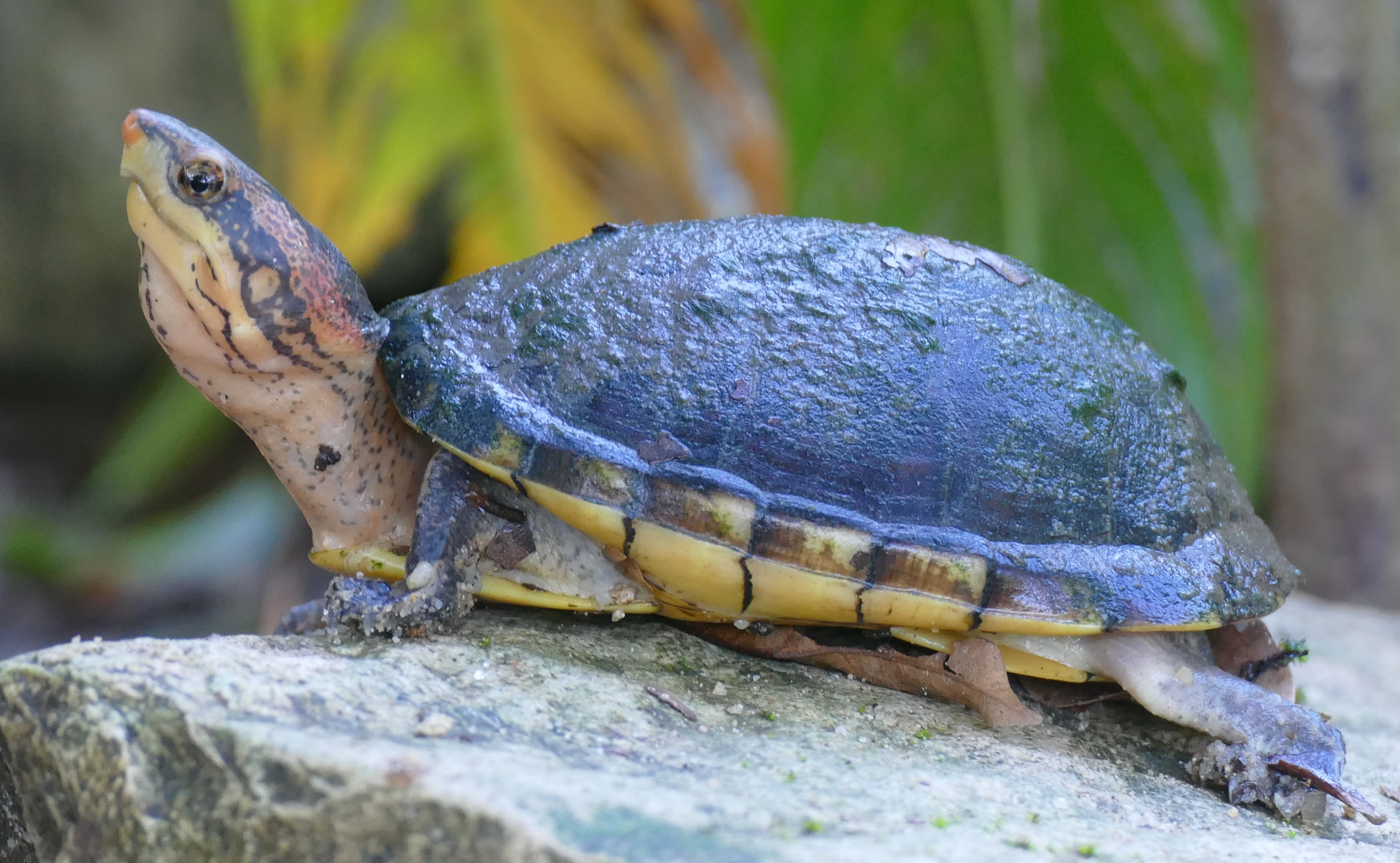
Aluxes Ecopark, Chiapas, Mexico

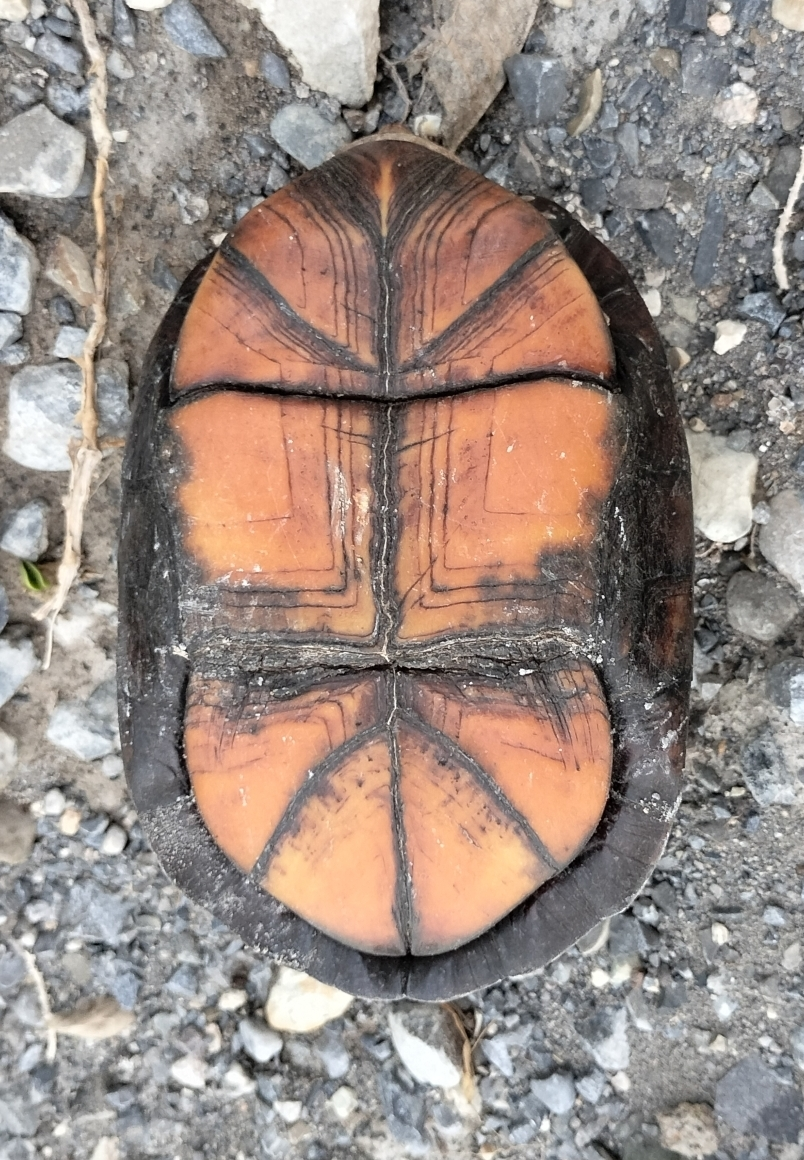
K. s. cruentatum plastron, Tamaulipas, Mexico

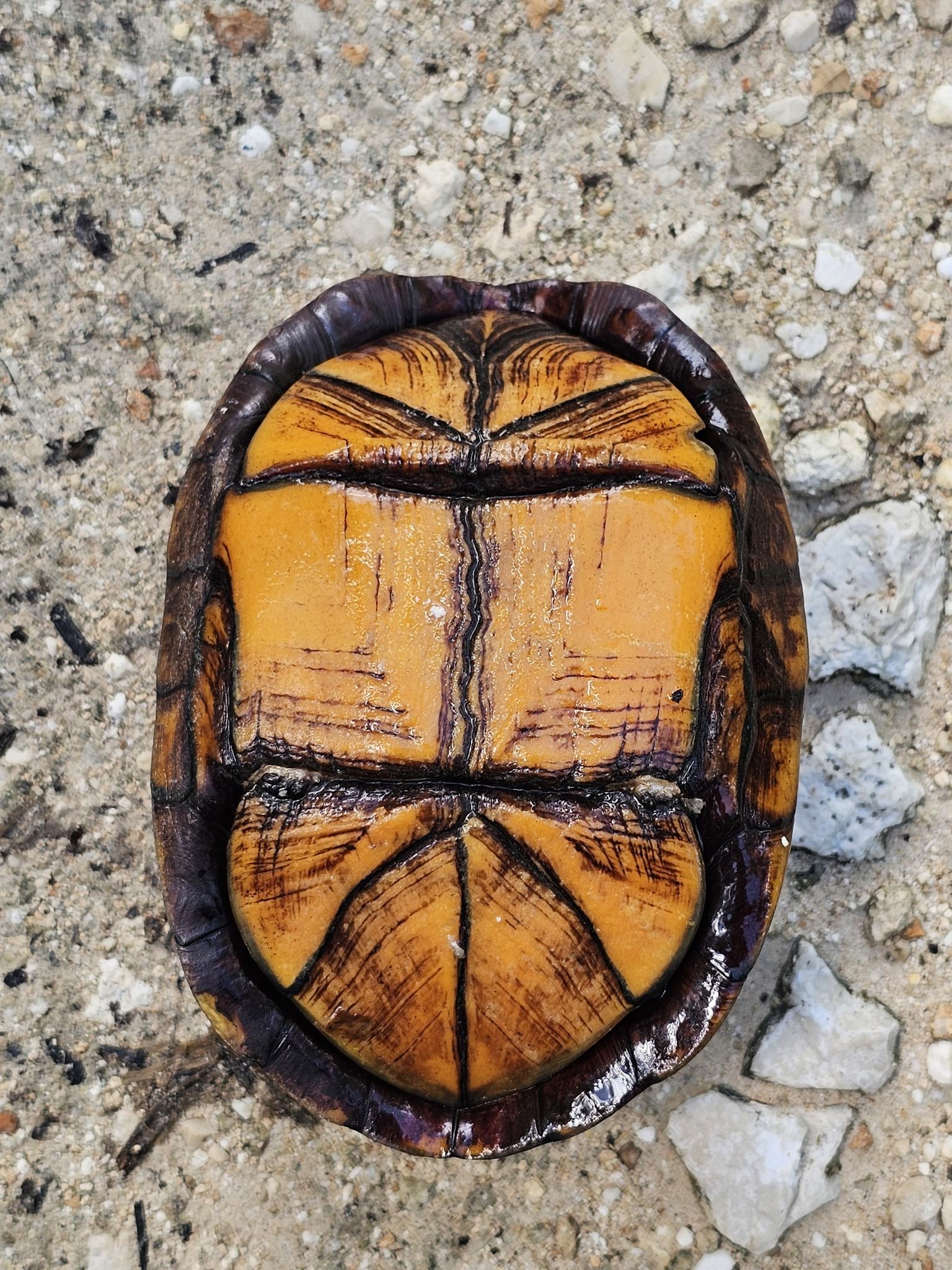
Plastron, in Campeche, Mexico

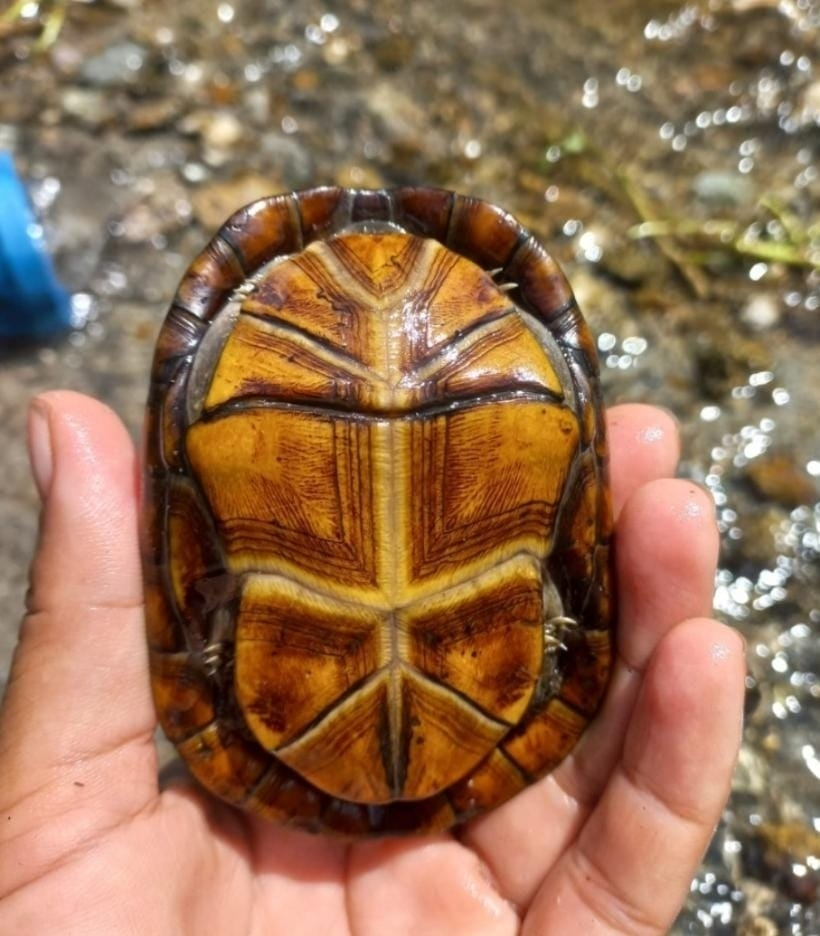
Plastron, in Panama

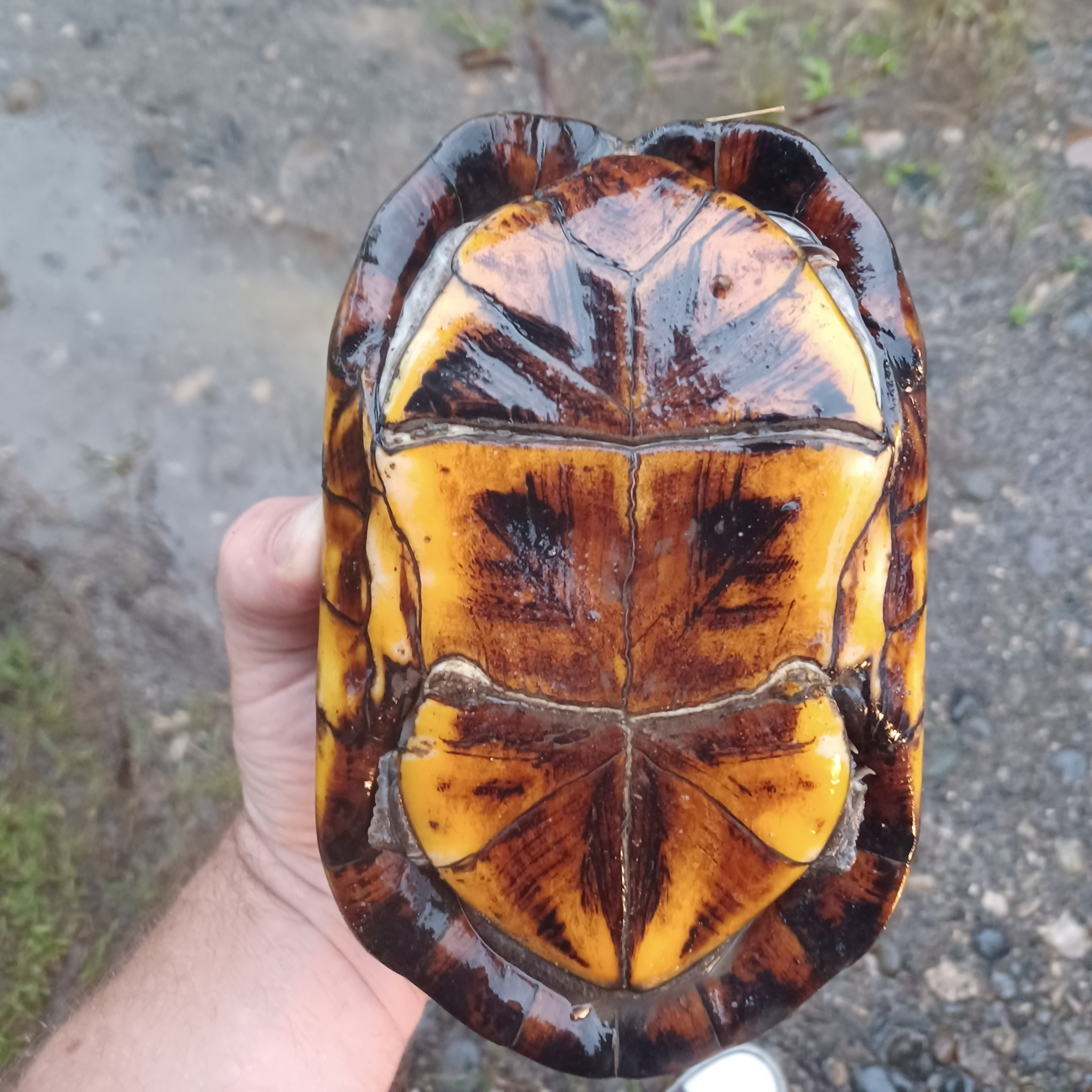
Plastron, in Puntarenas, Costa Rica
