= Anolis serranoi =

Conservation status
- Least Concern (IUCN 3.1)

Scientific classification
- Kingdom: Animalia
- Phylum: Chordata
- Class: Reptilia
- Order: Squamata
- Suborder: Iguania
- Family: Dactyloidae
- Genus: Anolis
- Species: A. serranoi

Binomial name
- Anolis serranoi (G. Köhler, 1999)

Synonyms
- Anolis biporcatus — Oeser, 1933 (partim); Anolis lemurinus bourgeaei — Mertens, 1952 (partim); Norops lemurinus — Villa, 1988 (partim); Norops serranoi G. Köhler, 1999; Anolis serranoi — Liner, 2007

Species of lizard

Anolis serranoi, Serrano's anole, is a species of lizard in the family Dactyloidae. The species is endemic to Central America.

== Etymology ==
The specific name, serranoi, is in honor of Dr. Francisco Serrano, a biologist and conservationist in El Salvador.

== Geographic range ==
A. serranoi inhabits areas at up to 1,000 m (3,280 ft) altitude along the Pacific shores of Central America from Chiapas, Mexico, through Guatemala, to El Salvador.

== Description ==
A. serranoi has long hind limbs, a divided prenasal scale, and a red dewlap in adult males.

== Reproduction ==
A. serranoi is oviparous.
