= Sceloporus acanthinus =

Conservation status
- Least Concern (IUCN 3.1)

Scientific classification
- Kingdom: Animalia
- Phylum: Chordata
- Class: Reptilia
- Order: Squamata
- Suborder: Iguania
- Family: Phrynosomatidae
- Genus: Sceloporus
- Species: S. acanthinus

Binomial name
- Sceloporus acanthinus Bocourt, 1873

Species of lizard

Sceloporus acanthinus, also known commonly as Bocourt's spiny lizard and la espinosa de Bocourt in Spanish, is a species of lizard in the family Phrynosomatidae. The species is native to extreme southern Mexico and Guatemala.
