= Hispaniolan green anole =

There are three species of lizard named Hispaniolan green anole:

- Anolis chlorocyanus, endemic to Hispaniola
- Anolis callainus, found in the Dominican Republic
- Anolis peynadoi, found in the Dominican Republic
