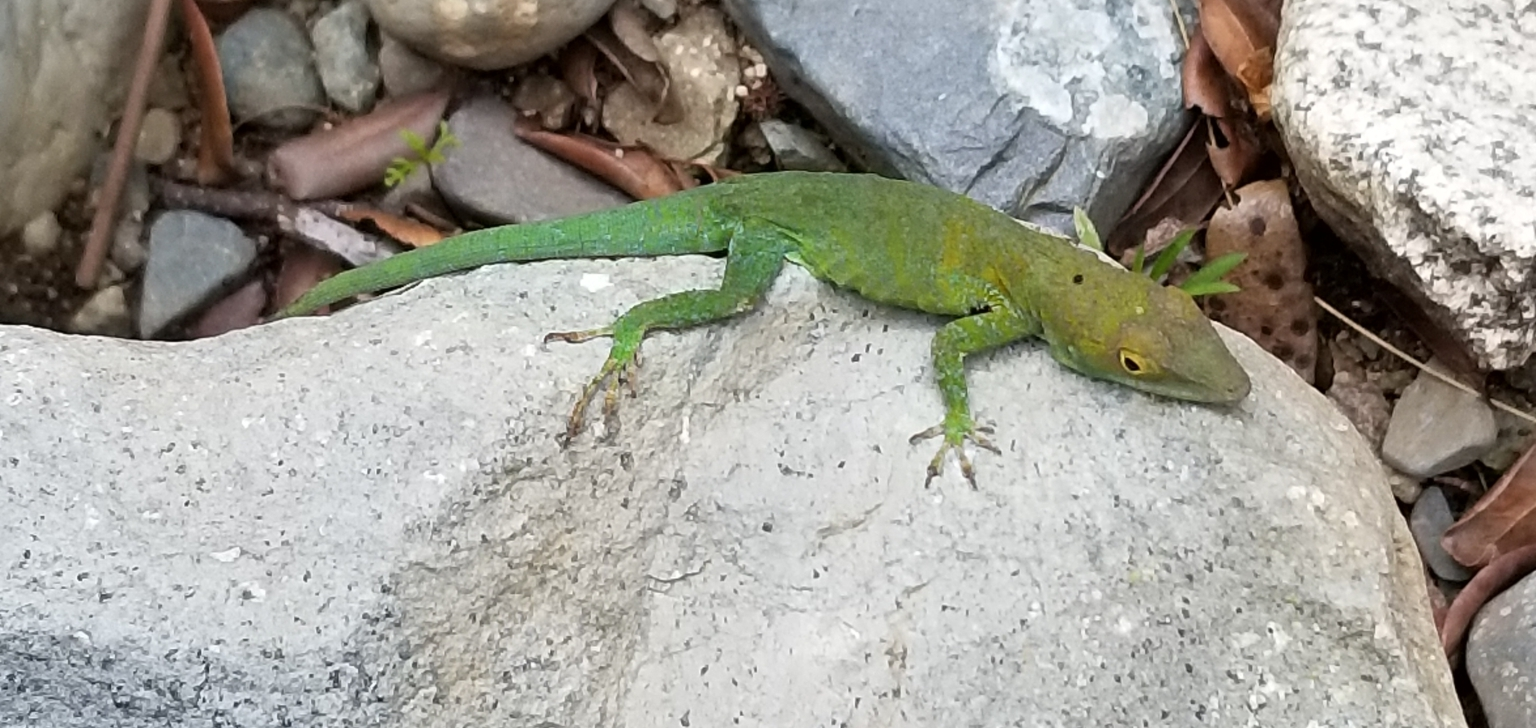

Conservation status
- Least Concern (IUCN 3.1)

Scientific classification
- Kingdom: Animalia
- Phylum: Chordata
- Class: Reptilia
- Order: Squamata
- Suborder: Iguania
- Family: Dactyloidae
- Genus: Anolis
- Species: A. aliniger

Binomial name
- Anolis aliniger Mertens, 1939

Synonyms
- Anolis chloro-cyanus aliniger Mertens, 1939

= Anolis aliniger =

Species of lizard

Anolis aliniger, the axillary spotted anole, northern green twig anole, or La Vega anole, is a species of lizard in the family Dactyloidae. The species is endemic to Hispaniola.

== Taxonomy ==
The first description of Anolis aliniger was published in 1939 by Robert Mertens, who used the name Anolis chloro-cyanus aliniger. According to Robert Powell, the name aliniger is presumably derived from the Latin ala and niger, meaning 'arm' or 'wing' and 'black' respectively, in reference to the anole's characteristic black axilliary spots.

The holotype, a male, was collected in March of the same year by Mertens, with the type locality being Paso Bajito, located on the northern rim of the Constanza Valley of the Cordillera Central, in La Vega Province, Dominican Republic, at an elevation of about 900 m (3,000 ft). Ernest E. Williams was the first to recognize aliniger as a species in its own right rather than as a subspecies of Anolis chlorocyanus, doing so in 1965.

A 2016 paper by Gunther Köhler and Stephen Blair Hedges described a new species, Anolis apletolepis, with multiple specimens previously considered to be Anolis aliniger being recognized as members of the newly described species.

== Description ==
A. aliniger is a medium-sized green anole, with the maximum recorded snout–vent length being 58 mm (2.3 in) for males and 52 mm (2.0 in) for females. It has a slightly stockier build than A. chlorocyanus and relatively short legs. It is capable of quickly changing colour from its usual green to brown. Its dewlap is underdeveloped and yellowish-green, also capable of quickly changing colour to brown. It has a characteristic black axilla.

== Distribution and habitat ==
A. aliniger is endemic to Hispaniola. Its range includes parts of both the Dominican Republic and Haiti, with most of it being inside of the former. Its natural habitat consists of montane broadleaf forests at elevations of 900–1,600 m (3,000–5,200 ft), but it can also be found in banana plantations.
