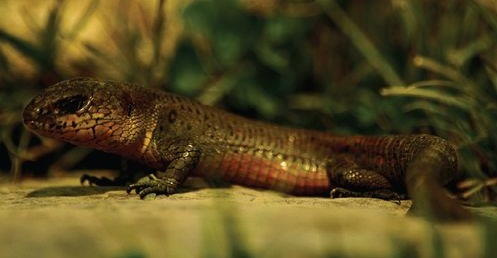
- Euspondylus chasqui, holotype male

Scientific classification
- Kingdom: Animalia
- Phylum: Chordata
- Class: Reptilia
- Order: Squamata
- Family: Gymnophthalmidae
- Tribe: Cercosaurini
- Genus: Euspondylus; Tschudi, 1845

= Euspondylus =

Genus of lizards

Euspondylus is a genus of lizards in the family Gymnophthalmidae.

== Geographic range ==
The genus Euspondylus is endemic to northern South America.

== Species ==
The following 10 species are recognized as being valid.

- Euspondylus acutirostris (W. Peters, 1863) – sharp-snouted sun tegu
- Euspondylus auyanensis Myers, G. Rivas & Jadin, 2009
- Euspondylus caideni G. Köhler, 2003
- Euspondylus excelsum Chávez, Catenazzi & Venegas, 2017
- Euspondylus guentheri (O'Shaughnessy, 1881) – Günther's sun tegu
- Euspondylus maculatus Tschudi, 1845 – spotted sun tegu
- Euspondylus monsfumus Mijares-Urrutia, Señaris & Arends, 2001
- Euspondylus nellycarrillae G. Köhler & Lehr, 2004
- Euspondylus paxcorpus Doan & Adams, 2015
- Euspondylus simonsii Boulenger, 1901 – Simons' sun tegu

Nota bene: A binomial authority in parentheses indicates that the species was originally described in a genus other than Euspondylus.
