= Northern Hispaniolan green anole =

There are two species of lizard found in the Dominican Republic named Northern Hispaniolan green anole:

- Anolis callainus
- Anolis peynadoi
