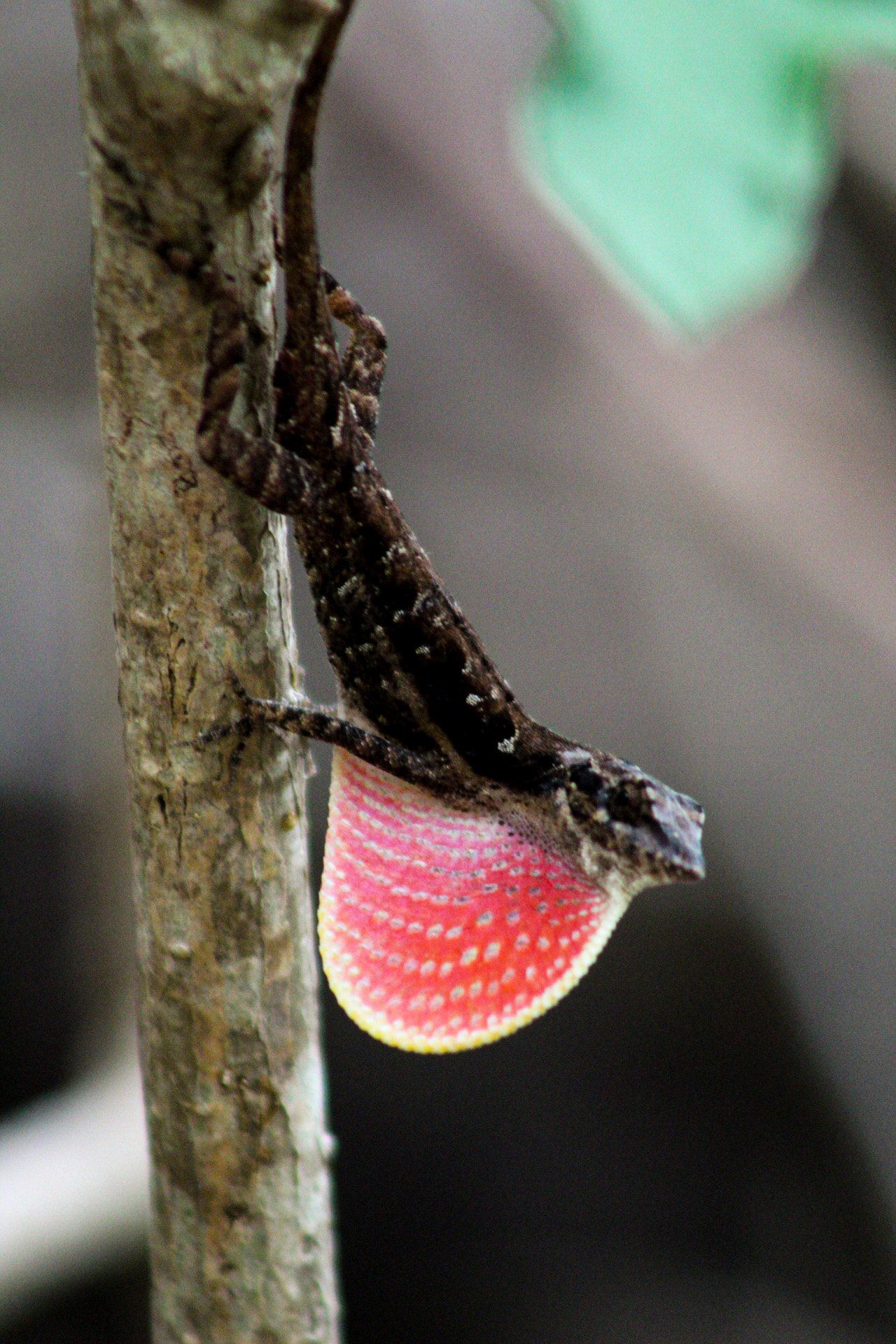

Scientific classification
- Domain: Eukaryota
- Kingdom: Animalia
- Phylum: Chordata
- Class: Reptilia
- Order: Squamata
- Suborder: Iguania
- Family: Dactyloidae
- Genus: Anolis
- Species: A. immaculogularis

Binomial name
- Anolis immaculogularis Köhler et al., 2014

= Anolis immaculogularis =

Species of lizard

Anolis immaculogularis is a species of anole lizard first found in the Mexican states of Oaxaca, Guerrero, and Puebla. The species has keeled ventral scales.
