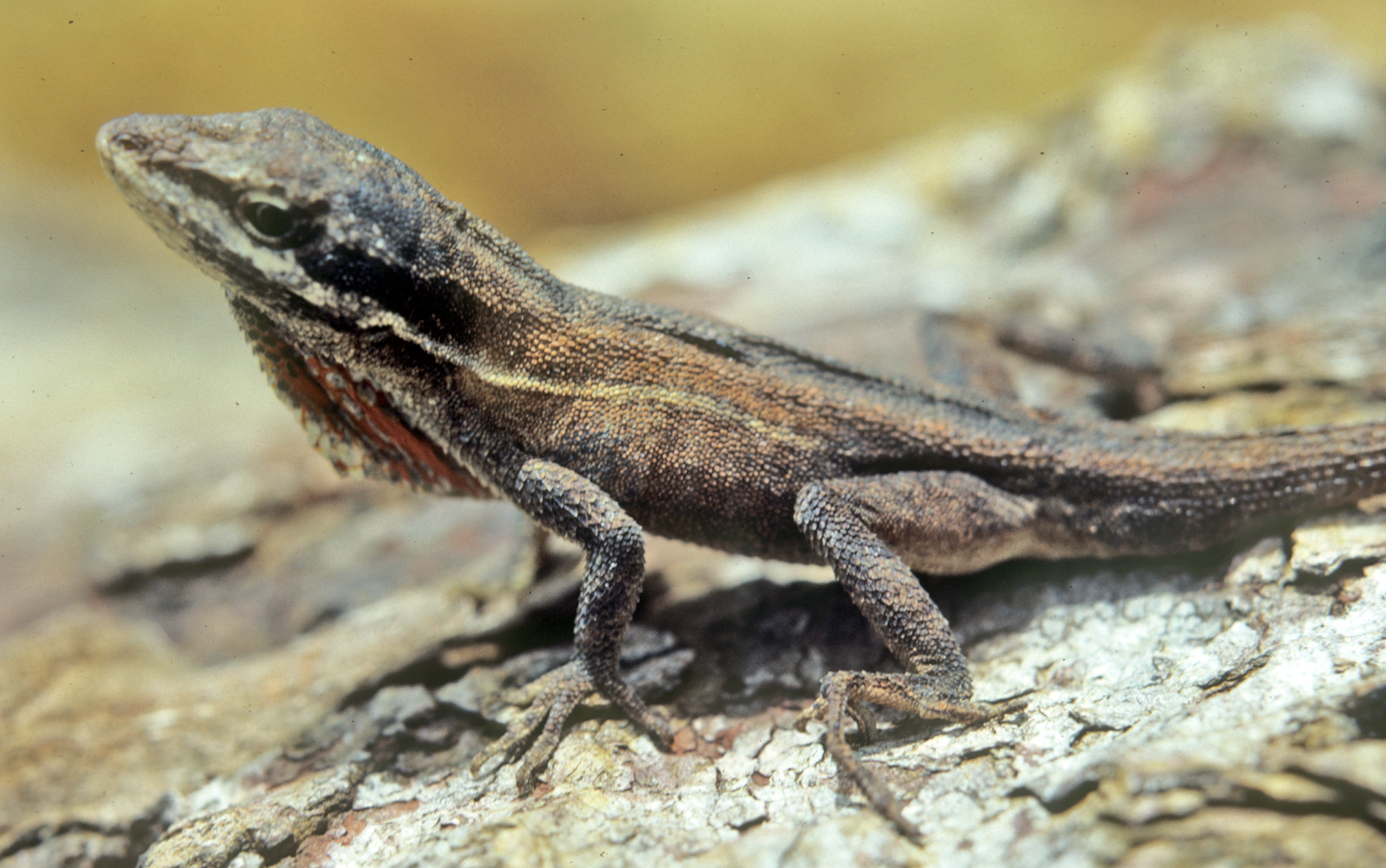

Conservation status
- Near Threatened (IUCN 3.1)

Scientific classification
- Kingdom: Animalia
- Phylum: Chordata
- Class: Reptilia
- Order: Squamata
- Suborder: Iguania
- Family: Dactyloidae
- Genus: Anolis
- Species: A. haguei

Binomial name
- Anolis haguei L.C. Stuart, 1942

Synonyms
- Anolis haguei L.C. Stuart, 1942; Anolis crassulus haguei — L.C. Stuart, 1948; Norops haguei — G. Köhler, McCranie & L.D. Wilson, 1999

= Anolis haguei =

Species of lizard

Anolis haguei, also known commonly as Hague's anole, is a species of lizard in the family Dactyloidae. The species is endemic to Guatemala.

== Etymology ==
The specific name, haguei, is in honor of Henry Hague who in 1867 led a collecting expedition in Guatemala for the Smithsonian Institution.

== Habitat ==
The preferred natural habitat of A. haguei is forest, at altitudes of 1,750–2,100 m (5,740–6,890 ft).

== Reproduction ==
A. haguei is oviparous.
