= Anolis brianjuliani =

Scientific classification
- Kingdom: Animalia
- Phylum: Chordata
- Class: Reptilia
- Order: Squamata
- Suborder: Iguania
- Family: Dactyloidae
- Genus: Anolis
- Species: A. brianjuliani

Binomial name
- Anolis brianjuliani Köhler Petersen, & Méndez de la Cruz, 2019)

Species of lizard

Anolis brianjuliani is a species of lizard in the family Dactyloidae. The species is found in Mexico.
