= Anolis sacamecatensis =

Scientific classification
- Kingdom: Animalia
- Phylum: Chordata
- Class: Reptilia
- Order: Squamata
- Suborder: Iguania
- Family: Anolidae
- Genus: Anolis
- Species: A. sacamecatensis

Binomial name
- Anolis sacamecatensis Köhler et al., 2014

Species of lizard

Anolis sacamecatensis is a species of anole lizard first found in the Mexican states of Oaxaca, Guerrero, and Puebla. The species has keeled ventral scales.
