= Anolis leditzigorum =

Scientific classification
- Kingdom: Animalia
- Phylum: Chordata
- Class: Reptilia
- Order: Squamata
- Suborder: Iguania
- Family: Anolidae
- Genus: Anolis
- Species: A. leditzigorum

Binomial name
- Anolis leditzigorum (Köhler, Vargas, & Lotzkat, 2014)

Species of lizard

Anolis leditzigorum is a species of lizard in the family Dactyloidae. The species is found in Costa Rica.
