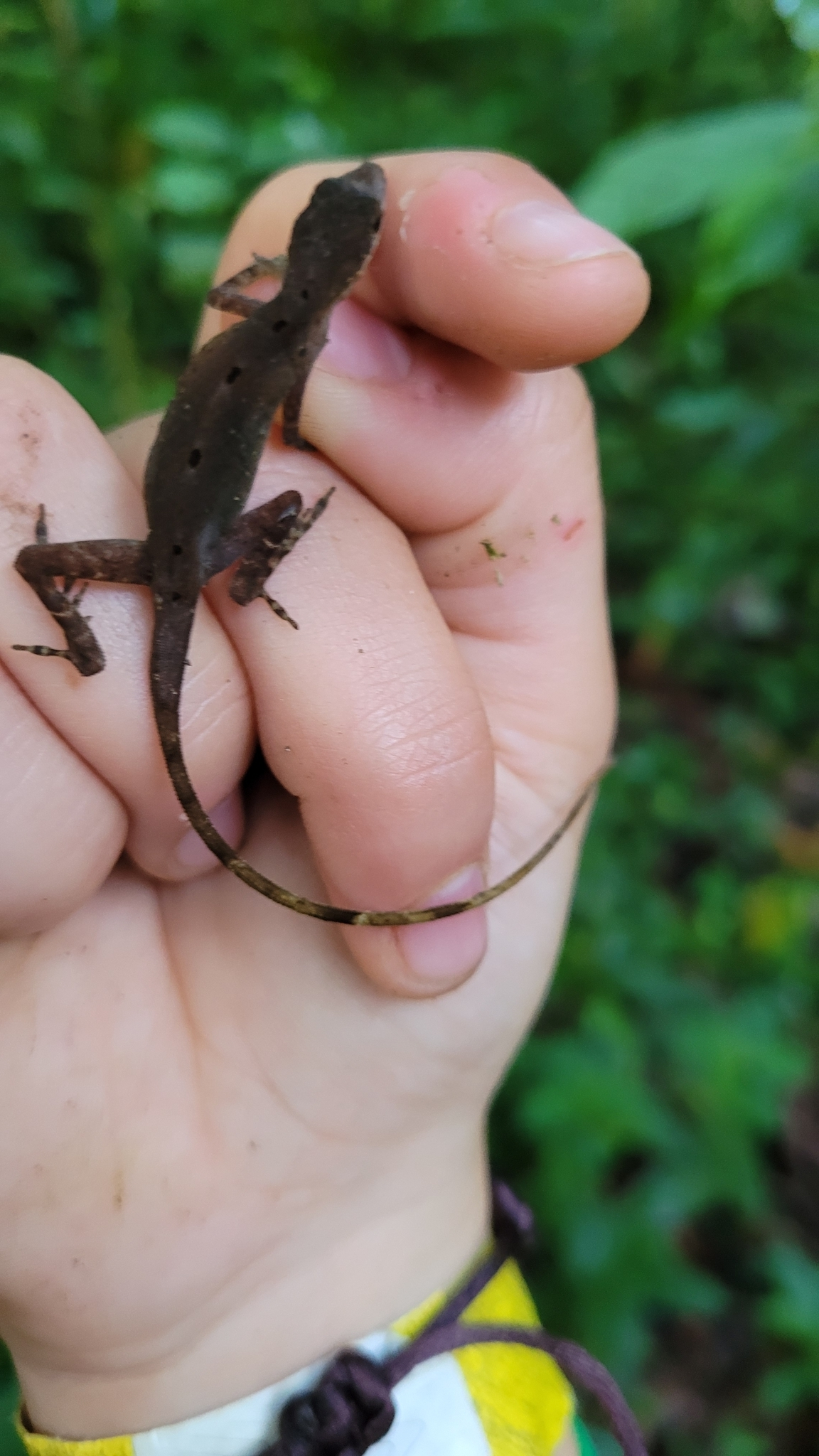

Conservation status
- Vulnerable (IUCN 3.1)

Scientific classification
- Kingdom: Animalia
- Phylum: Chordata
- Class: Reptilia
- Order: Squamata
- Suborder: Iguania
- Family: Dactyloidae
- Genus: Anolis
- Species: A. zeus

Binomial name
- Anolis zeus (Köhler & McCranie, 2001)

Synonyms
- Norops zeus Köhler & McCranie, 2001

= Anolis zeus =

Species of lizard

Anolis zeus is a species of lizard in the family Dactyloidae. The species is found in Honduras.
