= Anolis leucodera =

Scientific classification
- Kingdom: Animalia
- Phylum: Chordata
- Class: Reptilia
- Order: Squamata
- Suborder: Iguania
- Family: Dactyloidae
- Genus: Anolis
- Species: A. leucodera

Binomial name
- Anolis leucodera Köhler & Hedges, 2016

Species of lizard

Anolis leucodera, the Bombardopolis green anole, is a species of lizard in the family Dactyloidae. The species is found in Haiti.
