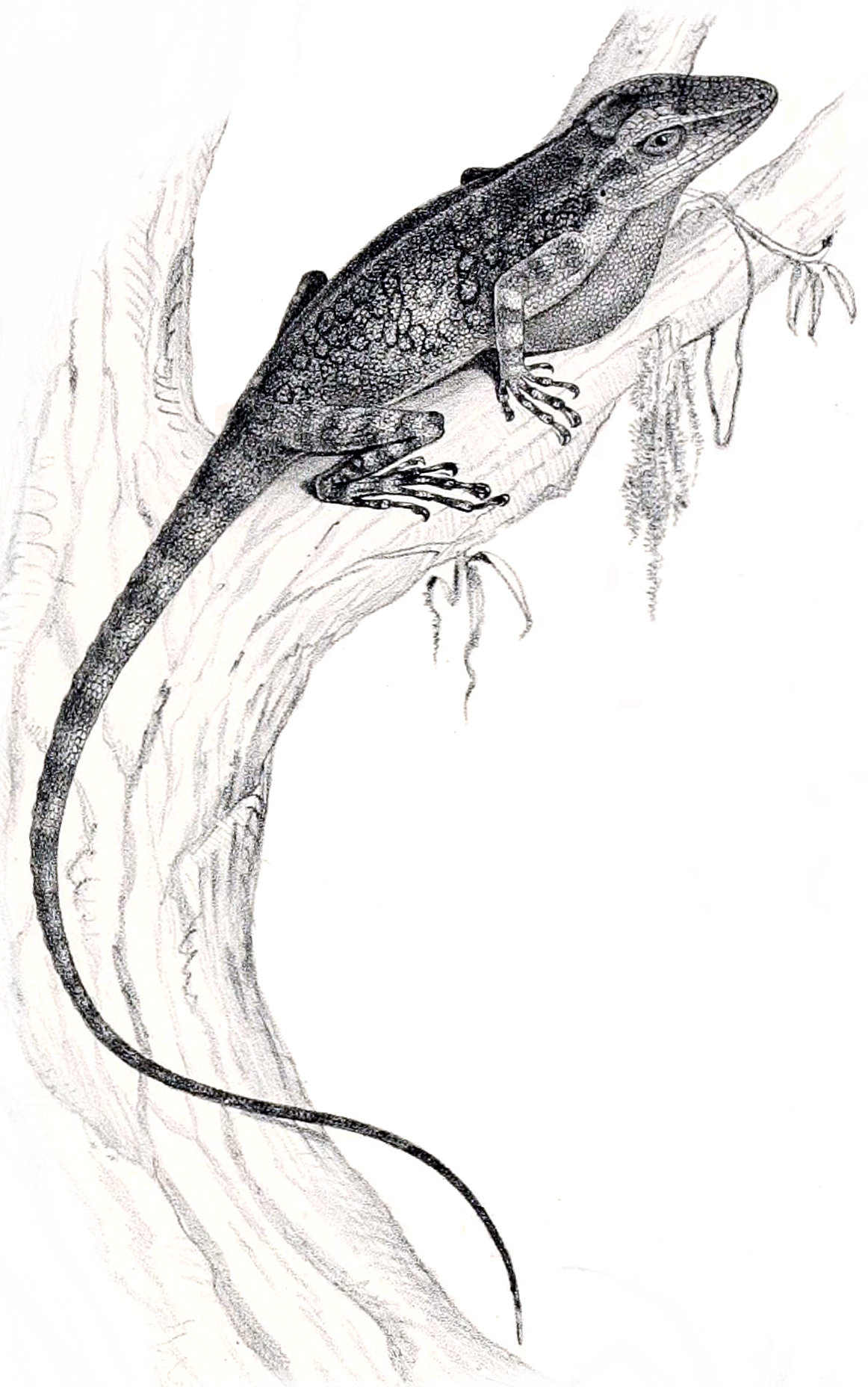

Conservation status
- Least Concern (IUCN 3.1)

Scientific classification
- Kingdom: Animalia
- Phylum: Chordata
- Class: Reptilia
- Order: Squamata
- Suborder: Iguania
- Family: Dactyloidae
- Genus: Anolis
- Species: A. microtus

Binomial name
- Anolis microtus Cope, 1871

Synonyms
- Dactyloa microtus (Cope, 1871)

= Anolis microtus =

Species of lizard

Anolis microtus, also commonly known as tiny anole or the banded giant canopy anole, is a species of lizard in the family Dactyloidae. The species is found in Costa Rica and Panama. Several Panamanian populations previously referred to as Anolis microtus are now referred to as Anolis ginaelisae.
