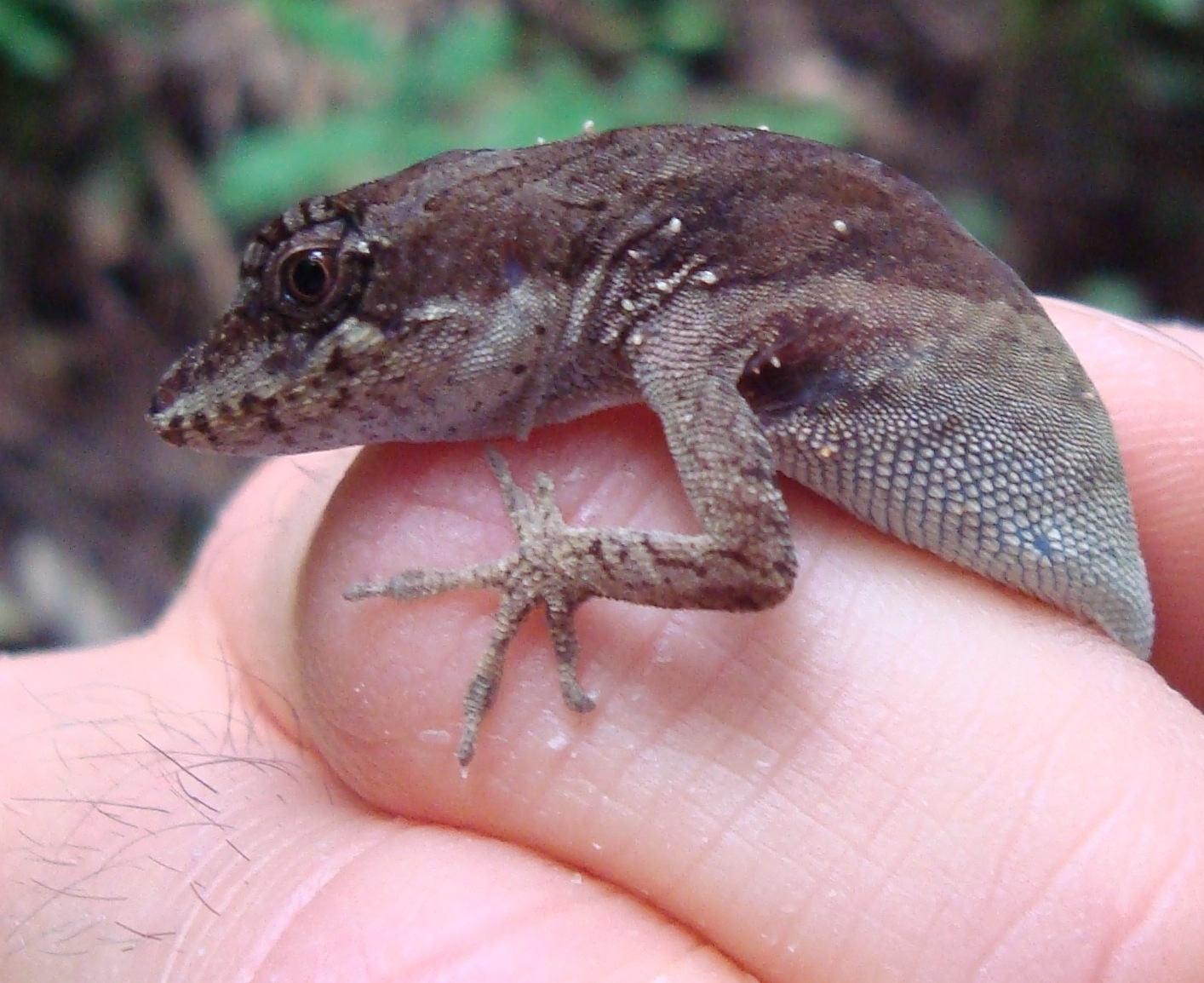

Scientific classification
- Kingdom: Animalia
- Phylum: Chordata
- Class: Reptilia
- Order: Squamata
- Suborder: Iguania
- Family: Dactyloidae
- Genus: Anolis
- Species: A. roatanensis

Binomial name
- Anolis roatanensis (Köhler & McCranie, 2001)

= Anolis roatanensis =

Species of lizard

Anolis roatanensis, the Roatan anole, is a species of lizard in the family Dactyloidae. The species is found in Honduras.
