= Anolis peucephilus =

Scientific classification
- Kingdom: Animalia
- Phylum: Chordata
- Class: Reptilia
- Order: Squamata
- Suborder: Iguania
- Family: Dactyloidae
- Genus: Anolis
- Species: A. peucephilus

Binomial name
- Anolis peucephilus Köhler, Trejo-Perez, Petersen, & Mendez De La Cruz, 2014

Species of lizard

Anolis peucephilus is a species of lizard in the family Dactyloidae. The species is found in Mexico.
