= Anolis wermuthi =

Conservation status
- Endangered (IUCN 3.1)

Scientific classification
- Kingdom: Animalia
- Phylum: Chordata
- Class: Reptilia
- Order: Squamata
- Suborder: Iguania
- Family: Dactyloidae
- Genus: Anolis
- Species: A. wermuthi

Binomial name
- Anolis wermuthi (Köhler & Obermeier, 1998)

Species of lizard

Anolis wermuthi, Wermuth's anole, is a species of lizard in the family Dactyloidae. The species is found in Nicaragua and Honduras.
