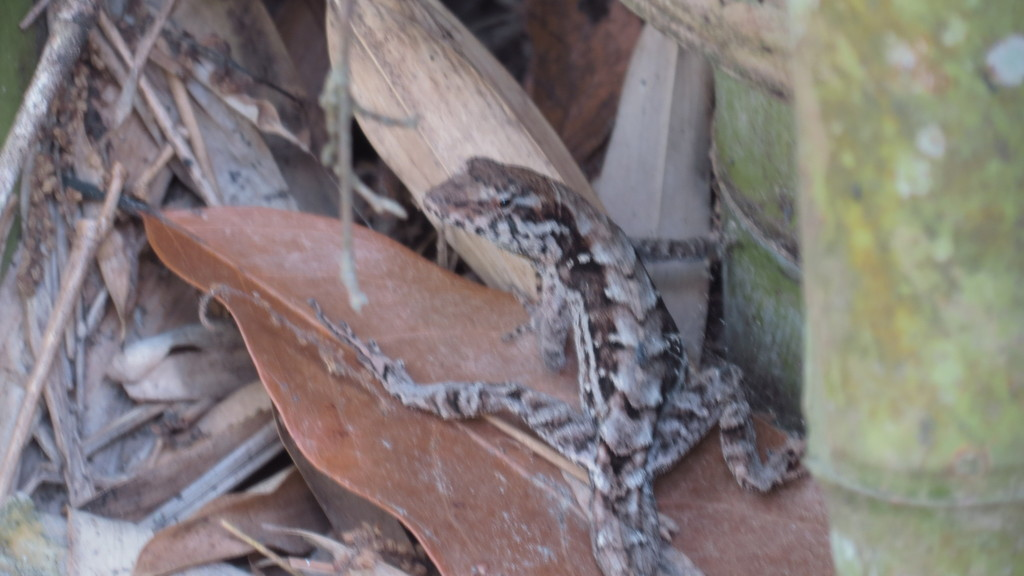

Scientific classification
- Kingdom: Animalia
- Phylum: Chordata
- Class: Reptilia
- Order: Squamata
- Suborder: Iguania
- Family: Anolidae
- Genus: Anolis
- Species: A. mccraniei

Binomial name
- Anolis mccraniei (Köhler, Townsend, & Petersen, 2016)

= Anolis mccraniei =

Species of lizard

Anolis mccraniei is a species of lizard in the family Dactyloidae. The species is found in Honduras.
