= Anolis triumphalis =

Scientific classification
- Kingdom: Animalia
- Phylum: Chordata
- Class: Reptilia
- Order: Squamata
- Suborder: Iguania
- Family: Dactyloidae
- Genus: Anolis
- Species: A. triumphalis

Binomial name
- Anolis triumphalis (Nicholson & Köhler, 2014)

Synonyms
- Norops triumphalis Nicholson & Köhler, 2014

Species of lizard

Anolis triumphalis is a species of lizard in the family Dactyloidae. The species is known with confidence only from its holotype collected in Darién, Panama, although there is an unconfirmed sighting also from Colombia.

The holotype is a male measuring 54.5 mm (2.1 in) in snout–vent length. It was caught while it was racing across a road in an open pasture area at 128 m (420 ft) above sea level.
