= Euspondylus nellycarrillae =

Conservation status
- Data Deficient (IUCN 3.1)

Scientific classification
- Kingdom: Animalia
- Phylum: Chordata
- Class: Reptilia
- Order: Squamata
- Family: Gymnophthalmidae
- Genus: Euspondylus
- Species: E. nellycarrillae

Binomial name
- Euspondylus nellycarrillae G. Köhler & Lehr, 2004

Species of lizard

Euspondylus nellycarrillae is a species of lizard in the subfamily Cercosaurinae of the family Gymnophthalmidae. The species is endemic to Peru.

== Etymology ==
The specific name, nellycarrillae, is in honor of Peruvian herpetologist Nelly Carrillo de Espinoza.

== Geographic distribution ==
Euspondylus nellycarrillae is found in Huánuco Region, Peru.

== Habitat ==
The preferred natural habitat of Euspondylus nellycarrillae is forest, at elevations of 2,480–3,100 m (8,140–10,170 ft).

== Reproduction ==
Euspondylus nellycarrillae is oviparous.
