= Andean tapaculo =

The Andean tapaculo (Scytalopus magellanicus) was a species of South American bird belonging to the tapaculo group. It has now been split into several species, three of which are sometimes known as Andean tapaculo:

- Magellanic tapaculo, Scytalopus magellanicus
- Puna tapaculo, Scytalopus simonsi
- Pale-bellied tapaculo, Scytalopus griseicollis
