= Anolis datzorum =

Conservation status
- Endangered (IUCN 3.1)

Scientific classification
- Kingdom: Animalia
- Phylum: Chordata
- Class: Reptilia
- Order: Squamata
- Suborder: Iguania
- Family: Anolidae
- Genus: Anolis
- Species: A. datzorum

Binomial name
- Anolis datzorum G. Köhler, Ponce, Sunyer & Batista, 2007

Species of lizard

Anolis datzorum is a species of lizard in the family Dactyloidae. The species is native to Central America.

== Etymology ==
The specific name, datzorum (genitive plural), is in honor of German philanthropists Erika Datz and her brother Walter Datz for their support of biodiversity research.

== Geographic range ==
A. datzorum is found in Costa Rica and Panama.

== Habitat ==
The preferred natural habitat of A. datzorum is forest, at altitudes of 1,600–2,400 m (5,250–7,870 ft).

== Description ==
Medium-sized for its genus, A. datzorum may attain a snout-to-vent length (SVL) of about 5 cm (2.0 in). It has relatively short back legs, no enlarged middorsal scales, keeled ventral scales at midbody, a white to yellowish dewlap in males, and an overall greenish coloration.

== Behavior ==
A. datzorum is terrestrial and semiarboreal.

== Reproduction ==
A. datzorum is oviparous.
