= Euspondylus caideni =

Conservation status
- Least Concern (IUCN 3.1)

Scientific classification
- Kingdom: Animalia
- Phylum: Chordata
- Class: Reptilia
- Order: Squamata
- Family: Gymnophthalmidae
- Genus: Euspondylus
- Species: E. caideni

Binomial name
- Euspondylus caideni G. Köhler, 2003

Species of lizard

Euspondylus caideni is a species of lizard in the family Gymnophthalmidae. The species is endemic to Peru.

== Etymology ==
The specific name, caideni, is in honor of Caiden Christopher Vlasimsky (born 2003), the son of a Texan supporter of BIOPAT – Patrons for Biodiversity.

== Geographic range ==
E. caideni is found in Department of Cuzco, Peru.

== Habitat ==
The preferred natural habitat of E. caideni is forest, at altitudes of 2,780–2,850 m (9,120–9,350 ft).

== Reproduction ==
E. caideni is oviparous.
