= Anolis zapotecorum =

Scientific classification
- Domain: Eukaryota
- Kingdom: Animalia
- Phylum: Chordata
- Class: Reptilia
- Order: Squamata
- Suborder: Iguania
- Family: Dactyloidae
- Genus: Anolis
- Species: A. zapotecorum

Binomial name
- Anolis zapotecorum Köhler et al., 2014

Species of lizard

Anolis zapotecorum is a species of anole lizard first found in the Mexican states of Oaxaca, Guerrero, and Puebla. The species has keeled ventral scales.
