= Anolis arenal =

Scientific classification
- Kingdom: Animalia
- Phylum: Chordata
- Class: Reptilia
- Order: Squamata
- Suborder: Iguania
- Family: Dactyloidae
- Genus: Anolis
- Species: A. arenal

Binomial name
- Anolis arenal (Köhler & Vargas, 2019)

Species of lizard

Anolis arenal is a species of lizard in the family Dactyloidae. The species is found in Costa Rica.
