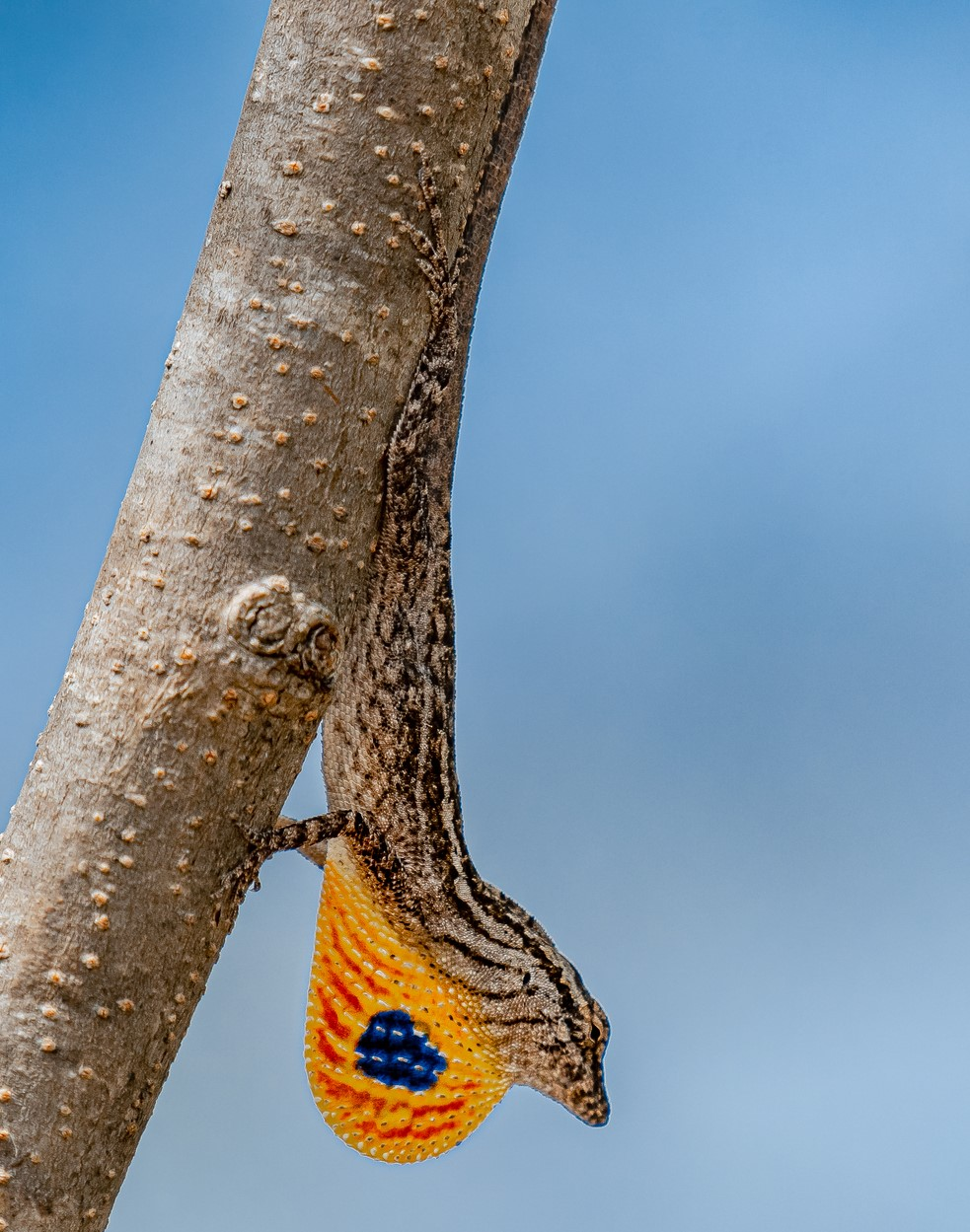

Conservation status
- Least Concern (IUCN 3.1)

Scientific classification
- Kingdom: Animalia
- Phylum: Chordata
- Class: Reptilia
- Order: Squamata
- Suborder: Iguania
- Family: Dactyloidae
- Genus: Anolis
- Species: A. unilobatus

Binomial name
- Anolis unilobatus Köhler & Vesely, 2010

= Anolis unilobatus =

Species of lizard

Anolis unilobatus, the blue-spotted fan anole, is a species of lizard in the family Dactyloidae. The species is found in Costa Rica, Nicaragua, Honduras, Guatemala, and Mexico.
