= Anolis benedikti =

Conservation status
- Endangered (IUCN 3.1)

Scientific classification
- Kingdom: Animalia
- Phylum: Chordata
- Class: Reptilia
- Order: Squamata
- Suborder: Iguania
- Family: Dactyloidae
- Genus: Anolis
- Species: A. benedikti

Binomial name
- Anolis benedikti Lotzkat, Bienentreu, Hertz, & Köhler, 2011

Species of lizard

Anolis benedikti is a species of lizard in the family Dactyloidae. The species is found in Panama and Costa Rica.
