= Anolis yoroensis =

Conservation status
- Endangered (IUCN 3.1)

Scientific classification
- Kingdom: Animalia
- Phylum: Chordata
- Class: Reptilia
- Order: Squamata
- Suborder: Iguania
- Family: Dactyloidae
- Genus: Anolis
- Species: A. yoroensis

Binomial name
- Anolis yoroensis (McCranie, Nicholson, & Köhler, 2001)

Species of lizard

Anolis yoroensis is a species of lizard in the family Dactyloidae. The species is found in Honduras.
