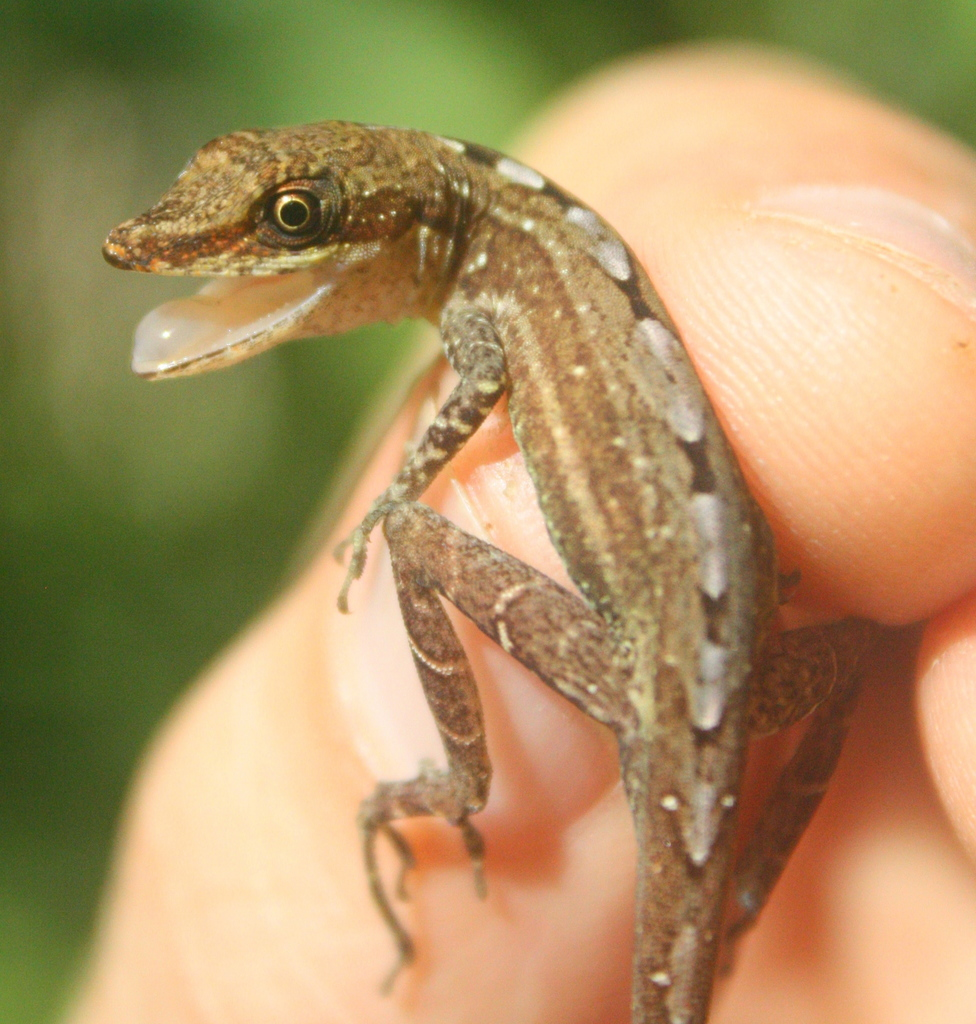

Conservation status
- Least Concern (IUCN 3.1)

Scientific classification
- Kingdom: Animalia
- Phylum: Chordata
- Class: Reptilia
- Order: Squamata
- Suborder: Iguania
- Family: Dactyloidae
- Genus: Anolis
- Species: A. cryptolimifrons

Binomial name
- Anolis cryptolimifrons Köhler & Sunyer, 2008

= Anolis cryptolimifrons =

Species of lizard

Anolis cryptolimifrons is a species of lizard in the family Dactyloidae. The species is found on in Costa Rica and Panama.
