= Hemidactylus nicolauensis =

Scientific classification
- Domain: Eukaryota
- Kingdom: Animalia
- Phylum: Chordata
- Class: Reptilia
- Order: Squamata
- Infraorder: Gekkota
- Family: Gekkonidae
- Genus: Hemidactylus
- Species: H. nicolauensis

Binomial name
- Hemidactylus nicolauensis Vasconcelos, Köhler, Geniez, & Crochet, 2020

Species of lizard

Hemidactylus nicolauensis is a species of house gecko. It is endemic to the Cape Verde Islands.

== Etymology ==
The specific name nicolauensis refers to São Nicolau, the island in which the species was found.
