= Anolis alocomyos =

Scientific classification
- Kingdom: Animalia
- Phylum: Chordata
- Class: Reptilia
- Order: Squamata
- Suborder: Iguania
- Family: Dactyloidae
- Genus: Anolis
- Species: A. alocomyos

Binomial name
- Anolis alocomyos (Köhler, Vargas, & Lotzkat, 2014)

Species of lizard

Anolis alocomyos, the Copey anole, is a species of lizard in the family Dactyloidae. The species is found in Costa Rica.
