= Anolis maia =

Scientific classification
- Kingdom: Animalia
- Phylum: Chordata
- Class: Reptilia
- Order: Squamata
- Suborder: Iguania
- Family: Anolidae
- Genus: Anolis
- Species: A. maia

Binomial name
- Anolis maia (Batista, Vesely, Mebert, Lotzkat, & Köhler, 2015)

Species of lizard

Anolis maia is a species of lizard in the family Dactyloidae. The species is found in Panama.
