= Nelly Carrillo Tarazona de Espinoza =

Peruvian herpetologist

Maria Nelly Carrillo Tarazona de Espinoza (1927 – 2017) was a Peruvian herpetologist known as Nelly Carrillo de Espinoza.

== Biography ==
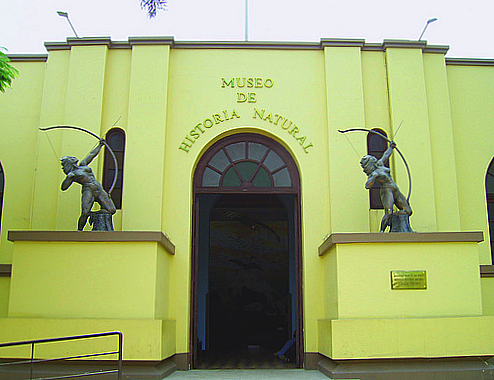
Natural History Museum at the National University of San Marcos

Nelly was born 2 November 1927 in Chiquián, Peru, to Manuel Carillo and Daria Tarazona. On 22 September 1959, in San Isidro, she married the engineer Rubén Espinoza Chávez, with whom she had two children, Rubén Dario Espinoza Carillo (born 1961) and Nelly Rosario Espinoza Carrillo (born 1962).

Nelly Carrillo Espinoza studied at the Faculty of Biology at the National University of San Marcos (UNMSM) in Lima, where she took care of the department's important scientific collection. In 1973 she received her doctorate from UNMSM with her dissertation titled A new species of the genus Sibynomorphus (Serpentes: Colubridae).

=== Career ===
After moving to work at the Natural History Museum, her supervisor was Jehan Albert Vellard, the French scientist who contributed to the development and expansion of herpetological studies at the Museum's Herpetology Laboratory of the National University. Carrillo Espinoza succeeded him in that role and continued his line of research. She remained Head of the Department of Herpetology for more than 25 years.

Carrillo Espinoza was considered generous and enjoyed sharing her knowledge with other scientists. Her handling of snakes and other reptiles was considered remarkable. During her time at the museum, it was unusual for a woman to work in this field, especially in a leading position, but despite the odds, she attracted attention in scientific circles and earned an excellent reputation. She is considered the first Peruvian herpetologist.

With co-authors Javier Icochea Monteza, Víctor Raúl Morales and Hernán Ortega, she published important descriptions and inventories of native species, which became the foundation for other experts and their research.

She died on 12 August 2017 in Lima, Peru.

=== Taxa named in honor of Carrillo Espinoza ===
Two species were named in her honor.

- Telmatobius carrillae, an Andean frog described by the Peruvian herpetologist Víctor Morales in 1988
- Euspondylus nellycarrillae, an Andean lizard described by German herpetologists Gunther Köhler and Edgar Lehr in 2004

=== Taxa described by Carrillo Espinoza ===
Carrillo Espinoza worked alone or together with Edgar Lehr and Peter Joseph Hocking to describe new species.

- William's fat-headed snake, Dipsas williamsi (Carrillo Espinoza, 1974), named after Ernest Edward Williams
- Apurimac forest snake, Drymoluber apurimacensis Lehr, Carrillo Espinoza & Hocking, 2004
