= Euspondylus guentheri =

Conservation status
- Least Concern (IUCN 3.1)

Scientific classification
- Kingdom: Animalia
- Phylum: Chordata
- Class: Reptilia
- Order: Squamata
- Family: Gymnophthalmidae
- Genus: Euspondylus
- Species: E. guentheri

Binomial name
- Euspondylus guentheri (O'Shaughnessy, 1881)

Synonyms
- Ecpleopus guentheri O'Shaughnessy, 1881; Euspondylus guentheri — Boulenger, 1885

Species of lizard

Euspondylus guentheri, commonly known as Günther's sun tegu, is a species of lizard in the family Gymnophthalmidae. The species is native to Ecuador, and has also been reported from Peru. It lives in lowland tropical and subtropical forest habitats. The specific epithet guentheri is in honour of Albert Günther, a German-born British zoologist. E. guentheri is mostly diurnal, spending time in low branches or basking on the ground. If threatened, it will run for cover.

== Distribution ==
Sources differ on the altitudinal range of E. guentheri. One source states that it is found at altitudes of 290–420 m (950–1,380 ft), and another gives a potential distribution range of 255–1,297 m (837–4,255 ft). It is found in central and eastern Ecuador, and has also been reported from Peru.

== Appearance ==
Males of E. guentheri usually grow to a total length (including tail) of 25 cm (9.8 in), while females are somewhat smaller, growing to around 23 cm (9.1 in). It is pale brown in colour (although juveniles are usually yellower), with irregular black crossbars and blotches. It resembles E. maculatus, the spotted sun tegu, but can be differentiated from that species by colour: E. maculatus has smaller and less pervasive blotches and is generally browner and more uniform in colour.

== Reproduction ==
E. guentheri is oviparous.

== Protection and rarity ==
E. guentheri is assessed as Least Concern by the IUCN, as it is not subject to significant threat or population decline, although it may be affected by local threats such as deforestation, mining, and agricultural expansion. Furthermore, the species is present in a number of protected areas.
