= Telmatobius simonsi =

Conservation status
- Critically Endangered (IUCN 3.1)

Scientific classification
- Kingdom: Animalia
- Phylum: Chordata
- Class: Amphibia
- Order: Anura
- Family: Telmatobiidae
- Genus: Telmatobius
- Species: T. simonsi

Binomial name
- Telmatobius simonsi Parker, 1940

Species of frog

Telmatobius simonsi is a species of frog in the family Telmatobiidae. It is endemic to Bolivia.

== Habitat ==
This aquatic frog lives in streams in cloud forests and Yungas forests. They have been observed on rocks and in the mud at the bottoms of streams. Scientists observed this frog between 1000 and 2800 meters above sea level in valleys between the Andes Mountains.

Scientists have seen this frog in some protected parks: Parque Nacional El Palmar and Parque Nacional Amboró.

== Etymology ==
It was named for American scientific collector Perry O. Simons.

== Threats ==
The IUCN classifies this frog as critically endangered. There was a significant dieoff in recent years. Scientists believe the fungus Batrachochytrium dendrobatidis killed the frogs by giving them the fungal disease chytridiomycosis, which has killed many stream-dwelling amphibians in South America. Habitat loss in favor of agriculture and logging are also threats. Water pollution and livestock grazing near the streams can also kill these frogs.
