= Euspondylus auyanensis =

Conservation status
- Least Concern (IUCN 3.1)

Scientific classification
- Kingdom: Animalia
- Phylum: Chordata
- Class: Reptilia
- Order: Squamata
- Family: Gymnophthalmidae
- Genus: Euspondylus
- Species: E. auyanensis

Binomial name
- Euspondylus auyanensis Myers, G. Rivas & Jadin, 2009

Species of lizard

Euspondylus auyanensis is a species of lizard in the family Gymnophthalmidae. It is endemic to Venezuela.
