= Astroblepus simonsii =

Conservation status
- Least Concern (IUCN 3.1)

Scientific classification
- Kingdom: Animalia
- Phylum: Chordata
- Class: Actinopterygii
- Order: Siluriformes
- Family: Astroblepidae
- Genus: Astroblepus
- Species: A. simonsii

Binomial name
- Astroblepus simonsii (Regan, 1904)

Synonyms
- Arges simonsii Regan, 1904

Species of fish

Astroblepus simonsii is a species of freshwater ray-finned fish belonging to the family Astroblepidae, the climbing catfishes. This catfish is found in the Pacific slope drainages of Ecuador and Peru. This species attains a maximum standard length of 8 cm (3.1 in).

The specific name honors the American natural history collector in South America, Perry O. Simons, who collected the holotype. Later his guide murdered him while crossing the Andes of Argentina, presumably for his money and gear.

== Bibliography ==
- Eschmeyer, William N., ed. 1998. Catalog of Fishes. Special Publication of the Center for Biodiversity Research and Information, num. 1, vol. 1–3. California Academy of Sciences. San Francisco, California, United States. 2905. ISBN 0-940228-47-5.
