= Euspondylus excelsum =

Scientific classification
- Kingdom: Animalia
- Phylum: Chordata
- Class: Reptilia
- Order: Squamata
- Family: Gymnophthalmidae
- Genus: Euspondylus
- Species: E. excelsum

Binomial name
- Euspondylus excelsum Chavez, Catenazzi, & Venegas, 2017

Species of lizard

Euspondylus excelsum is a species of lizard in the family Gymnophthalmidae. It is endemic to Peru.
