= Anolis ginaelisae =

Scientific classification
- Kingdom: Animalia
- Phylum: Chordata
- Class: Reptilia
- Order: Squamata
- Suborder: Iguania
- Family: Anolidae
- Genus: Anolis
- Species: A. ginaelisae

Binomial name
- Anolis ginaelisae (Lotzkat, Bienentreu, Hertz, & G. Köhler, 2013)

Species of lizard

Anolis ginaelisae is a species of lizard in the family Dactyloidae. The species is found in Panama.
