= Euspondylus acutirostris =

Conservation status
- Least Concern (IUCN 3.1)

Scientific classification
- Kingdom: Animalia
- Phylum: Chordata
- Class: Reptilia
- Order: Squamata
- Family: Gymnophthalmidae
- Genus: Euspondylus
- Species: E. acutirostris

Binomial name
- Euspondylus acutirostris (Peters, 1863)

Species of lizard

Euspondylus acutirostris, the sharp-snouted sun tegu, is a species of lizard in the family Gymnophthalmidae. It is endemic to Venezuela.
