= Anolis apletolepis =

Scientific classification
- Kingdom: Animalia
- Phylum: Chordata
- Class: Reptilia
- Order: Squamata
- Suborder: Iguania
- Family: Dactyloidae
- Genus: Anolis
- Species: A. apletolepis

Binomial name
- Anolis apletolepis Köhler & Hedges, 2016

Species of lizard

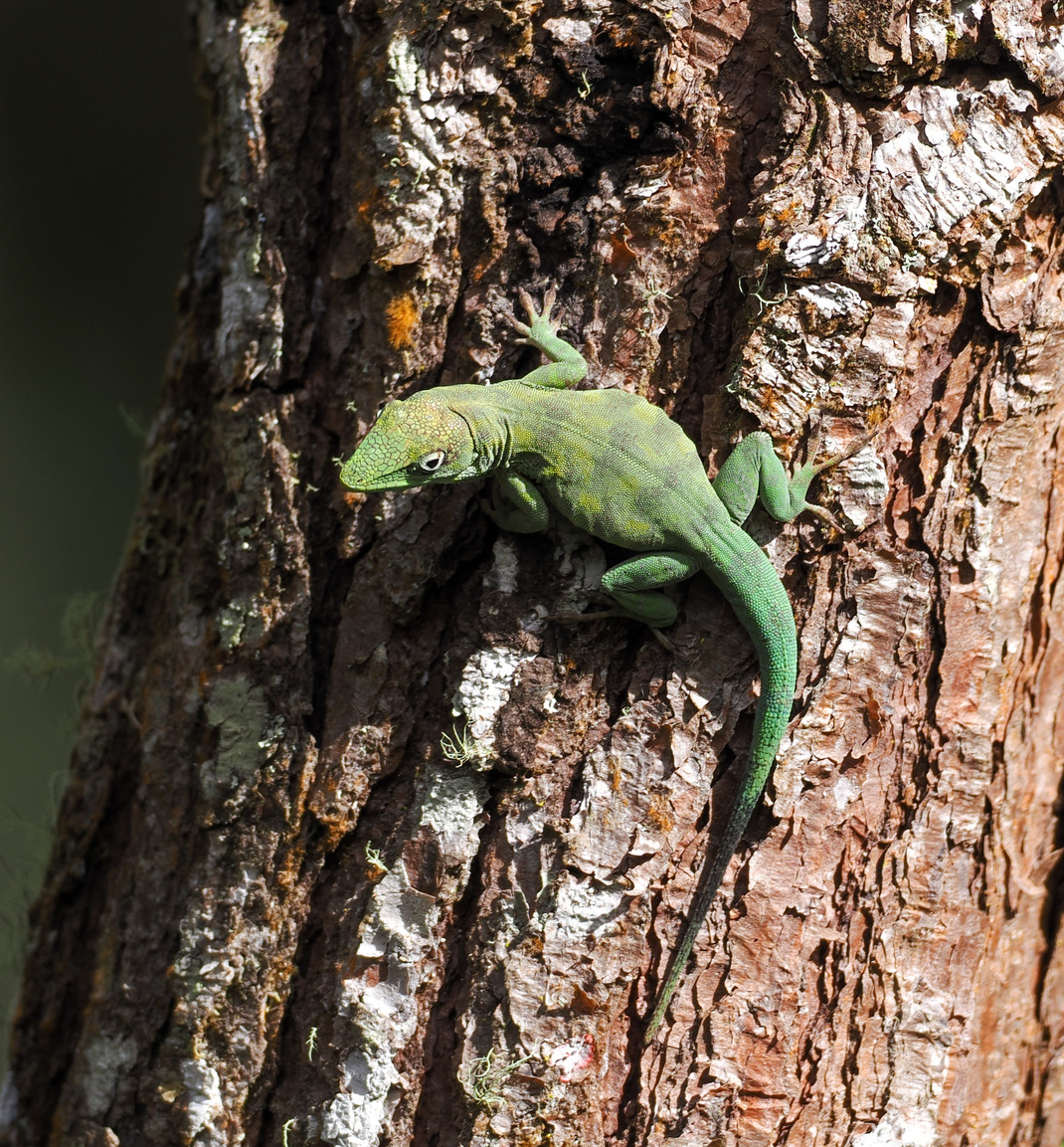
Anolis apletolepis spotted at Duverge, Dominican Republic

Anolis apletolepis, the La Selle twig anole, is a species of lizard in the family Dactyloidae. The species is found in Hispaniola.
