= Euspondylus paxcorpus =

Scientific classification
- Kingdom: Animalia
- Phylum: Chordata
- Class: Reptilia
- Order: Squamata
- Family: Gymnophthalmidae
- Genus: Euspondylus
- Species: E. paxcorpus

Binomial name
- Euspondylus paxcorpus Doan & Adams, 2015

Species of lizard

Euspondylus paxcorpus is a species of lizard in the family Gymnophthalmidae. It is endemic to Peru.
