= Euspondylus monsfumus =

Conservation status
- Critically Endangered (IUCN 3.1)

Scientific classification
- Kingdom: Animalia
- Phylum: Chordata
- Class: Reptilia
- Order: Squamata
- Family: Gymnophthalmidae
- Genus: Euspondylus
- Species: E. monsfumus

Binomial name
- Euspondylus monsfumus Mijares-Urrutia, Señaris, & Arends, 2001

Species of lizard

Euspondylus monsfumus is a species of lizard in the family Gymnophthalmidae. It is endemic to Venezuela.
