= Euspondylus simonsii =

Conservation status
- Data Deficient (IUCN 3.1)

Scientific classification
- Kingdom: Animalia
- Phylum: Chordata
- Class: Reptilia
- Order: Squamata
- Family: Gymnophthalmidae
- Genus: Euspondylus
- Species: E. simonsii

Binomial name
- Euspondylus simonsii Boulenger, 1901

Species of lizard

Euspondylus simonsii, known commonly as Simons's sun tegu, is a species of lizard in the family Gymnophthalmidae. The species is endemic to Peru.

== Etymology ==
The specific name, simonsii, is in honor of American scientific collector Perry O. Simons.

== Geographic range ==
E. simonsii is found in the Department of Huánuco, Peru.

== Habitat ==
The preferred natural habitat of E. simonsii is at altitudes of 1,250–1,560 m (4,100–5,120 ft).

== Reproduction ==
E. simonsii is oviparous.
