= Dipsas williamsi =

Conservation status
- Vulnerable (IUCN 3.1)

Scientific classification
- Kingdom: Animalia
- Phylum: Chordata
- Class: Reptilia
- Order: Squamata
- Suborder: Serpentes
- Family: Colubridae
- Genus: Dipsas
- Species: D. williamsi

Binomial name
- Dipsas williamsi (Carrillo de Espinoza, 1974)

Species of snake

Dipsas williamsi, also known commonly as Williams's tree snake, is a species of nonvenomous snake in the subfamily Dipsadinae of the family Colubridae. The species is endemic to Peru. It was named in honor of Ernest Edward Williams by Nelly Carrillo de Espinoza (1974).

== Original publication ==
- Carrillo de Espinoza N (1974). "Sibynomorphus williamsi nov. sp. (Serpentes: Colubridae)". Publicaciones del Museo de Historia Natural "Javier Prado", Serie A (Zoología) (24): 1–16. (Sibynomorphus wiiliamsi, new species). (in Spanish).
