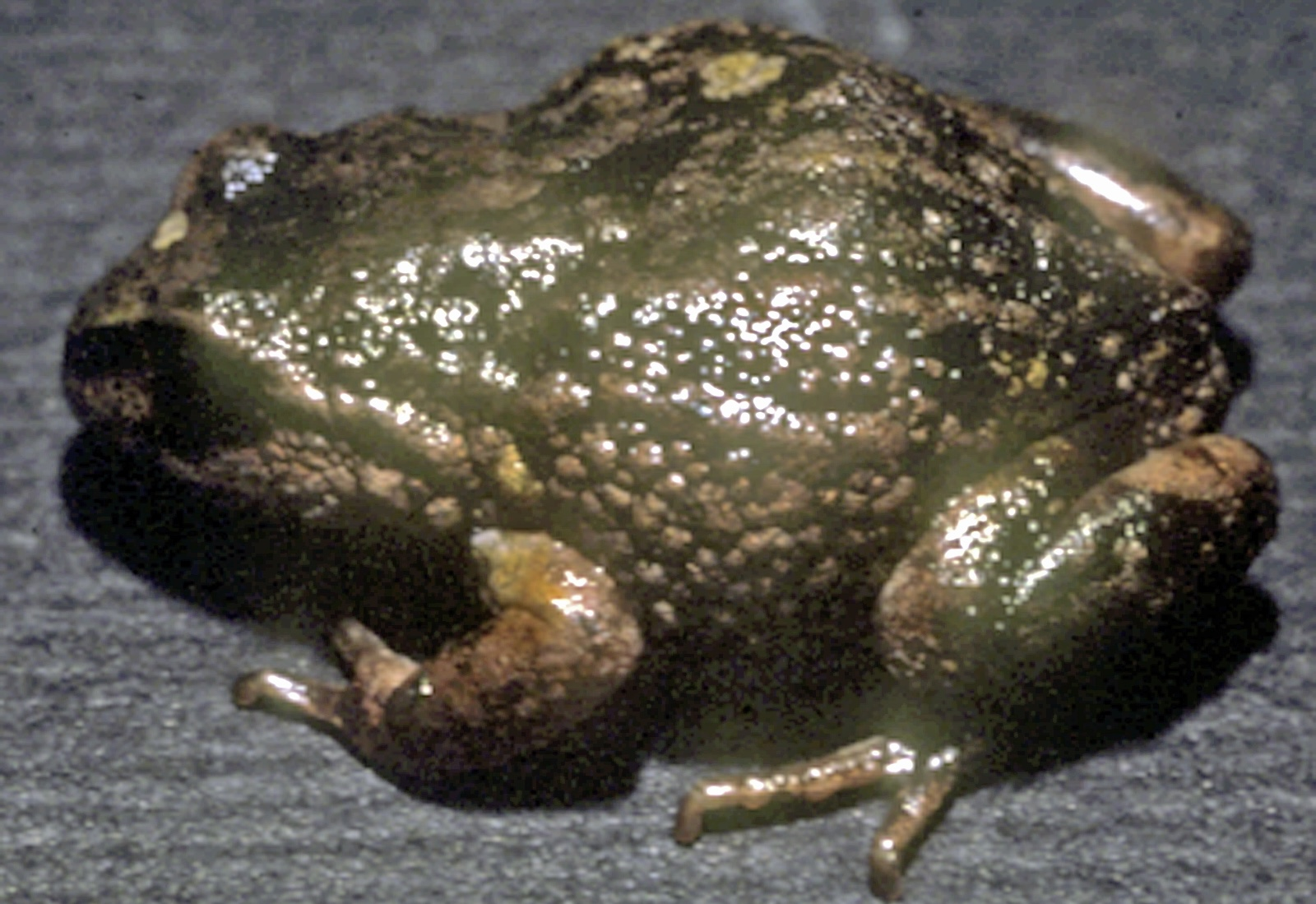

Conservation status
- Vulnerable (IUCN 3.1)

Scientific classification
- Kingdom: Animalia
- Phylum: Chordata
- Class: Amphibia
- Order: Anura
- Family: Strabomantidae
- Genus: Pristimantis
- Species: P. simonsii

Binomial name
- Pristimantis simonsii (Boulenger, 1900)

Synonyms
- Paludicola simonsii Boulenger, 1900; Syrrhopus simonsii (Boulenger, 1900); Niceforonia simonsii (Boulenger, 1900); Phrynopus simonsii (Boulenger, 1900); Eleutherodactylus simonsii (Boulenger, 1900)

= Pristimantis simonsii =

Species of frog

Pristimantis simonsii is a species of frog in the family Strabomantidae. It is endemic to Peru and known from humid puna grassland in the northern part of the Cordillera Occidental in the Cajamarca Region, at elevations of 3,050–3,760 m (10,010–12,340 ft) asl. Its natural habitat is páramo or puna grassland. It is threatened by habitat loss caused by agricultural expansion. It was named for American scientific collector Perry O. Simons.

== Description ==
The oval tongue ovalis entire. Vomerine teeth none. Snout rounded, as long as the diameter of the orbit j canthus rostralis distinct; nostril a little nearer the tip of the snout than the eye; interorbital space as broad as the upper eyelid; no tympanum; no eustachian tubes. Fingers and toes moderate, slightly swollen at the end; first finger not extending as far as second; toes free; subarticular tubercles moderate; two rather large, feebly prominent metatarsal tubercles. The tibio-tarsal articulation reaches the angle of the jaws. The upper parts with porous smooth warts, some of which are confluent into longitudinal folds on the body; the throat, belly, and lower surface of thighs coarsely granulate.

Olive-brown above, whitish beneath; a dark brown canthal and temporal streak; a blackish band in the groin, another on the inner side of the femoro-tibial articulation, and a third on the outer side of the tibio-tarsal articulation; a few blackish spots on the sides.
