= Perry O. Simons =

American scientific collector

Perry Oveitt Simons (October 6, 1869 – 1901) was an American scientific collector. He predominantly worked in the Neotropics.

== Early life and education ==
Simons was born on October 6, 1869, in Mineral Point, Wisconsin, the son of Luther B. Simons (1836–1917) and Laura Simona (née Hollingsworth, later Harreld, 1851–1931). In 1886 he left Wisconsin for Riverside, California, where he graduated from Riverside High School in 1893. He spent four years at Stanford University as an electrical engineering major.

While at Stanford, he assisted William W. Price with a scientific collecting expedition near Lake Tahoe, California in the summer of 1896. He collected bird and mammal specimens that were deposited in a number of museums around the United States, including the Harvard Museum of Comparative Zoology, American Museum of Natural History, and the California Academy of Sciences.

== Career ==
Later, he accompanied William W. Price as a scientific collector in Mexico from 1896 to 1897. He was joined by his brother, Luther. The mammal specimens collected on this 10-month expedition were purchased by the British Museum. British Museum zoologist Oldfield Thomas was so pleased by the quality of the specimens, he offered Simons a job collecting additional specimens in South America. Luther accompanied Perry for the first two years of the expedition before sailing back to San Francisco.

== Death ==
While crossing the Argentinean Andes around the end of December 1901, Simons was murdered by his guide. The guide struck him in the back of the head before driving a spike through his forehead. His body was found, and it was buried nearby. The motive was said to be robbery, and the guide was captured and imprisoned in Mendoza, Argentina. After Simons's death, Oldfield Thomas called him "the most successful mammal collector that I have ever had to deal with", noting, "we shall not easily find his like again".

== Namesake species ==
Several species were named after Simons:

Reptiles:

- Simons's whorltail iguana (Stenocercus simonsii)
- Simons's green racer (Philodryas simonsi)
- Simons's sun tegu (Euspondylus simonsii)

Amphibians:

- Paramo robber frog (Pristimantis simonsii)
- Sucre water frog (Telmatobius simonsi)

Birds:

- Puna tapaculo (Scytalopus simonsi)

Mammals:

- Simons's spiny rat (Proechimys simonsi)

Fish:

- Astroblepus simonsii

Another species of reptile in the genus Liolaemus was named L. simonsi after him, though it was found to be a synonym of L. ornatus. The mountain degu was also named after him by Oldfield Thomas in 1902, as Neoctodon simonsi, but the name was later found to be invalid.
