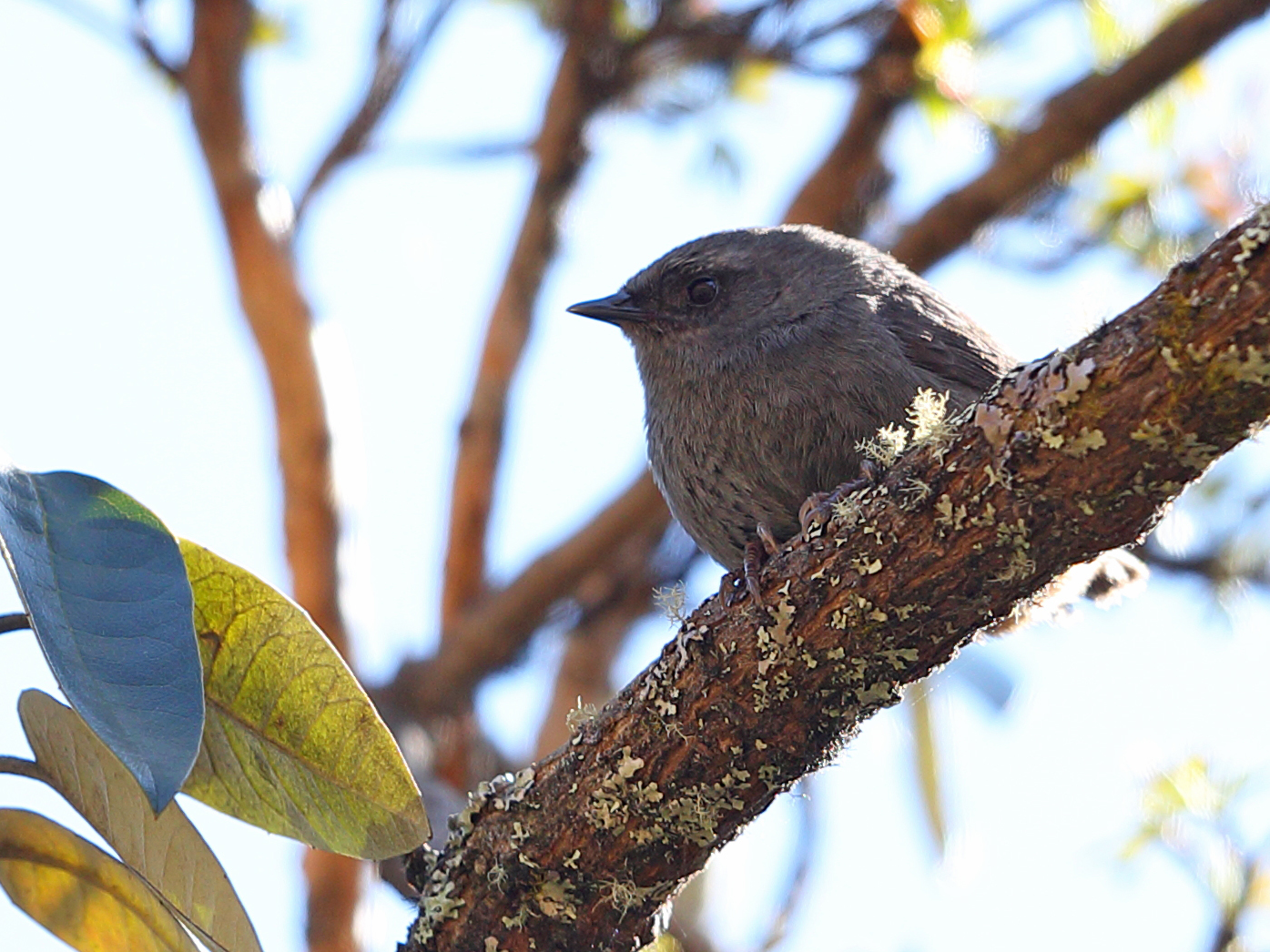

Conservation status
- Least Concern (IUCN 3.1)

Scientific classification
- Kingdom: Animalia
- Phylum: Chordata
- Class: Aves
- Order: Passeriformes
- Family: Rhinocryptidae
- Genus: Scytalopus
- Species: S. simonsi

Binomial name
- Scytalopus simonsi Chubb, 1917

= Puna tapaculo =

Species of bird

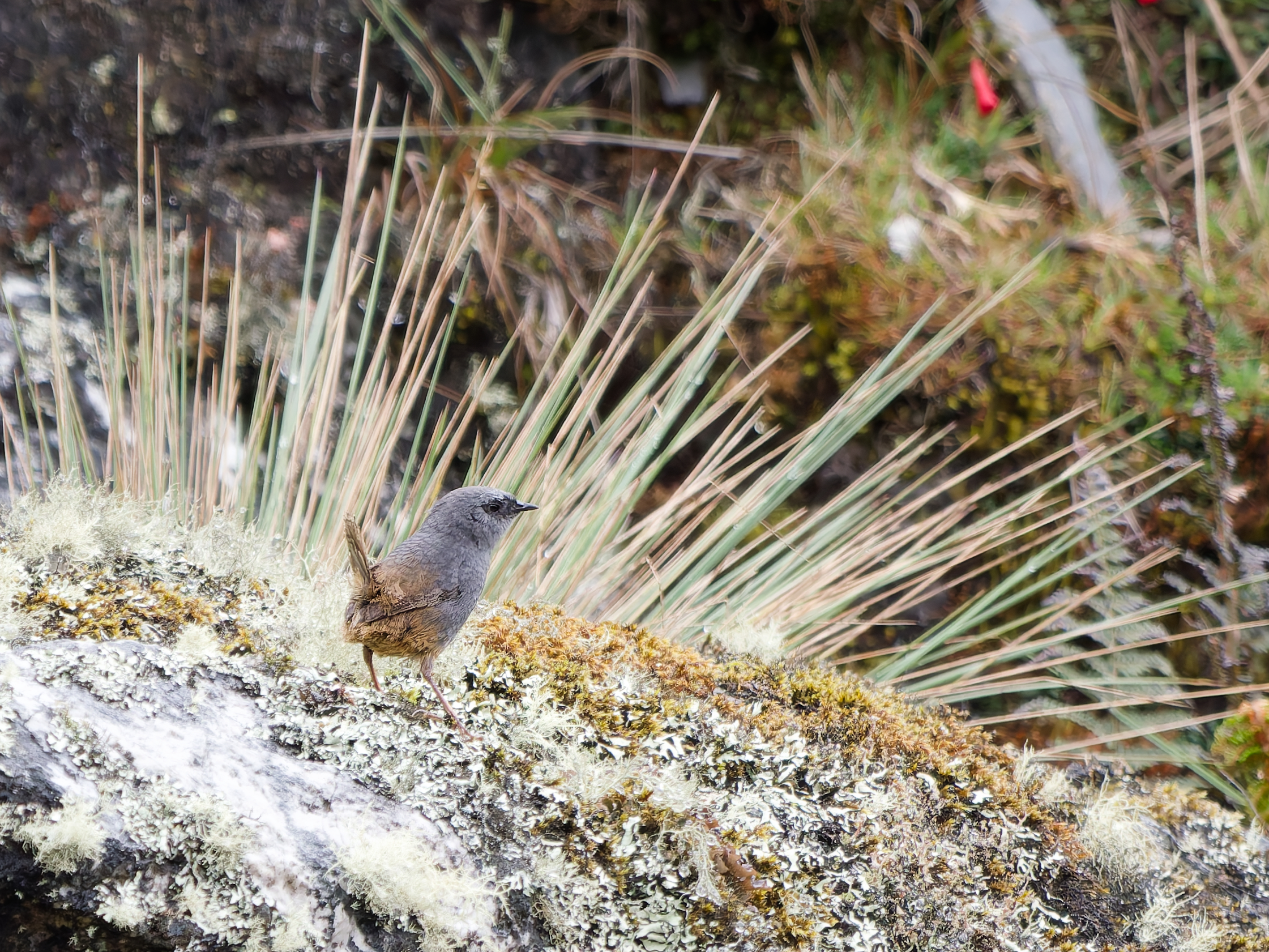
Puna Tapaculo

The puna tapaculo (Scytalopus simonsi) is a species of bird in the family Rhinocryptidae. It is found in Bolivia and Peru.

== Taxonomy and systematics ==
What is now known as the puna tapaculo was originally described as a species in 1917. It was later treated as synonymous with Tschudi's tapaculo (Scytalopus acutirostris). Still later it was treated as Scytalopus magellanicus simonsi, a subspecies of Magellanic tapaculo. Following a study published in 1997, it was elevated to species rank because of differences in their vocalizations. Its English name honors American scientific collector Perry O. Simons.

== Description ==
The puna tapaculo is 10 to 12 cm (3.9 to 4.7 in) long. Three males weighed 15.7 to 20 g (0.55 to 0.71 oz) and a female 15.7 g (0.55 oz). The adult male's upper parts are gray, often washed with brown on the neck and back. It has a narrow pale supercilium. The throat and breast are also gray. The rump, flanks, and belly can be cinnamon or olive-buff and have dark bars. The adult female is similar to the males that have the brown wash; otherwise they may be paler. Immatures are paler overall but have a heavier brown wash on the upper parts. The entire underside is barred.

== Distribution and habitat ==
The puna tapaculo is found on the eastern slope of the Andes at elevations of 2,900 to 4,300 m (9,500 to 14,100 ft) from Cordillera Vilcanota in Peru's Department of Cuzco southeast to Bolivia's Cochabamba Department. It inhabits elfin forest at tree line and above there is in small shrubs and trees among grass tussocks. It can also be found in Polylepis woodlands.

== Behavior ==
=== Feeding ===
Though very little is known about the puna tapaculo's diet, the species is probably insectivorous though seeds are also eaten.

=== Breeding ===
Very little is also known about the puna tapaculo's breeding phenology. One nest has been described; it was a cup lined with grass, placed at the end of a burrow approximately 1 m (3.3 ft) deep. It had a dome of loosely woven grass over it and contained two eggs. After hatching, both adults provisioned the nestlings.

=== Vocalization ===
The song of the puna tapaculo was described by D.L. Lane as "a series of descending churred phrases: tcherr tcherr tcherr tcherr ...." . Lane described a call as "a descending whinny: djee-ee-ee-eer" .

== Status ==
The IUCN has assessed the puna tapaculo as being of Least Concern. Though it has a restricted range and its population has not been quantified, "In the short term, the puna tapaculo is little affected by human activity".
