= Euspondylus maculatus =

Scientific classification
- Domain: Eukaryota
- Kingdom: Animalia
- Phylum: Chordata
- Class: Reptilia
- Order: Squamata
- Family: Gymnophthalmidae
- Genus: Euspondylus
- Species: E. maculatus

Binomial name
- Euspondylus maculatus Tschudi, 1845

Species of lizard

Euspondylus maculatus, the spotted sun tegus, is a species of lizard in the family Gymnophthalmidae. It is found in Peru and Ecuador.
