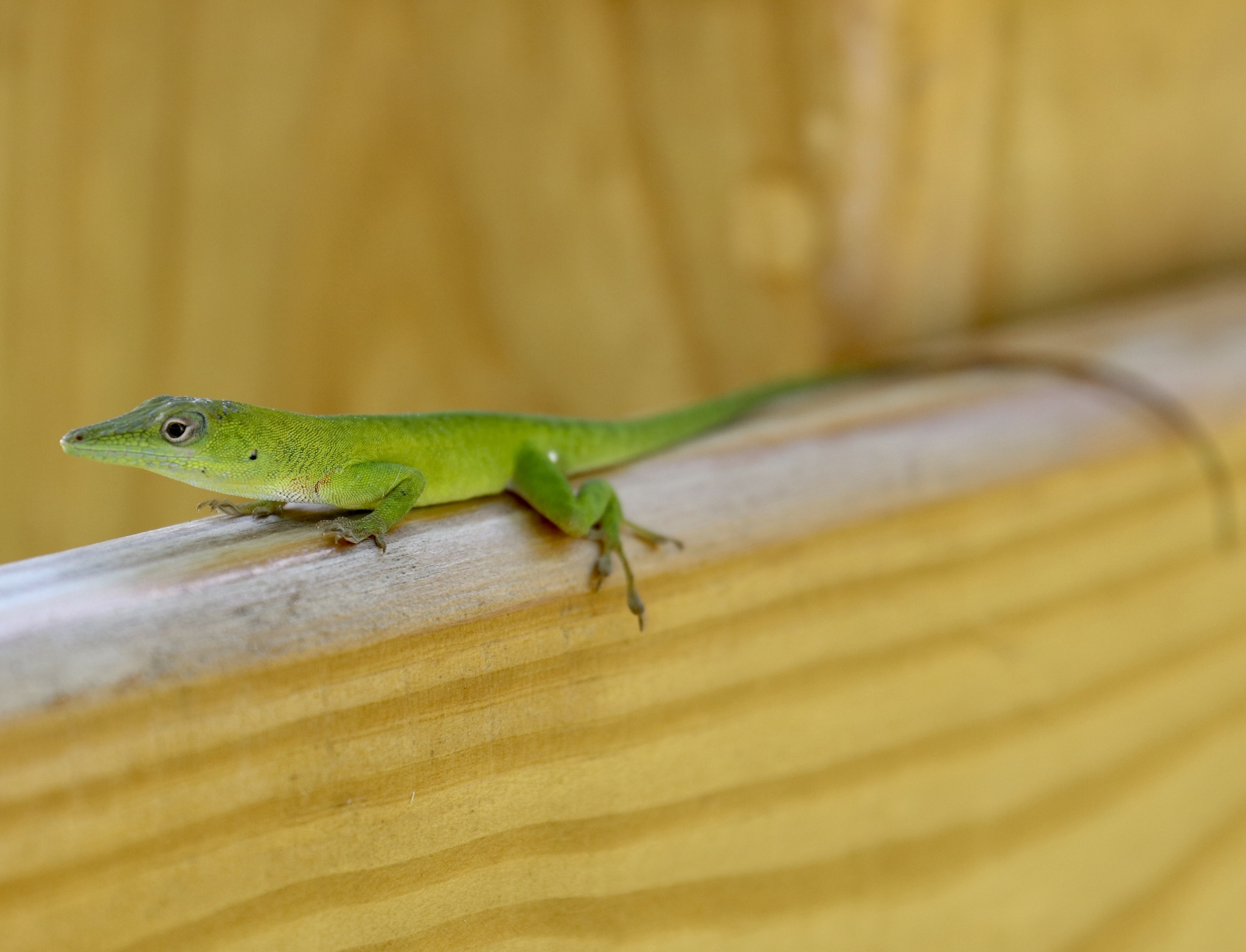

Conservation status
- Least Concern (IUCN 3.1)

Scientific classification
- Kingdom: Animalia
- Phylum: Chordata
- Class: Reptilia
- Order: Squamata
- Suborder: Iguania
- Family: Dactyloidae
- Genus: Anolis
- Species: A. chlorocyanus

Binomial name
- Anolis chlorocyanus Duméril and Bibron, 1837

= Anolis chlorocyanus =

Tiburon green anole

Species of lizard

Anolis chlorocyanus, the Tiburon green anole or Hispaniolan green anole or Jeremie anole, is a species of anole endemic to Haiti, primarily the Tiburon Peninsula and Jérémie and Hispaniola.

== Taxonomy ==
It was formerly thought to have a much wider range across Hispaniola including the Dominican Republic, and to have been introduced to Florida and Suriname, but a 2020 study found the syntypes of A. chlorocyanus to be conspecific with the syntype of the former Anolis coelestinus, a Haitian endemic anole. Thus, both species were synonymized, and the widespread Hispaniolan population was described as a new species, the Dominican green anole (A. callainus). Due to this, A. chlorocyanus was restricted to only the population from Haiti.

== See also ==
- List of Anolis lizards
