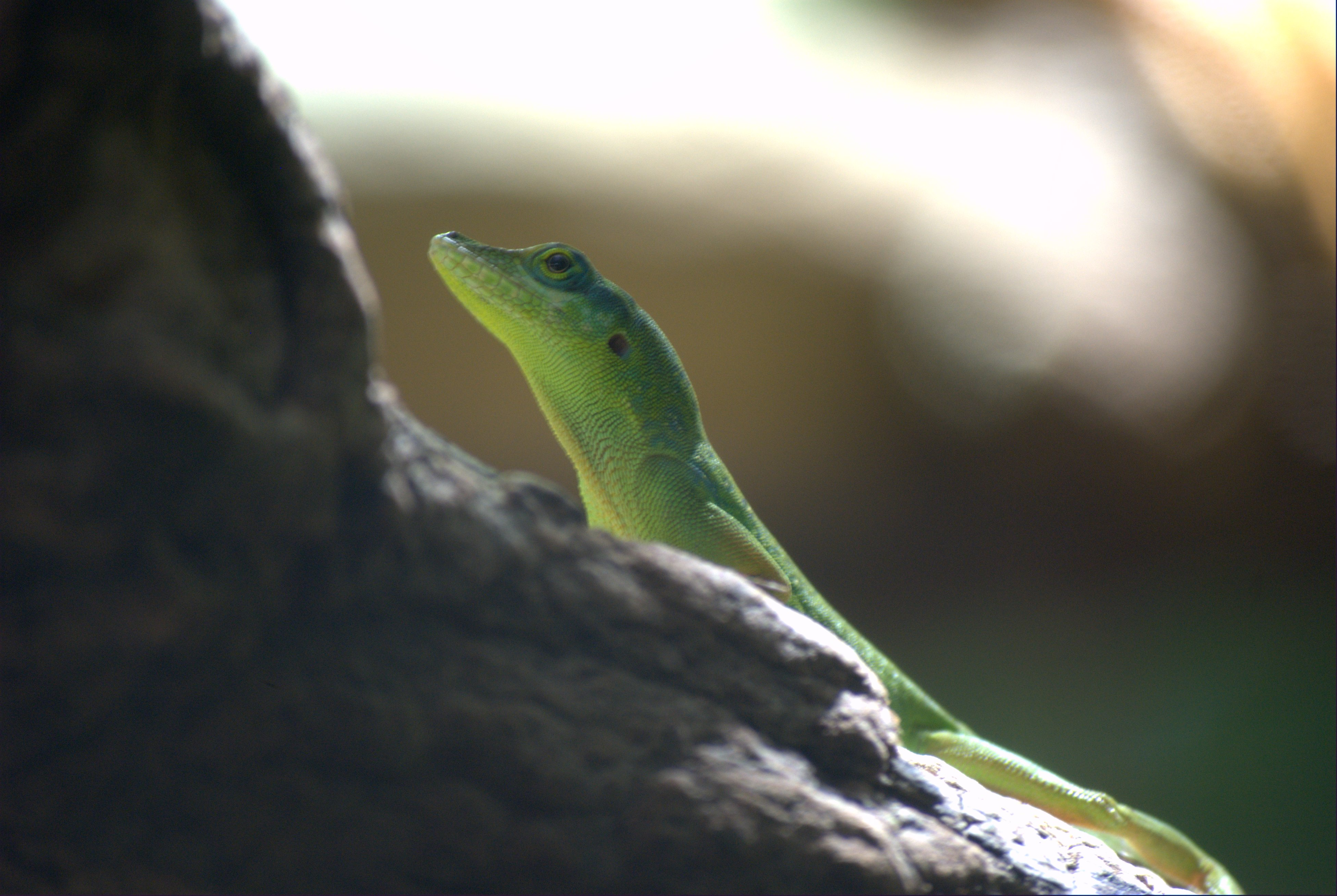

Conservation status
- Least Concern (IUCN 3.1)

Scientific classification
- Kingdom: Animalia
- Phylum: Chordata
- Class: Reptilia
- Order: Squamata
- Suborder: Iguania
- Family: Dactyloidae
- Genus: Anolis
- Species: A. callainus

Binomial name
- Anolis callainus Köhler & Hedges, 2020

= Anolis callainus =

Dominican green anole

Species of lizard

Anolis callainus, the Dominican green anole, Northern Hispaniolan green anole, or Hispaniolan green anole , is a species of lizard in the family Dactyloidae. The species is endemic to the Dominican Republic, where it is found throughout the eastern half of the country. It has also been introduced to Suriname and southern Florida.

Previously considered conspecific with the Tiburon green anole (A. chlorocyanus), a 2020 study restricted chlorocyanus to the population found in western Haiti, and redescribed the eastern Dominican Republic population as a new species, A. callainus.

It is very similar to the North American species, the green anole (Anolis carolinensis), but males have a light blue throat flap, instead of red. Females and juveniles may have darker green stripes lining the sides of their bodies, but males are often a pure bright green color.
