= Gunther Köhler =

German herpetologist (1965–2025)

Gunther Köhler (20 May 1965 – 15 June 2025) was a German herpetologist. His research was primarily focused in Central America and in the West Indies.

== Life and career ==
Köhler was born in Hanau on 20 May 1965. In 1995, Köhler received a doctorate in natural sciences at the Goethe University Frankfurt with his thesis on the systematics and ecology of black iguanas (genus Ctenosaura). From November 1995, he was curator at the department of herpetology and from 2004 acting director of the department of terrestrial zoology at the Senckenberg Research Institute.

The projects of Köhler and his research group focus on the study of neotropical herpetofauna in Central and South America, in particular in Mexico, Costa Rica, Panama, Nicaragua and Bolivia. The studies are taxonomic, zoogeographical and phylogenetic, with the genus Anolis forming one of the main groups.

In 1994, he rediscovered Ctenosaura bakeri (the Utila iguana), a species previously known only from the type specimens described in 1901. From April 1998, Köhler led a breeding program in collaboration with the Frankfurt Zoological Society in Utila.

In 2016, he revised the Anolis species of Hispaniola in collaboration with Stephen Blair Hedges. Among them are eight newly discovered species that are restricted to small distribution areas and threatened with extinction.

Köhler was involved in the original descriptions of more than 120 species of reptiles and amphibians in many genera, including Agama, Anolis, Brookesia, Ctenosaura, Paracontias, Stenocercus, Leptopelis and Pristimantis.

In his spare time, Köhler was a member of the country music band Flaggstaff from Aschaffenburg.

In 1992, Köhler's wife Elke founded the Herpeton Verlag, a special-interest publishing house in Offenbach with the aim of providing reptile owners with particularly well-founded knowledge about their wards.

Köhler died in Frankfurt on 15 June 2025, at the age of 60.
