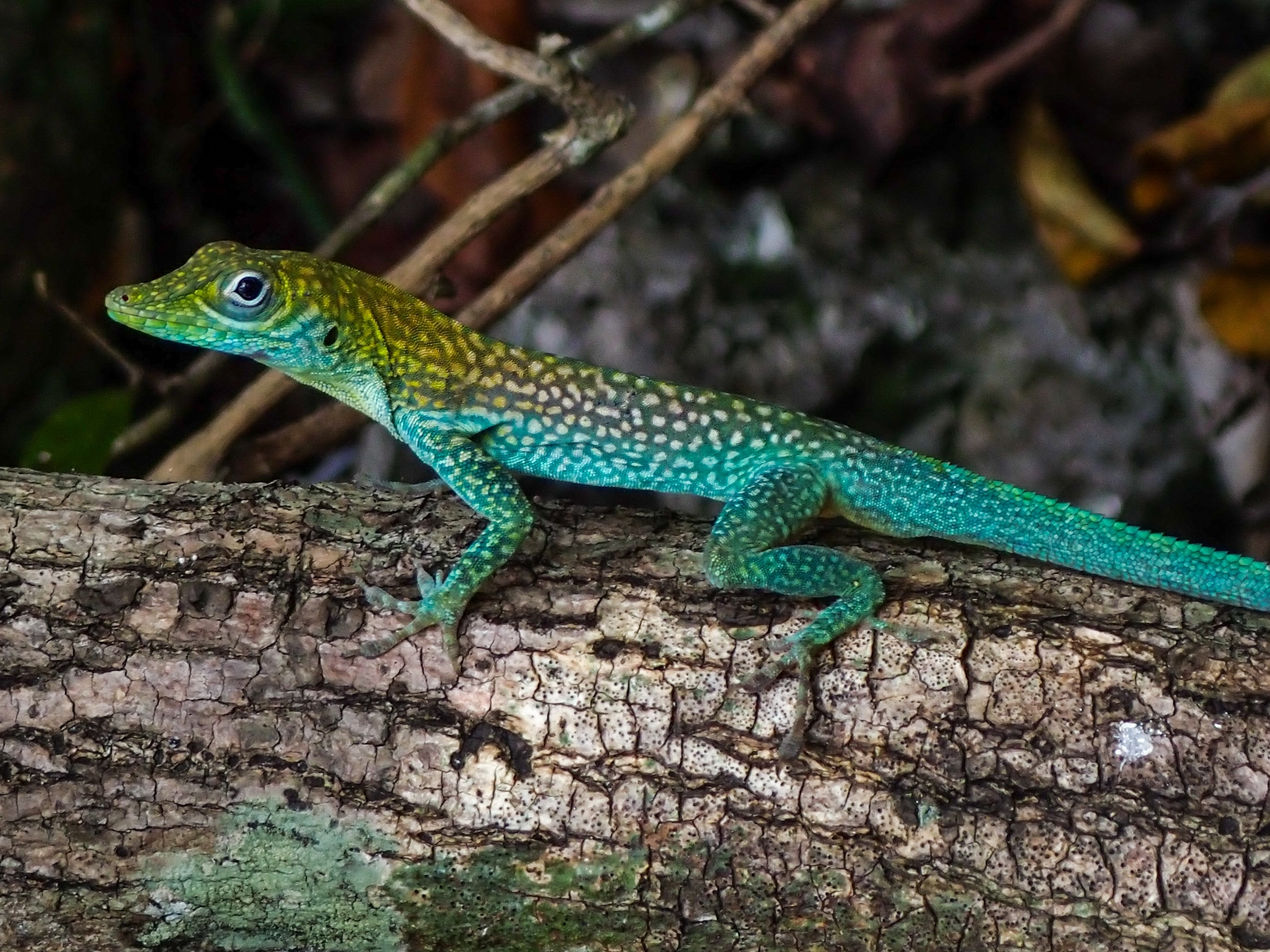

Conservation status
- Least Concern (IUCN 3.1)

Scientific classification
- Kingdom: Animalia
- Phylum: Chordata
- Class: Reptilia
- Order: Squamata
- Suborder: Iguania
- Family: Anolidae
- Genus: Anolis
- Species: A. conspersus

Binomial name
- Anolis conspersus Garman, 1887

Synonyms
- Norops conspersus (Garman, 1887)

= Anolis conspersus =

Species of lizard

Anolis conspersus, also known as the Cayman Islands blue-fanned anole, Grand Cayman blue-fanned anole or Grand Cayman anole, is a species of anole found on the Cayman Islands.

== Taxonomy ==
Anolis conspersus was formally described in 1887 by the American herpetologist Samuel Garman based on an adult male specimen from the island of Grand Cayman in the Cayman Islands. Thomas Barbour, on a 1931 yacht trip, described a specimen of Anolis conspersus as Anolis utowanae, although he erroneously stated its type locality as Mazatlan in Mexico. This taxon was subsequently synonymized with Anolis conspersus in 2014. The subspecies A. c. lewisi was described by the American zoologist Chapman Grant in 1941.

The specific epithet of this anole is derived from a Latin word meaning "covered with small dots". The species has the English common names Cayman Islands blue-fanned anole, Grand Cayman blue-fanned anole, and Grand Cayman anole.

== Distribution ==
Anolis conspersus is endemic to the island of Grand Cayman and its satellite of Booby Cay in the Cayman Islands. It inhabits a variety of vegetated habitats such as mangroves, forests, and shrublands on the island.

== Conservation ==
Anolis conspersus is classified as being of least concern by the IUCN. It has a stable population and is able to adjust to human disturbance of its habitat.

== Gallery ==
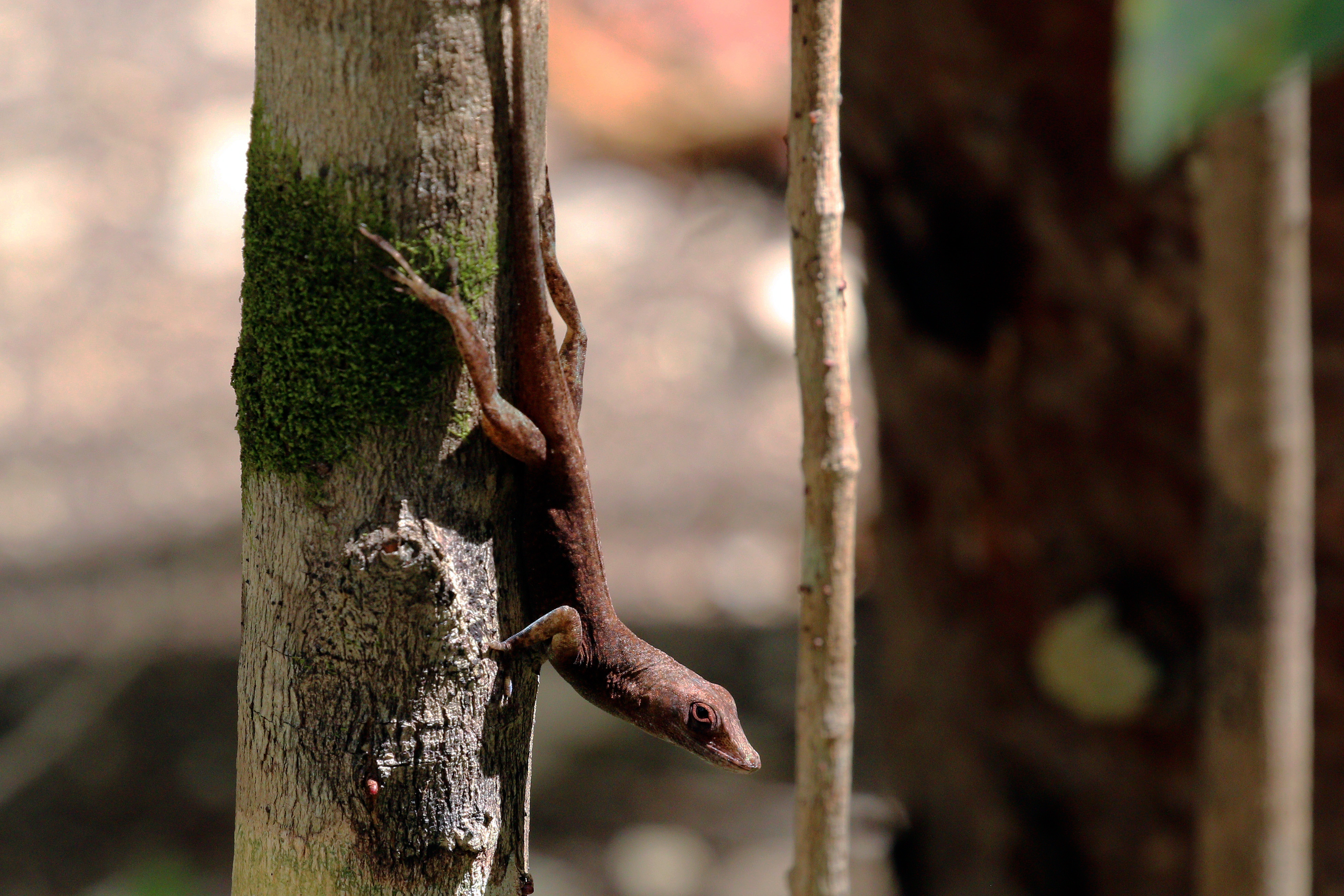
juvenile, Grand Cayman

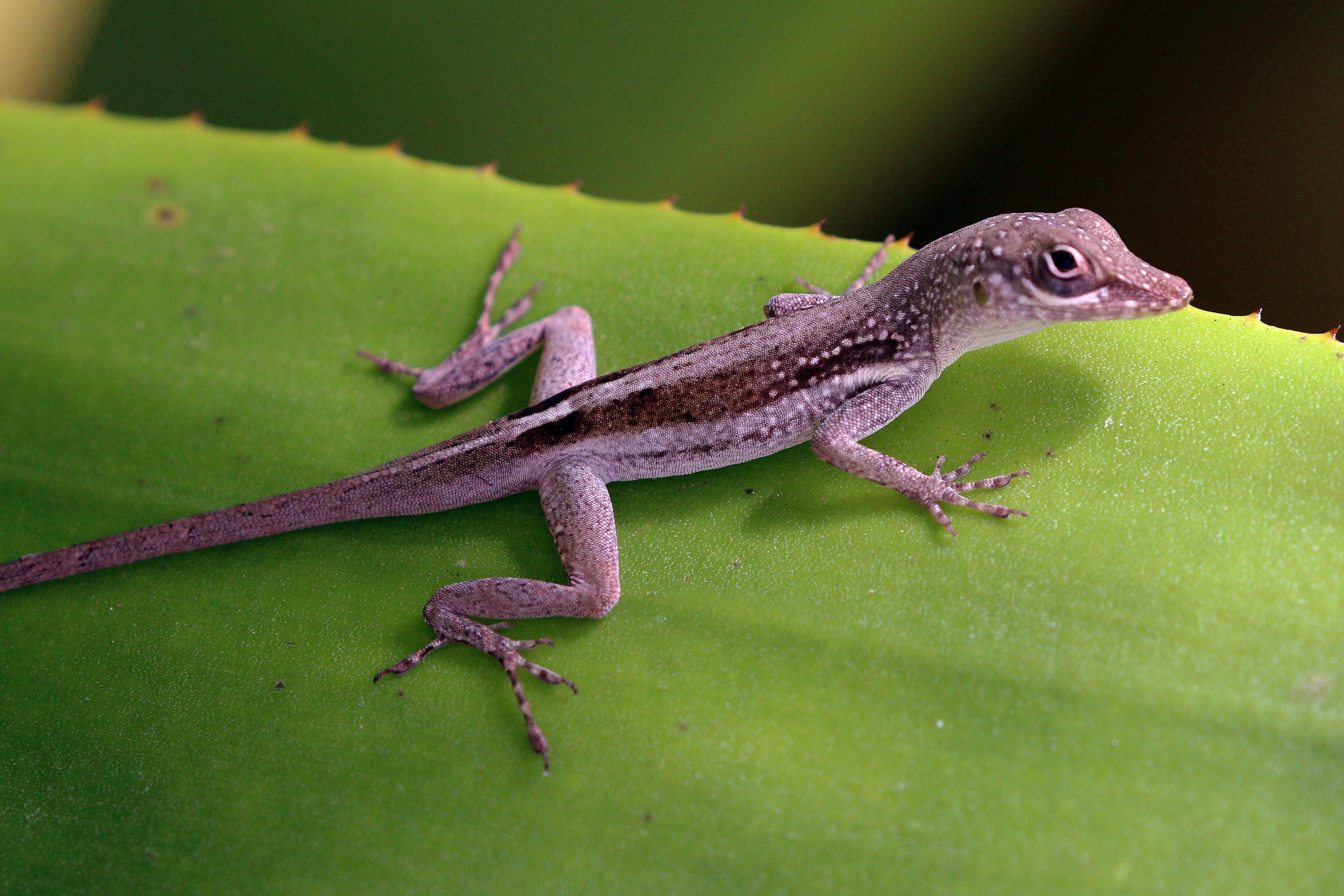
young female, Grand Cayman

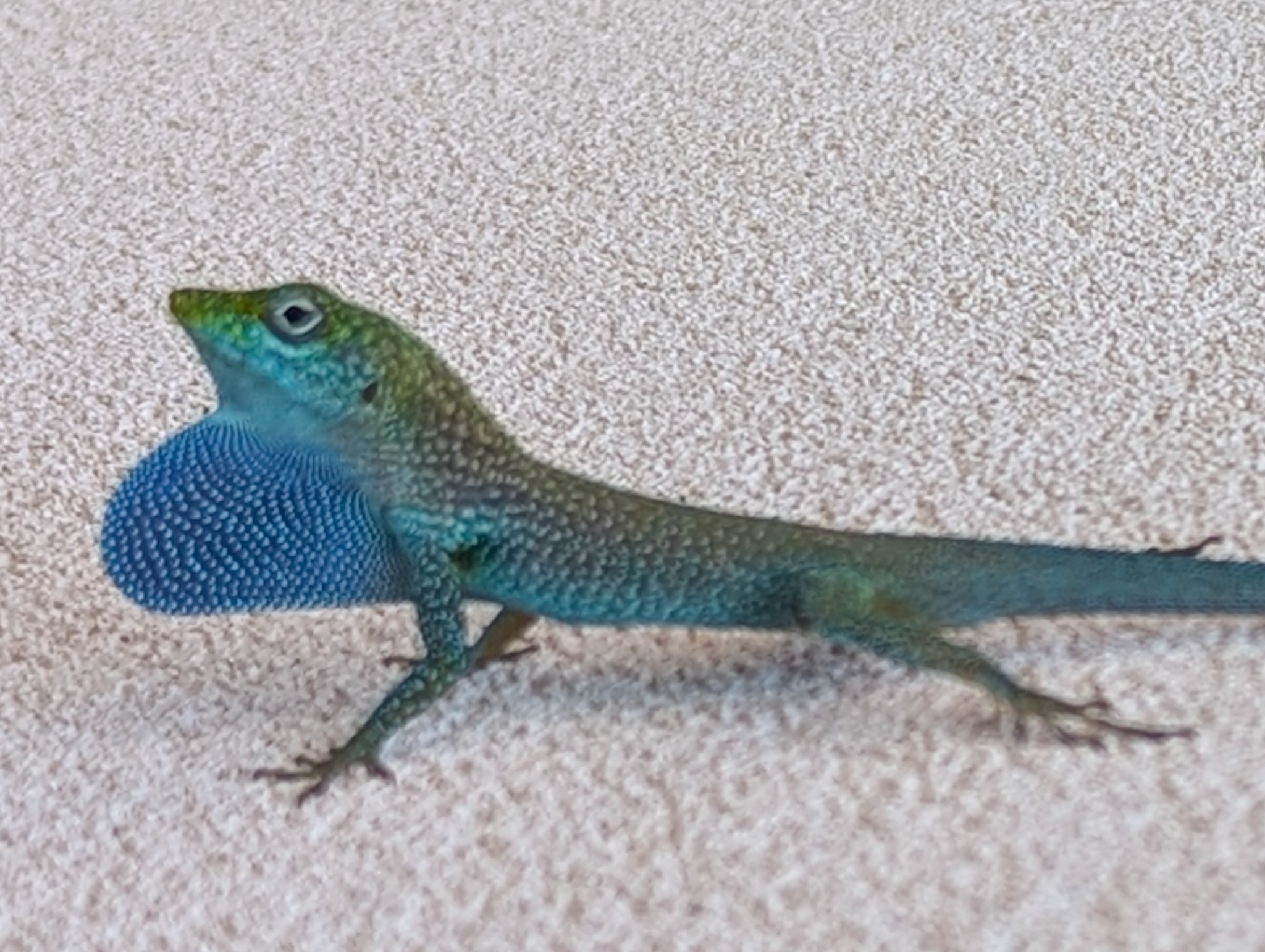
Displaying dewlap
