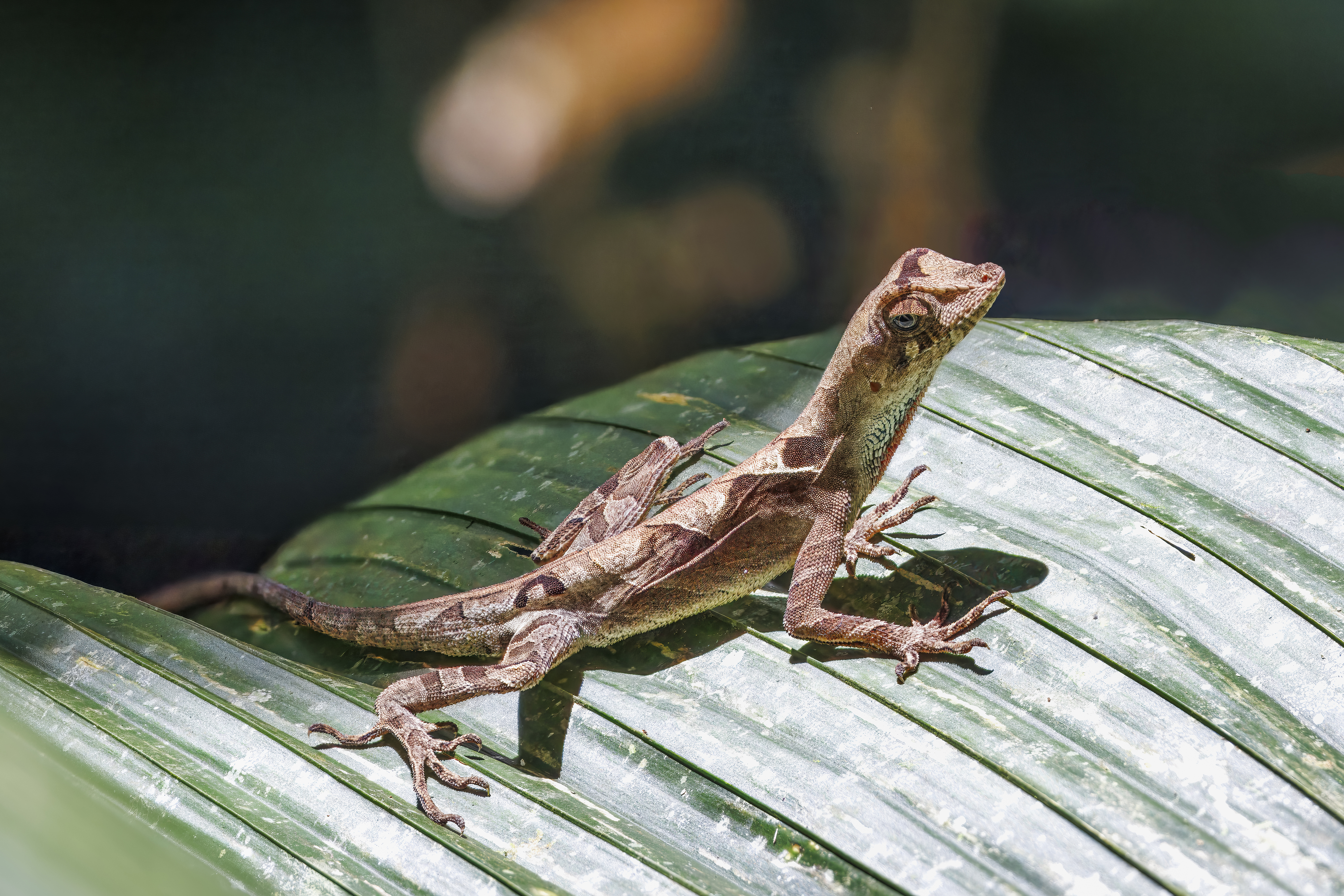
- In Ecuador

Conservation status
- Least Concern (IUCN 3.1)

Scientific classification
- Kingdom: Animalia
- Phylum: Chordata
- Class: Reptilia
- Order: Squamata
- Suborder: Iguania
- Family: Dactyloidae
- Genus: Anolis
- Species: A. scypheus

Binomial name
- Anolis scypheus Cope, 1864

Synonyms
- List: Anolis chrysolepis Guichenot. 1855; Anolis incompertus incompertus Barbour, 1932; Anolis incompertus nicefori Barbour, 1932; Anolis chrysolepis scypheus Vanzolini & Williams, 1970; Norops nitens scypheus Savage & Guyer, 1991; Norops scypheus NICHOLSON et al., 2012

= Anolis scypheus =

Species of lizard

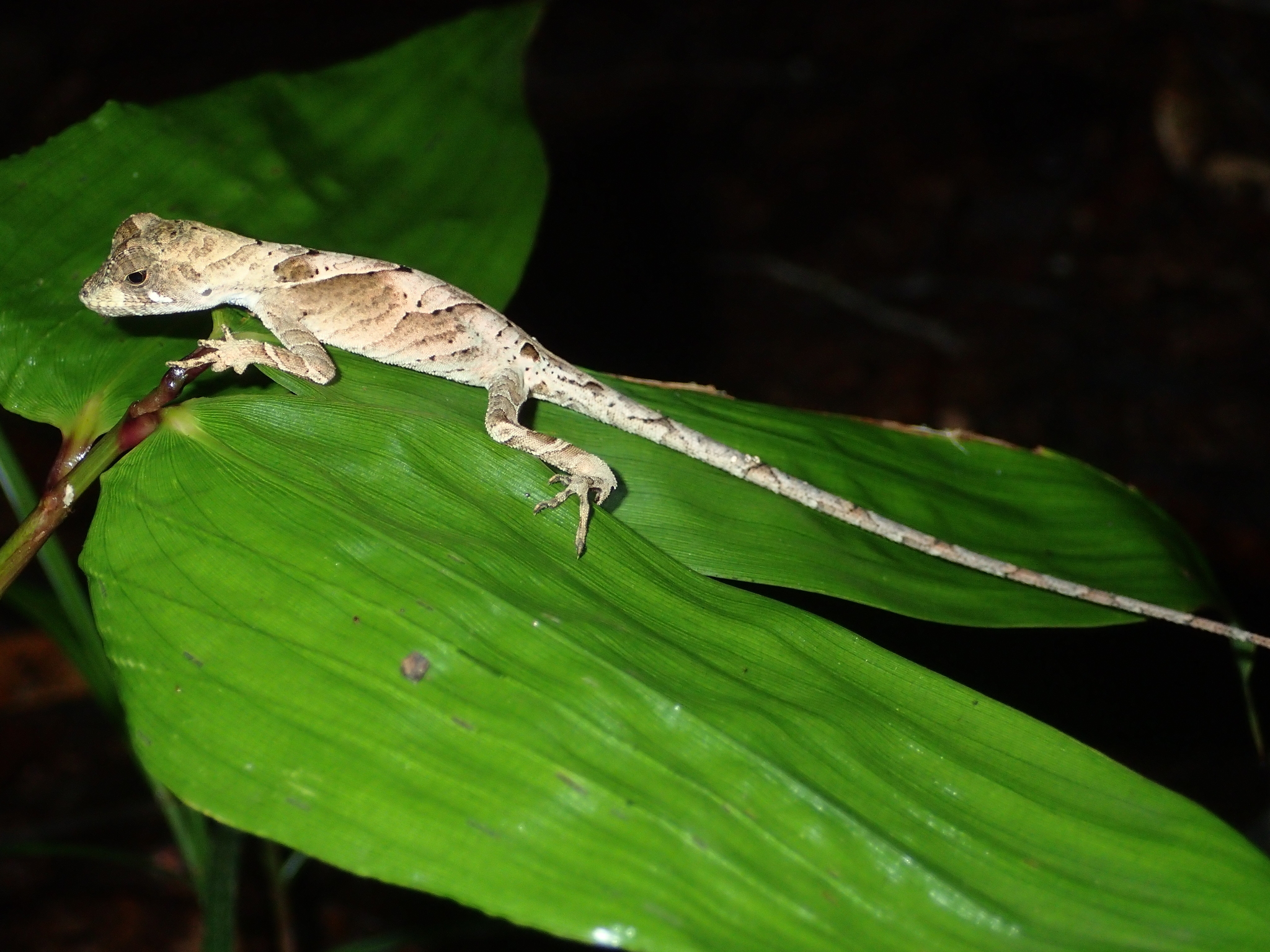

Anolis scypheus, the yellow-tongued anole, is a species of lizard in the family Dactyloidae. The species is found in Colombia, Ecuador, Peru, and Brazil.
