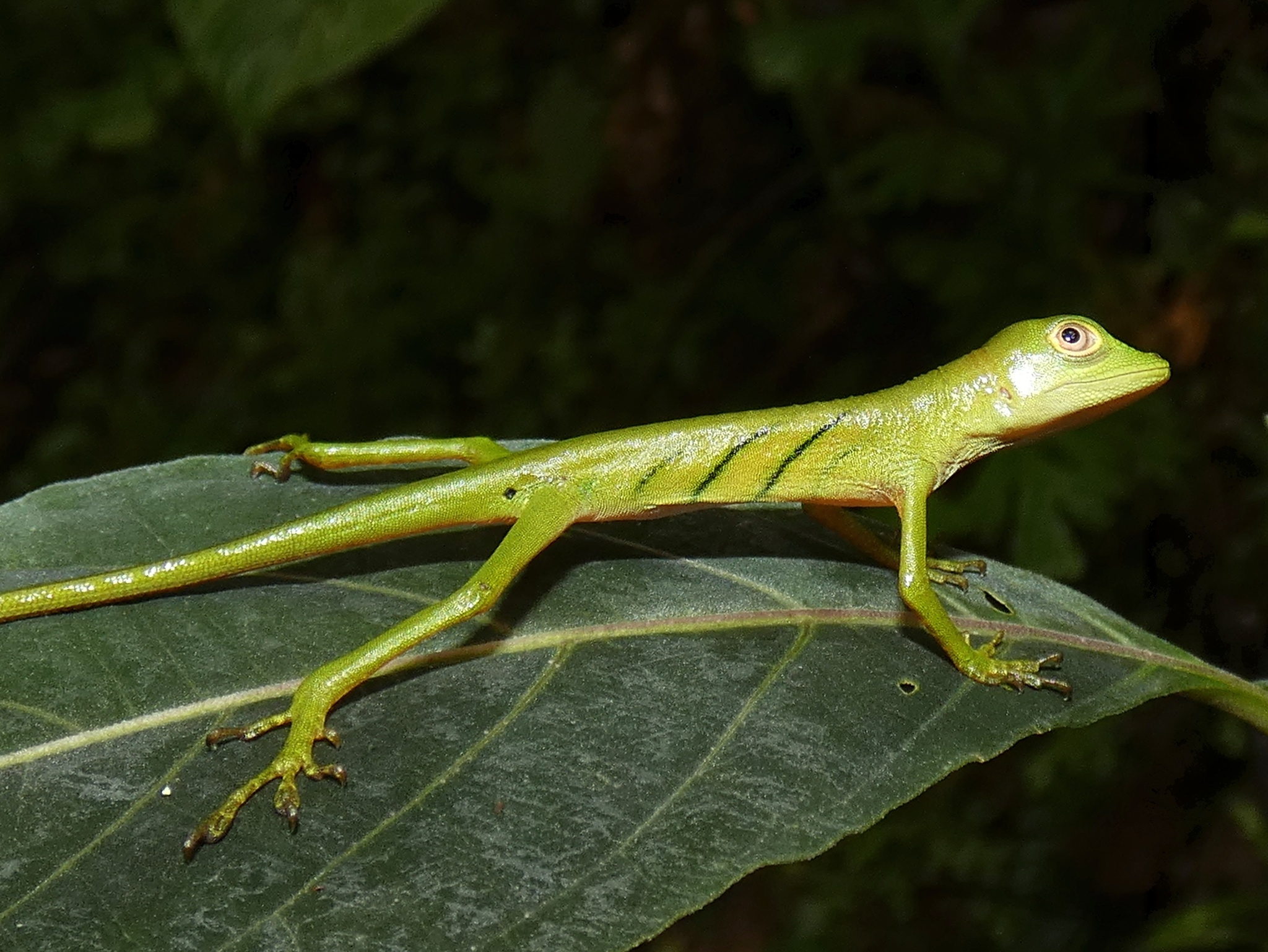
- Anolis ibanezi in Cerro Gaital, Panama

Conservation status
- Least Concern (IUCN 3.1)

Scientific classification
- Kingdom: Animalia
- Phylum: Chordata
- Class: Reptilia
- Order: Squamata
- Suborder: Iguania
- Family: Dactyloidae
- Genus: Anolis
- Species: A. ibanezi

Binomial name
- Anolis ibanezi Poe, Latella, Ryan & Schaad, 2009

Synonyms
- Dactyloa ibanezi (Poe, Latella, Ryan & Schaad, 2009)

= Anolis ibanezi =

Species of lizard

Anolis ibanezi is a species of lizard in the family Dactyloidae. The species is native to Central America.

== Etymology ==
The specific name, ibanezi, is in honor of Panamanian herpetologist Roberto Ibáñez.

== Geographic range ==
A. ibanezi found in Costa Rica and Panama.

== Habitat ==
The preferred natural habitat of A. ibanezi is forest, at altitudes of 400–1,070 m (1,310–3,510 ft).

== Description ==
Large and long-legged for its genus, A. ibanezi may attain a snout-to-vent length (SVL) of 8 cm (3.1 in). Dorsally, it is bright green, and the area around the eye is bright yellow.

== Reproduction ==
A. ibanezi is oviparous.
