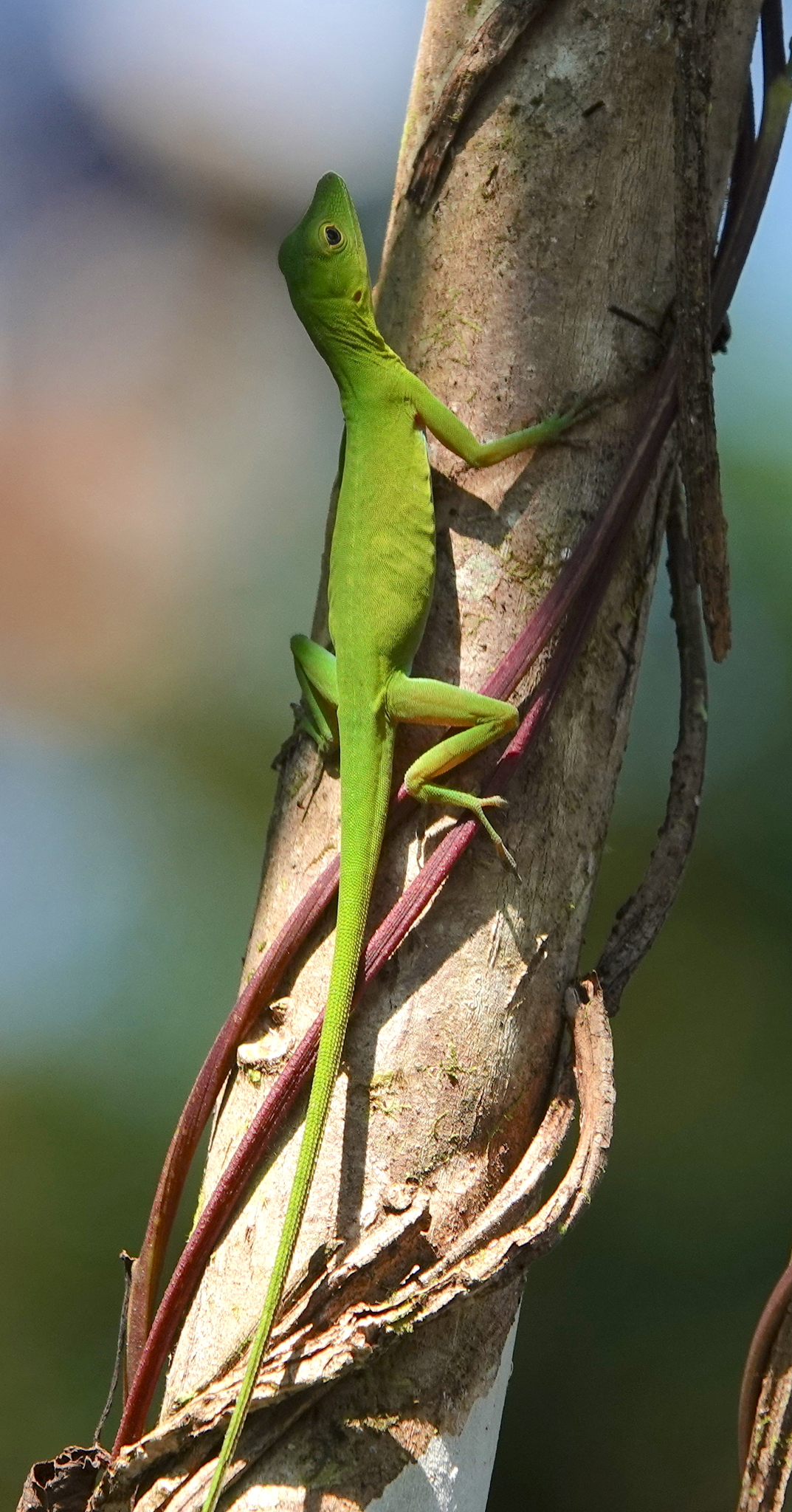

Conservation status
- Least Concern (IUCN 3.1)

Scientific classification
- Kingdom: Animalia
- Phylum: Chordata
- Class: Reptilia
- Order: Squamata
- Suborder: Iguania
- Family: Anolidae
- Genus: Anolis
- Species: A. chloris

Binomial name
- Anolis chloris Boulenger, 1898

Synonyms
- Dactyloa chloris (Boulenger, 1898); Anolis palmeri Boulenger, 1908

= Anolis chloris =

Species of lizard

Anolis chloris, also known commonly as Boulenger's green anole, is a species of lizard in the family Anolidae. The species is native to southern Central America and northwestern South America.

== Geographic distribution ==
Anolis chloris is found in Colombia, Ecuador, and Panama.

== Habitat ==
The preferred natural habitat of Anolis chloris is forest at elevations from near sea level to 1,700 m (5,600 ft).

== Reproduction ==
Anolis chloris is oviparous.

== Etymology ==
The specific name of a synonym, palmeri, is in honor of English naturalist Mervyn George Palmer (1882–1954), who collected the holotype.
