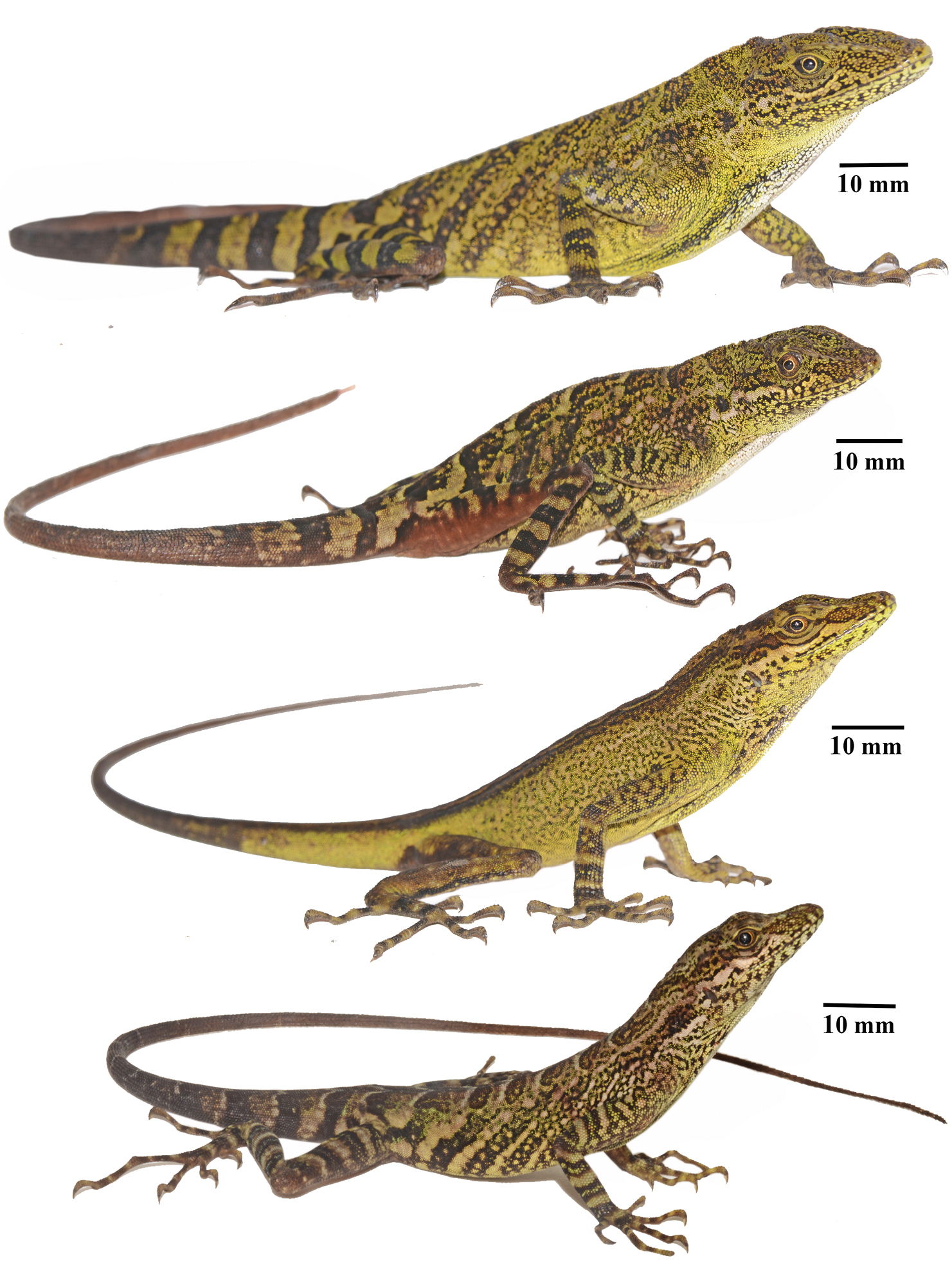

Scientific classification
- Kingdom: Animalia
- Phylum: Chordata
- Class: Reptilia
- Order: Squamata
- Suborder: Iguania
- Family: Anolidae
- Genus: Anolis
- Species: A. dracula

Binomial name
- Anolis dracula Yánez-Muñoz, Reyes-Puig, Reyes-Puig, Velasco, Ayala-Varela, & Torres-Carvajal, 2018

= Anolis dracula =

Species of lizard

Anolis dracula the Dracula anole, is a species of lizard in the family Dactyloidae. The species is found in Ecuador and Colombia.
