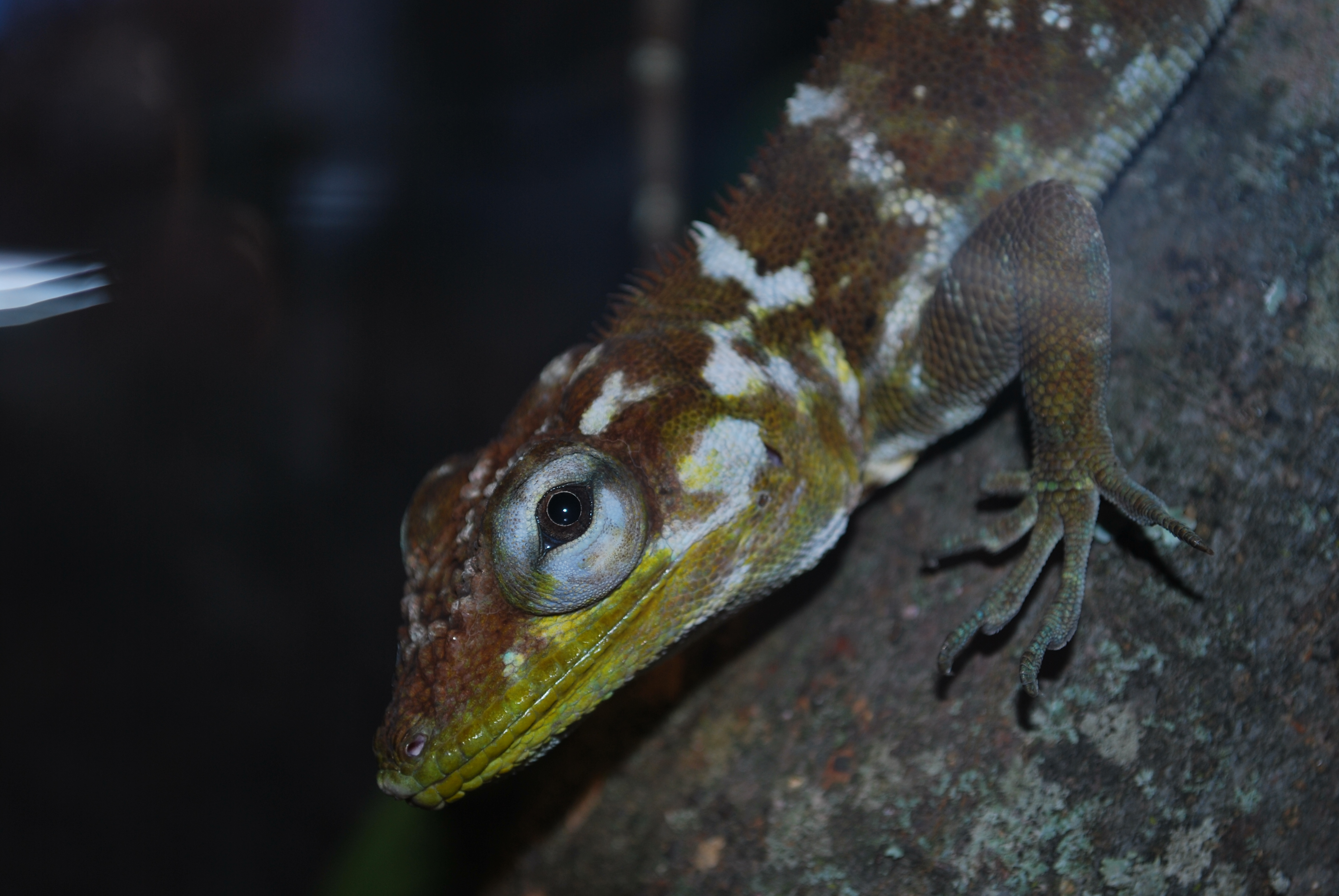

Conservation status
- Least Concern (IUCN 3.1)

Scientific classification
- Kingdom: Animalia
- Phylum: Chordata
- Class: Reptilia
- Order: Squamata
- Suborder: Iguania
- Family: Dactyloidae
- Genus: Anolis
- Species: A. baleatus

Binomial name
- Anolis baleatus (Cope, 1864)

= Anolis baleatus =

Species of lizard

Anolis baleatus, the Dominican giant anole or Puerto Plata anole, is a species of lizard in the family Dactyloidae. The species is found in Dominican Republic.
