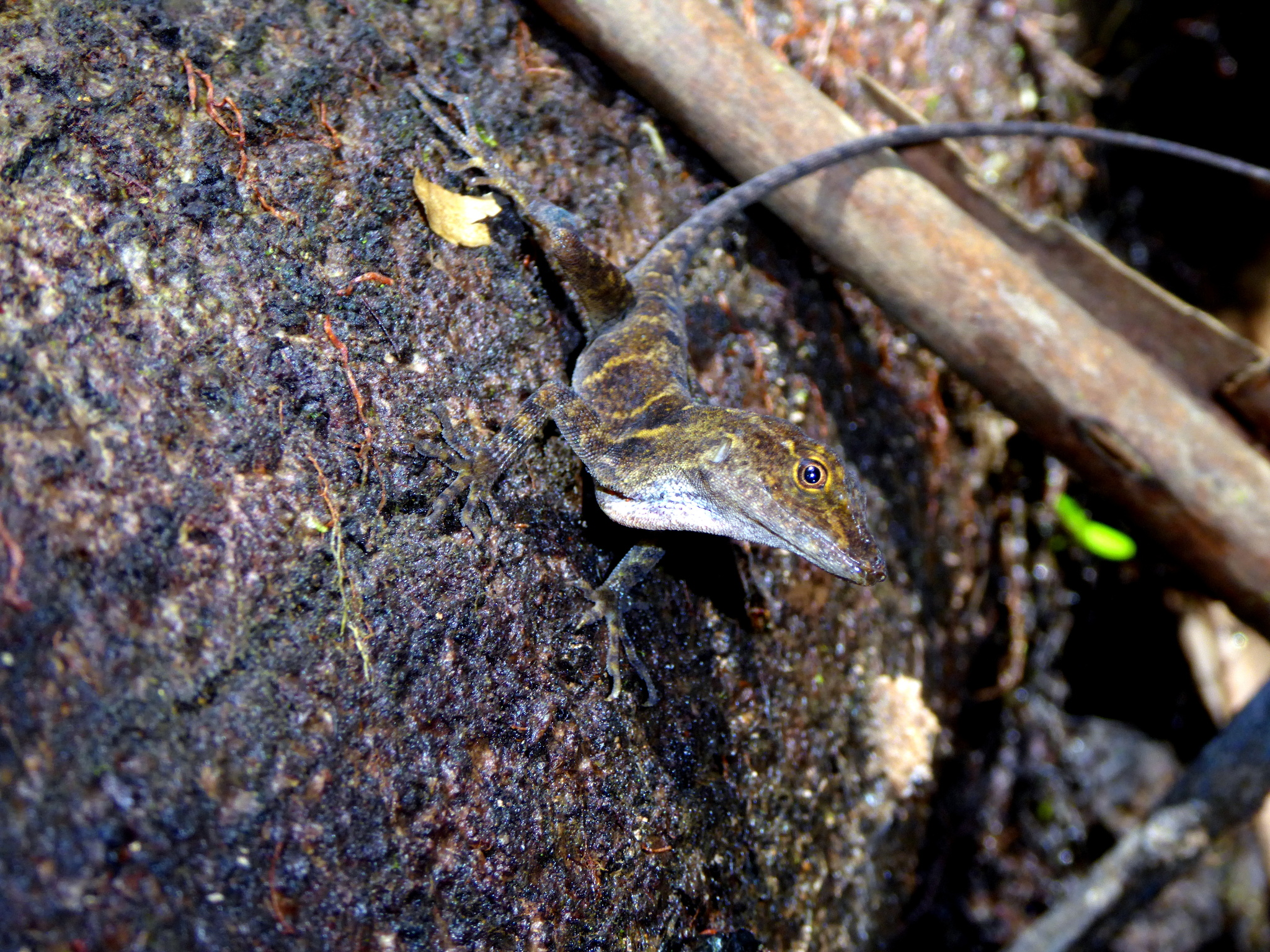

Scientific classification
- Kingdom: Animalia
- Phylum: Chordata
- Class: Reptilia
- Order: Squamata
- Suborder: Iguania
- Family: Dactyloidae
- Genus: Anolis
- Species: A. cobanensis

Binomial name
- Anolis cobanensis Stuart, 1942

= Anolis cobanensis =

Species of lizard

Anolis cobanensis, or Stuart's anole, is a species of lizard in the family Dactyloidae. The species is found in Guatemala and Mexico.
