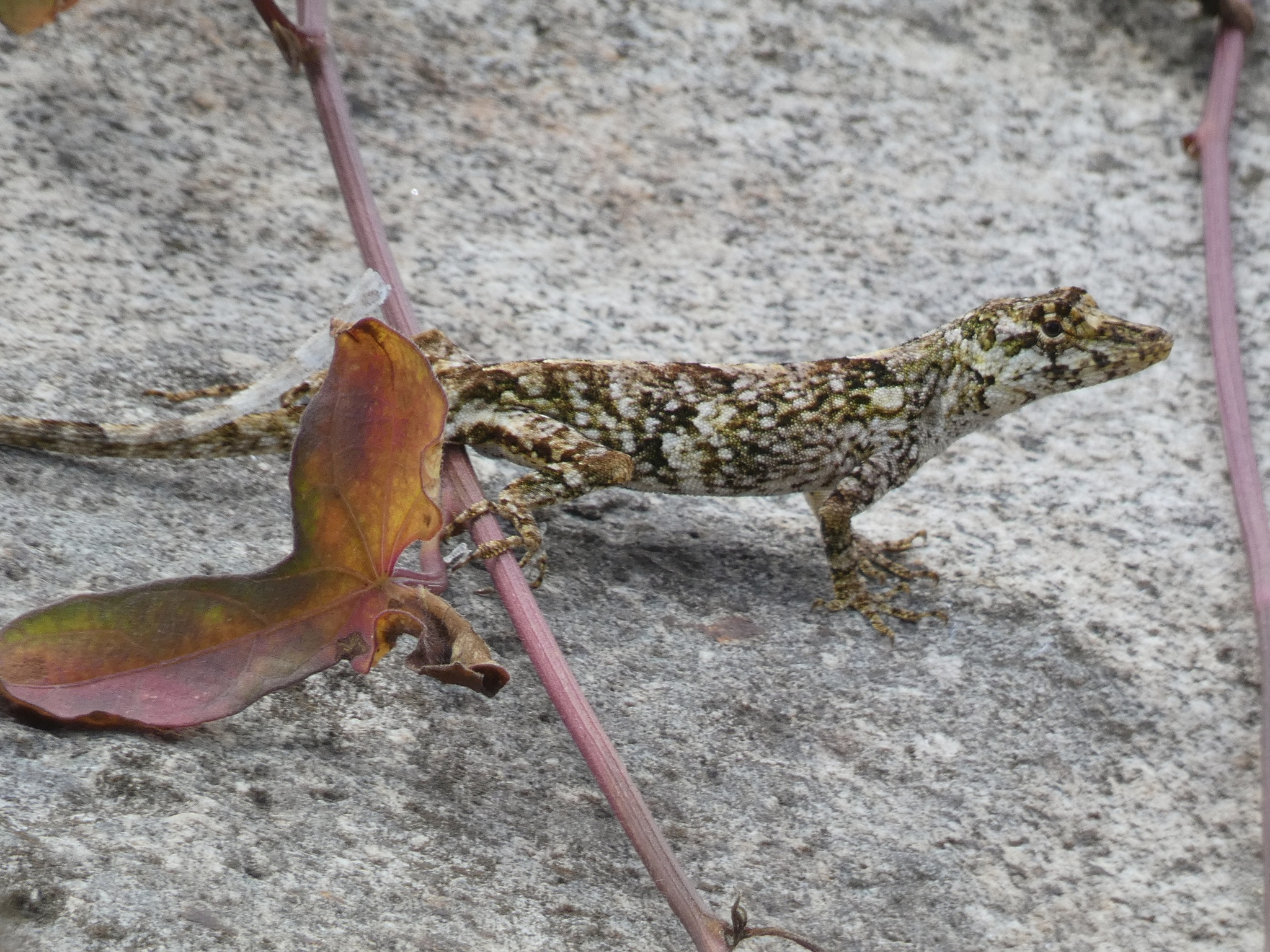

Scientific classification
- Kingdom: Animalia
- Phylum: Chordata
- Class: Reptilia
- Order: Squamata
- Suborder: Iguania
- Family: Dactyloidae
- Genus: Anolis
- Species: A. salvini

Binomial name
- Anolis salvini Boulenger, 1885

= Anolis salvini =

Species of lizard

Anolis salvini, Salvin's anole, is a species of lizard in the family Dactyloidae. The species is found in Panama and Costa Rica.
