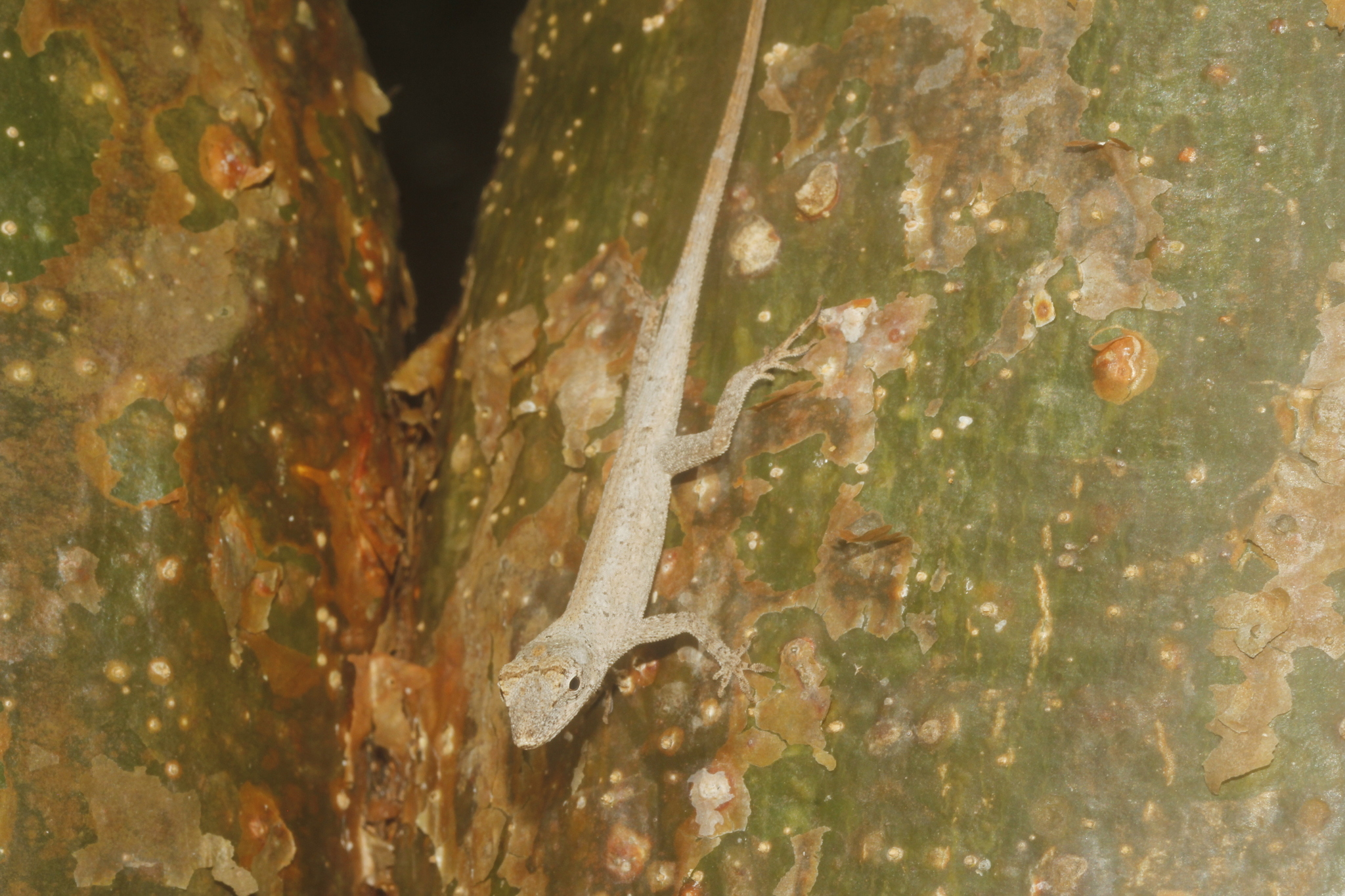

Scientific classification
- Kingdom: Animalia
- Phylum: Chordata
- Class: Reptilia
- Order: Squamata
- Suborder: Iguania
- Family: Dactyloidae
- Genus: Anolis
- Species: A. ustus

Binomial name
- Anolis ustus Cope, 1864

= Anolis ustus =

Species of lizard

Anolis ustus is a species of lizard in the family Dactyloidae. The species is found in Mexico, Belize, and Guatemala.
