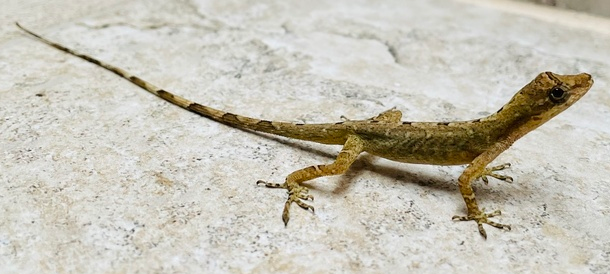

Conservation status
- Least Concern (IUCN 3.1)

Scientific classification
- Kingdom: Animalia
- Phylum: Chordata
- Class: Reptilia
- Order: Squamata
- Suborder: Iguania
- Family: Dactyloidae
- Genus: Anolis
- Species: A. antonii

Binomial name
- Anolis antonii Boulenger, 1908

= Anolis antonii =

Species of lizard

Anolis antonii, the San Antonio anole or Anton's anole, is a species of lizard in the family Dactyloidae. The species is found in Colombia.
