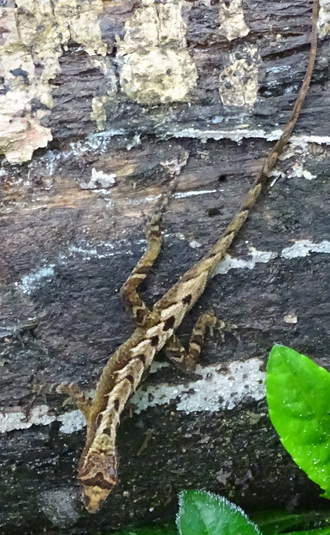

Scientific classification
- Kingdom: Animalia
- Phylum: Chordata
- Class: Reptilia
- Order: Squamata
- Suborder: Iguania
- Family: Dactyloidae
- Genus: Anolis
- Species: A. marsupialis

Binomial name
- Anolis marsupialis Taylor, 1956

= Anolis marsupialis =

Species of lizard

Anolis marsupialis is a species of lizard in the family Dactyloidae. The species is found in Costa Rica.
