= Anolis quaggulus =

Conservation status
- Least Concern (IUCN 3.1)

Scientific classification
- Kingdom: Animalia
- Phylum: Chordata
- Class: Reptilia
- Order: Squamata
- Suborder: Iguania
- Family: Dactyloidae
- Genus: Anolis
- Species: A. quaggulus

Binomial name
- Anolis quaggulus Cope, 1885

Synonyms
- Norops quaggulus (Cope, 1885)

Species of lizard

Anolis quaggulus is a species of lizard in the family Dactyloidae. The species is found in Honduras, Nicaragua, and Costa Rica.
