= Anolis hyacinthogularis =

Scientific classification
- Kingdom: Animalia
- Phylum: Chordata
- Class: Reptilia
- Order: Squamata
- Suborder: Iguania
- Family: Anolidae
- Genus: Anolis
- Species: A. hyacinthogularis

Binomial name
- Anolis hyacinthogularis Torres-Carvajal, Ayala-Varela, Lobos, Poe, & Narváez, 2017

Species of lizard

Anolis hyacinthogularis, the blue dewlap anole, is a species of lizard in the family Dactyloidae. The species is found in Ecuador.
