= Anolis quimbaya =

Scientific classification
- Kingdom: Animalia
- Phylum: Chordata
- Class: Reptilia
- Order: Squamata
- Suborder: Iguania
- Family: Dactyloidae
- Genus: Anolis
- Species: A. quimbaya

Binomial name
- Anolis quimbaya Moreno-Arias, Méndez-Galeano, Beltrán, & Vargas-Ramírez, 2023

Species of lizard

Anolis quimbaya, the Quimbaya anole, is a species of lizard in the family Dactyloidae. The species is found in Colombia.
