= Anolis torresfundorai =

Scientific classification
- Kingdom: Animalia
- Phylum: Chordata
- Class: Reptilia
- Order: Squamata
- Suborder: Iguania
- Family: Dactyloidae
- Genus: Anolis
- Species: A. torresfundorai

Binomial name
- Anolis torresfundorai Torres et al. 2025

Species of lizard

Anolis torresfundorai, also known as the Torres Fundora's green anole and the Eastern Cuba green anole, is a species of lizard in the family Anolidae.

The species is endemic to eastern Cuba.
