= Anolis microlepidotus =

Conservation status
- Least Concern (IUCN 3.1)

Scientific classification
- Kingdom: Animalia
- Phylum: Chordata
- Class: Reptilia
- Order: Squamata
- Suborder: Iguania
- Family: Anolidae
- Genus: Anolis
- Species: A. microlepidotus

Binomial name
- Anolis microlepidotus Davis, 1954

Species of lizard

Anolis microlepidotus, the Guerreran oak anole, is a species of lizard in the family Dactyloidae. It is found in Mexico.
