= Anolis purpuronectes =

Scientific classification
- Kingdom: Animalia
- Phylum: Chordata
- Class: Reptilia
- Order: Squamata
- Suborder: Iguania
- Family: Anolidae
- Genus: Anolis
- Species: A. purpuronectes

Binomial name
- Anolis purpuronectes Gray, Meza-Lázaro, Poe, & Nieto-Montes de Oca, 2016

Species of lizard

Anolis purpuronectes is a species of lizard in the family Dactyloidae. The species is found in Mexico.
