= Anolis soinii =

Conservation status
- Least Concern (IUCN 3.1)

Scientific classification
- Kingdom: Animalia
- Phylum: Chordata
- Class: Reptilia
- Order: Squamata
- Suborder: Iguania
- Family: Dactyloidae
- Genus: Anolis
- Species: A. soinii

Binomial name
- Anolis soinii Poe & Yañez-Miranda, 2008

Species of lizard

Anolis soinii is a species of lizard in the family Dactyloidae. The species is found in Peru and Ecuador.
