= Anolis gibbiceps =

Scientific classification
- Kingdom: Animalia
- Phylum: Chordata
- Class: Reptilia
- Order: Squamata
- Suborder: Iguania
- Family: Dactyloidae
- Genus: Anolis
- Species: A. gibbiceps

Binomial name
- Anolis gibbiceps Cope, 1864

Species of lizard

Anolis gibbiceps, the hook anole, is a species of lizard in the family Dactyloidae. The species is found in French Guiana, Venezuela, Guyana, and Suriname.
