= Anolis peruensis =

Scientific classification
- Kingdom: Animalia
- Phylum: Chordata
- Class: Reptilia
- Order: Squamata
- Suborder: Iguania
- Family: Dactyloidae
- Genus: Anolis
- Species: A. peruensis

Binomial name
- Anolis peruensis Poe, Latella, Ayala-Varela, Yañez-Miranda & Torres-Carvajal, 2015

Species of lizard

Anolis peruensis is a species of lizard in the family Dactyloidae. The species is found in Peru.
