= Anolis casildae =

Scientific classification
- Kingdom: Animalia
- Phylum: Chordata
- Class: Reptilia
- Order: Squamata
- Suborder: Iguania
- Family: Dactyloidae
- Genus: Anolis
- Species: A. casildae

Binomial name
- Anolis casildae Arosemena, Ibáñez, & De Sousa, 1991

Species of lizard

Anolis casildae, Casilda's anole, is a species of lizard in the family Dactyloidae. The species is found in Panama.
