= Anolis elcopeensis =

Scientific classification
- Kingdom: Animalia
- Phylum: Chordata
- Class: Reptilia
- Order: Squamata
- Suborder: Iguania
- Family: Dactyloidae
- Genus: Anolis
- Species: A. elcopeensis

Binomial name
- Anolis elcopeensis Poe, Scarpetta, & Schaad, 2015

Species of lizard

Anolis elcopeensis is a species of lizard in the family Dactyloidae. The species is found in Panama.
