= Anolis oligaspis =

Scientific classification
- Kingdom: Animalia
- Phylum: Chordata
- Class: Reptilia
- Order: Squamata
- Suborder: Iguania
- Family: Dactyloidae
- Genus: Anolis
- Species: A. oligaspis

Binomial name
- Anolis oligaspis Cope, 1894

Species of lizard

Anolis oligaspis, the Bahama anole, is a species of lizard in the family Dactyloidae. The species is found in the Bahamas.
