= Anolis kathydayae =

Scientific classification
- Kingdom: Animalia
- Phylum: Chordata
- Class: Reptilia
- Order: Squamata
- Suborder: Iguania
- Family: Dactyloidae
- Genus: Anolis
- Species: A. kathydayae

Binomial name
- Anolis kathydayae Poe & Ryan, 2017

Species of lizard

Anolis kathydayae is a species of lizard in the family Dactyloidae. The species is found in Panama.
