= Anolis damulus =

Scientific classification
- Kingdom: Animalia
- Phylum: Chordata
- Class: Reptilia
- Order: Squamata
- Suborder: Iguania
- Family: Dactyloidae
- Genus: Anolis
- Species: A. damulus

Binomial name
- Anolis damulus Cope, 1864

Species of lizard

Anolis damulus, Cope's smooth anole, is a species of lizard in the family Dactyloidae. The species is found in Mexico.
