= Anolis limon =

Scientific classification
- Kingdom: Animalia
- Phylum: Chordata
- Class: Reptilia
- Order: Squamata
- Suborder: Iguania
- Family: Dactyloidae
- Genus: Anolis
- Species: A. limon

Binomial name
- Anolis limon Velasco & Hurtado-Gomez, 2014

Species of lizard

Anolis limon is a species of lizard in the family Dactyloidae. The species is found in Colombia.
