= Anolis brooksi =

Scientific classification
- Kingdom: Animalia
- Phylum: Chordata
- Class: Reptilia
- Order: Squamata
- Suborder: Iguania
- Family: Dactyloidae
- Genus: Anolis
- Species: A. brooksi

Binomial name
- Anolis brooksi (Barbour, 1923)

Species of lizard

Anolis brooksi is a species of lizard in the family Dactyloidae. The species is found in Panama.
