= Anolis savagei =

Scientific classification
- Kingdom: Animalia
- Phylum: Chordata
- Class: Reptilia
- Order: Squamata
- Suborder: Iguania
- Family: Anolidae
- Genus: Anolis
- Species: A. savagei

Binomial name
- Anolis savagei Poe & Ryan, 2017

Species of lizard

Anolis savagei is a species of lizard in the family Dactyloidae. The species is found in Costa Rica.
