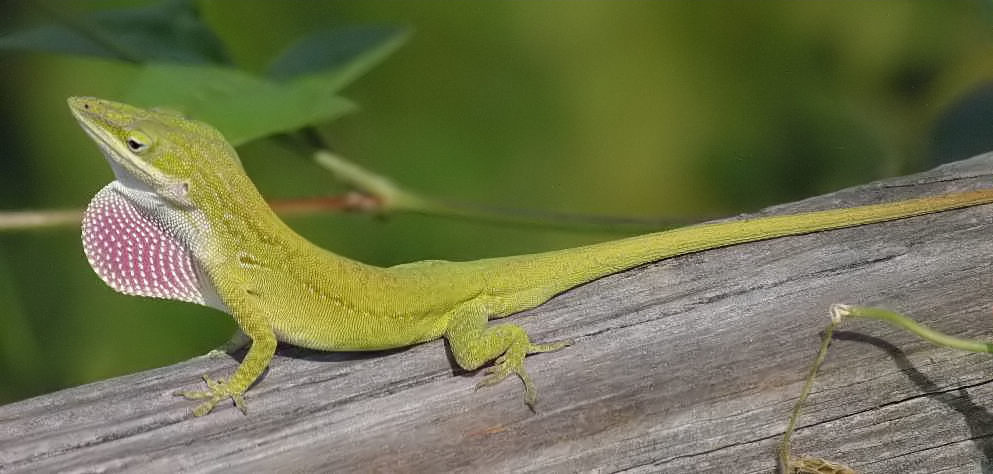
- Carolina (or green) anole

Scientific classification
- Kingdom: Animalia
- Phylum: Chordata
- Class: Reptilia
- Order: Squamata
- Suborder: Iguania
- Family: Anolidae; Guilding, 1834

Genera
- 1–8, see text

Synonyms
- Dactyloidae Fitzinger, 1843

= Anolidae =

Anolidae Temporal range: Eocene - Recent

Family of reptiles

Anolidae is a family of lizards commonly known as anoles (singular anole US: /əˈnoʊ.li/) and native to warmer parts of the Americas, ranging from the southeastern United States to Paraguay. The family was formerly known as Dactyloidae, but it was discovered that the name Anolidae had been used earlier. In the past they were included in the family Polychrotidae together with the genus Polychrus (bush anoles), but the latter genus is not closely related to the true anoles.

Anoles are small to fairly large lizards, typically green or brownish, but their color varies depending on species and many can also change it. In most species at least the male has a dewlap, an often brightly colored flap of skin that extends from the throat and is used in displays. Anoles share several characteristics with geckos, including details of the foot structure (for climbing) and the ability to voluntarily break off the tail (to escape predators), but they are only very distantly related, anoles being part of Iguania.

Anoles are active during the day and feed mostly on small animals such as insects, but some will also take fruits, flowers, and nectar. Almost all species are fiercely territorial. After mating, the female lays an egg (occasionally two); in many species she may do so every few days or weeks. The egg is typically placed on the ground, but in some species it is placed at higher levels.

Anoles are widely studied in fields such as ecology, behavior, and evolution, and some species are commonly kept in captivity as pets. Anoles can function as a biological pest control by eating insects that may harm humans or plants, but represent a serious risk to small native animals and ecosystems if introduced to regions outside their home range.

== Distribution and habitat ==
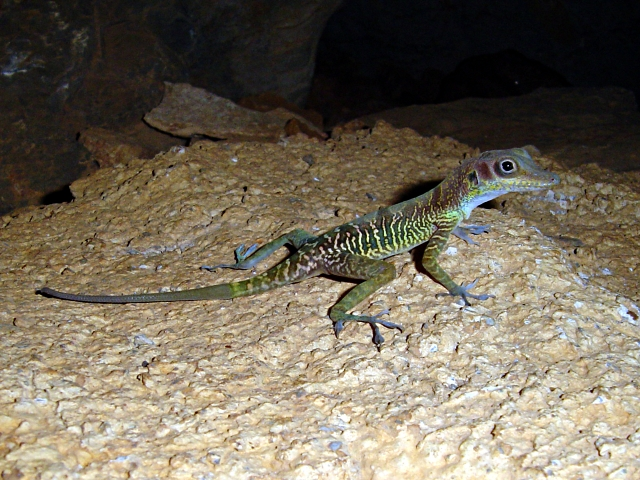
Cuba is home to more than 60 anole species (second only to Colombia), most found nowhere else, like this West Cuban anole

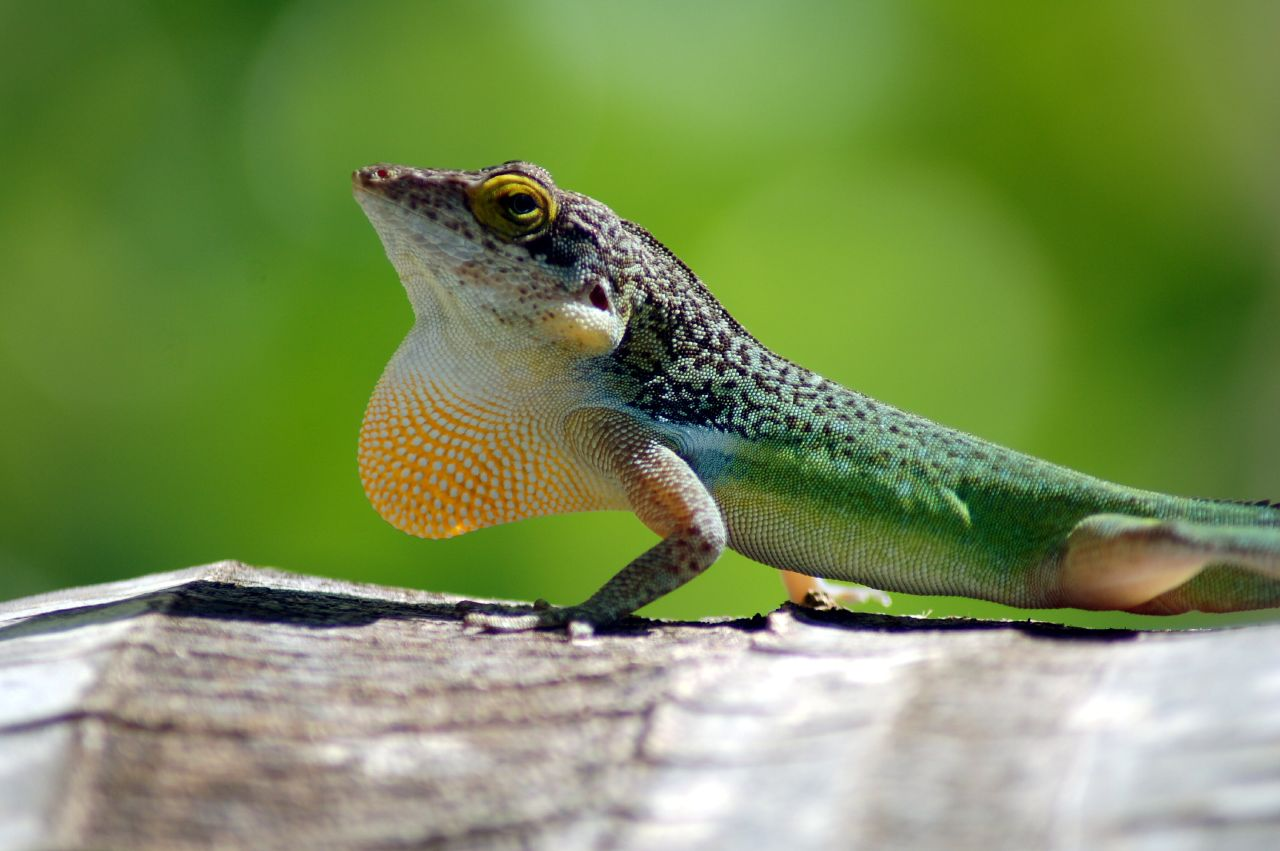
Like all Lesser Antillean anoles, Leach's anole has a very small range

Anoles are a very diverse and plentiful group of lizards. They are native to tropical and subtropical South America, Central America, Mexico, the offshore East Pacific Cocos, Gorgona and Malpelo Islands, the West Indies and southeastern United States.

A particularly high species richness exists in Cuba (more than 60 species), Hispaniola (more than 55), Mexico (more than 50), Central America, Colombia (more than 75), and Ecuador (at least 40). Fewer live in eastern and central South America (for example, less than 20 species are known from huge Brazil), Contiguous United States (1 native species), and the Lesser Antilles (about 25 species in total, with 1–2 species on each island). However, the Lesser Antilles are relatively rich compared to their very small land area and their species are all highly localized endemics, each only found on one or a few diminutive islands. In South America, the diversity is considerably higher west of the Andes (Tumbes-Chocó-Magdalena region) than east (Amazon basin), as well illustrated in Ecuador where about 2/3 of the anole species live in the former region and 1/3 in the latter.

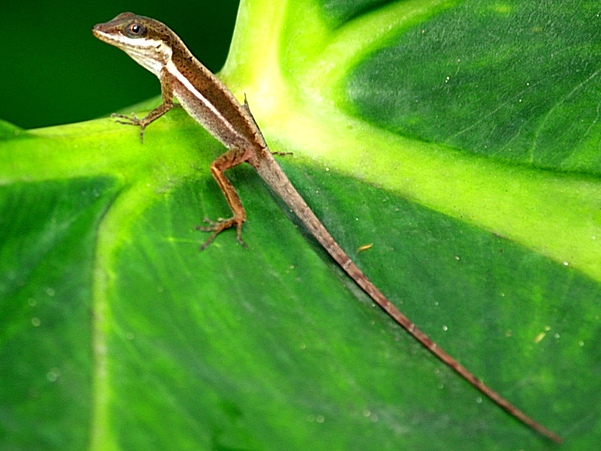
Puerto Rican bush anole, one of sixteen anole species from Puerto Rico and the Virgin Islands

The only species native to the contiguous United States is the Carolina (or green) anole, which ranges as far west as central Texas, and north to Oklahoma, Tennessee and Virginia. Its northern limit is likely related to cold winter temperatures. Several anole species have been introduced to the contiguous US, mostly Florida, but also other Gulf Coast states and California. The most prevalent of these introductions is the brown anole. In contrast to the contiguous United States, Puerto Rico and the Virgin Islands are home to 16 native species, all endemic.

Anoles inhabit a wide range of habitats, from highlands (up to at least 3,750 m or 12,300 ft above sea level) to the coast, and rainforest to desert scrub. A few live in limestone karst habitats and at least two of these, the Cuban cave anole and Mexican cave anole, will enter caves, sometimes occurring as much as 20 m (65 ft) from the entrance. Some species live close to humans and may use fences or walls of building as perches, even inhabiting gardens or trees along roads in large cities like Miami. Most anoles are arboreal or semi-arboreal, but there are also terrestrial and semiaquatic species. They are often, especially in the Caribbean, grouped into six ecomorphs—crown giant, trunk crown, trunk, trunk ground, twig, and grass bush—that inhabit specific niches. Other less widely used groups are ground, ground bush, twig giant, saxicolous, and riparian (alternatively semi-aquatic). However, the species within each ecomorph group are not entirely alike and there are variations in the details of their niches, including both widespread generalists and more restricted specialists. The niche differentiation allows several anoles to inhabit the same locality, with up to 15 species at a single site.

== Appearance and behavior ==
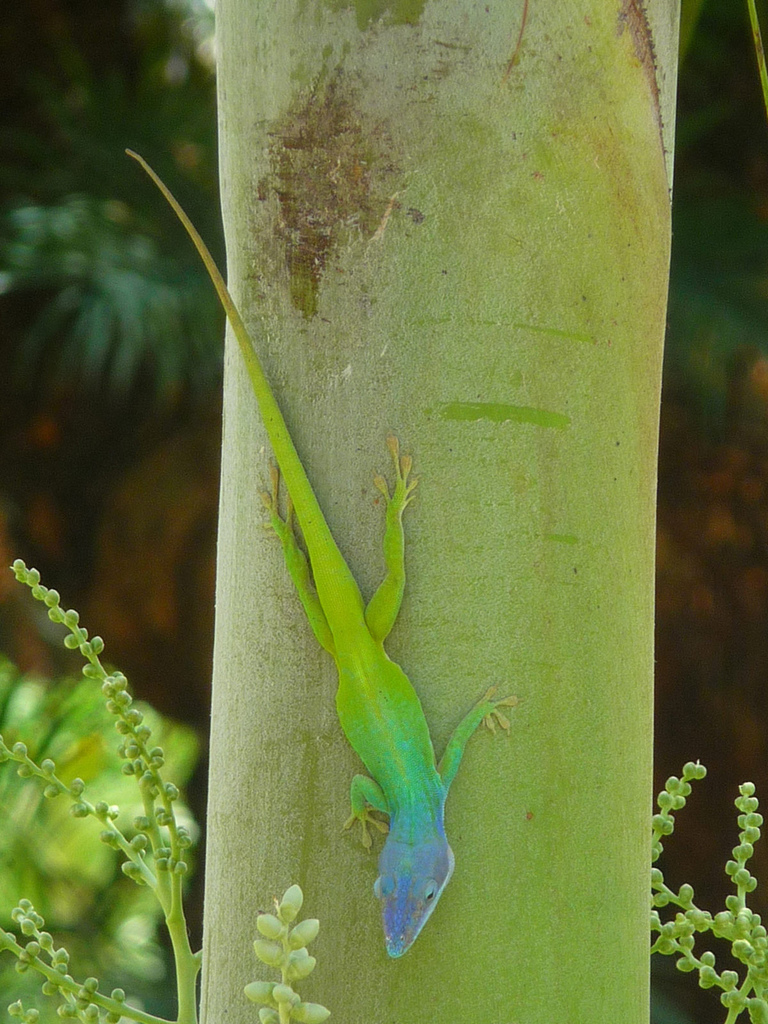
A male Allison's anole (female all green) showing the long tail and climbing ability typical of anoles

Anoles vary in size. Males generally reach a larger size than females, but in a few species it is the other way around. Adults of most anoles are between 4 and 8 cm (1.5–3 in) in snout-to-vent length, and between 10 and 20 cm (4–8 in) in total length, including the tail. In the smallest, the five-striped grass anole, the snout-to-vent length is about 3 and 3.5 cm (1.2 and 1.4 in) in females and males respectively, but it is a relatively long-tailed species. There are several large species that are more than 10 cm (4 in) in snout-to-vent length. Males of the largest, the knight anole, reach up to about 19 cm (7.5 in) in snout-to-vent length, 51 cm (20 in) in total length, and 137 g (5 oz) in weight. There are both robust and gracile species, and the head shape varies from relatively broad to elongate.

The tail of anoles varies, but mostly it is longer than the snout-to-vent length. Depending on exact species it can range from slightly shorter to about three times the snout-to-vent. The Caribbean twig ecomorph anoles, proboscis anole and "Phenacosaurus" anoles have a prehensile tail. Semi-aquatic anoles tend to have relatively tall, vertically flattened tails that aid in swimming, and their skin has certain microstructures that make it hydrophobic, resulting in a thin film of air on the skin surface when submerged and preventing water from staying on when exiting the water.

Underneath an anole's toes are pads that have several to a dozen flaps of skin (adhesive lamellae) going horizontally and covered in microscopic hairlike protrusions (setae) that allow them to cling to many different surfaces, similar to but not quite as efficient as a gecko. Despite this similarity, they are very distantly related and the adaptions are the result of convergent evolution in the two groups. The extent of these structures and clinging ability varies, being more developed in anole species that live high in the tree canopy than ones living at lower levels. In one extreme are anoles that easily can run up windows. In the opposite end of the spectrum is the bulky anole of arid coastal Venezuela and adjacent Colombia, which is the only species completely lacking the specialized toe pad structures. The relative length of the limbs vary, mainly between different species, but to some extent also between different populations of a single species. This depends on things like the preferred perch size and whether there are ground-living predators in a habitat.

Despite having relatively small eyes, their primary sense is sight, which is excellent and in color. Their pupils are round or nearly round. The Guantanamo anole and Cuban cave anole have a transparent "window" in their lower eyelid, allowing them to see even with closed eyes, but why they have this adaption is unclear. Anoles have a good directional hearing, which is able to detect frequencies between 1000 and 7000 Hz and relatively low intensity sounds like the click of a camera.

Anoles are diurnal—active during the daytime—but can also be active during bright moonlit nights and may forage near artificial lights. Many species frequently bask in the sun to increase their temperature, but others are shade-living and do not.

=== Colors ===
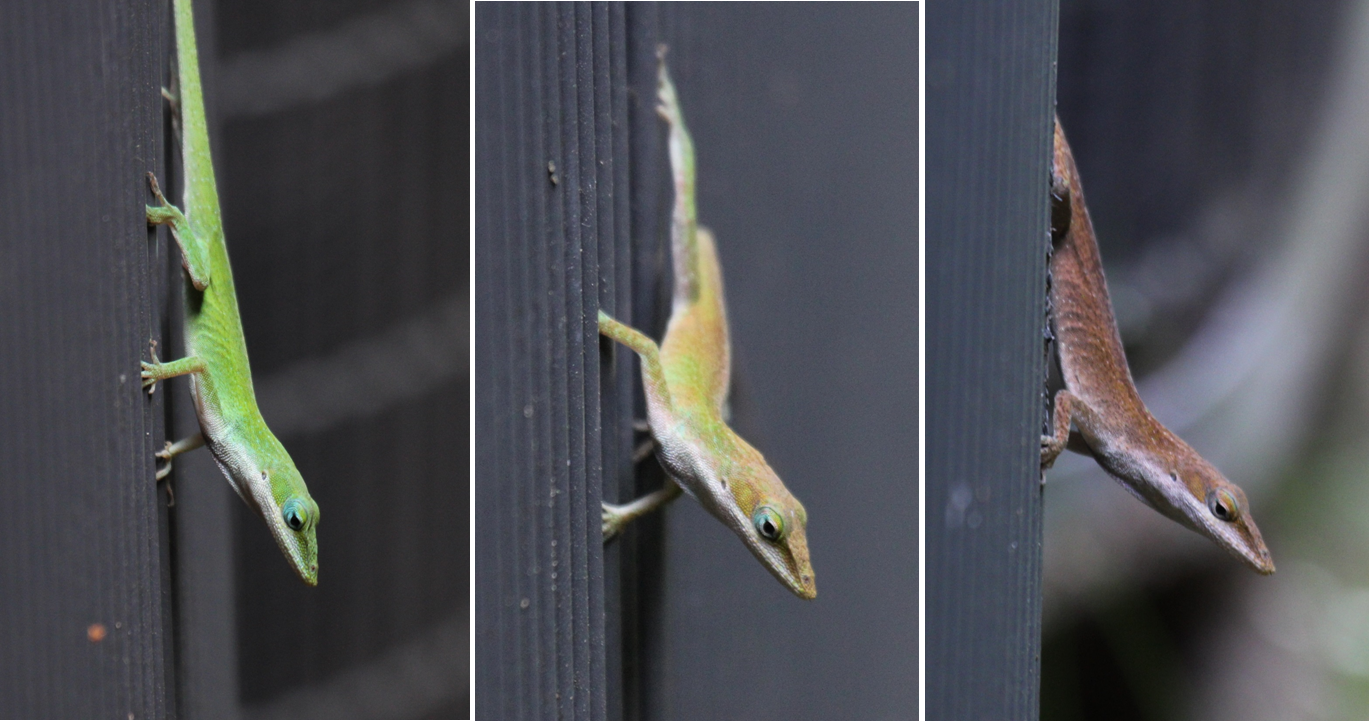
A Carolina anole changing from green to brown over the course of a few minutes

Most anoles are brownish or green, but there are extensive variations depending on the exact species. The majority can change their color depending on things like emotions (for example, aggression or stress), activity level, levels of light and as a social signal (for example, displaying dominance), but evidence showing that they do it in response to the color of the background (camouflage) is lacking. Whether they do it in response to temperature (thermoregulation) is less clear, with studies supporting it and contradicting it. The extent and variations of this color changing ability differ widely throughout the individual species. For example, the Carolina (or green) anole can change its color from a bright, leafy green to a dull brown color, while the brown anole can only change its shade, ranging from pale gray-brown to very dark brown. Even the distinct green-to-brown change in the Carolina anole can happen in only a few minutes. The colors are the result of their skin pigment cells, the chromatophores, of which they have three main types, but the change occurs only in the melanophores. When triggered by melanophore-stimulating hormone and other hormones, the melanosomes of the melanophores partially cover the other skin pigment cells, giving the anole a darker or browner color. In most cases stress results in a darker/browner color, but in the aquatic anole, a species that is dark brown with a barred pattern and light brown stripes on the sides of its body and head, stress results in paler brown upper parts and the stripes turn pale blue-green.

Their colors during the night when sleeping often differ distinctly from their colors during the day where awake. Among these are some species that otherwise do not drastically change their colors, including certain anoles that generally are brown during the day changing to greenish or whitish when sleeping at night, and certain anoles that generally are green during the day changing to brown when sleeping at night.

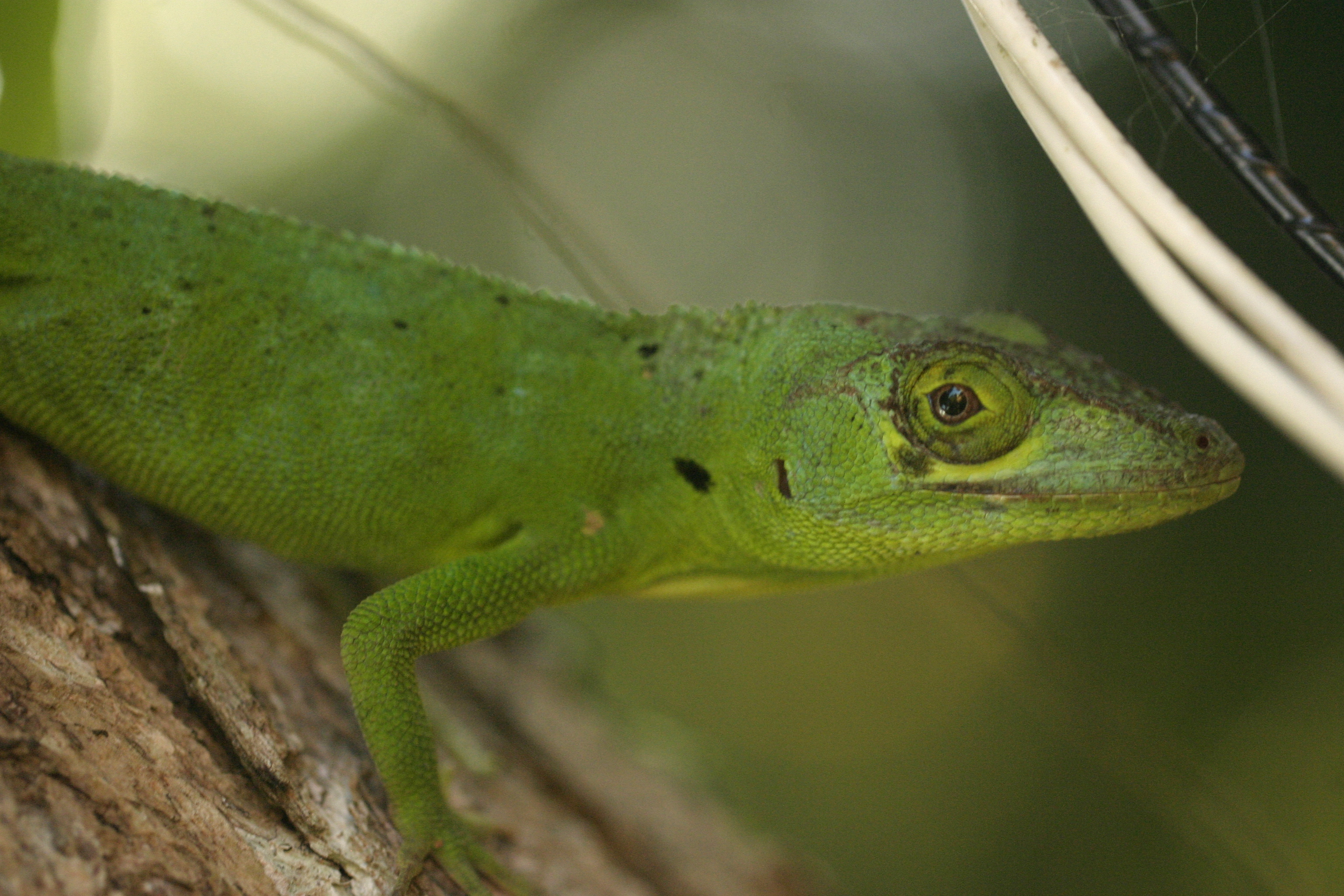
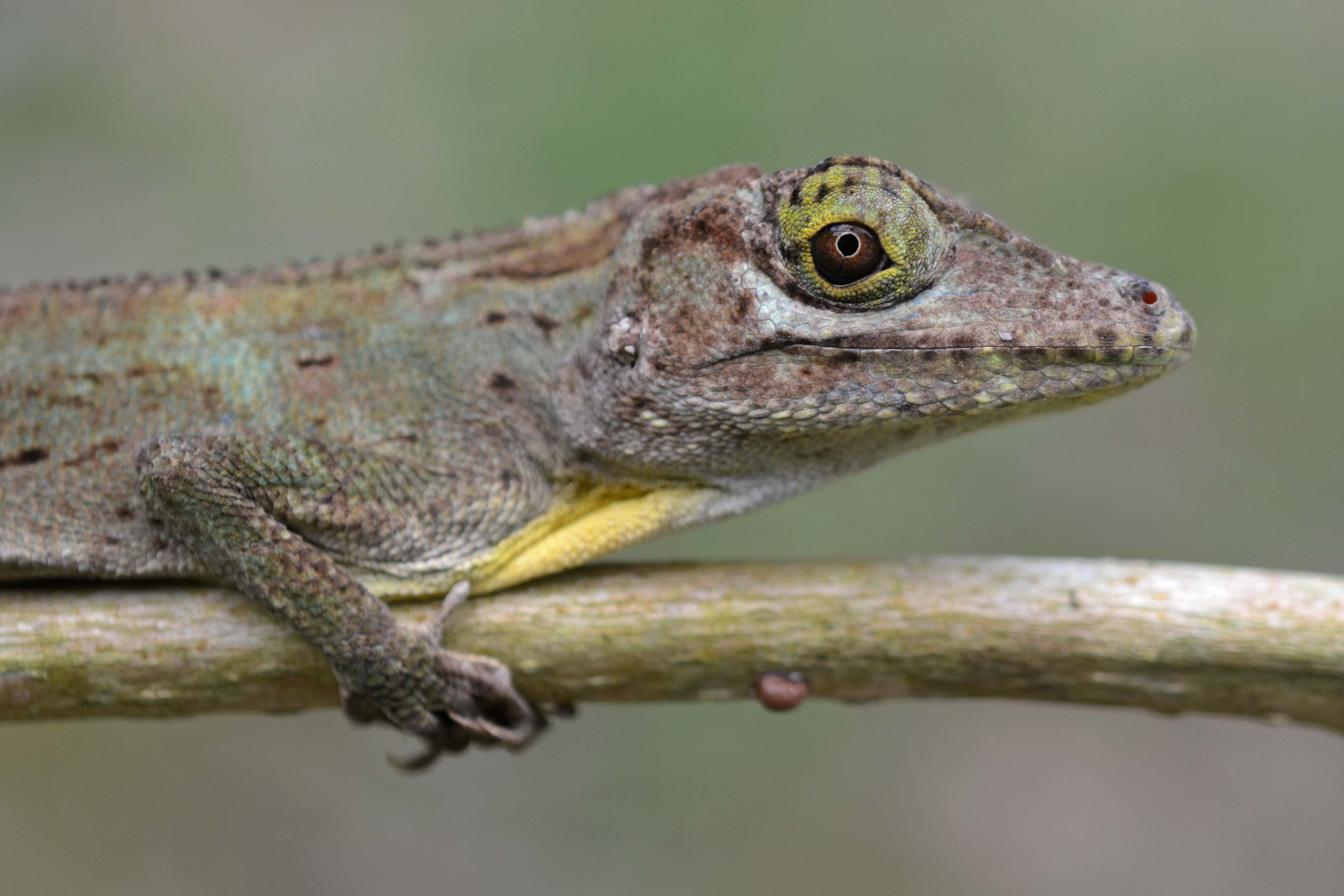
Adult Puerto Rican giant anoles are usually green, but an uncommon morph (not the result of color change) is gray-brown, as are all young

Disregarding color change, minor individual variations in the basic color and pattern, mostly related to sex or age, are common. In some anole species this variation is more pronounced and not only related to sex and age. An example of this is the basic color of the Cayman blue-throated anole, which varies geographically, roughly matching the main habitat at a location. In others it occurs at the same location. This includes the extensive individual variations in the Guadeloupean anole, which however also shows some geographic variations, but possibly not consistent enough (due in part to clines) to make the typically recognized subspecies valid. In the Puerto Rican giant anole, a species only able to perform minor color changes (essentially lightness/darkness), juveniles are gray-brown and adults typically green, but an uncommon morph maintains a gray-brown color into adulthood. Similarly, rare morphs of the usually green Carolina anole lack certain pigment cells, giving them a mainly turquoise-blue or yellow color.

=== Dewlap ===
Dewlap differences (males, except where noted)

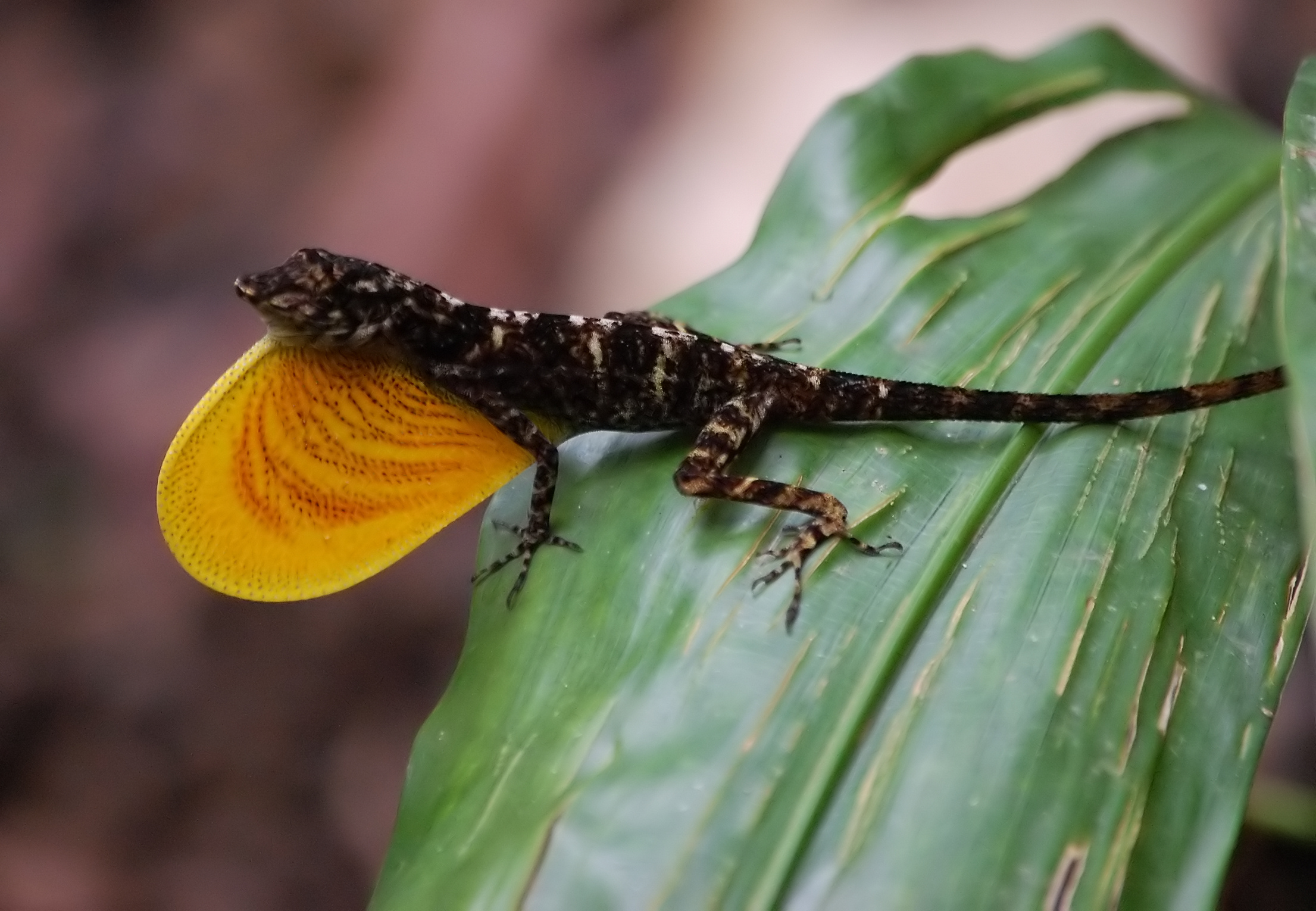
Many-scaled anole

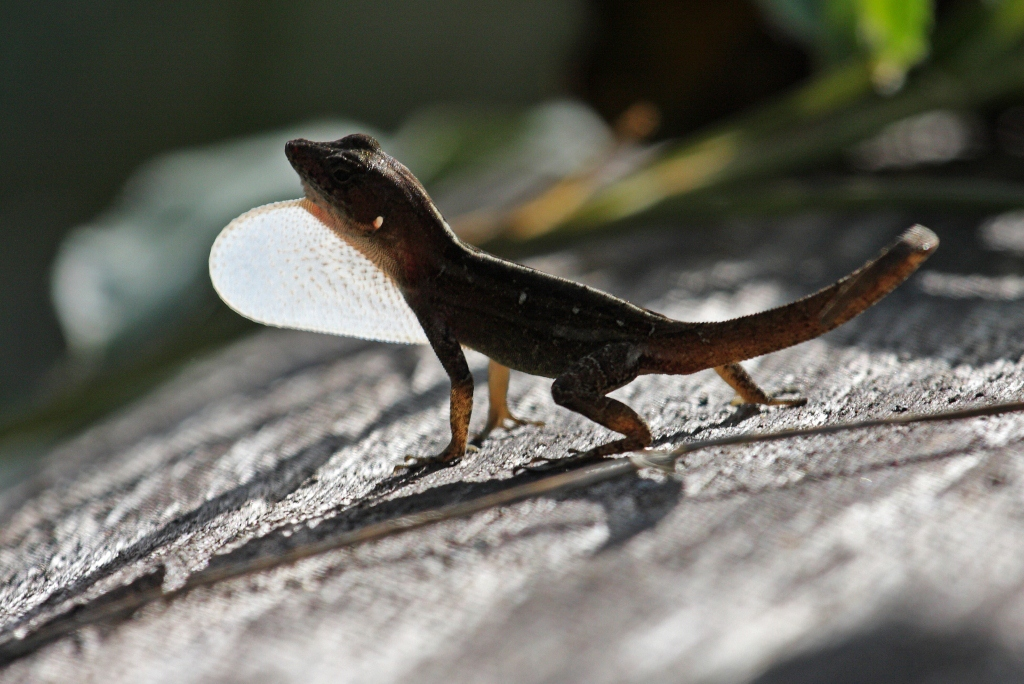
Habana anole

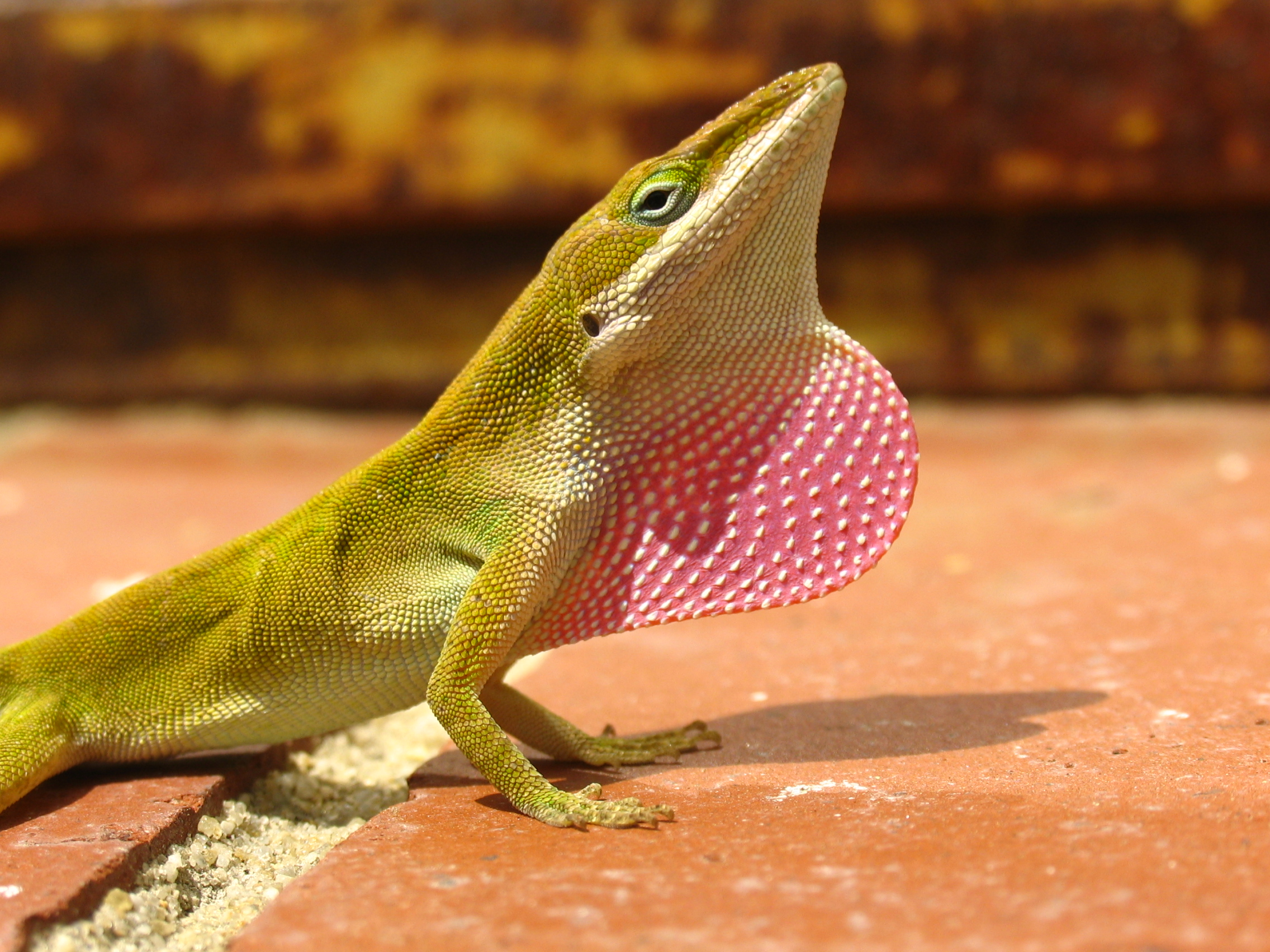
Carolina (or green) anole

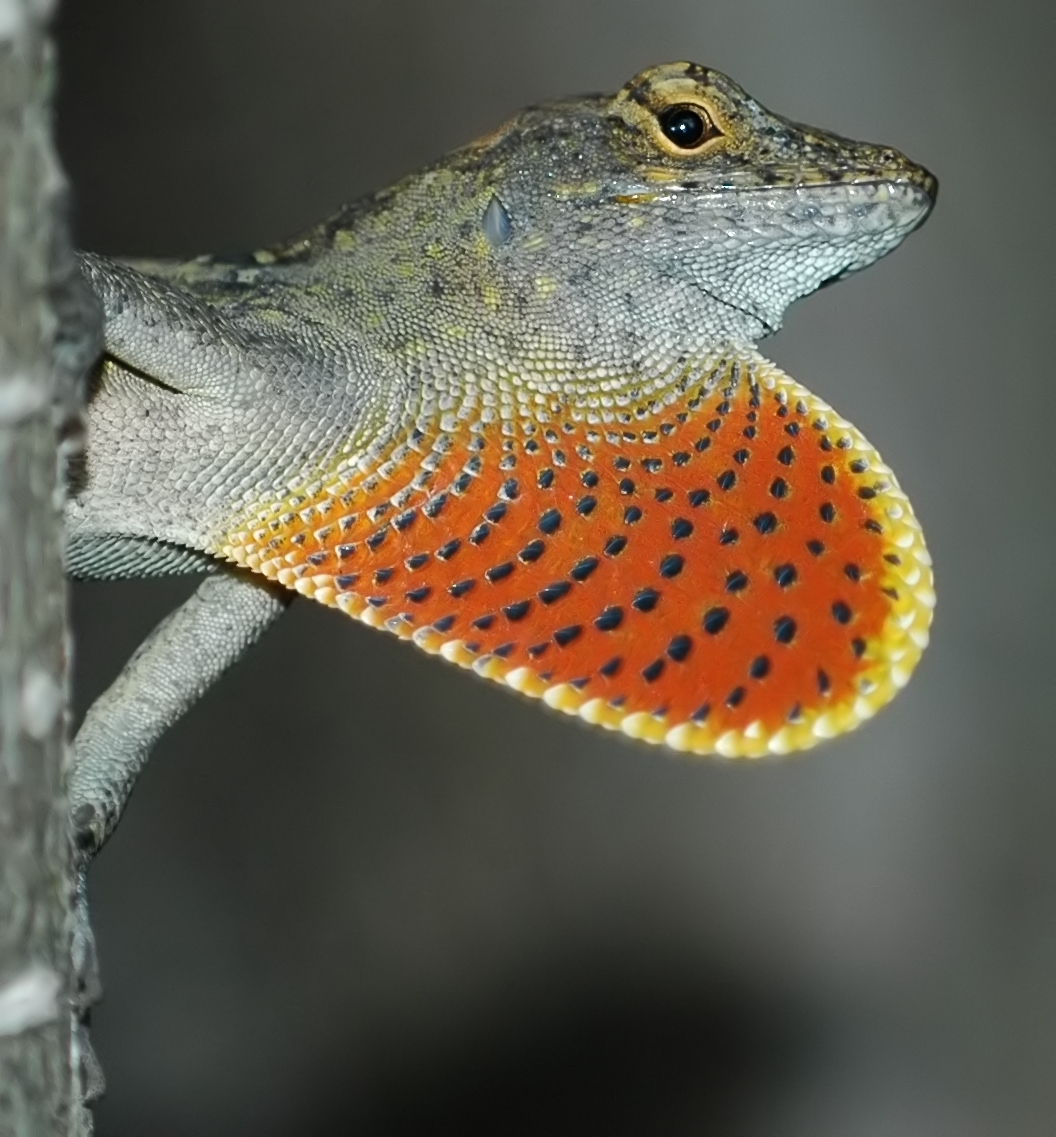
Brown anole

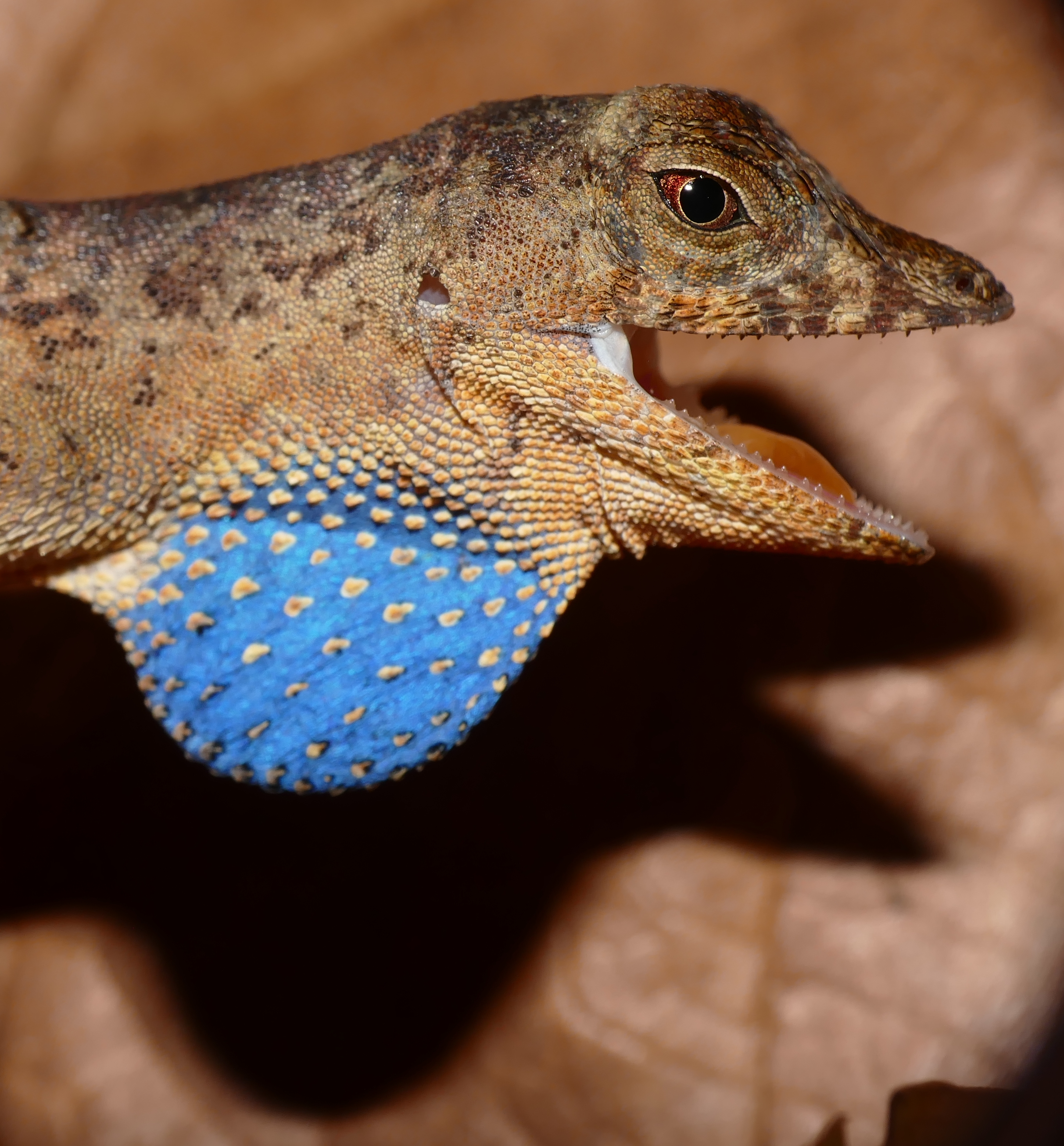
Goldenscale anole

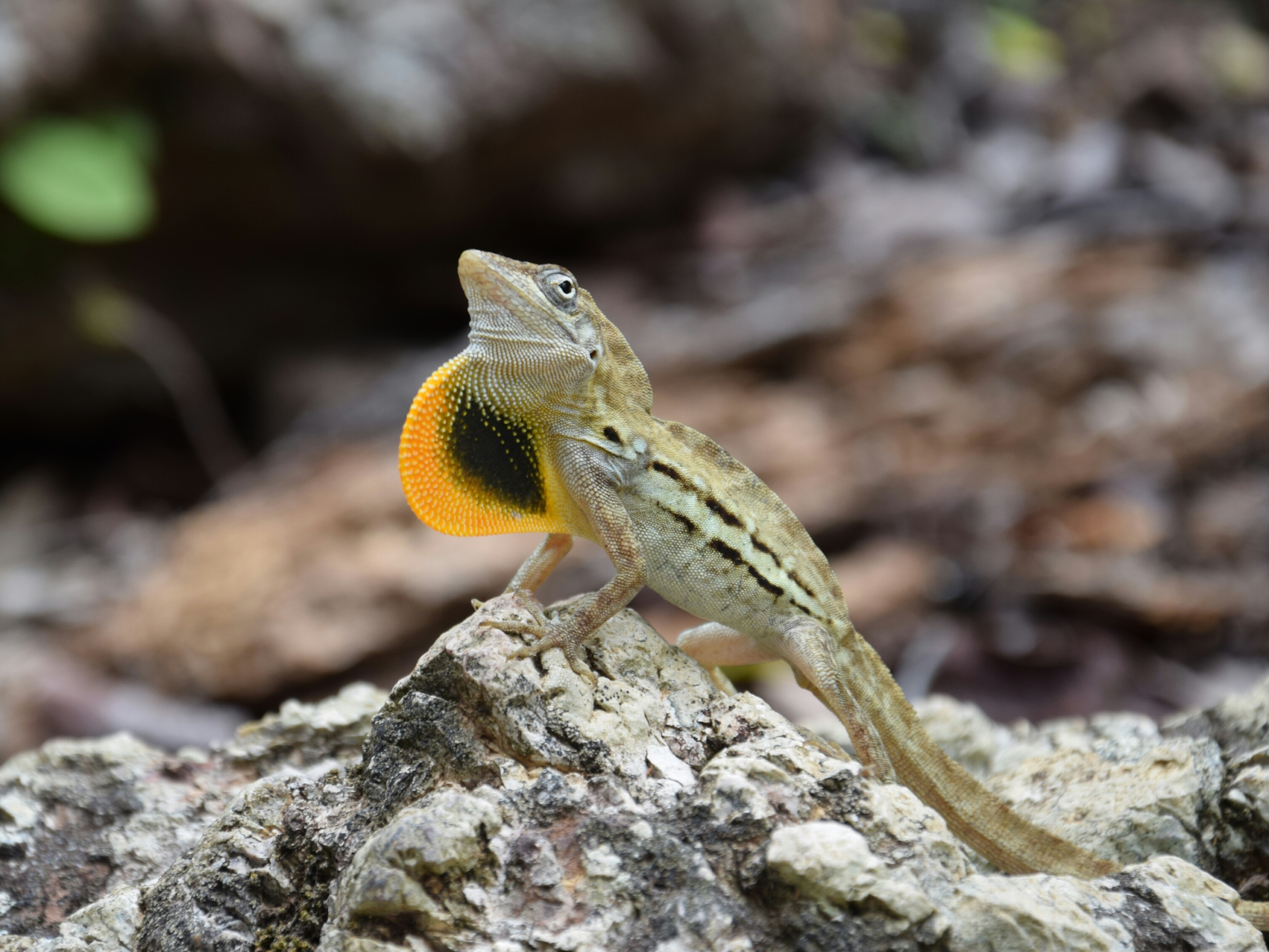
Striped anole

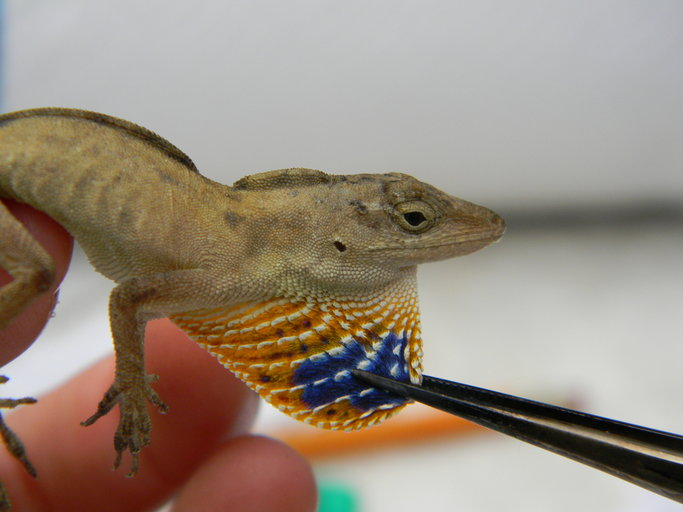
Silky anole

Aquatic anole, opening and closing dewlap

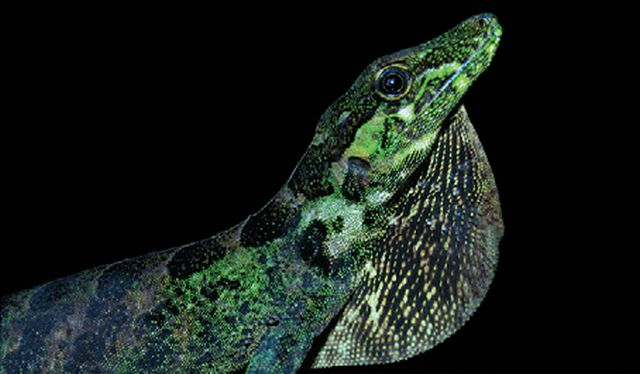
Fitch's anole, female (dewlap larger and brownish-yellow in male)

Most—but not all—anole species have dewlaps, made of erectile cartilage (modified from the hyoid) and covered in skin, that extend from their throat areas. When not in use and closed it lies inconspicuously along the throat and chest. The size, shape, color and pattern of the dewlap vary extensively depending on species, and often it differs between the sexes, being smaller (in some absent) or less colorful in females. In a few species, including the Carolina, bark, Cochran's gianthead and slender anoles, it varies geographically in color depending on subspecies or morph. Very locally, distinct morphs of a single species that differ in dewlap colors (not just differences between sexes) may occur together. In addition to colors that are visible to humans, dewlaps can have ultraviolet reflectance, which is visible to anoles. The striped anole is the only species where it is asymmetrically colored, being brighter on one side than the other. In some species even juveniles have a dewlap. The West Cuban and Cuban stream anoles are the only where both sexes lack a dewlap, but it is reduced and diminutive in about a dozen other species.

The dewlap serves as a signal for attracting partners, territoriality, deterring predators and communicating condition. When several anoles live together the species almost always differ in their dewlap, indicating that it plays a role in species recognition. Studies however reveal a more complex pattern: The bark anole and short nosed anole species complex (which includes the Webster's and Cochran's gianthead anoles) are closely related and both vary in their dewlap color. In places where their ranges overlap their dewlaps often differ and there is little hybridization, but in some locations their dewlaps are alike. Where alike there can be higher levels of hybridization (indicating that they are more likely to confuse each other) or levels can be as low as regions where they differ (indicating that something else allows them to separate each other). Another example is the red-fanned stout and large-headed anoles, which are sister species that overlap in range and are very similar except for their dewlap color. They are highly aggressive to individuals of their own species, but not the other. When one species has its dewlap color modified to resemble the other, only a relatively minor or no increase in aggression occurs, indicating that they still can separate each other.

Several other Iguania genera, Draco, Otocryptis, Polychrus, Sarada and Sitana, have evolved relatively large, movable dewlaps independently of the anoles.

=== Sexual dimorphism ===
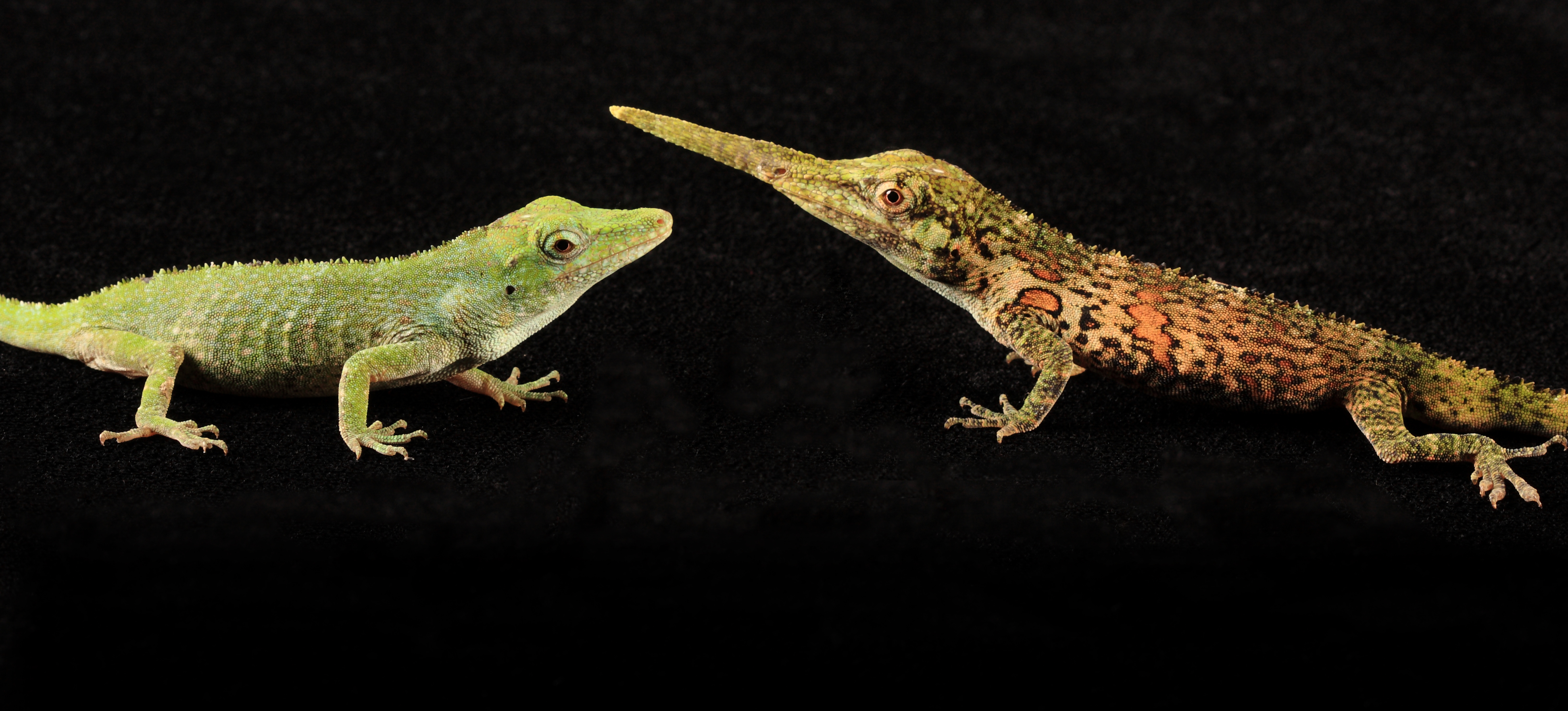
The nose differs between the sexes in the unusual proboscis anole (male with proboscis)

In some anoles the sexes are very similar and difficult to separate under normal viewing conditions, but most species exhibit clear sexual dimorphism, which allows one to fairly easily discern between adult males and females. In a few species the female is slightly larger than the male, but in others the sexes are about the same size. However, in most the males are larger, in some more than three times the mass of females. This size difference can result in differences in the microhabitat (for example, males using larger branches than females) and feeding (males on average eating large prey) between the sexes of a single species. Males of some species have proportionally far longer heads than females, but in others it is nearly alike. The crest along the nape, back and/or tail is larger in the males. In species with tall crests this difference can be obvious, but in small-crested species it is often inconspicuous and easily overlooked, especially when not raised. The dewlap is often larger in males; in some species only the male has a dewlap. In a few there are differences in the shape of the nose, but this is only known to be prominent in the proboscis and leaf-nosed anoles, which both have long-nosed males and more normal looking females (it is likely that something similar can be seen in smooth anole, but the female of that species is still unknown). A less obvious difference between anole sexes is the enlarged post-cloacal scales in males.

The males of many species are overall more brightly colored, while females are duller, more cryptic, and sometimes their upperparts have striped or lined patterns that serve to break up the outline of the anole. In general, the juvenile colors and pattern resemble those of the adult female. The dewlap tends to be more colorful in males, with clear differences being common among anoles of the mainland of the Americas and comparatively rarer in the Caribbean species.

=== Territoriality and breeding ===
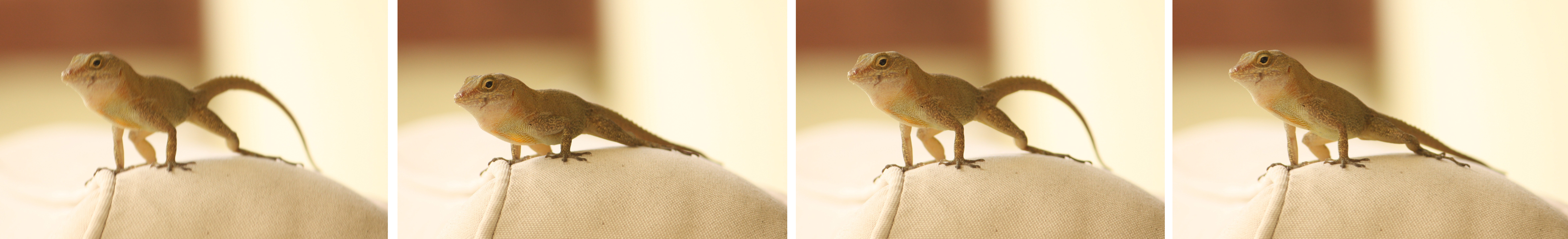
Puerto Rican crested anole exhibiting push-up behavior

Two male Carolina anoles fighting over territory at the top of a fence post

Almost all anole species are highly territorial, at least the males, but a few exceptions do exist, including the rock-living Agassiz's and Taylor's anoles where males do not defend a territory, and the grass anole where dominant males accept subordinant non-territorial males within their territory. Territorial anoles will fan their dewlap, bob their head, perform "push-ups", raise their crest and do a wide range of other behaviors to scare away potential competitors. If this does not scare off the intruder, a fight proceeds in which the two anoles attempt to bite each other. During fights some species of anoles are known to vocalize. In addition to the behaviors indicating dominance, anoles may move their head up and down in a head-nod display (not to be confused with the head-bob display where entire frontal part of body is moved through "push-ups"), which is a submissive sign. Females maintain a feeding territory. Males maintain a larger breeding territory, which overlaps with the feeding territory of one or several females. The home range is generally larger in males than in females, and larger in large anole species than in smaller. In a very small species like the Bahoruco long-snouted anole the home range can be as little is about 1.5 m^{2} (16 ft^{2}) and 2.3 m^{2} (25 ft^{2}) in a female and male, compared to a large species like the knight anole where they average about 630 m^{2} (6,800 ft^{2}) and 650 m^{2} (7,000 ft^{2}). If removed from its territory an anole will usually be able to find its way back home in a relatively short time, but exactly how they do this is unclear. Generally being highly solitary animals, anoles will only infrequently congregate, but in colder regions individuals may rest adjacent to each other in groups during the winter.

In addition to differences in the appearance of the dewlap, the frequency of the dewlap opening/closing and the frequency and amplitude of the head bobbing differ between species, allowing them to separate each other. Territoriality is typically aimed at other individuals of the same species, but in a few cases it is also directed towards other anoles, as can be seen between the crested and Cook's anoles. Unlike most anoles with widely overlapping ranges, these two inhabit very similar niches and directly compete for resources.

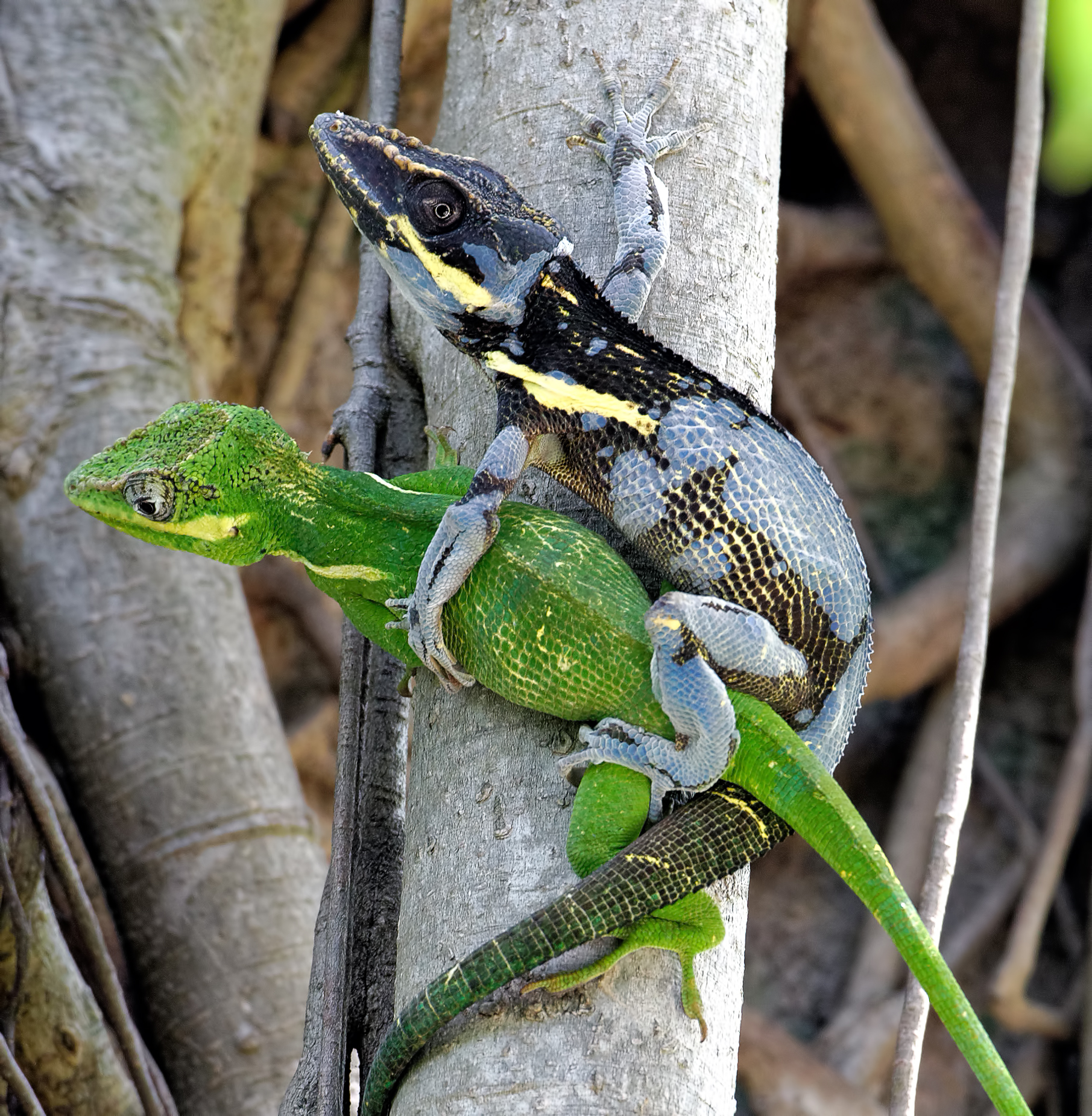
Mating knight anoles. The male has turned dark from the normal green color. The whitish-gray patches are old skin that is in the process of being shed

The breeding period varies. In species or populations living in highly seasonal regions it is generally relatively short, typically during the wet season. It is prolonged, often even year-round, in species or populations living in regions with less distinct seasons. In some species where it is year-round the egg production is however higher during the rainy season than the dry season, and in many where it is prolonged but not year-round, it begins in the spring and ends in the fall. Males attract and court females by performing a range of behaviors, often mirroring those used to scare away competitors, including extending their dewlap and bobbing their heads. During mating the male inserts one of his hemipenes into the female's cloaca, fertilizing the egg inside the oviduct. The female may mate with multiple males, but is also able to store sperm inside her body for fertilization of eggs several months after mating. A female anole produces an egg in each ovary, meaning that when one is maturing in one of her follicles the yolk of another is forming in the other. The white shell only forms when the egg has been fertilized and females will sometimes lay infertile, unshelled yellowish eggs known as "slugs". The female lays one (occasionally two) eggs per time, which typically is placed casually on the ground among leaf-litter, under debris, logs or rocks, or in a small hole. In some species it is placed at higher levels in a bromeliad, tree hole or rock crevice. A small number of species lay their eggs together, forming a communal nest. Among these is the unusual Cuban cave anole where as many as 25 eggs may be glued together in a small cavity on the side of a cave wall. A nest that contained eggs from the bay anole and the geckos Sphaerodactylus armasi and Tarentola crombiei represents the only known multi-species communal nest for an anole and the only known communal nest involving more than one family of lizard. Although typically only laying a single egg per time (clutch), females of many anole species can lay an egg every five days to four weeks. Some only have a single clutch per year, while other species may have as many as 20 on average. Depending on species, anole eggs hatch after about 30–70 days.

=== Feeding ===
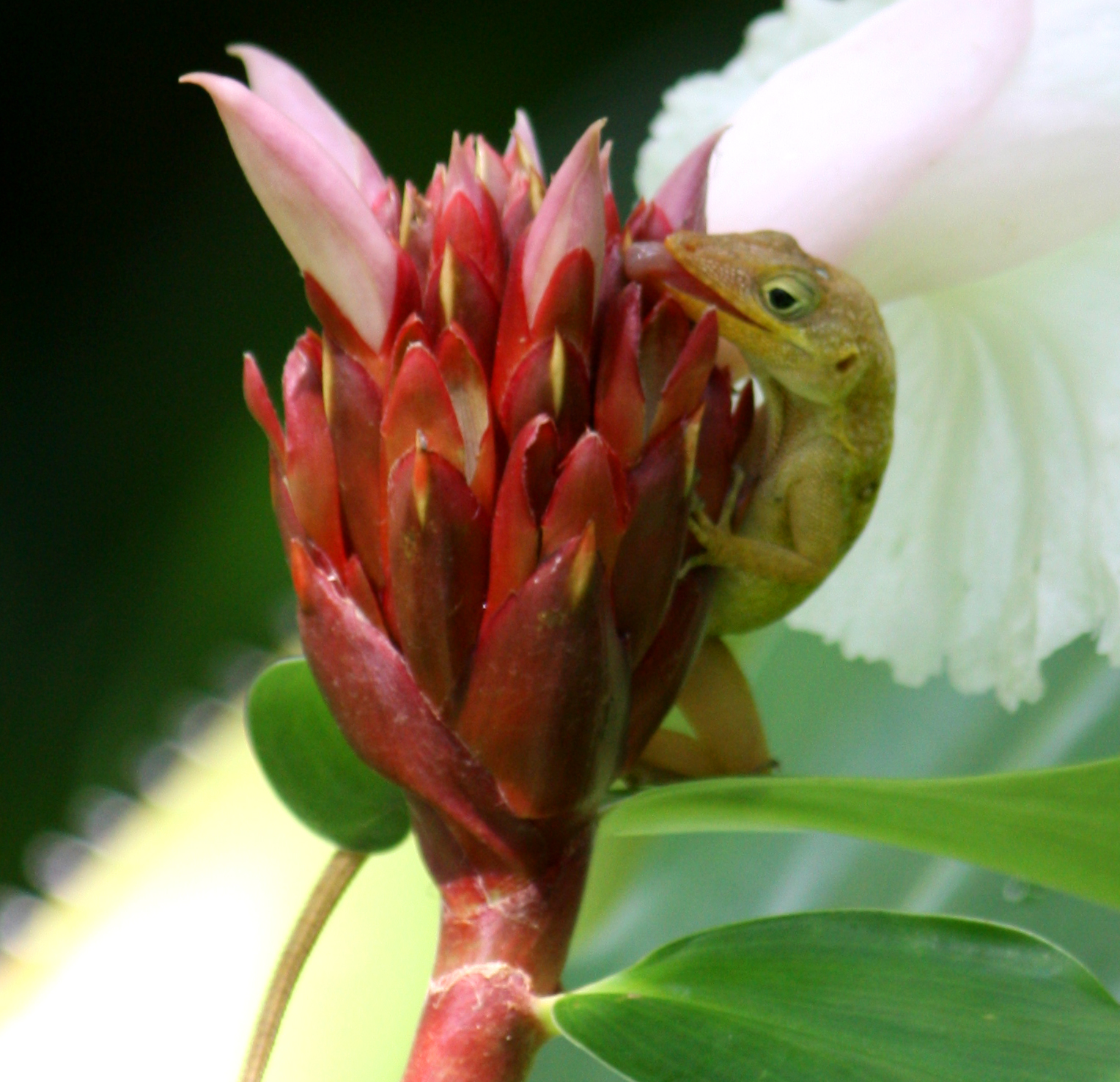
Dominican anole feeding on nectar

Anoles are opportunistic feeders, and may attempt to eat any attractive meal that is of the right size. They primarily feed on insects like flies, grasshoppers, crickets, caterpillars, moths, butterflies, beetles and ants, and arachnids like spiders. Several species will also eat small vertebrates such as mice, small birds (including nestlings), lizards (including other anole species and Cannibalism of their own) and frogs. The slow-moving Cuban false chameleon anoles ("Chamaeleolis") are specialized snail-eaters, and a few semi-aquatic species like the Cuban stream anole may catch prey in water such as shrimp and small fish. In some species the average prey-size varies with the individual anole's size, age and sex, with juvenile anoles eating the smallest prey, adult females taking intermediate-sized prey and adult males the largest prey. In other species there are no clear differences in the preferred prey size, regardless of an individual's size and sex.

Hunting is done by sight, and they generally show a strong preference for moving prey over non-moving. Many will chase down or sneak up to a potential prey item, while others are sit-and-wait predators that pounce on prey when it gets close to the anole. Anoles have numerous small, sharp and pointed teeth that allow them to efficiently grab their prey. They are heterodonts with each tooth in the frontal half of the jaw having a single tip (unicuspid) and each in the rear half having three tips (tricuspid); one in the middle and a smaller behind and in front of it. Unusually, the Cuban false chameleon anoles have enlarged and blunt, molar-like teeth in the rear part of their jaw, allowing them to crush the shells of their snail prey.

In addition to animal prey, many anole species will take plant material, notably fruits, flowers and nectar, and overall they are best described as omnivorous. Some fruit-eating species, like the knight anole, may function as seed dispersers. Anoles have been recorded drinking sweetened water from hummingbird feeders. Anoles are vulnerable to drying out and generally need access to water for drinking, like dew or rain on leaves, although some species are less susceptible to water loss than others and are able to live in relatively arid places.

=== Predator avoidance and deterrence ===
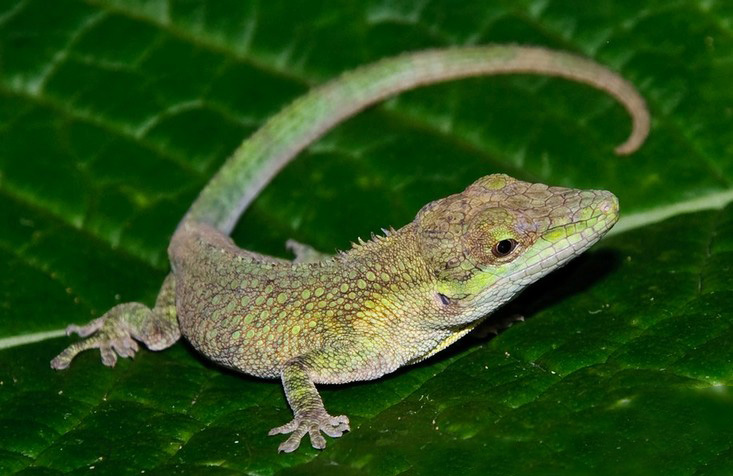
The flat Andes anole avoids detection by moving slowly and it will often coordinate its movements with the wind

A wide range of animals will eat anoles, such as large spiders, centipedes, predatory katydids, snakes, large frogs, lizards, birds, monkeys, bats and carnivoran mammals. At least in part of their range, snakes may be the most significant predator of anoles. For example, the Caribbean Alsophis and Borikenophis racers, and the Mexican, Central American and South American Oxybelis vine snakes feed mostly on lizards like anoles. Some reptile-eating snakes have a specialized venom that has little effect on humans, but it rapidly kills an anole. On some Caribbean Islands anoles make up as much as 40–75% of the diet of American kestrels. Large anoles may eat smaller individuals of other anole species and cannibalism—eating smaller individuals of their own species—is also widespread. There is a documented case of a small anole being captured and killed by an outside potted Venus flytrap plant.

Anoles mainly detect potential enemies by sight, but their hearing range also closely matches the typical vocal range of birds. If hearing a predatory bird, like a kestrel or hawk, they increase their vigilance. When hearing a non-predatory bird little or no change happens. Most anole species will try to escape from a predator by rapidly running or climbing away, but some will move to the opposite side of a tree trunk (facing away from the would-be attacker), jump to the ground from their perch, or freeze when disturbed, hoping the adversary does not spot it. Some anole species will show their fitness by displaying their dewlap when encountering a predator; the greater the endurance of the anole, the greater the display. Conversely, when suddenly forced to share their habitat with an efficient anole predator like the northern curly-tailed lizard (for example, if it is introduced to a place where formerly not present), the anoles may decrease the amplitude of their head bobbing, making them less conspicuous, and may become slower to emerge from hiding (less willing to take a risk) after having been scared by a predator. Slow-moving anoles, like the twig ecomorphs of the Caribbean and many Dactyloa species of mainland Central and South America, are generally cryptically colored and often coordinate their movements with the wind, resembling the surrounding vegetation. A few semi-aquatic species will attempt to escape from predators by diving into water or running bipedally across it, similar to basilisks. However, the anoles lack the specialized toe fringes that helps basilisks when doing this.

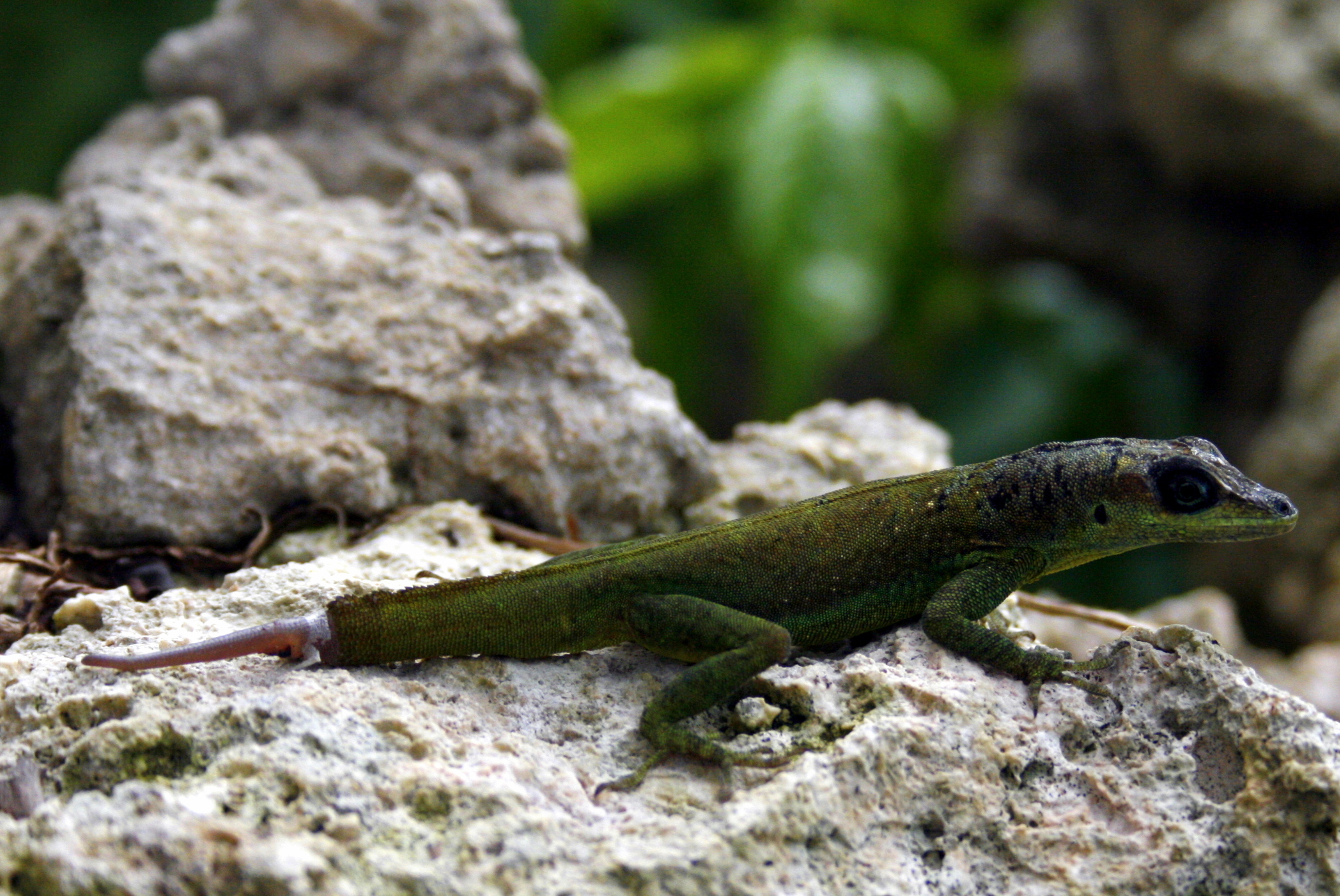
A Barbados anole with a partially regenerated tail

Anole tails often have the ability to break off at special segments, which is known as autotomy. The tail continues to wriggle for a period after detaching, attracting the attention of the predator and commonly allowing the anole to escape. The tail is regenerated, but it takes more than two months to complete this process. About two dozen anoles, including almost all members of the latifrons species group, all in the chamaeleonidae species group and the La Palma anole, do not have the ability to autotomize the tail. Like many other reptiles, Anoles can regrow their tail through a process called epimorphic regeneration. During epimorphosis, two structures are formed upon the loss of the tail: the wound epithelium and the blastema. The wound epithelium causes apical thickening and unique expressions of wound keratins, while a proliferation of a group of cells in the wound epithelium and an accumulation of mesenchymal-like cells contribute to the blastema. As the process continues, the blastema forms a cone-like shape, forming the new tail. Thereafter, the cells continue to differentiate, and the wound epithelium thins as the new tail continues to grow.

If caught or cornered, anoles will bite in self-defense. This can be relatively effective against some predators. When fighting back and biting, sometimes for as much as 20 minutes, Puerto Rican crested anoles escape from more than 1/3 of all attacks by Puerto Rican racer snakes. Some species of anoles will vocalize (typically growls, chirps or squeals) when caught.

== Evolution ==
The evolution of anoles has been widely studied, and they have been described as a "textbook example of adaptive radiation and convergent evolution". Especially the widespread convergent evolution seen in anoles living in the Greater Antilles has attracted the attention of scientists, and resulted in comparisons with the Darwin's finches of the Galápagos Islands, lemurs of Madagascar and cichlid fish in the African Great Lakes.

=== Ecomorphs and origin ===
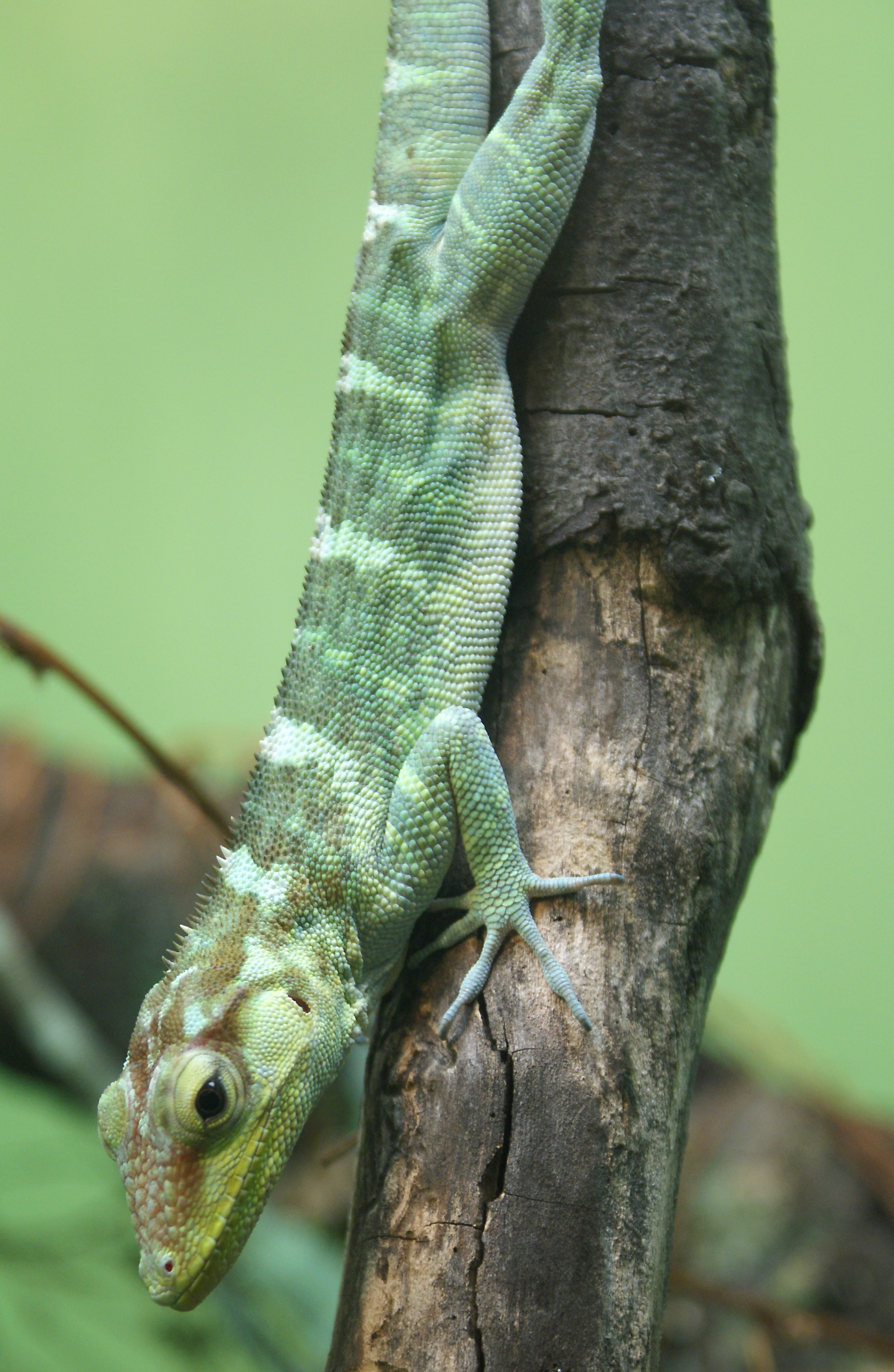
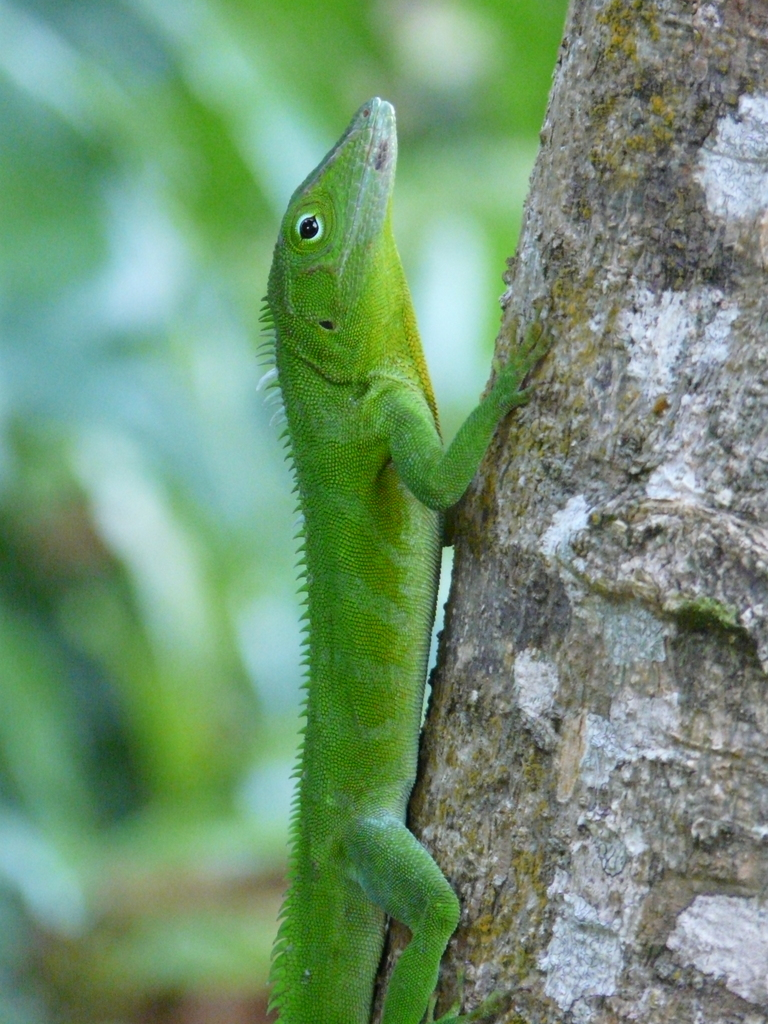
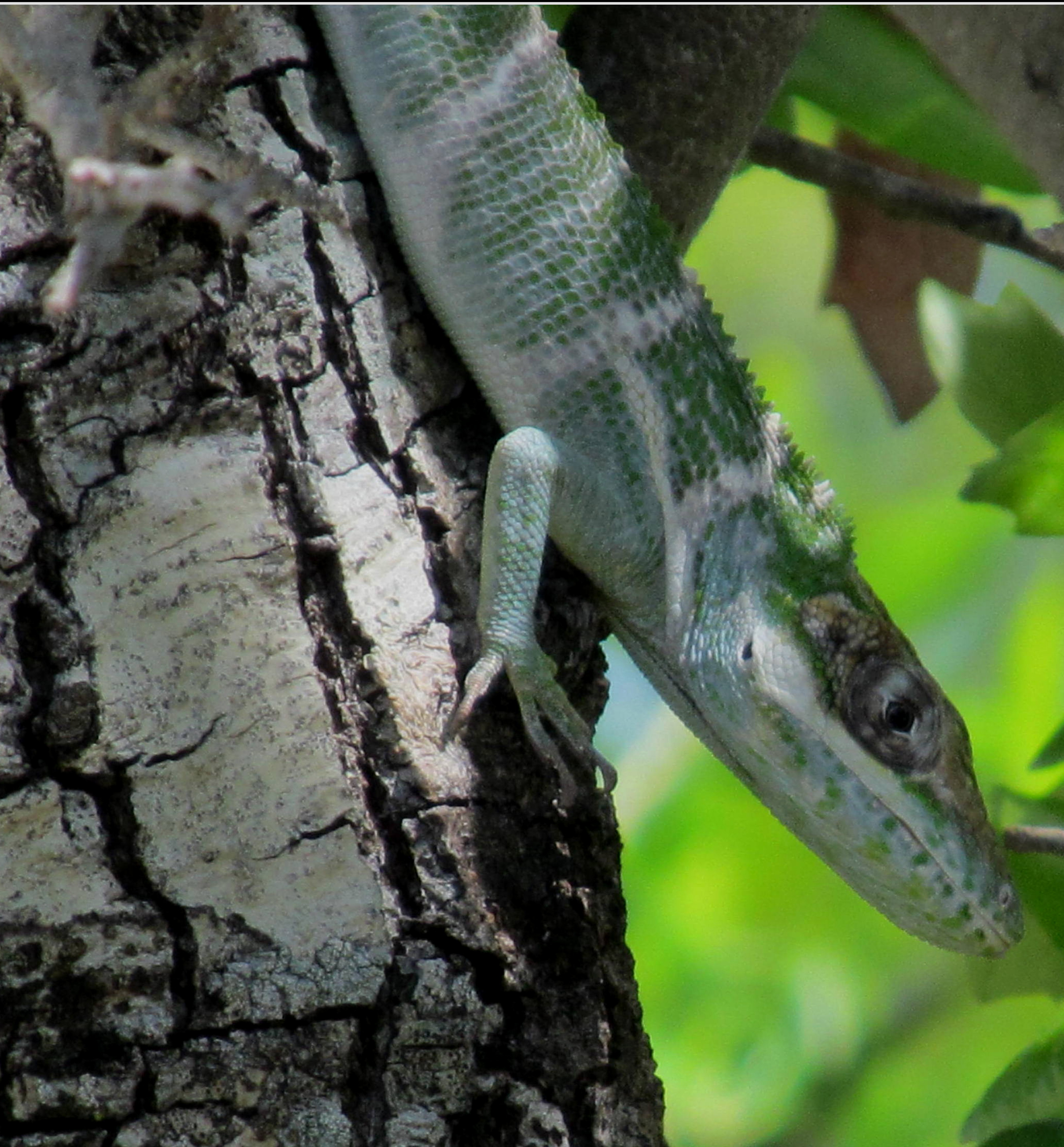
Haitian green (from Hispaniola), Jamaican giant and western giant anole (from Cuba) are all crown giant ecomorphs, but not closely related

On each major Greater Antillean Island (Cuba, Hispaniola, Puerto Rico and Jamaica), there are anole species that have adapted to specific niches and are referred to as ecomorphs: crown giant, trunk crown, trunk, trunk ground, twig and grass bush (a few additional, less widely used ecomorphs also exist). However, even within the Greater Antilles there are differences depending on island size and the amount of available habitats. The largest, Cuba and Hispaniola, have all six primary ecomorphs, while the smaller Puerto Rico and Jamaica have five and four respectively. Species living in a specific niche on each island tend to resemble each other in both appearance and behavior. For example, the Escambray twig anole of Cuba closely resembles the Puerto Rican twig and Jamaican twig anoles, as well as several species of twig ecomorphs from Hispaniola. Despite this they are not closely related and have adapted to their specific niche independently of each other. At least four of the six primary ecomorphs are of ancient origin as they have been documented in amber fossils from Hispaniola that are about 15–20 million years old (the two missing ecomorphs are crown giant and grass bush). Otherwise there are few known fossils, but early phylogenetic and immunological studies indicate that anoles originated 40–66 million years ago, first inhabitant Central or South America, and then came to the Caribbean (initially likely Cuba or Hispaniola). A more recent phylogenetic study, published in 2012, indicated that anoles originated in South America and diverged from other reptiles far earlier, about 95 million years ago. While a South American origin has been generally accepted, the very high age has been controversial and other studies published in 2011–2014 arrived at a lower age, estimating that anoles diverged from other reptiles 23–75, 53–72 or 81–83 million years ago, while a comprehensive study from 2017 estimated about 46–65 million years ago. This indicates that early anoles arrived on the Greater Antillean Islands in the Caribbean from the mainland of the Americas via rafting rather than overland via ancient (now submerged) land bridges. After arriving in the Caribbean they diversified into several new groups and one of these, the Norops lineage, later made its way back to mainland of the Americas.

=== Species and adaptability ===
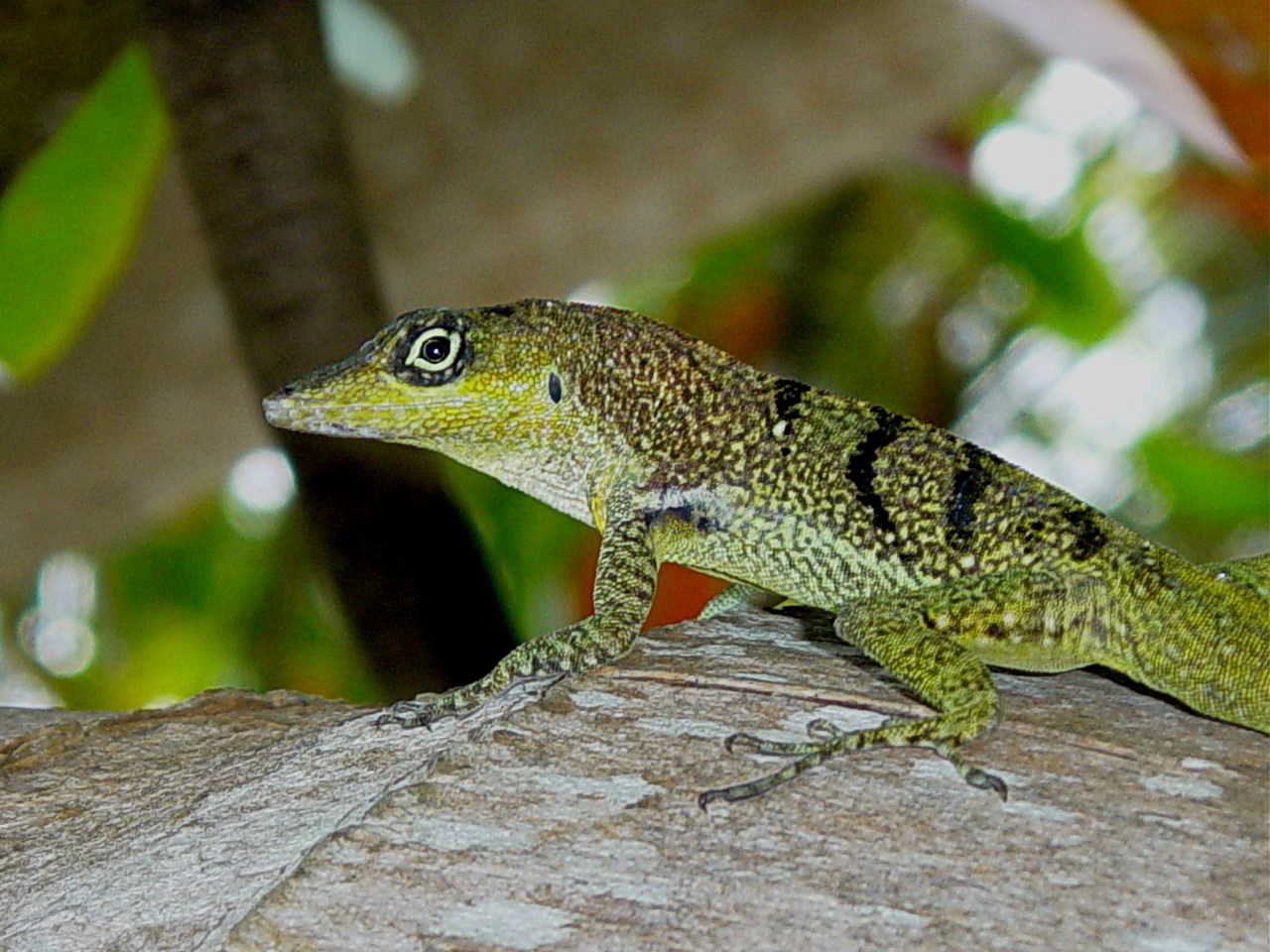
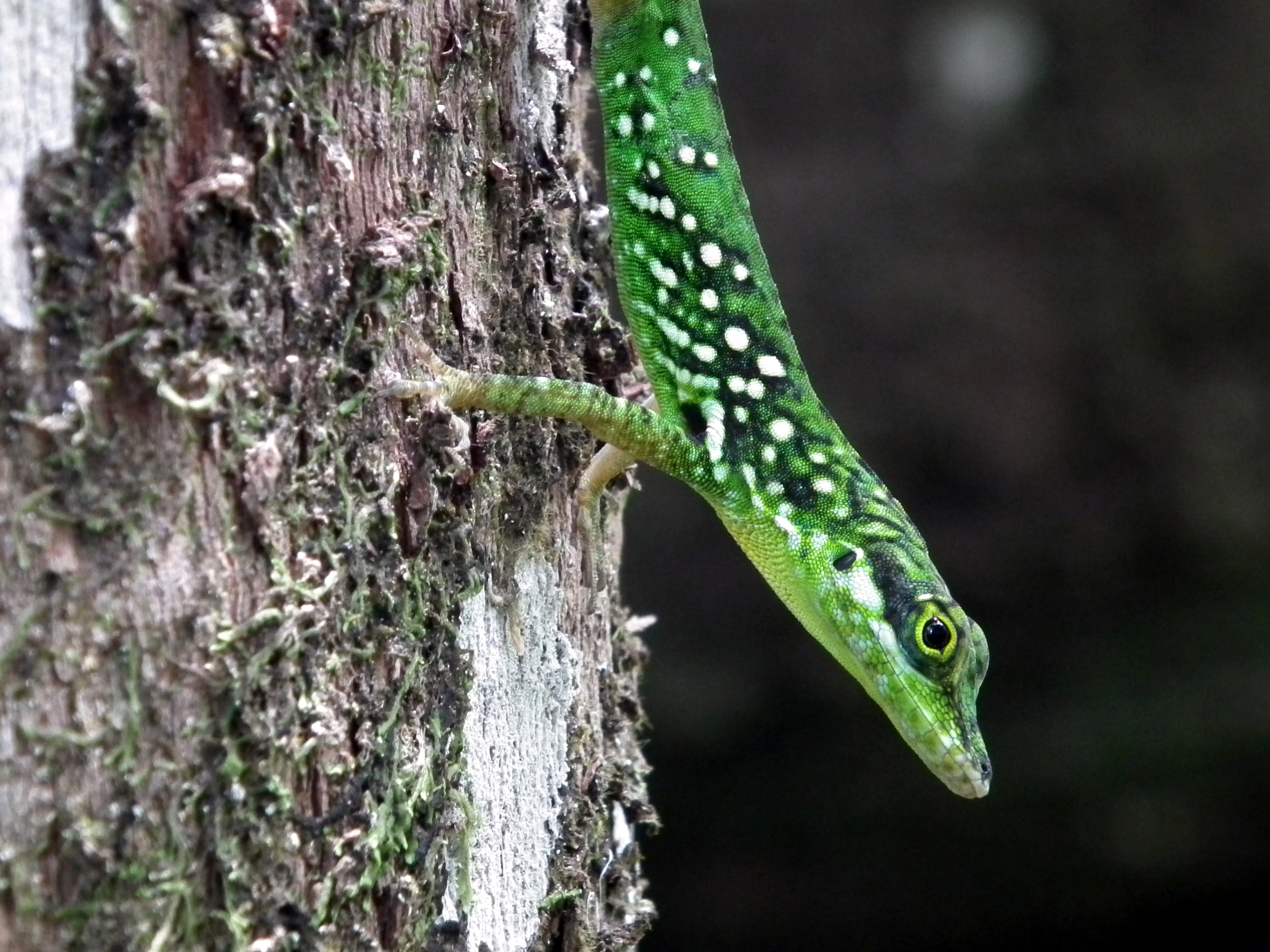
Despite being separated for millions of years and looking very different (xeric type on left, montane rainforest on right), the populations of the Martinique anole are not reproductively isolated
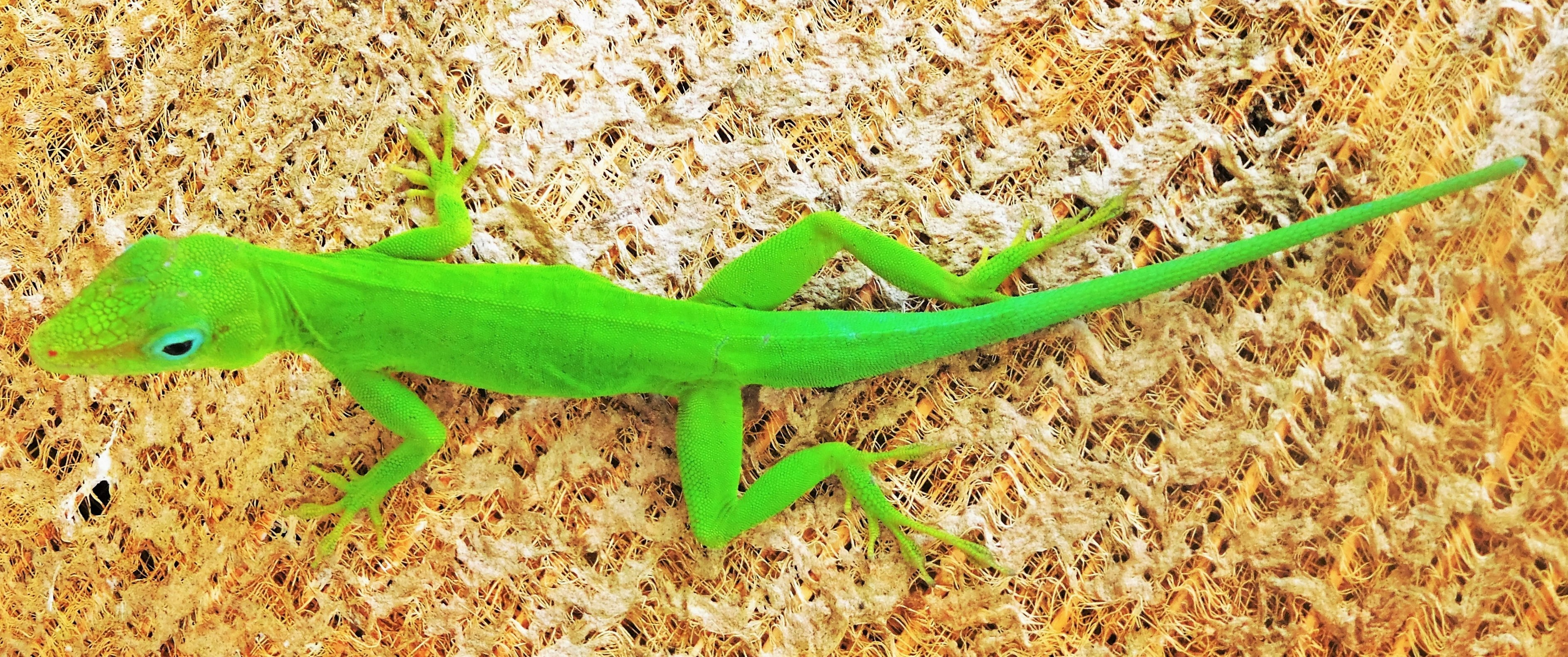
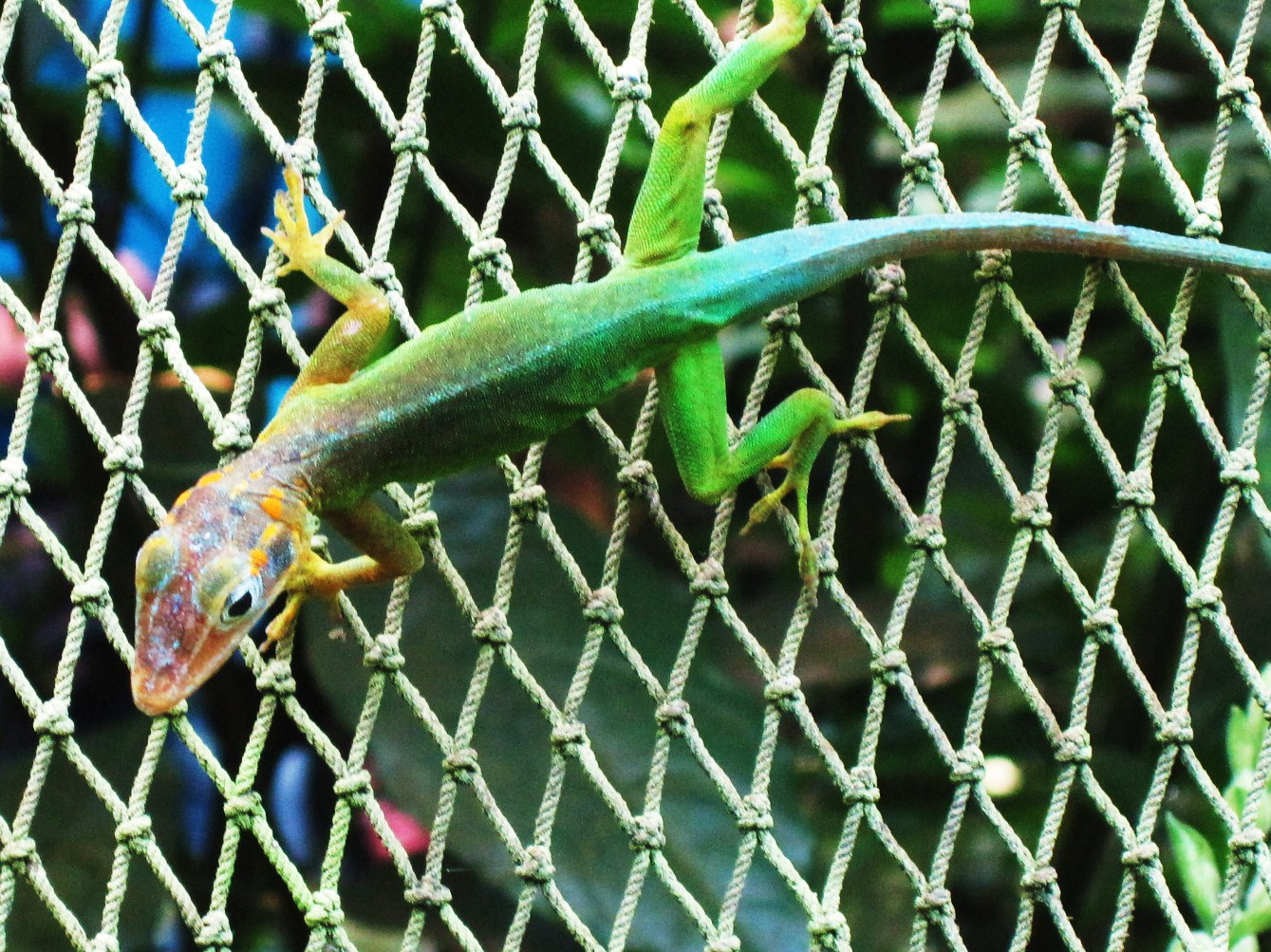
The Guadeloupean anole is highly variable (speciosus type above, nominate below), but studies indicate the subspecies are invalid today

Species level evolution in anoles can be very slow. Martinique originally consisted of four tiny islands, which then merged into a single as a result of uplifting. Anoles lived on each of the tiny ancient islands and were isolated six to eight million years ago. Despite this long separation, they did not experience allopatric speciation, as mixed couples of the different Martinique anole populations can successfully reproduce and remain part of a single species. The Barbados anole is part of the same group, but Barbados remains a separate, isolated island. The genetic divergence between the different Martinique anole populations is similar to that between other Lesser Antillean anoles consistently recognized as separate species. Another Lesser Antillean species, the Guadeloupean anole, has several distinct populations that generally are recognized as subspecies. However, Guadeloupean anoles exhibit high individual variability and the populations widely intergrade, something that possibly has been enhanced by habitat changes by humans (allowing populations to easier come into contact with each other) and translocations of individuals. This indicates that the subspecies are invalid today. Genetic studies confirm that strong assortative mating between the different Guadeloupean anole populations does not exist, despite their distinct differences in appearance and them having separated about 650,000 years ago (confidence interval starting at 351,000 years). Hybridization between different anole species has rarely been documented.

In contrast to this, anoles can change rapidly in response to changes, which is an example of microevolution. They are one of the few known examples of "visible evolution" (i.e., where changes happen at a speed where they can be observed within a human lifetime), together with groups like stickleback fish, guppies and Peromyscus beach mice. In studies of brown anoles introduced to Florida it has been seen that they can become longer-legged in a single generation when living with the predatory, ground-living northern curly-tailed lizard (shorter-legged anoles are slower and easier to catch for the curly-tailed lizard). Over a longer period, however, their legs become shorter, which are better suited for perching on smaller branches higher off the ground, out of reach for the curly-tailed lizard. When brown anoles are introduced to small islands with low vegetation, their legs become shorter, better suited for rapidly moving among the shrunken shrubbery to catch insects and avoid predatory birds. Furthermore, in a study where brown anoles were introduced to seven small, anole-free Bahaman islands (anoles had disappeared because of Hurricane Frances), it was seen that—although all populations became shorter-legged within a few years—this was proportional to the leg-size of the founders. In other words: The few founder brown anoles introduced to one island were shorter-legged than the few introduced to another. Both populations became shorter-legged over time, but the first remained shorter-legged than the second. This is an example of the founder effect. Similarly, when brown anoles were introduced to Florida, the native Carolina (or green) anoles moved to higher perches and gained larger toe pads better suited for those perches. This adaptation occurred in just 20 generations. Anoles are also adapting to life with humans: Puerto Rican crested anoles living in cities have developed more adhesive lamellae on their toe pads than ones living in forests, reflecting the need for being able to climb very smooth surfaces like windows in the former habitat. In contrast to these fast changes, anole's adaptability to temperature changes has traditionally been considered relatively minor. Nevertheless, when Puerto Rican crested anoles in Florida (where introduced in the 1970s) were compared to the original, native population in Puerto Rico, it was discovered that the former had become adapted to colder temperatures, by about 3 °C (5.4 °F). An even faster adaption was observed in Carolina anoles from Texas during the unusually cold winter of 2013–2014. Carolina anoles living in central Texas and further north were already adapted to relatively cold temperatures, but those of southern Texas were not. However, after the winter of 2013–2014, the cold tolerance of the southern Texan populations had increased by as much as 1.5 °C (2.7 °F) and their genomic profiles had changed to more closely resemble the more northerly living Carolina anoles.

=== Taxonomy ===
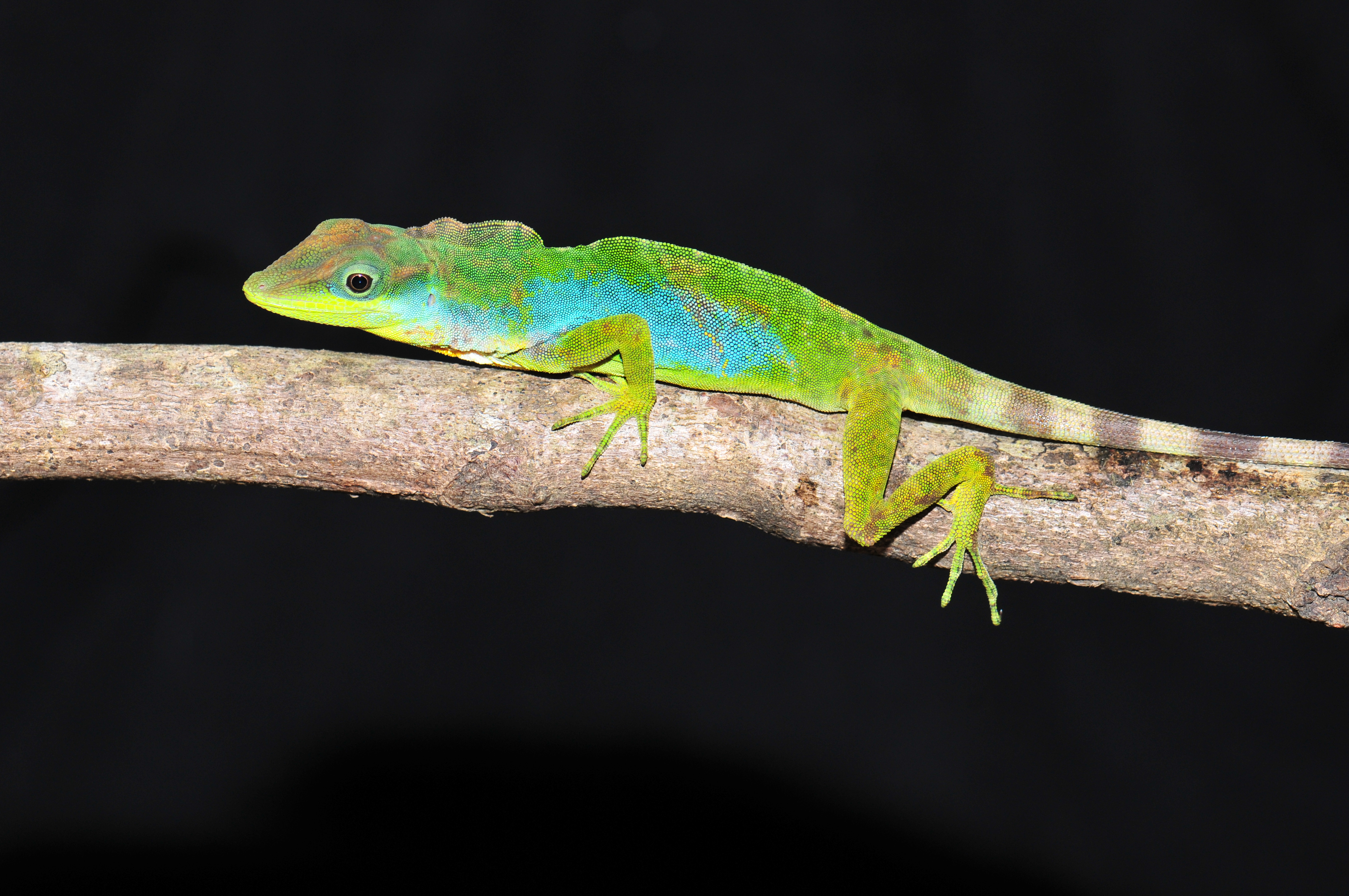
New anole species are regularly described, like Anolis (Dactyloa) kunayalae from Panama in 2007

The name for this group of lizards originates from the Carib anoli. It was modified and used in French Creole, and then transferred to English via the genus name Anolis, coined by French zoologist François Marie Daudin in 1802.

Several family names have been used for the anoles in recent decades. Initially they were placed in Iguanidae. This family, then comprising several very different groups, was split into eight families in 1989, with anoles being part of Polychrotidae together with Polychrus (bush anoles). However, genetic studies have shown that Polychrus is closer to Hoplocercidae than the true anoles. The true anoles are closer to Corytophanidae (basilisks and relatives). The true anoles have therefore been transferred to their own family Dactyloidae, alternatively listed as subfamily Dactyloinae of family Iguanidae. The name Anolidae (Cope, 1864) has sometimes been used, but it is a junior synonym of Dactyloidae (Fitzinger, 1843).

More than 425 species of true anoles are known. New species are regularly described, including 12 in 2016 alone. Most of the recent discoveries have been from the mainland of the Americas, with fewer new anoles described from the comparatively better-known Caribbean Islands.

==== Genera ====
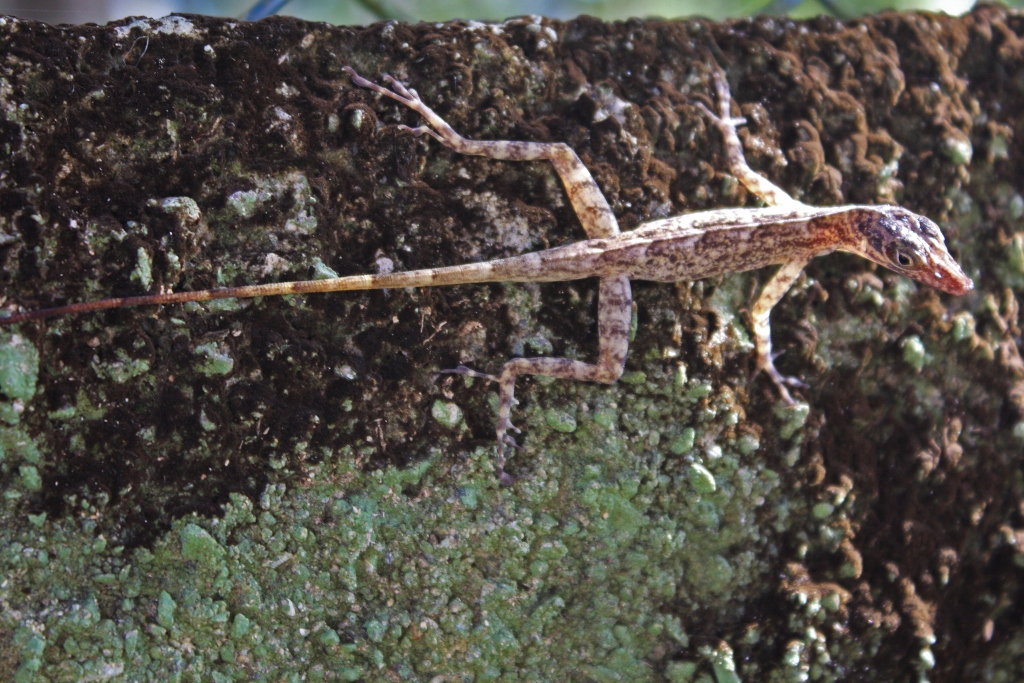
The phylogenetic position of the Guantanamo (shown) and cave anoles is not entirely clear. They are tentatively included as the lucius group in Anolis, but might warrant separation as genus Gekkoanolis

Traditionally, all the true anoles were included in the genus Anolis and some continue to use this treatment, in which case it is the largest genus of reptile. An attempt of dividing this huge genus was already made in 1959–1960, when they were placed in two major groups, the so-called "alpha anoles" (comprising most anole subgroups) and "beta anoles" (equalling today's Norops). In the following decades other changes were recommended. This included a proposal to recognize four genera, Anolis, Chamaeleolis, Chamaelinorops and Phenacosaurus, in 1976. In 1986, it was proposed that eight should be recognized: the four from 1976, and Ctenonotus, Dactyloa, Norops and Semiurus (the last was later replaced by its senior synonym Xiphosurus). These changes were adopted by some and rejected by others, who continued placing all in Anolis. In 1998–1999, the first comprehensive molecular studies of the anoles were published, confirming the earlier suspicion that the so-called "beta anoles" are a monophyletic group, but the "alpha anoles" are not. Furthermore, the genus splits proposed in 1976 and 1986 caused problems, as the narrowly defined Anolis was not monophyletic. In 2004, a major review based on several types of data (both molecular and morphological) revealed several groups and partially confirmed the genetic results from 1998 to 1999. No major changes were proposed and all anoles were maintained in a broadly defined Anolis. Two recent studies, primarily genetic and published in 2012 and 2017, confirmed several of the groups found in earlier studies, but rejected others. They found that the anoles fall into eight primary clades. Some of these can be further subdivided: For example, Chamaeleolis (from Cuba) is one of two subclades within Xiphosurus and it is sometimes considered a valid genus (in which case Xiphosurus is restricted to Hispaniola, Puerto Rico and nearby smaller islands). In contrast, the earlier proposed genus Phenacosaurus (from the Andes and tepui highlands in northwestern South America) is now included in Dactyloa. The phylogenetic position of most species is clear, but in a few the available evidence is conflicting and/or labelled with considerable statistic uncertainty.

The relationship of Dactyloidae can be described with a cladogram. Whether the eight groups are best recognized as separate genera or only as clades within a single genus, Anolis, is disputed. A few families between Polychrotidae and Corytophanidae+Dactyloidae are not shown:

- - Polychrotidae (bush anoles)
  - - Corytophanidae (basilisks and relatives)
    - Dactyloidae (anoles)
      - Dactyloa
      - - Deiroptyx
        - - Audantia
          - - Chamaelinorops
            - - Xiphosurus
              - - Anolis ("Ctenocercus")
                - - Ctenonotus
                  - - Norops

The eight proposed genera in Dactyloidae
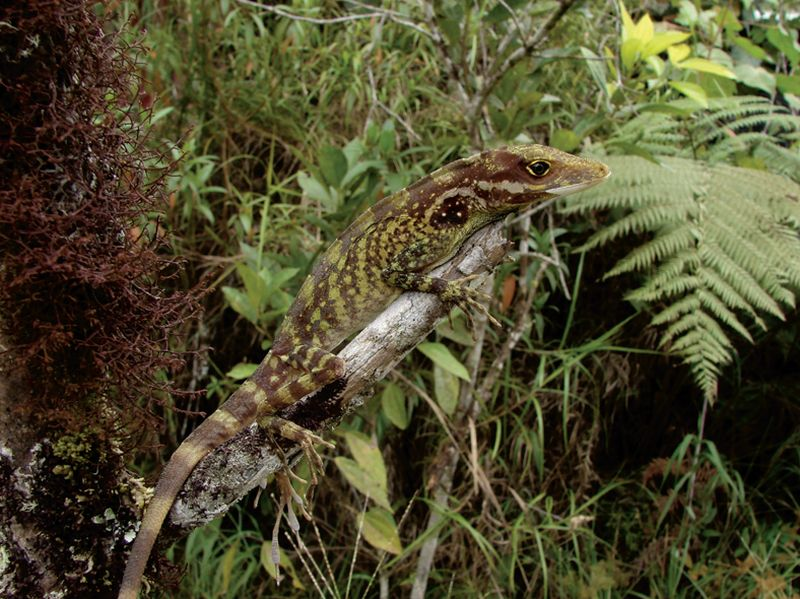
Dactyloa:
About 95 species from southern Central America, South America and southern Lesser Antilles (shown: Dactyloa podocarpus)

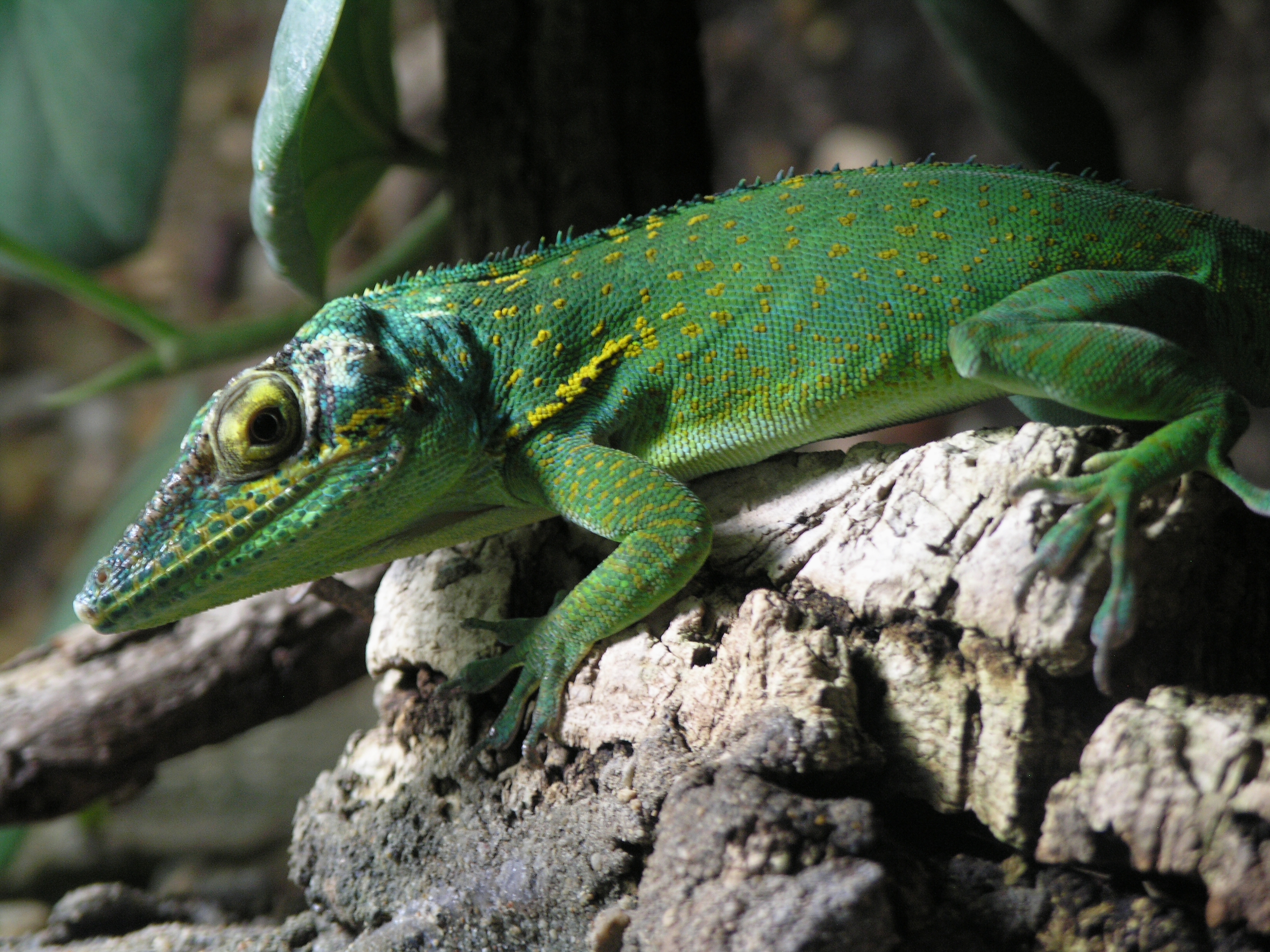
Deiroptyx:
Almost 35 species from Cuba, Hispaniola and Puerto Rico (shown: Deiroptyx baracoae)

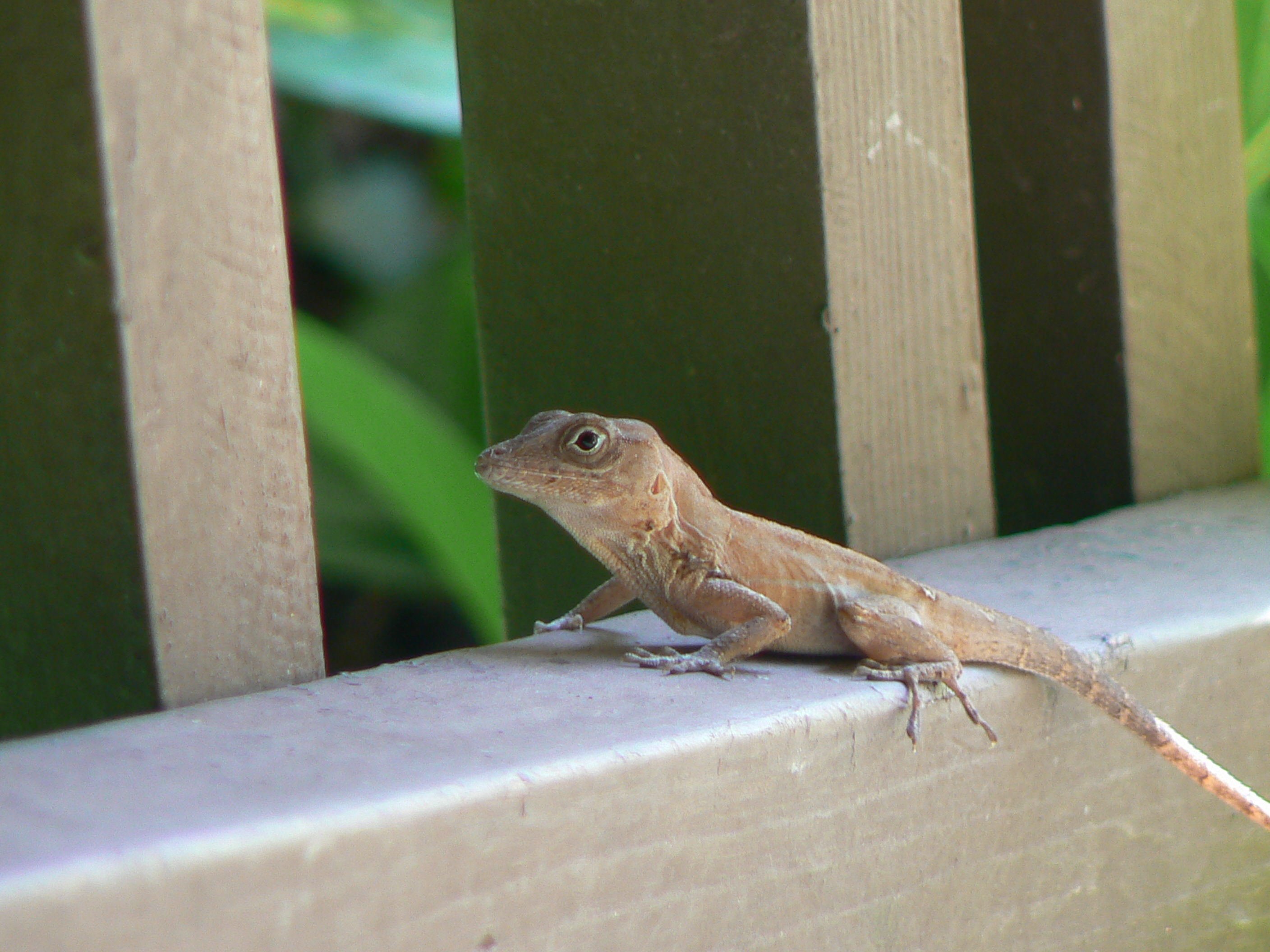
Audantia:
About 10 species from Hispaniola and surrounding small islands (shown: Audantia cyboter)

Chamaelinorops:
7 species from Hispaniola and surrounding small islands (example: Chamaelinorops barbouri)

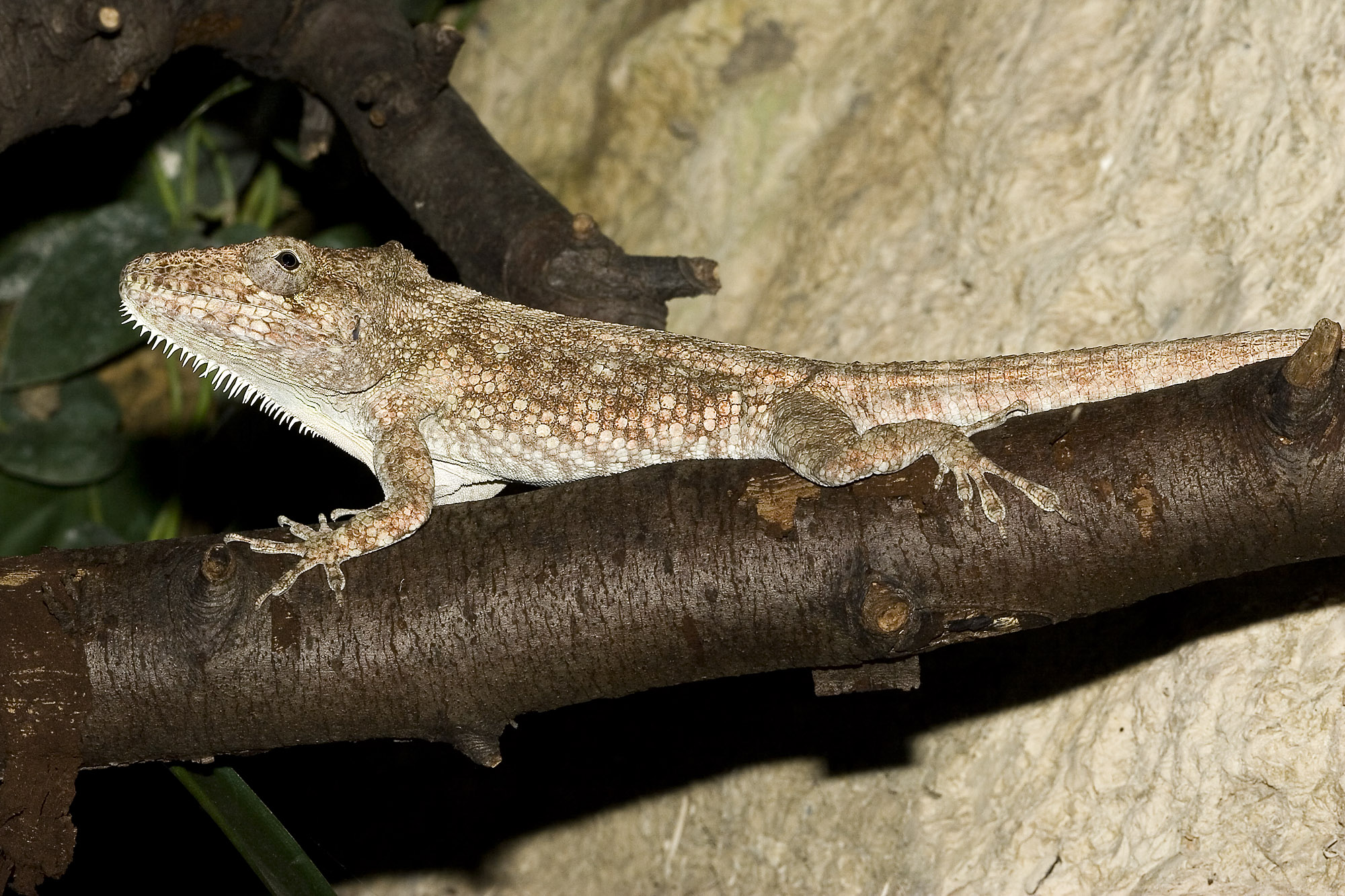
Xiphosurus:
About 15 species from Cuba, Hispaniola and Puerto Rico (shown: Xiphosurus barbatus)

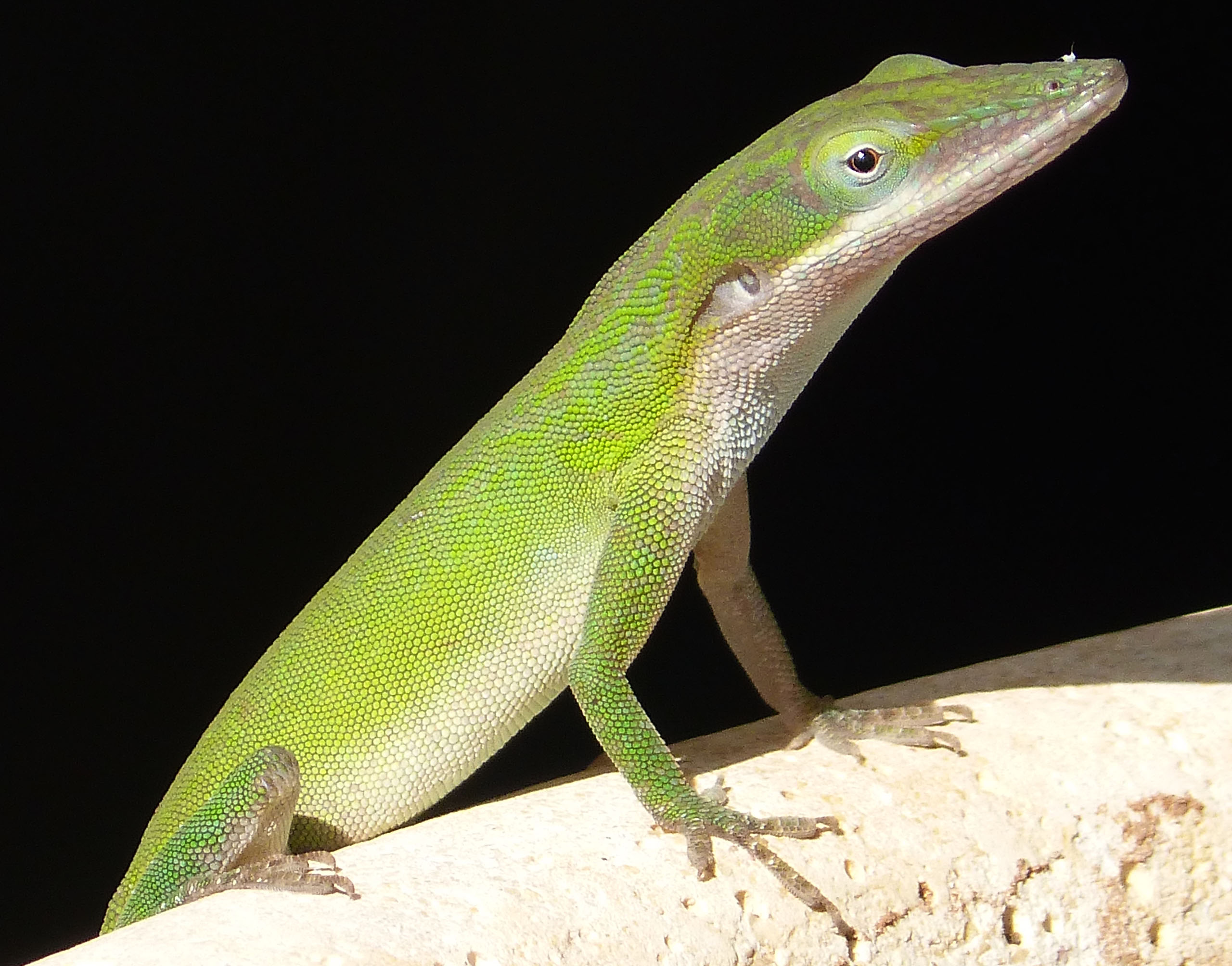
Anolis:
About 45 species from Cuba, Hispaniola, Bahamas, Little Cayman and southeastern United States (shown: Anolis porcatus)

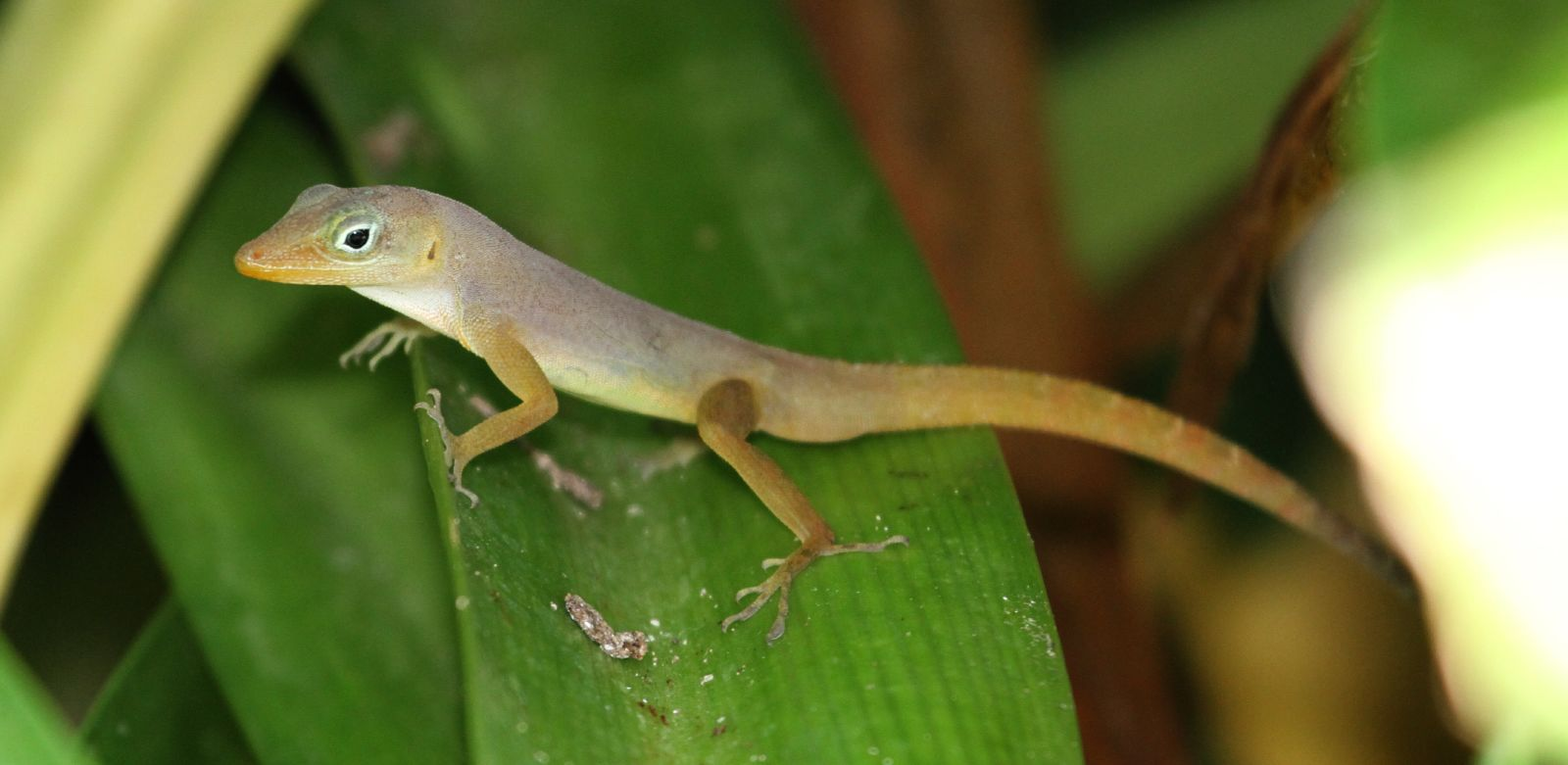
Ctenonotus:
More than 40 species from Bahamas, Turks and Caicos, Hispaniola, Puerto Rico and northern Lesser Antilles (shown: Ctenonotus schwartzi)

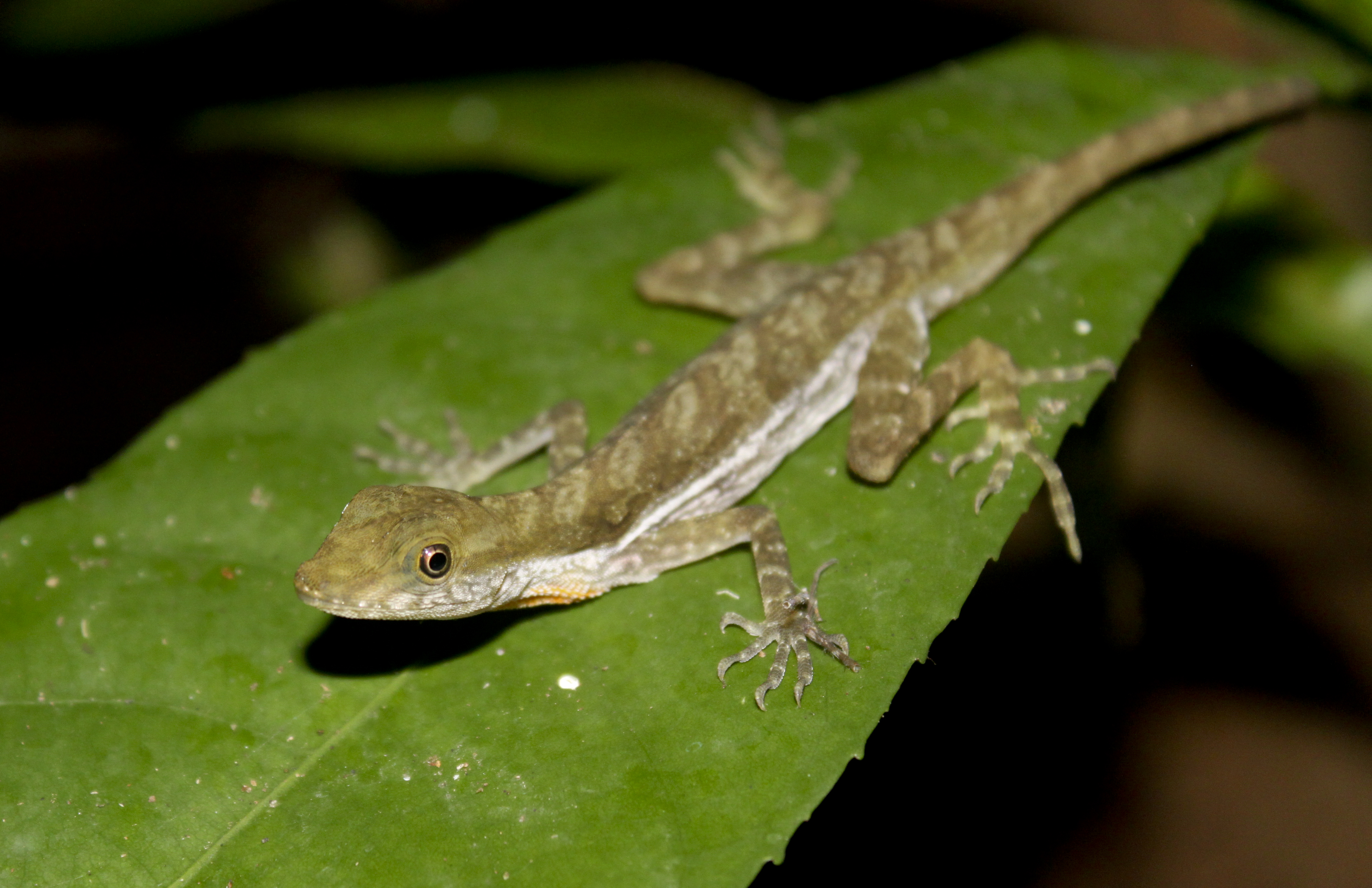
Norops:
About 190 species from Mexico, Central and South America, Cuba, Jamaica, Cayman and Bahamas (shown: Norops poecilopus)

== Relationship with humans ==
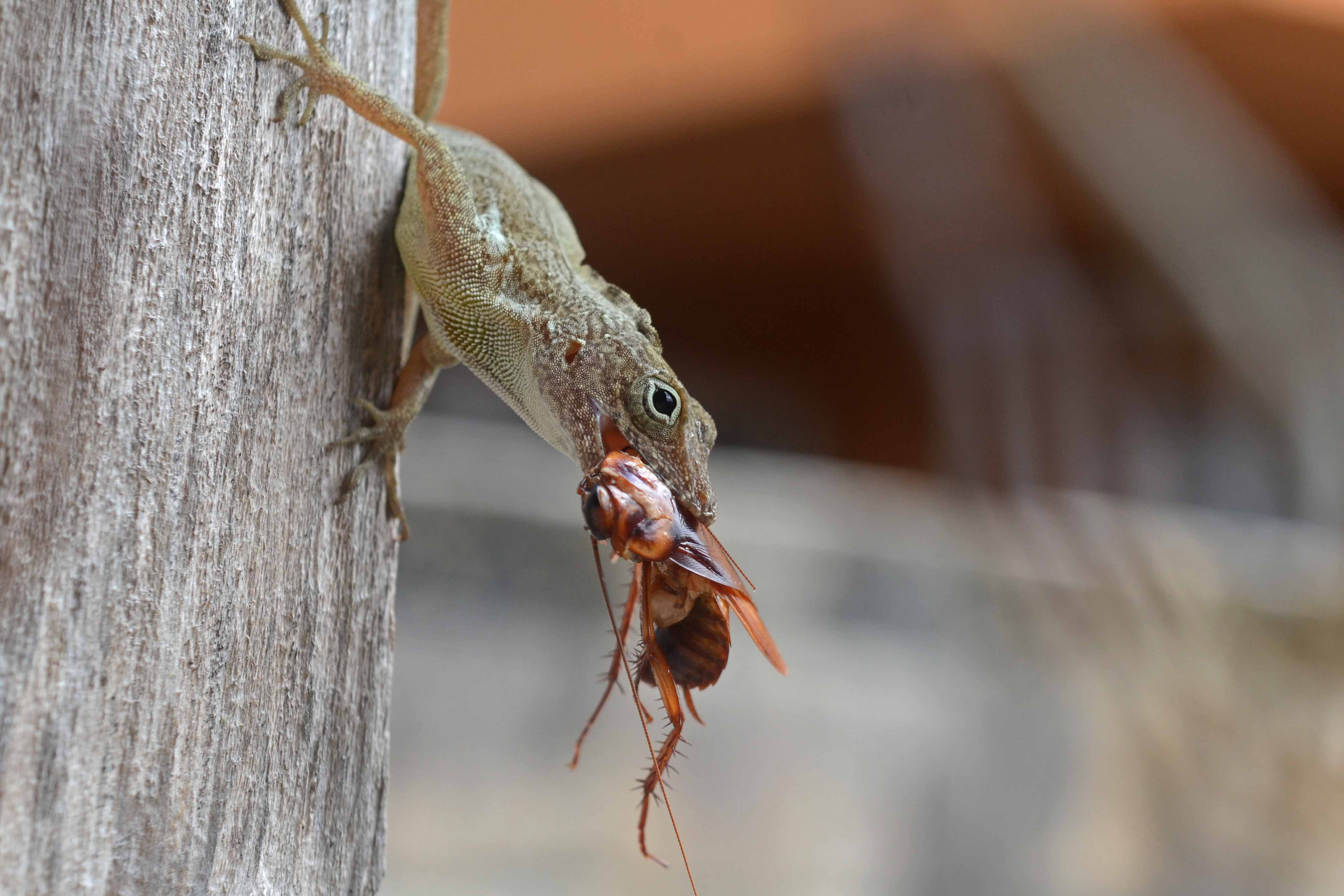
Anoles will eat pest insects, like this crested anole with a cockroach

Anoles are model organisms often studied in fields such as ecology, behavior, physiology and evolution. The Carolina (or green) anole is the most-studied anole species, with the earliest dedicated studies being more than 100 years old, from the late 1800s. The Carolina anole was the first reptile where the entire genome was sequenced.

Anoles are harmless to humans, but if caught or cornered they will bite in self-defense. As typical of animals, the bite force is strongly correlated to the size of the anole. It causes little pain in the smaller anoles which usually do not break the skin. Large species have relatively strong jaws lined with small, sharp teeth, and their bite can be painful and result in a superficial wound, but it is still essentially harmless.

Some anole species are commonly kept in captivity as pets and especially the Carolina (or green) anole is often described as a good "beginner's reptile", but it too requires specialized care.

Anoles can function as a biological pest control by eating pest insects that may harm humans or plants. Anole abundances can be considerably higher in diversified agroecosystems (multiple different plant types) than high-intensity agroecosystems (typically only one or very few plant types, and regular use of agrochemicals), making the former particularly suitable for this type of pest control. However, because of their potential of becoming invasive species, releasing anoles outside their native range is strongly discouraged and often illegal, even if the species occurs elsewhere in a country (for example, it is illegal to release Carolina anoles in California, as its native range is in the Southeastern United States).

=== Conservation ===
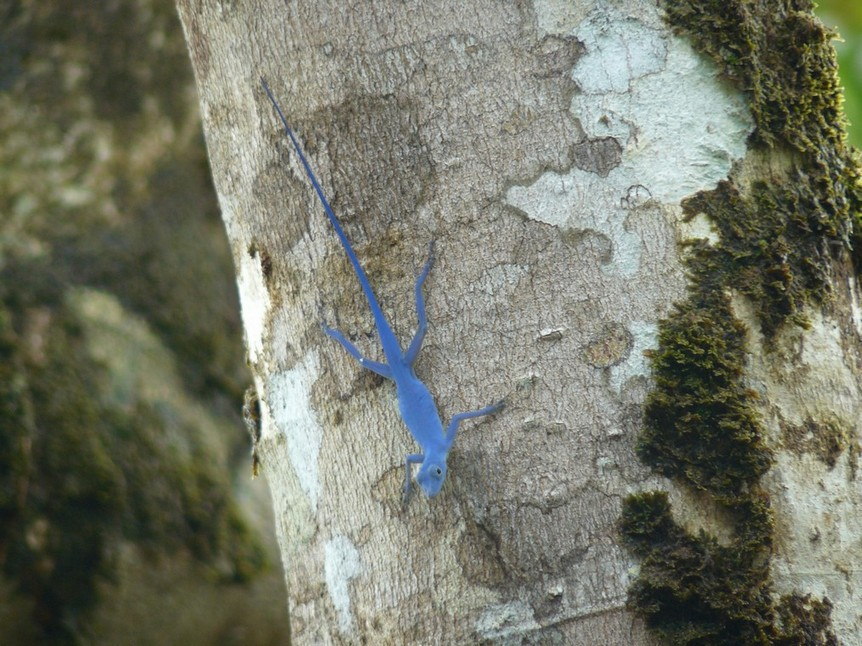
The blue anole is threatened by introduced predators

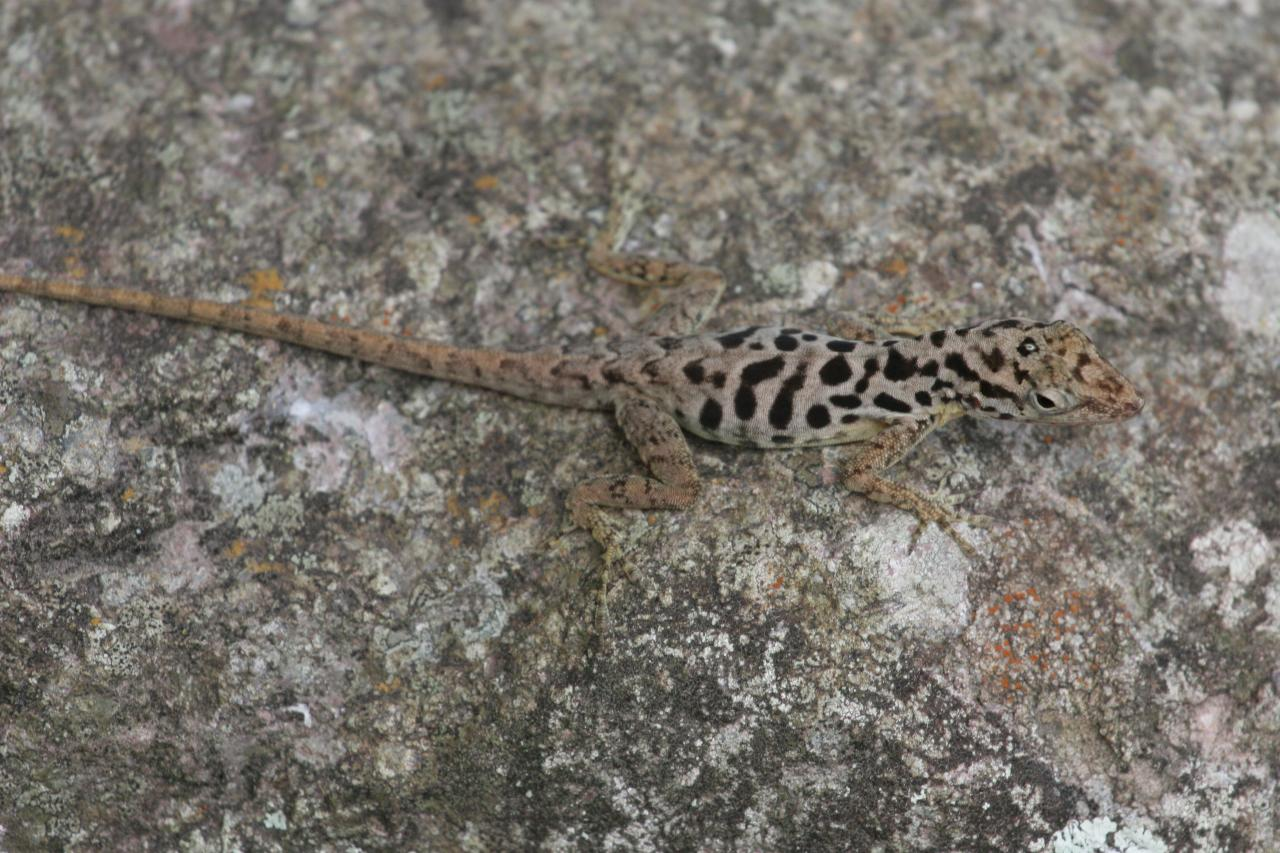
The Saban anole is restricted to the 13 km^{2} (5 mi^{2}) Saba Island where it is common, but its tiny range makes it vulnerable

The willingness of many anoles of living close to humans in heavily altered habitats have made them common. Some anoles can occur in very high densities, as illustrated by the Saint Vincent bush, Puerto Rican bush and spotted anoles where it has been estimated that there locally are almost 28,000 individuals per hectare (11,500 per acre) in the first species and at least 20,000–21,000 per hectare (8,000–8,500 per acre) in the last two. However, in most species the density is lower and in rare anoles it can be well below 100 individuals per hectare (40 per acre). Some are restricted to specific habitats such as primary rainforest, making them more vulnerable. In a review in 2017, it was found that more than 50 anole species had a known total range that covered 100 km^{2} (40 mi^{2}) or less around their type locality. As of April 2018, only 90 anoles, equalling less than one-quarter of the total number of recognized species, had been rated by the IUCN. Most of these are either least concern (not threatened) or data deficient (limited available data prevents an assessment), but 20 are considered vulnerable, 48 endangered and 22 critically endangered. Typical threats to these are habitat loss from both humans and extreme weather, or competition/predation by introduced species. For example, the Finca Ceres anole, a critically endangered species only known from a single unprotected location in Matanzas Province, Cuba, has suffered habitat loss both due to hurricanes and expanding agricultural land. A. amplisquamosus, a critically endangered species only known from highland forest in the Cusuco National Park region of Honduras, was common in the early 2000s, but by 2006 it had experienced a drastic decline and was only infrequently encountered. A clear explanation for this is lacking, although it may be related to habitat loss due to human development and agriculture. Similarly, A. landestoyi, which only was described in 2016 and has not been rated by the IUCN, is restricted to the Loma Charco Azul reserve in Hispaniola, but it is seriously threatened by continuing illegal habitat destruction by slash-and-burn agriculture, livestock grazing and production of wood charcoal. Certain highly localized species can be threatened by other anoles. The Cook's anole, found only in southwestern Puerto Rico and considered endangered by the Puerto Rico Department of Natural and Environmental Resources, faces habitat loss and fragmentation from human development, predation by introduced species (especially cats and rats) and direct competition from a more widespread native, the Puerto Rican crested anole. The Puerto Rican crested anole has also been introduced to Dominica where it locally is outcompeting the endemic Dominican anole, having already largely displaced the South Caribbean ecotype (traditionally subspecies Anolis o. oculatus), which possibly may require a captive breeding program to ensure its survival.

Nevertheless, anoles overall do not appear to have experienced the widespread extinctions and extirpations prevalent among larger Caribbean reptiles. The Culebra Island giant anole is the only anole considered possibly extinct in recent history (other extinct anoles are prehistoric and only known from fossil remains that are millions of years old). Locals reported sighting of the Culebra Island giant anole as recent as the 1980s, but this likely involved misidentifications of young green iguanas. Others, at least the Morne Constant anole, do not grow as large today as they once did.

Species restricted to a specific habitat in relatively remote regions, infrequently visited by biologists looking for reptiles, are often virtually unknown and rarely recorded. In a review in 2017, it was found that 15 anole species only were known from their holotype. These may truly be rare and seriously threatened, as the proboscis anole, a species that only was known from a single specimen collected in 1953 until it was rediscovered in cloud forests of Ecuador in 2004. In others with few records, like the Neblina anole, this is not the case. It was initially known from six 1980s specimens from the remote Neblina highlands in Venezuela, but when the Brazilian part of these highlands were visited in 2017 it was discovered that the species was locally abundant. Some species are easily overlooked, even if common. For example, if searching for Orces' Andes anole during the night when asleep they can be fairly easy to find, but if visiting the same location during the day it can be very difficult to find any.

=== As introduced species ===
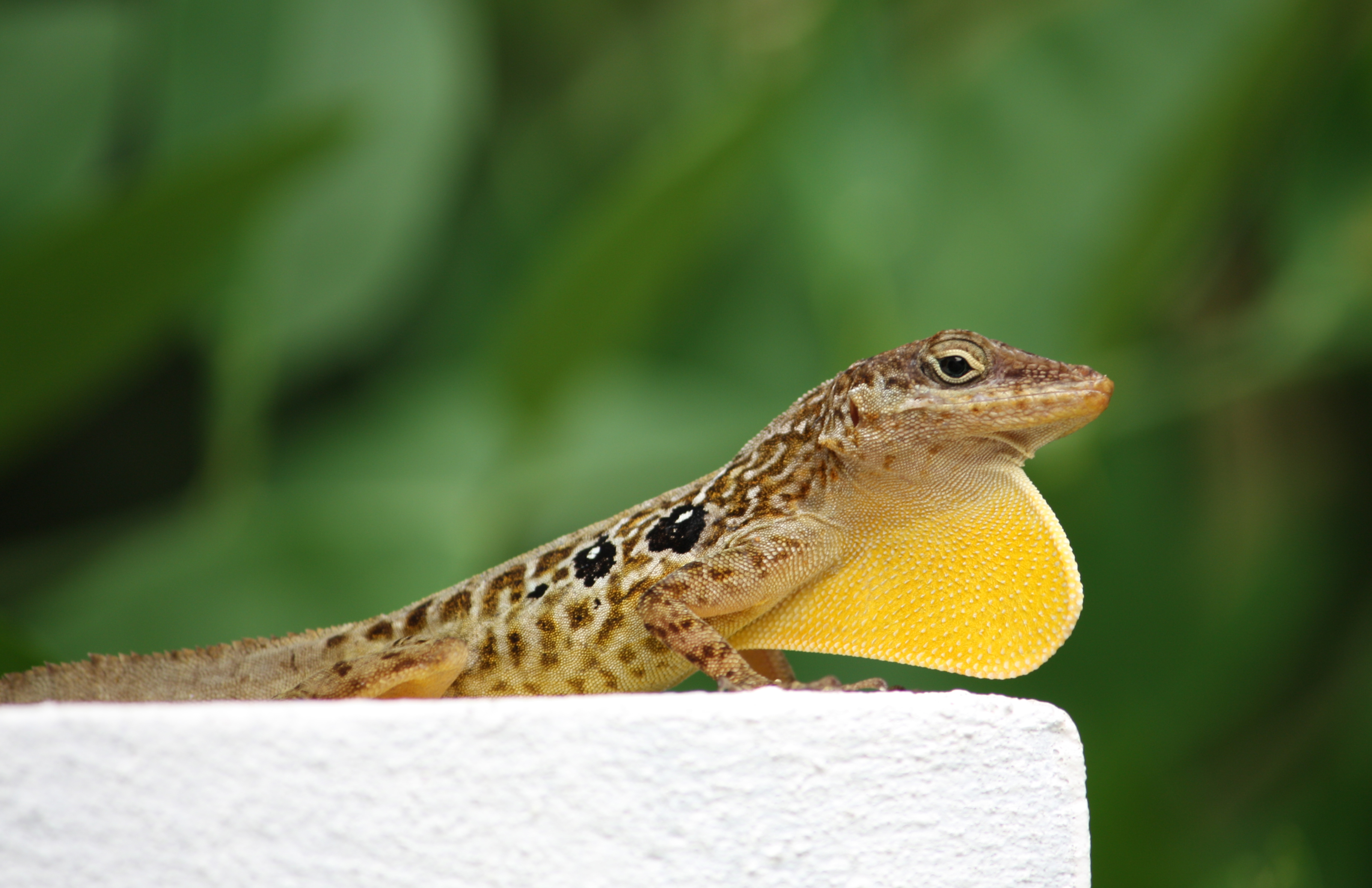
The Dominican anole (shown) is threatened by the introduced Puerto Rican crested anole

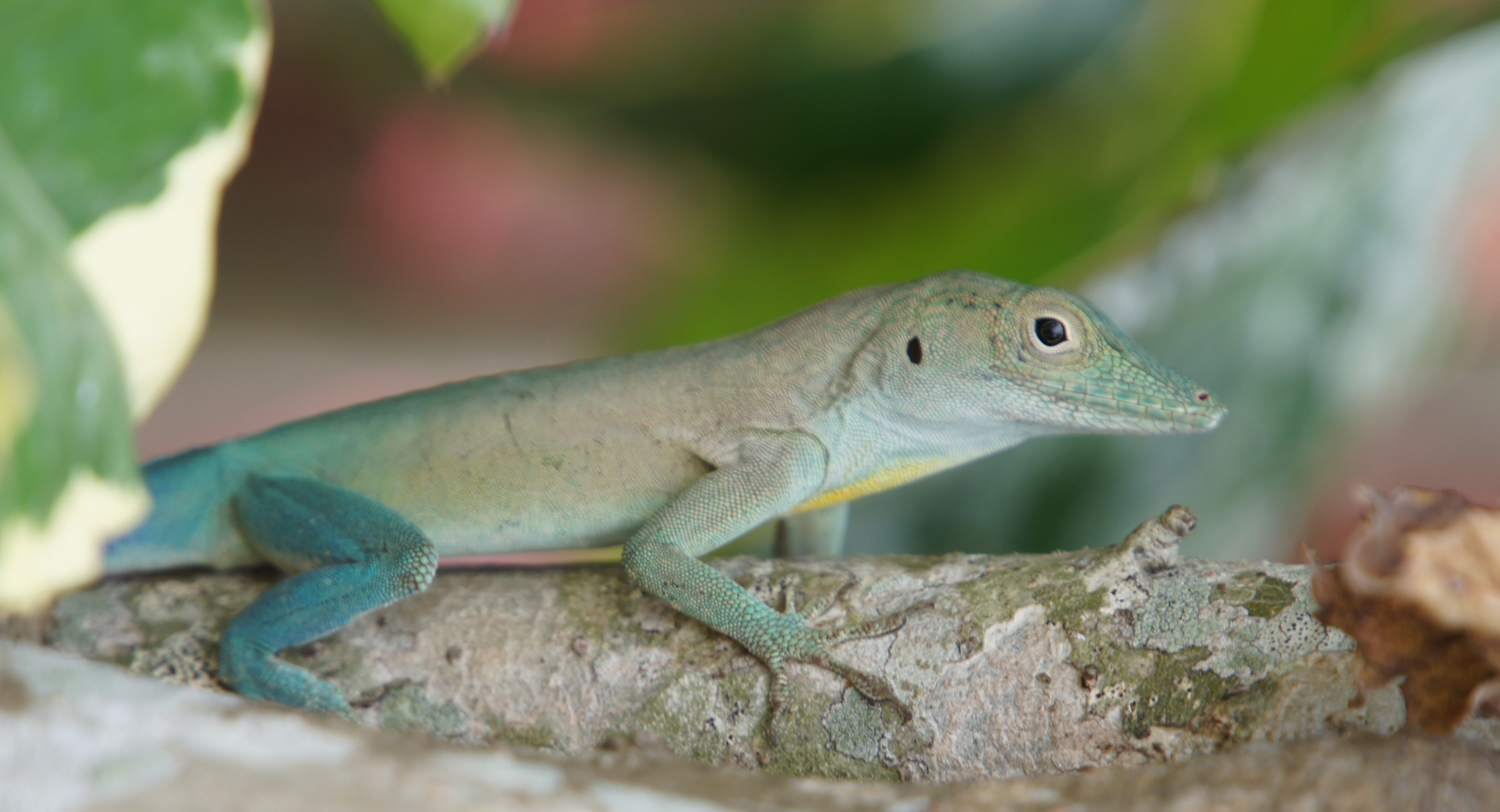
The Graham's anole (shown) and brown anole have been introduced to Bermuda where they threaten the rare Bermuda rock lizard

When introduced to regions outside their native range by humans, anoles may become invasive and represent a serious threat to small local animals. Such introductions may happen by mistake (for example, as "stowaways" on garden plants) or deliberately (as predators introduced to combat insects or release of pet anoles people no longer want).

In the contiguous United States, the Carolina anole has been introduced to California, the brown anole has been introduced to the Gulf Coast states and California, and the knight, Jamaican giant, bark, large-headed, Puerto Rican crested, Cuban green and Hispaniolan green anoles have been introduced to Florida. The Barbados and Morne Constant anoles have also been recorded in Florida, but do not appear to have become established. There are indications that the invasive brown anole is displacing the native Carolina anole in Florida and Texas by outcompeting it and eating its young. In the most disturbed habitats the Carolina anole may disappear entirely, but in less disturbed habitats where there is more cover (allowing young to avoid predation) it may remain fairly common, although it is forced to occur higher in trees where less visible to humans. Regardless, the Carolina anole is common and widespread overall, and it has itself been introduced to several regions outside its native range, including California, Kansas, Hawaii, Guam, Palau, the Bahamas, Cayman Islands, Anguilla, Belize, Tamaulipas in Mexico, and Japan's Okinawa and Ogasawara (Bonin) Islands. Although there are several records from Spain (both the mainland and the Canary Islands), none of these have become established. In Japan's Ogasawara Islands, the introduced Carolina anoles have caused declines in native lizards and diurnal insects, including the near-extinction of five endemic dragonfly species and the likely extinction of the Celastrina ogasawaraensis butterfly. This may be due to the ecological naïveté of the insects (before the introduction, there were no diurnal, highly arboreal lizards) and a very high anole density on these Japanese islands, as similar insect declines have not been reported from the Bahamas (which already had diurnal, arboreal lizards), or Guam, Saipan and Hawaii (where the anole density is lower). In addition to Florida, the Cuban green anole has been introduced to the Dominican Republic, São Paulo (Brazil) and Tenerife (Spain). In Florida and the Dominican Republic it competes with native anoles (Carolina anole and Hispaniolan green anole, respectively) and it is feared that something similar may happen in São Paulo. The same pattern can be seen in Dominica where the introduced Puerto Rican crested anole locally has displaced the endemic Dominican anole. The brown anole and Graham's anole have both been introduced to Bermuda where they threaten the very rare Bermuda rock lizard. This problem has not been reported for the Leach's and Barbados anoles, the other species introduced to Bermuda. In the Cayman Islands the endemic Cayman blue-throated anole has moved to higher perched in places where the introduced brown anole is present (similar to the Carolina anole in places where brown anoles are present). Outside the Americas, the brown anole has been introduced to Hawaii, Tenerife, Singapore and Taiwan, and it is able to change ant communities on the last of these islands.
