= List of amphibians and reptiles of Cuba =

This is a list of amphibians and reptiles in the archipelago of Cuba. It includes 27 reptiles and 55 amphibians that are critically endangered. Many of these animals are threatened by loss of habitat and hunting.

This list includes both native and introduced (I) species.

== Reptilia ==
=== Turtles ===
The island is home to one terrestrial turtle, while marine species often come and go on the beaches.

- Cuban slider, Trachemys decussata
- Green sea turtle, Chelonia mydas
- Hawksbill sea turtle, Eretmochelys imbricata
- Loggerhead sea turtle, Caretta caretta
- Leatherback turtle, Dermochelys coriacea
- Olive ridley sea turtle, Lepidochelys olivacea

=== Crocodilians ===
The Cuban crocodile is found in the Zapata Swamp region and the Isla de la Juventud. The spectacled caiman is not native to the island and was introduced by pet traders.

==== Crocodiles ====
- Cuban crocodile, Crocodylus rhombifer
- American crocodile, Crocodylus acutus

==== Caiman ====
- Spectacled caiman, Caiman crocodilus (I)

=== Snakes ===
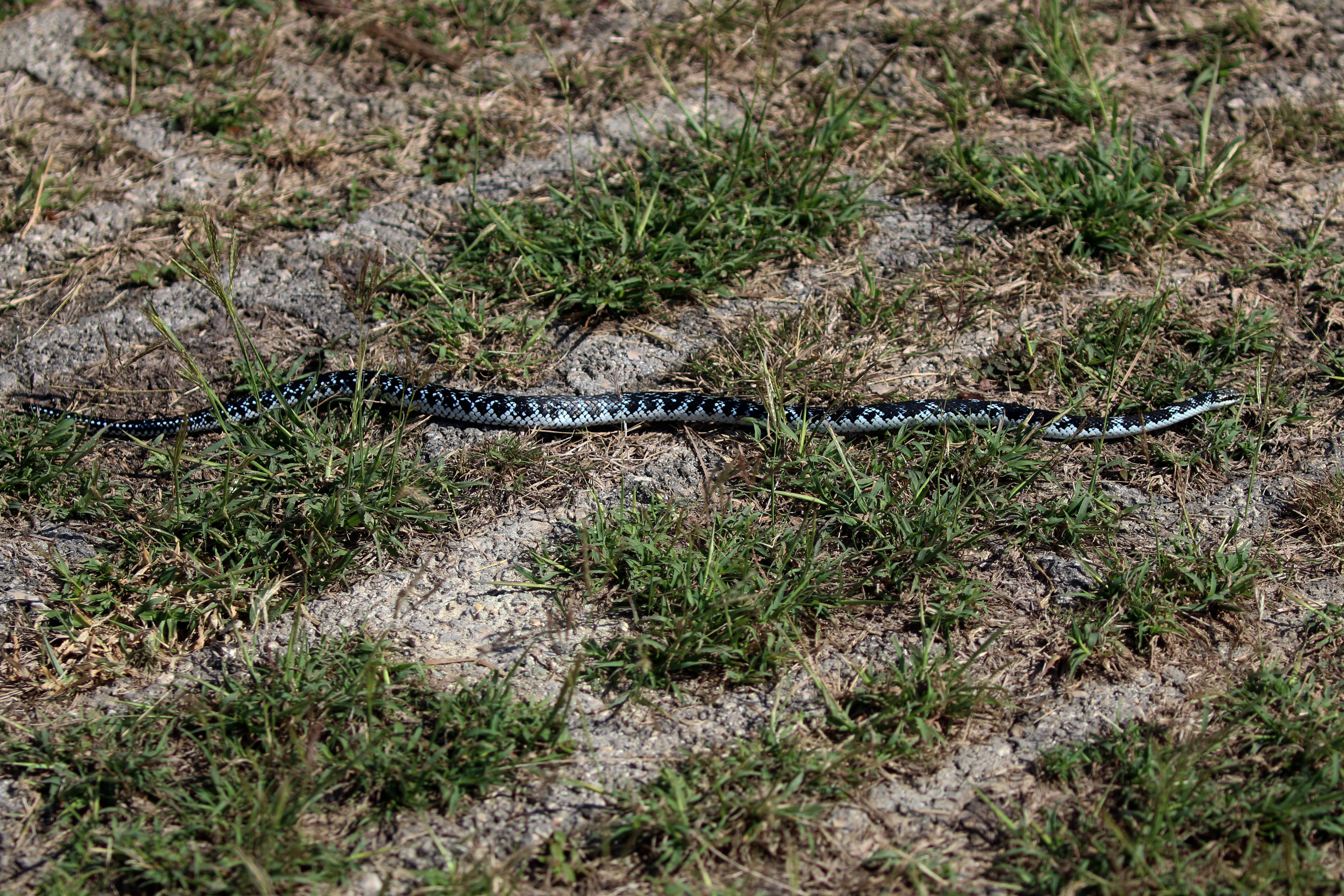
Cuban lesser racer Caraiba andreae morenoi Cayo Coco

- Cuban boa, Chilabothrus angulifer
- Las Tunas racerlet, Arrhyton ainictum
- Havana racerlet, Arrhyton dolichura
- Zapata long-tailed racerlet, Arrhyton procerum
- Oriente brown-capped racerlet, Arrhyton redimitum
- Oriente black racerlet, Arrhyton supernum
- Broad-striped racerlet, Arrhyton taeniatum
- Guaniguanico racerlet, Arrhyton tanyplectum
- Cuban short-tailed racerlet, Arrhyton vittatum
- Cuban lesser racer, Caraiba andreae
- Cuban racer, Cubophis cantherigerus
- Caribbean water snake, Tretanorhinus variabilis
- Salt marsh snake, Nerodia clarkii
- Canasi trope, Tropidophis celiae
- Broad-banded trope, Tropidophis feicki
- Cuban dusky trope, Tropidophis fuscus
- Escambray white-necked trope, Tropidophis galacelidus
- Escambray small-headed trope, Tropidophis hardyi
- Cuban khaki trope, Tropidophis hendersoni
- Spotted red trope, Tropidophis maculatus
- Giant trope, Tropidophis melanurus
- Zebra trope, Tropidophis morenoi
- Dark-bellied trope, Tropidophis nigriventris
- Spotted brown trope, Tropidophis pardalis
- Oriente white-necked trope, Tropidophis pilsbryi
- Yellow-banded trope, Tropidophis semicinctus
- Sancti Spiritus trope, Tropidophis spiritus
- Gracile banded trope, Tropidophis wrighti
- Guanahacabibes trope, Tropidophis xanthogaster
- Maisi blindsnake, Typhlops anchaurus
- Cuban pallid blindsnake, Typhlops anousius
- Havana giant blindsnake, Typhlops arator
- Cuban short-nosed blindsnake, Typhlops contorhinus
- Pinar del Rio giant blindsnake, Typhlops golyathi
- Cuban brown blindsnake, Typhlops lumbricalis
- Imias blindsnake, Typhlops notorachius
- Guantanamo Bay blinddsnake, Typhlops perimychus
- Cienfuegos blindsnake, Typhlops satelles

=== Lizards ===
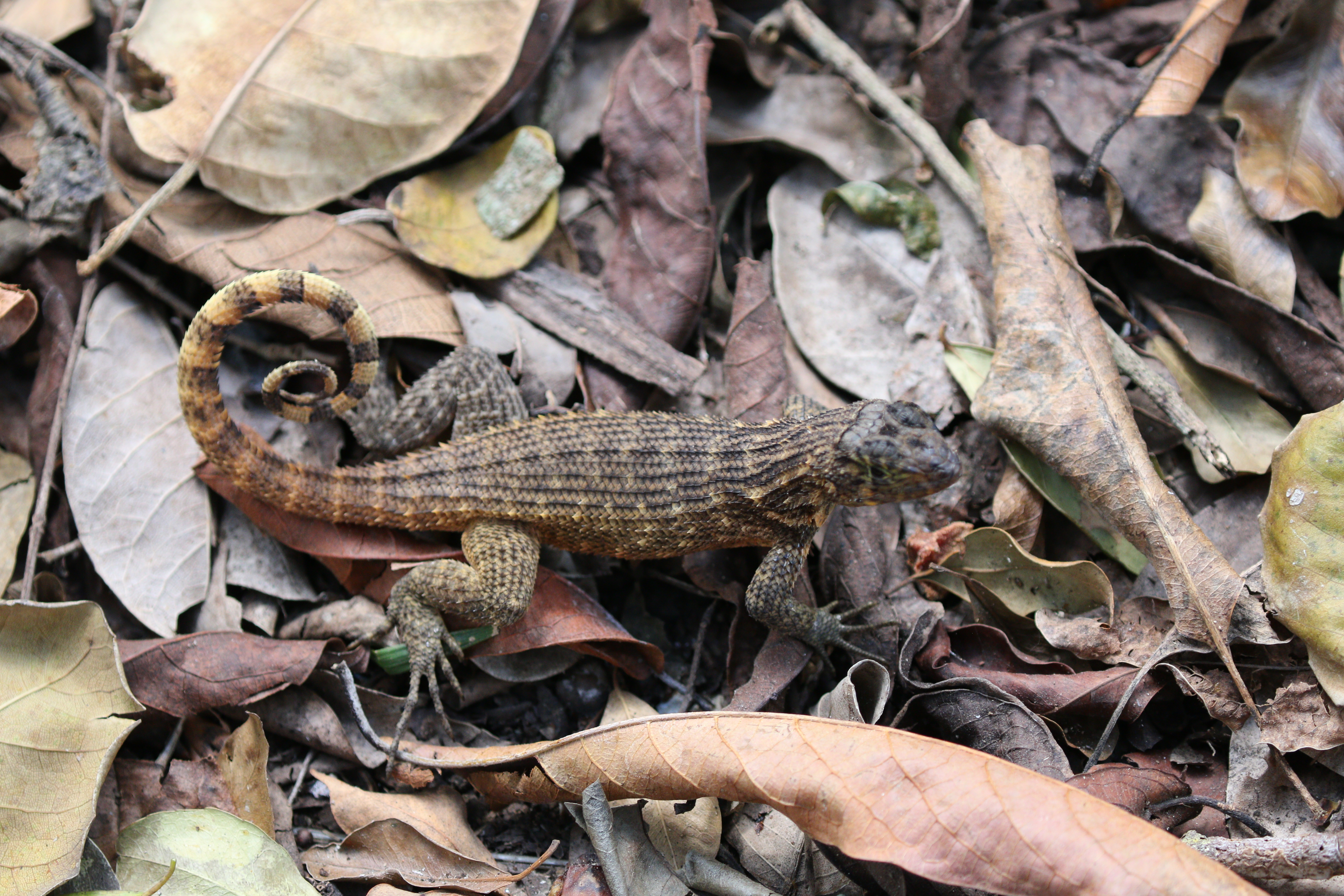
Cuban curly-tailed lizard Leiocephalus carinatus labrossytus Playa Larga

- Cuban pale-necked galliwasp, Diploglossus delasagra
- Cuban small-eared galliwasp, Diploglossus garridoi
- Cuban spotted galliwasp, Diploglossus nigropunctatus
- Ahl's anole, Anolis ahli
- Allison's anole, Anolis allisoni
- Anfiodlul anole, Anolis anfiloquioi
- Baracoa anole, Anolis baracoae
- Bay anole, Anolis argillaceus
- Black-cheeked bush anole, Anolis macilentus
- Blue-eyed grass-bush anole, Anolis alutaceus
- Branch anole, Anolis birama
- Bueycito anole, Anolis allogus
- Cabo Cruz banded anole, Anolis guafe
- Cabo Cruz bearded anole, Anolis agueroi
- Cabo Cruz pallid anole, Anolis ruibali
- Cabo Cruz trunk anole, Anolis confusus
- Cave anole, Anolis lucius
- Cayko Frances anole, Anolis pigmaequestris
- Central anole, Anolis centralis
- Cuban brown anole, Anolis sagrei
- Cuban green anole, Anolis porcatus
- Cuban spiny-plant anole, Anolis pumilus
- Cuban twig anole, Anolis angusticeps
- Cubitas anole, Anolis jubar
- Cupeyal anole, Anolis cupeyalensis
- Escambray bearded anole, Anolis guamuhaya
- Finca Ceres anole, Anolis juangundlachi
- Five-striped grass anole, Anolis ophiolepis
- Guamuhaya anole, Anolis delafuentei
- Garrido's anole, Anolis garridoi
- Gray-banded green anole, Anolis toldo
- Guantanamo anole, Anolis argenteolus
- Guantanamo twig anole, Anolis alayoni
- Habana anole, Anolis homolechis
- Herradura anole, Anolis bremeri
- Holguin anole, Anolis noblei
- Imias anole, Anolis imias
- Jatibonico anole, Anolis isolepis
- Knight anole, Anolis equestris
- Matanzas anole, Anolis spectrum
- Moa anole, Anolis fugitivus
- Mountain anole, Anolis clivicola
- Nueva Gerona anole, Anolis paternus
- Oriente bearded anole, Anolis porcus
- Oriente pallid anole, Anolis litoralis
- Peach anole, Anolis loysiana
- Peninsula anole, Anolis quadriocellifer
- Pimienta green anole, Anolis oporinus
- Pinardei Rio anole, Anolis mestrei
- Pineland bush anole, Anolis inexpectatus
- Purial bush anole, Anolis vescus
- Sagua de Tánamo anole, Anolis rubribarbus
- Santiago grass anole, Anolis rejectus
- Short-bearded anole, Anolis chamaeleonides
- Sierra anole, Anolis guazuma
- Small-fanned bush anole, Anolis alfaroi
- Smallwood's anole, Anolis smallwoodi
- Turquino emerald anole, Anolis incredulus
- Turquino green-mottled anole, Anolis altitudinalis
- Turquino white-fanned anole, Anolis turquinensis
- Vanidicus anole, Anolis vanidicus
- Vinales anole, Anolis vermiculatus
- West Cuban anole, Anolis bartschi
- Western bearded anole, Anolis barbatus
- Western giant anole, Anolis luteogularis
- Yateras anole, Anolis cyanopleurus
- Yellow-fanned pallid anole, Anolis terueli
- Cuban iguana, Cyclura nubila
- Cuban night lizard, Cricosaura typica
- Underwood's Spectacled Tegu, Gymnophthalmus underwoodi (I)
- Tropical house gecko, Hemidactylus mabouia (I)
- Mediterranean house gecko, Hemidactylus turcicus (I)
- American wall gecko, Tarentola americana
- Tuberculate gecko, Tarentola crombiei
- Reyes' Caribbean gecko, Aristelliger reyesi
- Ashy gecko, Sphaerodactylus elegans
- Baracoan eyespot sphaero, Sphaerodactylus celicara
- Black-spotted least gecko, Sphaerodactylus nigropunctatus
- Barbour's least gecko, Sphaerodactylus torrei
- Cabo Cruz banded sphaero, Sphaerodactylus docimus
- Camaguey least gecko, Sphaerodactylus scaber
- El Yunque least gecko, Sphaerodactylus bromeliarum
- Guantanamo collared sphaero, Sphaerodactylus schwartzi
- Guantanamo least gecko, Sphaerodactylus armasi
- Isle of Pines sphaero, Sphaerodactylus storeyae
- Juventud least gecko, Sphaerodactylus oliveri
- Mantanzas least gecko, Sphaerodactylus intermedius
- Ocellated gecko, Sphaerodactylus argus
- Pepper sphaero, Sphaerodactylus pimienta
- Ramsden's least gecko, Sphaerodactylus ramsdeni
- Reef gecko, Sphaerodactylus notatus
- Richard's banded sphaero, Sphaerodactylus richardi
- Ruibal's least gecko, Sphaerodactylus ruibali
- Santiago de Cuba sphaero, Sphaerodactylus dimorphicus
- Siboney gray-headed sphaero, Sphaerodactylus siboney
- Sierra Maestra three-banded sphaero, Sphaerodactylus ocujal
- Turquino collared sphaero, Sphaerodactylus cricoderus
- Yellow-headed gecko, Gonatodes albogularis
- Cabo Corrientes curlytail lizard, Leiocephalus stictigaster
- Cuban curlytail lizard, Leiocephalus cubensis
- Monte Verde curlytail lizard, Leiocephalus macropus
- Mountain curlytail lizard, Leiocephalus raviceps
- Northern curly-tailed lizard, Leiocephalus carinatus
- Sierra curlytail lizard, Leiocephalus onaneyi
- Auber's ameiva, Pholidoscelis auberi

=== Amphisbaenia ===
- Cuban many-ringed amphisbaena, Amphisbaena barbouri
- Cuban worm lizard, Amphisbaena cubana
- Cuban pink amphisbaena, Amphisbaena carlgansi
- Spotted amphisbaena, Cadea blanoides
- Sharp-nosed amphisbaena, Cadea palirostrata

== Amphibia ==
=== Frogs ===
- American bullfrog, Rana catesbeiana (I)
- Baracoa dwarf frog, Eleutherodactylus orientalis
- Barred rock frog, Eleutherodactylus klinikowskii
- Boca de Yumuri frog, Eleutherodactylus bartonsmithi
- Breasts-of-Julie frog, Eleutherodactylus tetajulia
- Cabo Cruz frog, Eleutherodactylus tonyi
- Camarones red-legged frog, Eleutherodactylus erythroproctus
- Canasi frog, Eleutherodactylus blairhedgesi
- Cuban bromeliad frog, Eleutherodactylus varians
- Cuban butterfly frog, Eleutherodactylus mariposa
- Cuban cave frog, Eleutherodactylus thomasi
- Cuban Colin frog, Eleutherodactylus eileenae
- Cuban giant frog, Eleutherodactylus zeus
- Cuban gray frog, Eleutherodactylus greyi
- Cuban groin-spot frog, Eleutherodactylus atkinsi
- Cuban khaki frog, Eleutherodactylus ronaldi
- Cuban long-legged frog, Eleutherodactylus dimidiatus
- Cuban pineland frog, Eleutherodactylus pinarensis
- Cuban red-rumped frog, Eleutherodactylus acmonis
- Cuban stream frog, Eleutherodactylus riparius
- Cuban telegraph frog, Eleutherodactylus auriculatus
- Cuban tree frog, Osteopilus septentrionalis
- Dark-faced bromeliad frog, Eleutherodactylus melacara
- Dwarf grass frog, Eleutherodactylus adelus
- Eastern Cuba grass frog, Eleutherodactylus feichtingeri
- Greenhouse frog, Eleutherodactylus planirostris
- Guanahacabibes frog, Eleutherodactylus guanahacabibes
- Guaniguanico yellow-mottled frog, Eleutherodactylus goini
- Guantanamera frog, Eleutherodactylus guantanamera
- Isla de la Juventud bromeliad frog, Eleutherodactylus staurometopon
- Miranda robber frog, Eleutherodactylus pezopetrus
- Maisi frog, Eleutherodactylus bresslerae
- Monte Iberia dwarf frog, Eleutherodactylus iberia
- Nipe frog, Eleutherodactylus pezopetrus
- Orange long-nosed frog, Eleutherodactylus jaumei
- Oriente coastal frog, Eleutherodactylus etheridgei
- Oriente greenish-yellow frog, Eleutherodactylus principalis
- Oriente mottled frog, Eleutherodactylus simulans
- Oriente pallid frog, Eleutherodactylus toa
- Oriente stream frog, Eleutherodactylus cuneatus
- Oriente tree frog, Eleutherodactylus ionthus
- Oriente yellow-bellied frog, Eleutherodactylus leberi
- Oriente yellow-mottled frog, Eleutherodactylus ricordii
- Pico Turquino robber frog, Eleutherodactylus intermedius
- Pinar del Rio bromeliad frog, Eleutherodactylus olibrus
- Rosario red-legged frog, Eleutherodactylus zugi
- Short-legged stream frog, Eleutherodactylus rivularis
- Sierra Maestra blotched frog, Eleutherodactylus michaelschmidi
- Sierra Maestra long-legged frog, Eleutherodactylus maestrensis
- Trinidad flathead frog, Eleutherodactylus casparii
- Trinidad groin-spot frog, Eleutherodactylus emiliae
- Turquino fern frog, Eleutherodactylus glamyrus
- Turquino red-armed frog, Eleutherodactylus cubanus
- Turquino spiny frog, Eleutherodactylus gundlachi
- Turquino stream frog, Eleutherodactylus turquinensis
- Turquino white-footed frog, Eleutherodactylus albipes
- Western Cuba grass frog, Eleutherodactylus varleyi
- Western spiny frog, Eleutherodactylus symingtoni
- Yellow-striped pygmy eleuth, Eleutherodactylus limbatus

=== Toads ===
- Western giant toad, Peltophryne fustiger
- Eastern giant toad, Peltophryne peltocephala
- Cuban high-crested toad, Peltophryne gundlachi
- Cuban small-eared toad, Peltophryne empusa
- Zapata toad, Peltophryne florentinoi
- Cuban long-nosed toad, Peltophryne longinasus
- Cuban pine toad, Peltophryne cataulaciceps
- Cuban spotted toad, Peltophryne taladai

== Sources ==
- Cuban Fauna: The Peculiar Sign of Crocodiles
- Endangered Amphibians of Central America
- Reptilia Species
- Amphibia Species
