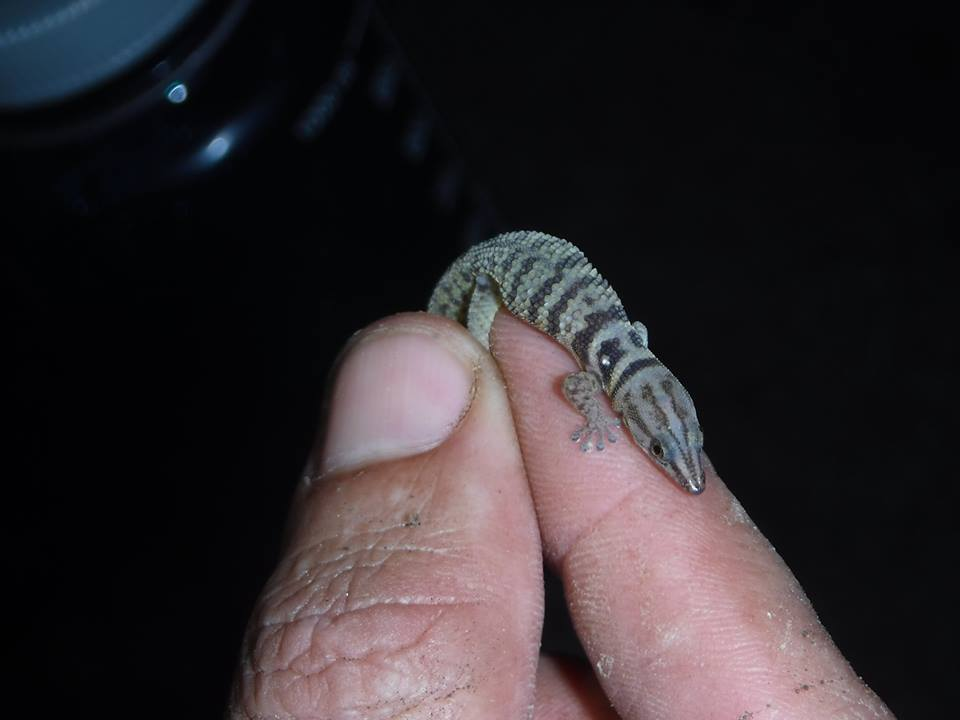

Conservation status
- Near Threatened (IUCN 3.1)

Scientific classification
- Kingdom: Animalia
- Phylum: Chordata
- Order: Squamata
- Suborder: Gekkota
- Family: Sphaerodactylidae
- Genus: Sphaerodactylus
- Species: S. richardi

Binomial name
- Sphaerodactylus richardi Hedges & Garrido, 1993

= Sphaerodactylus richardi =

Species of lizard

Sphaerodactylus richardi, also known commonly as Richard's banded sphaero or the Zapata big-scaled sphaero, is a small species of gecko, a lizard in the family Sphaerodactylidae. The species is endemic to Cuba.

== Etymology ==
The specific name, richardi, is in honor of American herpetologist Richard Thomas.

== Taxonomy ==
Sphaerodactylus richardi belongs to the scaber group. Other species in the group are S. oliveri, S. scaber, and S. storeyae.

== Description ==
Sphaerodactylus richardi may attain a snout-to-vent length (SVL) of 31.1 mm (1.22 in). It has large non-overlapping dorsal scales, except for a zone of mid-dorsal granular scales which is three scales wide. Adults have a dorsal color pattern of 5-6 bold dark crossbands on the body.

== Habitat ==
The preferred habitats of S. richardi are forest, shrubland, and marine intertidal.

== Reproduction ==
Sphaerodactylus richardi is oviparous.
