= Anolis garridoi =

Conservation status
- Endangered (IUCN 3.1)

Scientific classification
- Kingdom: Animalia
- Phylum: Chordata
- Order: Squamata
- Suborder: Iguania
- Family: Anolidae
- Genus: Anolis
- Species: A. garridoi

Binomial name
- Anolis garridoi Díaz, Estrada & Moreno, 1996

Species of lizard

Anolis garridoi, also known commonly as the Escambray twig anole, is a species of lizard in the family Dactyloidae. The species is endemic to Cuba.

== Etymology ==
The specific name, garridoi, is in honor of Cuban herpetologist Orlando H. Garrido.

== Geographic range ==
A. garridoi is found in Sancti Spíritus Province, Cuba.

== Habitat ==
The preferred natural habitat of A. garridoi is savanna, at altitudes of 700–800 m (2,300–2,600 ft).

== Diet ==
A. garridoi preys upon insects.

== Reproduction ==
A. garridoi is oviparous.

== Taxonomy ==
A. garridoi belongs to the Anolis angusticeps species group.
