= Arrhyton =

Scientific classification
- Kingdom: Animalia
- Phylum: Chordata
- Class: Reptilia
- Order: Squamata
- Suborder: Serpentes
- Family: Colubridae
- Subfamily: Dipsadinae
- Genus: Arrhyton; Günther, 1858

Species
- Nine recognized species, see article

Genus of snakes

Arrhyton is a genus of New World snakes, commonly known as island racers or racerlets, in the subfamily Dipsadinae of the family Colubridae. The genus contains nine described species.

== Description ==
Snakes of the genus Arrhyton share the following characters. The maxillary bone is short, with eight small teeth, which are followed, after a large interspace by a strongly enlarged fang. The mandibular teeth are small and equal. The head is slightly distinct from the neck. The eye is rather small, with a round pupil. The body is cylindrical in cross-section. The dorsal scales are smooth, without apical pits, and are arranged in 15 or 17 rows. The ventrals are rounded. The tail is moderately long. The subcaudals are in two rows.

== Geographic range ==
Species in the genus Arrhyton are found in Cuba, Jamaica, Puerto Rico, and the British Virgin Islands.

== Species ==
The following species are recognized as being valid.

- Arrhyton ainictum Schwartz & Garrido, 1981 – Cuban island racer
- Arrhyton albicollum Díaz, Fong, Salas & Hedges, 2021 – Gibara white-collared racerlet
- Arrhyton dolichura F. Werner, 1909 – Habana island racer
- Arrhyton procerum Hedges & Garrido, 1992 – Zapata long-tailed groundsnake
- Arrhyton redimitum (Cope, 1862) – Oriente brown-capped racerlet
- Arrhyton supernum Hedges & Garrido, 1992 – Oriente black groundsnake
- Arrhyton taeniatum Günther, 1858 – Günther's island racer
- Arrhyton tanyplectum Schwartz & Garrido, 1981 – San Vincente island racer
- Arrhyton vittatum (Gundlach, 1861) – common island racer

Nota bene: A binomial authority in parentheses indicates that the species was originally described in a genus other than Arrhyton.
