= Eleutherodactylus adelus =

Conservation status
- Endangered (IUCN 3.1)

Scientific classification
- Kingdom: Animalia
- Phylum: Chordata
- Class: Amphibia
- Order: Anura
- Family: Eleutherodactylidae
- Genus: Eleutherodactylus
- Species: E. adelus

Binomial name
- Eleutherodactylus adelus Diaz, Cadiz, and Hedges, 2003

Species of amphibian

Eleutherodactylus adelus, the Cuban dwarf grassfrog, is a species of frogs in the family Eleutherodactylidae. It is a fairly small frog for its genus. It is endemic to western Cuba, where it inhabits Pinus tropicalis pine forests in the Pinar del Río Province. It is known from three localities in the municipalities of San Juan y Martínez, Viñales, and Pinar del Río at elevations of 130–220 m (430–720 ft). It is usually seen hidden in leaf litter and ground vegetation. It is classified as being endangered by the IUCN due to its fairly limited range, which is suffering from ongoing habitat degradation due to logging and wildfires.

== Taxonomy ==
Eleutherodactylus adelus was formally described in 2003 based on an adult male specimen collected from Loma del Espejo, a mountain in the province of Pinar del Río in Cuba. The specific epithet is derived from the Greek word adelos, meaning 'concealed', referring to the frog's habit of ceasing vocalizations upon being approached by humans. It has the English common name Cuban dwarf grassfrog.

The scientists describing the species placed it in the subgenus Euhyas and posited that it was most closely related to Eleutherodactylus varleyi. A 2008 classification maintained this placement, putting E. adelus in the E. gundlachi species group, alongside E. varleyi, albeit without any new data to support this placement. A 2011 study of mitochondrial DNA instead found E. pezopetrus to be the closest relative of E. adelus.

== Description ==
Eleutherodactylus adelus is a fairly small frog for its genus. The belly is beige or greenish. The limbs have light to medium-dark brown stripes. The forearms are reddish-brown.

Vocalizations consist of three to six chirped notes, each of which lasts 9.1–14.2 milliseconds. The total length of the call is 236–682 milliseconds. The broadcast of these longer calls is preceded by simpler, one or two note long calls. Males vocalize from under grass and leaf litter on the ground both diurnally and nocturnally, especially after rain, making anywhere from 20.6 to 65.2 calls each minute.

== Distribution ==
Eleutherodactylus adelus is endemic to western Cuba, where it inhabits Pinus tropicalis pine forests in the Pinar del Río Province. It was initially documented form the locality of Loma del Espejo in San Juan y Martínez, before being collected from near El Moncada in Viñales, roughly 22 km (14 mi) east of Loma del Espejo. It has also been documented through its vocalizations from Hoyo del Guamá in Pinar del Río municipality, leading to an estimated extent of occurrence of 407 km^{2}. In its type locality, the species was mostly found hidden in leaf litter and ground vegetation. It is known from elevations of 130–220 m (430–720 ft).

Clutches have three or four eggs, which undergo direct development. These clutches are laid on the ground.

== Conservation ==
Eleutherodactylus adelus is classified as being endangered by the IUCN due to its circumscribed range, which is suffering from ongoing habitat degradation due to logging and wildfires. It can be somewhat common in certain localities, but is hard to find and has never been seen outside forested areas. It is the only frog on Cuba which does not inhabit any demarcated protected area, making it vulnerable to habitat loss due to logging and pig farming. It is classified in the category Vulnerable D2 on the Red Book of Vertebrates in Cuba.
