= Anolis confusus =

Conservation status
- Endangered (IUCN 3.1)

Scientific classification
- Kingdom: Animalia
- Phylum: Chordata
- Order: Squamata
- Suborder: Iguania
- Family: Anolidae
- Genus: Anolis
- Species: A. confusus

Binomial name
- Anolis confusus Estrada & Garrido, 1991

Species of lizard

Anolis confusus, the Cabo Cruz trunk anole, is a species of lizard in the family Dactyloidae, endemic to Cuba.
