= Eleutherodactylus mariposa =

Conservation status
- Critically Endangered (IUCN 3.1)

Scientific classification
- Kingdom: Animalia
- Phylum: Chordata
- Class: Amphibia
- Order: Anura
- Clade: Brachycephaloidea
- Family: Eleutherodactylidae
- Genus: Eleutherodactylus
- Species: E. mariposa

Binomial name
- Eleutherodactylus mariposa Hedges, Estrada & Thomas, 1992

Species of amphibian

Eleutherodactylus mariposa is a species of frog in the family Eleutherodactylidae endemic to Cuba. Its natural habitat is subtropical or tropical moist lowland forest. It is threatened by habitat loss.
