= Anolis vescus =

Scientific classification
- Kingdom: Animalia
- Phylum: Chordata
- Class: Reptilia
- Order: Squamata
- Suborder: Iguania
- Family: Dactyloidae
- Genus: Anolis
- Species: A. vescus

Binomial name
- Anolis vescus Garrido and Hedges, 1992

Species of lizard

Anolis vescus, the Sierra Del Purial bush anole or Purial bush anole, is a species of lizard in the family Dactyloidae. The species is endemic to Cuba.
