= Eleutherodactylus toa =

Conservation status
- Endangered (IUCN 3.1)

Scientific classification
- Kingdom: Animalia
- Phylum: Chordata
- Class: Amphibia
- Order: Anura
- Clade: Brachycephaloidea
- Family: Eleutherodactylidae
- Genus: Eleutherodactylus
- Species: E. toa

Binomial name
- Eleutherodactylus toa Estrada & Hedges, 1991

Species of frog

Eleutherodactylus toa is a species of frog in the family Eleutherodactylidae endemic to Cuba. Its natural habitats are subtropical or tropical moist lowland forest and rivers. It is threatened by habitat loss.
