= Turquino collared sphaero =

Conservation status
- Data Deficient (IUCN 3.1)

Scientific classification
- Kingdom: Animalia
- Phylum: Chordata
- Class: Reptilia
- Order: Squamata
- Suborder: Gekkota
- Family: Sphaerodactylidae
- Genus: Sphaerodactylus
- Species: S. cricoderus

Binomial name
- Sphaerodactylus cricoderus Thomas, Hedges & Garrido, 1992

Species of lizard

The Turquino collared sphaero (Sphaerodactylus cricoderus) is a species of lizard in the family Sphaerodactylidae. The species is endemic to Cuba.
