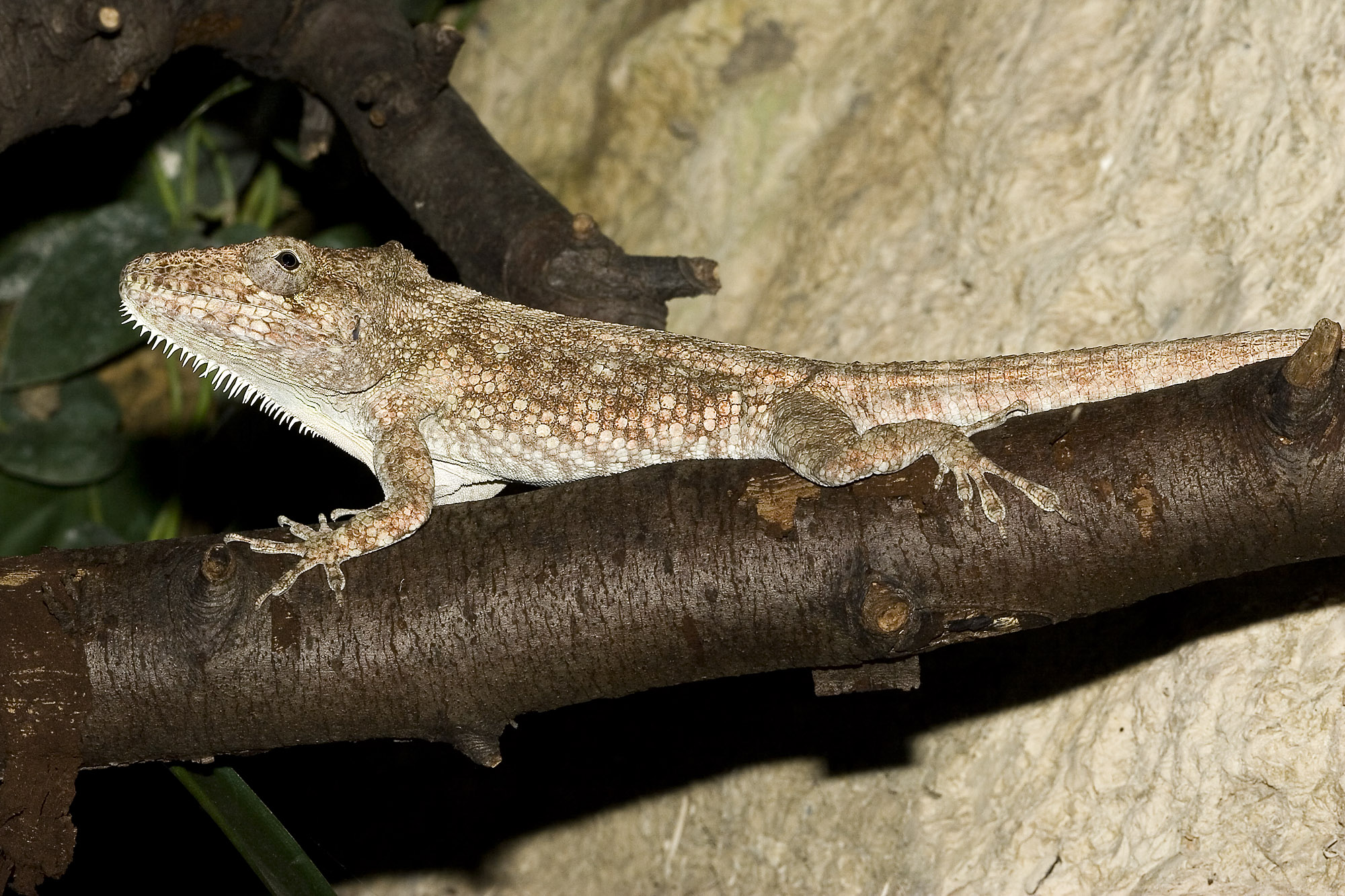

Conservation status
- Near Threatened (IUCN 3.1)"Anolis barbatus | IUCN Red List". iucnredlist.org.

Scientific classification
- Kingdom: Animalia
- Phylum: Chordata
- Order: Squamata
- Suborder: Iguania
- Family: Anolidae
- Genus: Anolis
- Species: A. barbatus

Binomial name
- Anolis barbatus Garrido, 1982

Synonyms
- Chamaeleolis barbatus; Xiphosurus barbatus

= Anolis barbatus =

Western bearded anole

Species of lizard

Anolis barbatus (western bearded anole or Cuban false chameleon) is a species of anole lizard from Western Cuba. Adults have a typical snout–vent length of about 18 cm (7 in), with tails that are slightly shorter than their bodies, and demonstrate little sexual dimorphism. It is one of six species called "false chameleons" that sometimes are recognized as their own genus Chamaeleolis or as the Cuban clade in Xiphosurus. These are all native to Cuba, fairly large for anoles, have robust heads, are dull gray-brown in color, slow-moving and have blunt teeth used for crushing snails, which is their main diet in the wild. Unusually among anoles, these all lack the ability to autotomize their tails. Together with the similar (in appearance and microhabitat), but not closely related A. landestoyi of Hispaniola, they form a group known as the twig–giant ecomorph.

Like other anoles, these stealthy creatures also have toe pads much like those found in geckos. This allows them to jump, run, or hide on just about any surface. Studies have found that Anolis barbatus spends a majority of its time stationary. These anoles typically only move to feed, escape predators and display to other lizards for mating. Although generally slow-moving to hide from the eyes of predators, western bearded anoles can be very quick creatures when it comes to feeding and running from predators.

== See also ==
- List of Anolis lizards
