= Arrhyton procerum =

Conservation status
- Data Deficient (IUCN 3.1)

Scientific classification
- Kingdom: Animalia
- Phylum: Chordata
- Order: Squamata
- Suborder: Serpentes
- Family: Colubridae
- Genus: Arrhyton
- Species: A. procerum

Binomial name
- Arrhyton procerum Hedges & Garrido. 1992

Species of snake

Arrhyton procerum, the Zapata long-tailed racerlet or Zapata long-tailed groundsnake is a species of snake in the family Colubridae. It is found in Cuba.
