= Eleutherodactylus rivularis =

Conservation status
- Critically Endangered (IUCN 3.1)

Scientific classification
- Kingdom: Animalia
- Phylum: Chordata
- Class: Amphibia
- Order: Anura
- Clade: Brachycephaloidea
- Family: Eleutherodactylidae
- Genus: Eleutherodactylus
- Species: E. rivularis

Binomial name
- Eleutherodactylus rivularis Díaz, Estrada & Hedges, 2001

Species of amphibian

Eleutherodactylus rivularis is a species of frog in the family Eleutherodactylidae endemic to Cuba. Its natural habitats are subtropical or tropical moist lowland forest and rivers. It is threatened by habitat loss.
