= Ghost anole =

There are two species of lizard named ghost anole:

- Anolis lemurinus, found in Central and South America
- Anolis spectrum, found in Cuba
