= Anolis macilentus =

Scientific classification
- Kingdom: Animalia
- Phylum: Chordata
- Order: Squamata
- Suborder: Iguania
- Family: Anolidae
- Genus: Anolis
- Species: A. macilentus

Binomial name
- Anolis macilentus Garrido & Hedges, 1992

Species of lizard

Anolis macilentus, the black-cheeked bush anole, is a species of lizard in the family Dactyloidae. The species is found in Cuba.
