= Arrhyton albicollum =

Scientific classification
- Domain: Eukaryota
- Kingdom: Animalia
- Phylum: Chordata
- Class: Reptilia
- Order: Squamata
- Suborder: Serpentes
- Family: Colubridae
- Genus: Arrhyton
- Species: A. albicollum

Binomial name
- Arrhyton albicollum Diaz, Fong, Salas, & Hedges, 2021

Species of snake

Arrhyton albicollum, the Gibara white-collared racerlet is a species of snake in the family Colubridae. It is found in Cuba.
