= Camagüey (disambiguation) =

Camagüey is a city and municipality in central Cuba.

Camagüey or Camaguey may also refer to:

== Sports teams ==
- Camagüey, a defunct baseball team of the Cuban National Series, active before 1977
- FC Camagüey, a football (soccer) team playing in the Cuban National Football League
- Toros de Camagüey, a baseball team in the Cuban National Series, formed in 1977

== Other uses ==
- Camaguey Air Base, World War II name of what is now Ignacio Agramonte International Airport
- Camaguey least gecko, a small species of gecko endemic to Cuba (Sphaerodactylus scaber)
- Camagüey Province, the largest of the provinces of Cuba
- Camagüey railway station, the main railway station of the city of Camagüey, Cuba
- Sabana-Camagüey Archipelago, a geographic feature on Cuba's north-central Atlantic coast
- University of Camagüey, a public university located in Camagüey, Cuba
