= A. bartschi =

A. bartschi may refer to:

- Aerodramus bartschi, the Mariana swiftlet or Guam swiftlet, a bird species
- Anolis bartschi, the West Cuban anole, a lizard species
