= Arrhyton supernum =

Conservation status
- Data Deficient (IUCN 3.1)

Scientific classification
- Kingdom: Animalia
- Phylum: Chordata
- Order: Squamata
- Suborder: Serpentes
- Family: Colubridae
- Genus: Arrhyton
- Species: A. supernum

Binomial name
- Arrhyton supernum Hedges & Garrido. 1992

Species of snake

Arrhyton supernum, the Oriente black racerlet or Oriente black groundsnake, is a species of snake in the family Colubridae. It is found in Cuba.
