= Eleutherodactylus riparius =

Conservation status
- Least Concern (IUCN 3.1)

Scientific classification
- Kingdom: Animalia
- Phylum: Chordata
- Class: Amphibia
- Order: Anura
- Clade: Brachycephaloidea
- Family: Eleutherodactylidae
- Genus: Eleutherodactylus
- Species: E. riparius

Binomial name
- Eleutherodactylus riparius Estrada & Hedges, 1998

Species of amphibian

Eleutherodactylus riparius is a species of frog in the family Eleutherodactylidae endemic to Cuba. Its natural habitats are subtropical or tropical moist lowland forest, subtropical or tropical moist shrubland, subtropical or tropical seasonally wet or flooded lowland grassland, rivers, swampland, intermittent freshwater marshes, freshwater springs, arable land, pastureland, plantations, rural gardens, urban areas, heavily degraded former forest, irrigated land, and seasonally flooded agricultural land. It is threatened by habitat loss.
