= Anolis guafe =

Conservation status
- Endangered (IUCN 3.1)

Scientific classification
- Kingdom: Animalia
- Phylum: Chordata
- Order: Squamata
- Suborder: Iguania
- Family: Anolidae
- Genus: Anolis
- Species: A. guafe

Binomial name
- Anolis guafe Estrada & Garrido, 1991

Species of lizard

Anolis guafe, the Cabo Cruz banded anole, is a species of lizard in the family Dactyloidae. The species is found in Cuba.
