= Eleutherodactylus tetajulia =

Conservation status
- Critically Endangered (IUCN 3.1)

Scientific classification
- Kingdom: Animalia
- Phylum: Chordata
- Class: Amphibia
- Order: Anura
- Clade: Brachycephaloidea
- Family: Eleutherodactylidae
- Genus: Eleutherodactylus
- Subgenus: Euhyas
- Species: E. tetajulia

Binomial name
- Eleutherodactylus tetajulia Estrada and Hedges, 1996

Synonyms
- Euhyas tetajulia (Estrada and Hedges, 1996)

Species of amphibian

Eleutherodactylus tetajulia is a species of frog in the family Eleutherodactylidae. It is endemic to southeastern Cuba and is known from the Sierra de Cristal, Monte Iberia, Tetas de Julia, and Meseta del Toldo in the Holguín and Guantánamo Provinces. The specific name tetajulia refers to Las Tetas de Julia (=the breasts of Julia), a pair of prominent peaks on Monte Iberia, near the type locality of this species.

== Description ==
Three adult males in the type series measure 11.6–12.3 mm (0.46–0.48 in) and two adult females 13–14 mm (0.5–0.6 in) in snout–vent length. The head is as wide as the body, The snout is subacuminate. The tympanum is round and dorsally concealed by the supra-tympanic fold. The fingers and the toes have weak lateral ridges. Skin is dorsally weakly rugose and ventrally smooth. The dorsal ground color is coppery brown. There is a dark brown middorsal hour glass-shaped marking, narrow, black interocular bar, dark brown horseshoe-shaped sacral marking, and black supra-tympanic and groin bars. The venter is purple with white marking.

The male advertisement call is a series of 4–13 (mean 9.4) evenly spaced "chirps".

== Habitat and conservation ==
Eleutherodactylus tetajulia is a terrestrial frog occurring in closed mesic forests at elevations of 300–600 m (980–1,970 ft) above sea level. The type series was collected at night while the animals were active on leaf litter. One pair, a male and a female, were found in a hole formed by the decayed center of a tree fern some 10 cm (4 in) above the ground. Along with them were six eggs, probably from another female. Development is direct (i.e., no free-living larval stage).

This species is threatened by habitat destruction and deforestation caused by subsistence farming and charcoaling; also mining is a potential threat. It occurs in the Alejandro de Humboldt National Park, but the park is not effectively managed.
