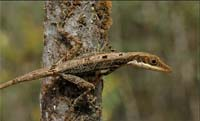

Conservation status
- Data Deficient (IUCN 3.1)

Scientific classification
- Kingdom: Animalia
- Phylum: Chordata
- Order: Squamata
- Suborder: Iguania
- Family: Anolidae
- Genus: Anolis
- Species: A. alfaroi

Binomial name
- Anolis alfaroi Garrido & Hedges, 1992

= Anolis alfaroi =

Species of lizard

Anolis alfaroi, the small-fanned bush anole, is a species of lizard in the family Dactyloidae. The species is found in Cuba.
