= Eleutherodactylus principalis =

Conservation status
- Endangered (IUCN 3.1)

Scientific classification
- Kingdom: Animalia
- Phylum: Chordata
- Class: Amphibia
- Order: Anura
- Clade: Brachycephaloidea
- Family: Eleutherodactylidae
- Genus: Eleutherodactylus
- Subgenus: Eleutherodactylus
- Species: E. principalis

Binomial name
- Eleutherodactylus principalis Estrada and Hedges, 1997

Species of amphibian

Eleutherodactylus principalis is a species of frog in the family Eleutherodactylidae. It is endemic to eastern Cuba and found in the upland regions of Holguín and Guantánamo Provinces. Its natural habitats are mesic, closed forests at elevations of 300–1,000 m (980–3,280 ft) above sea level. It is an arboreal species that is moderately common within suitable habitat. It is threatened by habitat loss caused by mining and agriculture. It occurs in the Alejandro de Humboldt National Park, but habitat loss is also occurring in the park.
