= Anolis vanidicus =

Conservation status
- Least Concern (IUCN 3.1)

Scientific classification
- Kingdom: Animalia
- Phylum: Chordata
- Class: Reptilia
- Order: Squamata
- Suborder: Iguania
- Family: Dactyloidae
- Genus: Anolis
- Species: A. vanidicus

Binomial name
- Anolis vanidicus Garrido & Schwartz, 1972

Species of lizard

Anolis vanidicus, the Escambray grass anole or Vanidicus anole, is a species of lizard in the family Dactyloidae. The species is found in Cuba.
