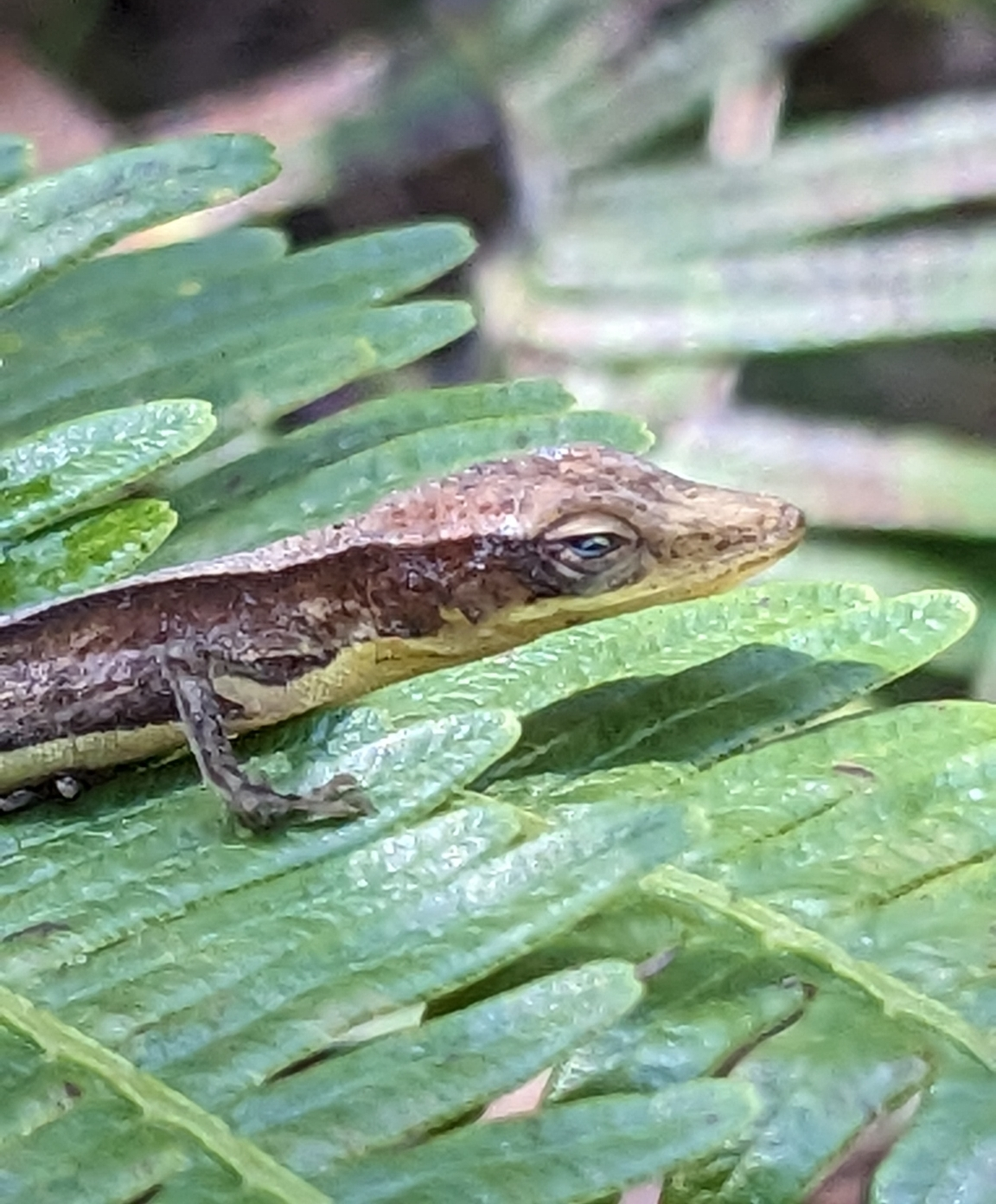

Conservation status
- Near Threatened (IUCN 3.1)

Scientific classification
- Kingdom: Animalia
- Phylum: Chordata
- Order: Squamata
- Suborder: Iguania
- Family: Anolidae
- Genus: Anolis
- Species: A. fugitivus

Binomial name
- Anolis fugitivus Garrido, 1975

= Anolis fugitivus =

Species of lizard

Anolis fugitivus, the green-headed grass anole or Moa anole, is a species of lizard in the family Dactyloidae. The species is found in Cuba.
