= Anolis pigmaequestris =

Conservation status
- Endangered (IUCN 3.1)

Scientific classification
- Kingdom: Animalia
- Phylum: Chordata
- Order: Squamata
- Suborder: Iguania
- Family: Anolidae
- Genus: Anolis
- Species: A. pigmaequestris

Binomial name
- Anolis pigmaequestris Garrido, 1975

Species of lizard

Anolis pigmaequestris, the pygmy giant anole or Cayo Frances anole, is a species of lizard in the family Dactyloidae. The species is found in Cuba.
