= Anolis anfiloquioi =

Conservation status
- Least Concern (IUCN 3.1)

Scientific classification
- Kingdom: Animalia
- Phylum: Chordata
- Order: Squamata
- Suborder: Iguania
- Family: Anolidae
- Genus: Anolis
- Species: A. anfiloquioi

Binomial name
- Anolis anfiloquioi Garrido, 1980

Species of lizard

Anolis anfiloquioi, the brown-eyed bush anole or Anfiodlul anole, is a species of lizard in the family Dactyloidae. The species is found in Cuba.
