= Eleutherodactylus melacara =

Conservation status
- Endangered (IUCN 3.1)

Scientific classification
- Kingdom: Animalia
- Phylum: Chordata
- Class: Amphibia
- Order: Anura
- Clade: Brachycephaloidea
- Family: Eleutherodactylidae
- Genus: Eleutherodactylus
- Species: E. melacara

Binomial name
- Eleutherodactylus melacara Hedges, Estrada & Thomas, 1992

Species of amphibian

Eleutherodactylus melacara is a species of frog in the family Eleutherodactylidae endemic to Sierra Maestra, Cuba. Its natural habitats are subtropical or tropical moist lowland forest and subtropical or tropical moist montane forest. It is threatened by habitat loss.
