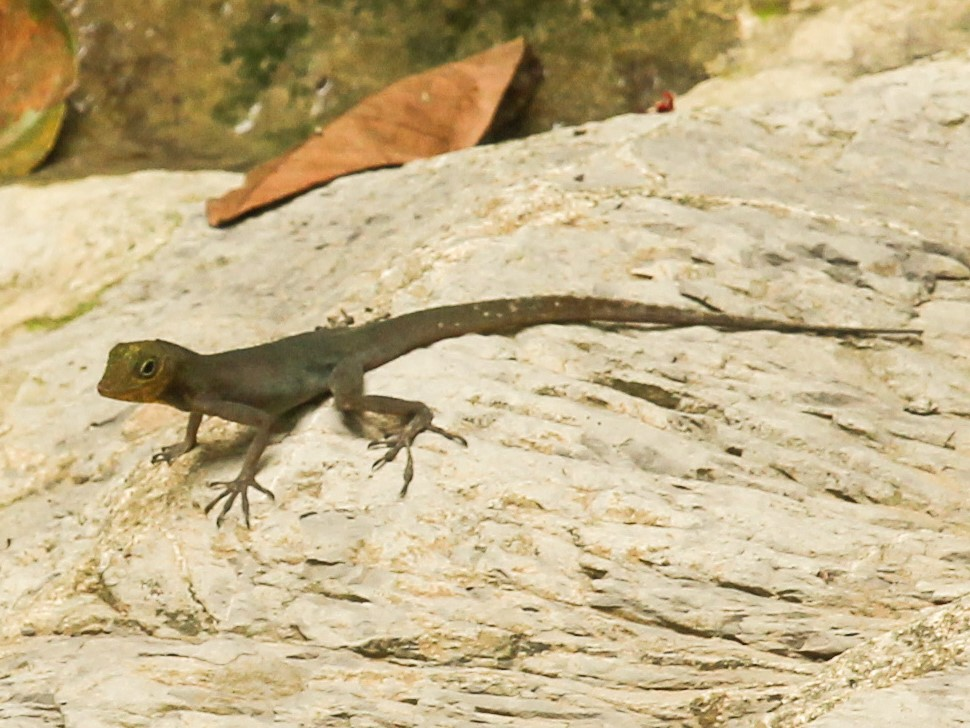

Conservation status
- Critically Endangered (IUCN 3.1)

Scientific classification
- Kingdom: Animalia
- Phylum: Chordata
- Class: Reptilia
- Order: Squamata
- Suborder: Iguania
- Family: Dactyloidae
- Genus: Anolis
- Species: A. eugenegrahami

Binomial name
- Anolis eugenegrahami Schwartz, 1978

= Anolis eugenegrahami =

Species of lizard

Anolis eugenegrahami, the Eugene's anole or the black stream anole, is a critically endangered species of lizard in the family Dactyloidae. This semi-aquatic species is endemic to northern Haiti.

== Etymology ==
The specific name, eugenegrahami, is in honor of herpetologist Eugene D. Graham Jr., who was one of the collectors of the holotype.

== Distribution and habitat ==
A. eugenegrahami is endemic to the Département du Nord in northern Haiti where it is only found 9 kilometres (5.6 mi) northeast of Plaisance. It strictly inhabits stream margins in areas with forest.

== Description and behavior ==
This species, A. eugenegrahami, is of moderate size, with extremely long limbs. Males can reach up to 72 mm (2.8 in) in snout–vent length and females up to 61 mm (2.4 in). Males and females are both very dark. The dewlap (male only) ranges from very dark gray to black, with the edge being lighter.

It is one of two semi-aquatic anoles from the Caribbean, the other being A. vermiculatus of Cuba, and there are a few additional semi-aquatic anoles in Central and South America. The semi-aquatic anoles are morphologically diverse and do not form a monophyletic group, but there is convergence in certain microstructures of their skin, making it highly hydrophobic. This results in a thin layer of air on the skin surface when submerged underwater, which they use as an extra air supply for breathing, and it also prevents water from staying on when exiting the water.

== See also ==
- List of Anolis lizards
