= Anolis incredulus =

Conservation status
- Data Deficient (IUCN 3.1)

Scientific classification
- Kingdom: Animalia
- Phylum: Chordata
- Order: Squamata
- Suborder: Iguania
- Family: Anolidae
- Genus: Anolis
- Species: A. incredulus

Binomial name
- Anolis incredulus Garrido & Moreno, 1998

Species of lizard

Anolis incredulus, the Turquino emerald anole, is a species of lizard in the family Dactyloidae. The species is found in Cuba.
