= Anolis agueroi =

Scientific classification
- Kingdom: Animalia
- Phylum: Chordata
- Order: Squamata
- Suborder: Iguania
- Family: Anolidae
- Genus: Anolis
- Species: A. agueroi

Binomial name
- Anolis agueroi (Diaz, Navarro, & Garrido, 1998)

Species of lizard

Anolis agueroi, the Cabo Cruz bearded anole, is a species of lizard in the family Dactyloidae. The species is found in Cuba.
