= Anolis birama =

Conservation status
- Endangered (IUCN 3.1)

Scientific classification
- Kingdom: Animalia
- Phylum: Chordata
- Order: Squamata
- Suborder: Iguania
- Family: Anolidae
- Genus: Anolis
- Species: A. birama

Binomial name
- Anolis birama Garrido, 1990

Species of lizard

Anolis birama, the Cuban big-eared anole or branch anole, is a species of lizard in the family Dactyloidae. The species is found in Cuba.
