= Anolis rejectus =

Scientific classification
- Kingdom: Animalia
- Phylum: Chordata
- Class: Reptilia
- Order: Squamata
- Suborder: Iguania
- Family: Dactyloidae
- Genus: Anolis
- Species: A. rejectus

Binomial name
- Anolis rejectus Garrido & Schwartz, 1972

Species of lizard

Anolis rejectus, the Santiago grass anole, is a species of lizard in the family Dactyloidae. The species is found in Cuba.
