= Anolis landestoyi =

Scientific classification
- Kingdom: Animalia
- Phylum: Chordata
- Class: Reptilia
- Order: Squamata
- Suborder: Iguania
- Family: Anolidae
- Genus: Anolis
- Species: A. landestoyi

Binomial name
- Anolis landestoyi Mahler, Lambert, Geneva, Ng, Hedges, Losos, & Glor, 2016

Species of lizard

Anolis landestoyi, the Hispaniolan chamaeleon anole, is a species of lizard in the family Dactyloidae. The species is found in the Dominican Republic.
