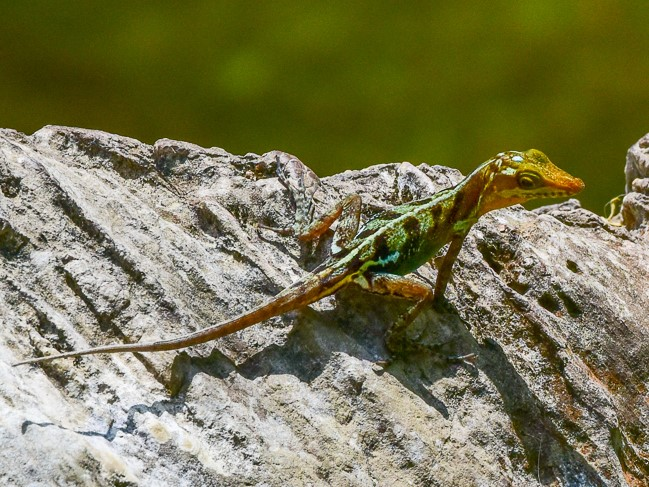

Conservation status
- Least Concern (IUCN 3.1)

Scientific classification
- Kingdom: Animalia
- Phylum: Chordata
- Class: Reptilia
- Order: Squamata
- Suborder: Iguania
- Family: Dactyloidae
- Genus: Anolis
- Species: A. vermiculatus

Binomial name
- Anolis vermiculatus Cocteau, 1837

Synonyms
- Deiroptyx vermiculata

= Anolis vermiculatus =

Species of lizard

Anolis vermiculatus, the Vinales anole or Cuban stream anole, is a species of lizard in the family Dactyloidae, endemic to Cuba.

== Range and habitat ==
A. vermiculatus is endemic to the Viñales region of Pinar del Río Province in western Cuba. It lives in densely vegetated and heavily shaded habitats close to water, typically streams.

== Description and behavior ==
This blue-eyed species is a relatively large anole with males reaching up to 12.3 cm (4.8 in) in snout-to-vent length and females up to 8.3 cm (3.3 in). It is one of only two anoles that completely lacks a dewlap (both sexes), the other being the West Cuban anole.

A. vermiculatus is fast to retreat and will dive into water to escape potential enemies, reportedly sometimes staying submerged for almost an hour. It can also run bipedally across water, similar to A. lionotus, A. poecilopus and A. oxylophus (all often in Norops instead) from Central America and Colombia, as well as the basilisks. A. vermiculatus feeds on small animals like frogs, shrimp and fish, which often are caught in water. It is one of two semi-aquatic anoles from the Caribbean, the other being A. eugenegrahami of Hispaniola, and there are a few additional semi-aquatic anoles in Central and South America. The semi-aquatic anoles are morphologically diverse and do not form a monophyletic group, but there is convergence in certain microstructures of their skin, making it highly hydrophobic. This results in a thin layer of air on the skin surface when submerged underwater, which they may use as an extra air supply for breathing, and it also prevents water from staying on when exiting the water.

== See also ==
- List of Anolis lizards
