= Diploglossus garridoi =

Conservation status
- Near Threatened (IUCN 3.1)

Scientific classification
- Kingdom: Animalia
- Phylum: Chordata
- Class: Reptilia
- Order: Squamata
- Suborder: Anguimorpha
- Family: Diploglossidae
- Genus: Diploglossus
- Species: D. garridoi

Binomial name
- Diploglossus garridoi Thomas & Hedges, 1998

Species of lizard

Diploglossus garridoi, also known commonly as the Cuban small-eared galliwasp, is a species of lizard in the family Diploglossidae. The species is endemic to Cuba.

== Etymology ==
The specific name, garridoi, is in honor of Cuban herpetologist Orlando H. Garrido.

== Geographic range ==
D. garridoi is found in Granma Province, Cuba.

== Habitat ==
The preferred natural habitat of D. garridoi is forest, at altitudes of 600–1,700 m (2,000–5,600 ft).

== Reproduction ==
D. garridoi is oviparous.
