= Anolis pumilus =

Conservation status
- Least Concern (IUCN 3.1)

Scientific classification
- Kingdom: Animalia
- Phylum: Chordata
- Order: Squamata
- Suborder: Iguania
- Family: Anolidae
- Genus: Anolis
- Species: A. pumilus

Binomial name
- Anolis pumilus Garrido, 1988

Species of lizard

Anolis pumilus, the Cuban spiny-plant anole, is a species of lizard in the family Dactyloidae. The species is found in Cuba.
