= Anolis delafuentei =

Conservation status
- Data Deficient (IUCN 3.1)

Scientific classification
- Kingdom: Animalia
- Phylum: Chordata
- Order: Squamata
- Suborder: Iguania
- Family: Anolidae
- Genus: Anolis
- Species: A. delafuentei

Binomial name
- Anolis delafuentei Garrido, 1982

Synonyms
- Anolis delafuentei Garrido, 1982; Norops delafuentei — Nicholson, 2002

Species of lizard

Anolis delafuentei, also known commonly as the Escambray crested anole and the Guamuhaya anole, is a species of lizard in the family Dactyloidae. The species is endemic to Cuba.

== Etymology ==
The specific name, delafuentei, is in honor of Argentinian herpetological paleontologist Marcelo S. de la Fuente.

== Habitat ==
The preferred natural habitat of A. delafuentei is forest, at an altitude of 700 m (2,300 ft).

== Description ==
A. delafuentei is known only from the holotype, which is a male with a snout-to-vent length (SVL) of 6 cm (2.4 in).

== Reproduction ==
A. delafuentei is oviparous.

== Taxonomy ==
A. delafuentei is a member of the A. sagrei species group.
