= Anolis guamuhaya =

Scientific classification
- Kingdom: Animalia
- Phylum: Chordata
- Order: Squamata
- Suborder: Iguania
- Family: Anolidae
- Genus: Anolis
- Species: A. guamuhaya

Binomial name
- Anolis guamuhaya (Garrido, Pérez-Beato, & Moreno, 1991)

Species of lizard

Anolis guamuhaya, the Escambray bearded anole, is a species of lizard in the family Dactyloidae. The species is found in Cuba.
