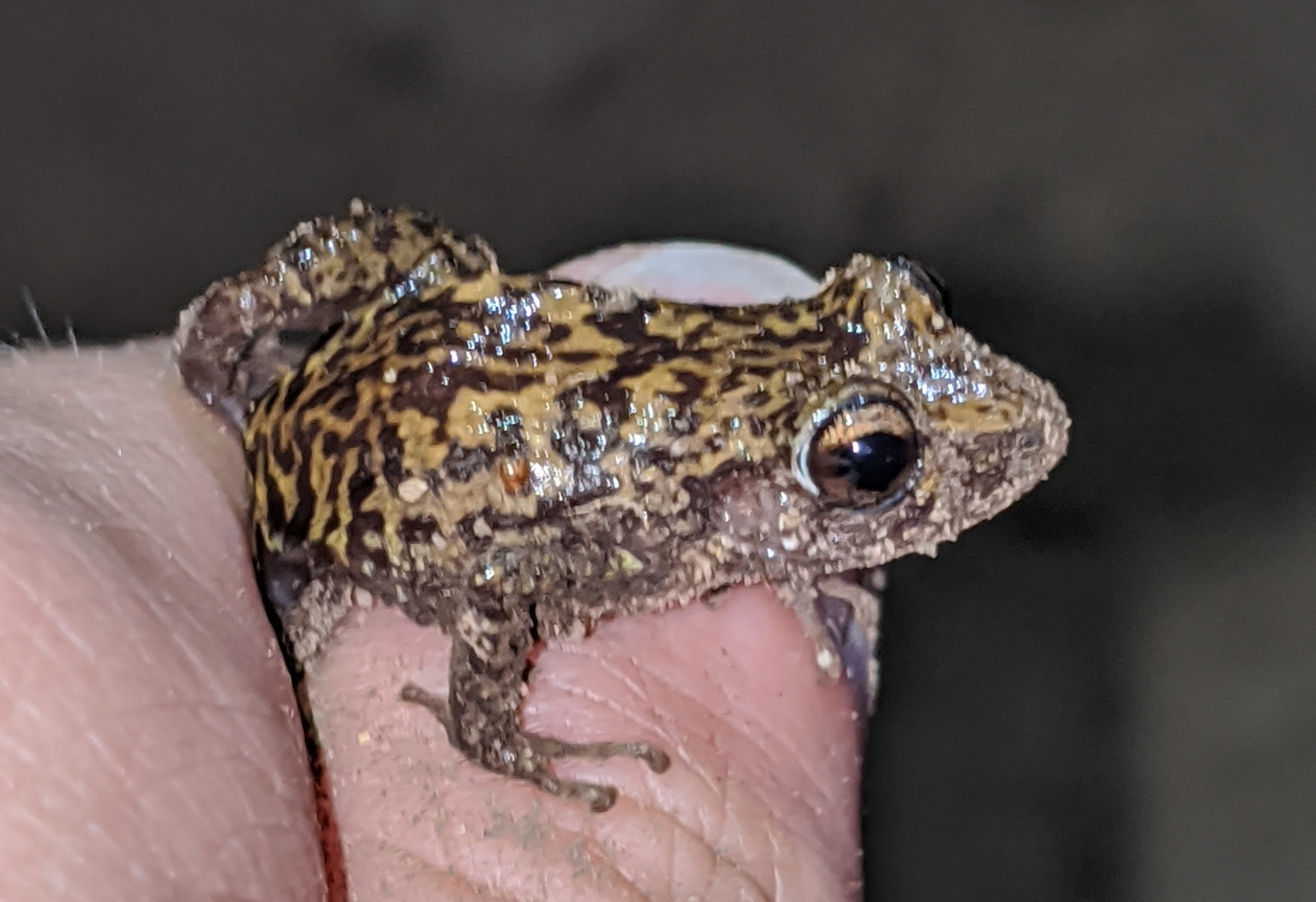

Conservation status
- Endangered (IUCN 3.1)

Scientific classification
- Kingdom: Animalia
- Phylum: Chordata
- Class: Amphibia
- Order: Anura
- Clade: Brachycephaloidea
- Family: Eleutherodactylidae
- Genus: Eleutherodactylus
- Species: E. guanahacabibes

Binomial name
- Eleutherodactylus guanahacabibes Estrada & Rodriguez, 1985

= Eleutherodactylus guanahacabibes =

Species of amphibian

Eleutherodactylus guanahacabibes is a species of frogs in the family Eleutherodactylidae endemic to Cuba, and is named for the Guanahacabibes Peninsula. Its natural habitats are subtropical or tropical moist lowland forest, rocky areas, and caves. It is threatened by habitat loss.
