= Arrhyton ainictum =

Conservation status
- Data Deficient (IUCN 3.1)

Scientific classification
- Kingdom: Animalia
- Phylum: Chordata
- Class: Reptilia
- Order: Squamata
- Suborder: Serpentes
- Family: Colubridae
- Genus: Arrhyton
- Species: A. ainictum

Binomial name
- Arrhyton ainictum Schwartz & Garrido. 1981

Species of snake

Arrhyton ainictum, the Las Tunas racerlet or Cuban Island racer, is a species of snake in the family Colubridae. It is found in Cuba.
