= Cabo Cruz banded sphaero =

Conservation status
- Data Deficient (IUCN 3.1)

Scientific classification
- Kingdom: Animalia
- Phylum: Chordata
- Order: Squamata
- Suborder: Gekkota
- Family: Sphaerodactylidae
- Genus: Sphaerodactylus
- Species: S. docimus

Binomial name
- Sphaerodactylus docimus Schwartz & Garrido, 1985

Species of lizard

The Cabo Cruz banded sphaero (Sphaerodactylus docimus) is a species of lizard in the family Sphaerodactylidae. It is endemic to Cuba.
