= Anolis ruibali =

Scientific classification
- Kingdom: Animalia
- Phylum: Chordata
- Class: Reptilia
- Order: Squamata
- Suborder: Iguania
- Family: Dactyloidae
- Genus: Anolis
- Species: A. ruibali

Binomial name
- Anolis ruibali Navarro & Garrido, 2004

Species of lizard

Anolis ruibali, the Cabo Cruz pallid anole, is a species of lizard in the family Dactyloidae. The species is found in Cuba.
