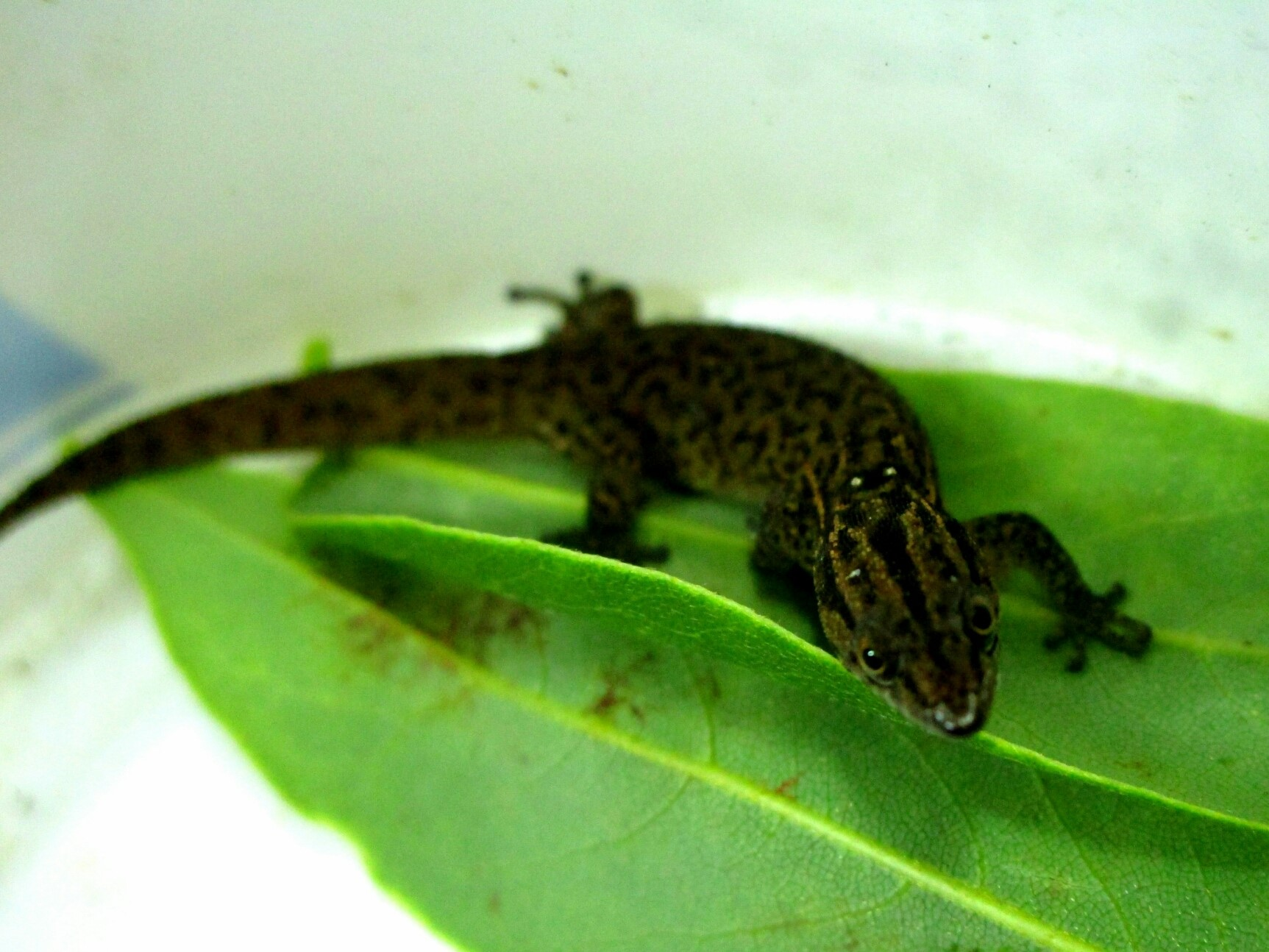

Conservation status
- Least Concern (IUCN 3.1)

Scientific classification
- Kingdom: Animalia
- Phylum: Chordata
- Order: Squamata
- Suborder: Gekkota
- Family: Sphaerodactylidae
- Genus: Sphaerodactylus
- Species: S. celicara

Binomial name
- Sphaerodactylus celicara Garrido & Schwartz, 1982

= Baracoan eyespot sphaero =

Species of lizard

The Baracoan eyespot sphaero (Sphaerodactylus celicara) is a species of lizard in the family Sphaerodactylidae. It is endemic to Cuba.
