= Caribherp =

Database of all amphibian and reptile species of all Caribbean islands

Caribherp is an online database containing information on amphibians and reptiles of the Caribbean Islands. It was established in 1999 and serves as a resource for determining the species that occur on specific islands, viewing their distributions, and identifying them by images. Besides the primary search capability by regions and islands, the site features a global search functionality and the ability to refine lists by taxon and origin (endemic or introduced), and to sort by various features. Caribherp also includes common and scientific names, sightings, images, videos, audio of frog calls, distribution maps, geographic regions, and conservation status provided by the International Union for Conservation of Nature (IUCN).

The development and maintenance of Caribherp is accomplished through the work of S. Blair Hedges and his colleagues, and students from Penn State University and (since 2014) Temple University.

== Contents ==
Caribherp database currently contains 1,022 reptile and amphibian species, maps for each species, and about 2000 professional images. This is 5% of the roughly 8,579 amphibian species and 11,940 reptiles species in the world. New species are continually being discovered and described.
