= Arrhyton dolichura =

Conservation status
- Data Deficient (IUCN 3.1)

Scientific classification
- Kingdom: Animalia
- Phylum: Chordata
- Class: Reptilia
- Order: Squamata
- Suborder: Serpentes
- Family: Colubridae
- Genus: Arrhyton
- Species: A. dolichura

Binomial name
- Arrhyton dolichura Werner, 1909

Species of snake

Arrhyton dolichura, the Havana racerlet or Habana Island racer , is a species of snake in the family Colubridae. It is found in Cuba.
