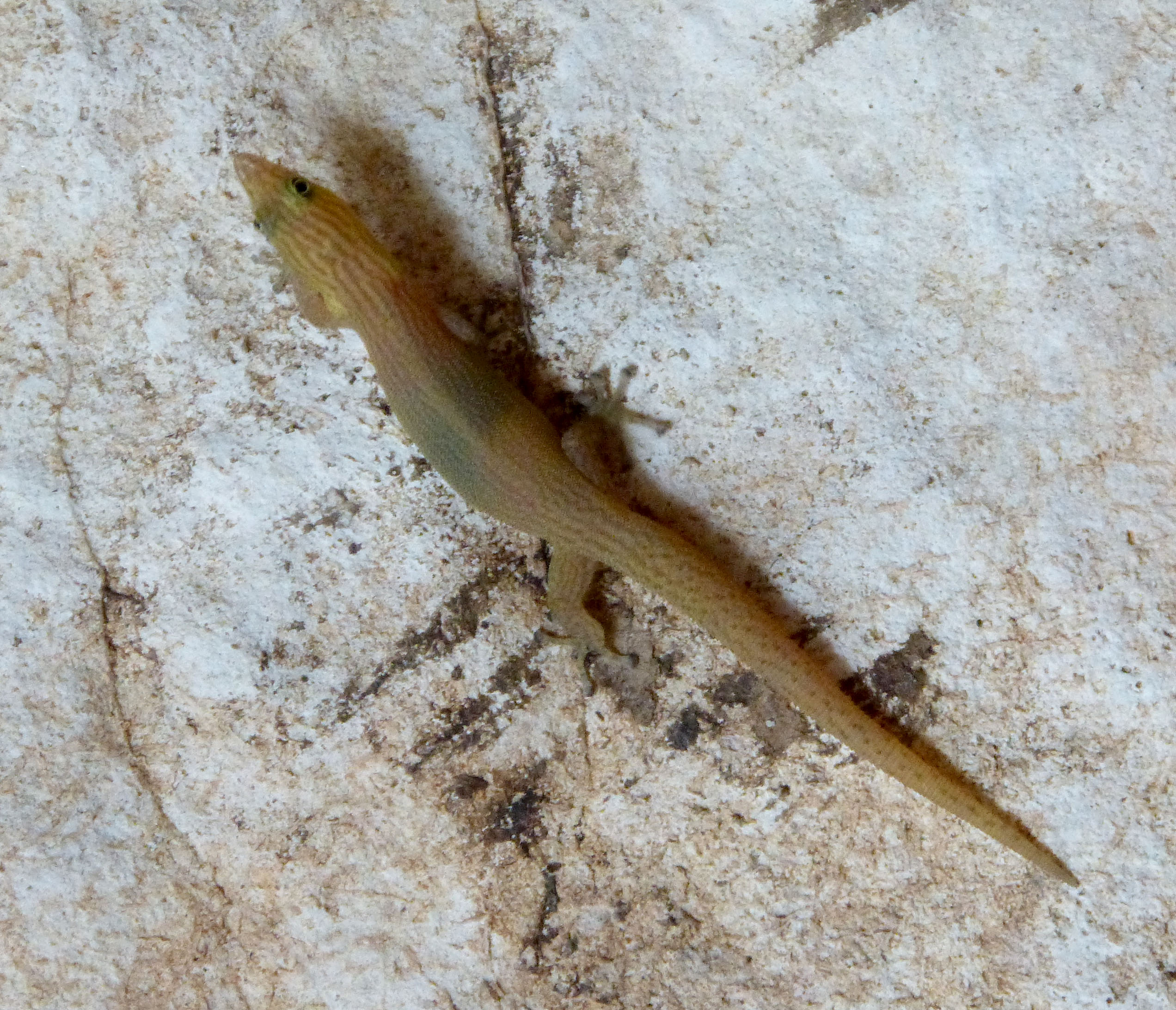

Conservation status
- Least Concern (IUCN 3.1)

Scientific classification
- Kingdom: Animalia
- Phylum: Chordata
- Class: Reptilia
- Order: Squamata
- Suborder: Gekkota
- Family: Sphaerodactylidae
- Genus: Sphaerodactylus
- Species: S. notatus

Binomial name
- Sphaerodactylus notatus Baird, 1859

= Sphaerodactylus notatus =

Species of reptile

Sphaerodactylus notatus, also known as the Florida reef gecko or brown-speckled sphaero, is a small species of gecko native to Florida and the Caribbean.

== Taxonomy ==
There are four subspecies: S. n. notatus (native to most of The Bahamas, Cuba, and Florida), S. n. amaurus (endemic to the Great Bahama Bank, on San Salvador Island and Cat Island), S. n. atactus (endemic to the Cayo Ballenatos, near Nuevitas in Cuba, and apparently introduced to the Morant and Pedro Cays in Jamaica and Great Inagua in the Bahamas), and S. n. peltastes (endemic to Little Bahama Bank). The taxonomic status of populations on Isla de la Juventud and the Canarreos Archipelago is uncertain.

== Distribution ==
It is found in Florida, Cuba and the Bahamas, and has been introduced to some offshore islands of Jamaica. Being found in Florida, it is widely considered to be one of the few geckos native to the United States. Many herpetologists have questioned whether it should truly be considered native; Stejneger and Barbour (1933) claimed that the species was accidentally introduced into Key West in 1878, when trade between Florida and Cuba was far more common; the same route is responsible for at least seven other herpetofaunal species established in Florida. There were past attempts to put this gecko on the threatened/endangered list, but due to the debate over its origins, it was denied. The reef gecko was detected in Florida circa 1850, around the times it became a U.S. territory, supporting the shipping-introduction theory. However, genetic evidence indicates that they originally colonized Key Largo, not Key West, likely by rafting, supporting a natural origin for the species in Florida.

The reef gecko can be found in both natural and man-made habitats. It is mainly found in damp forests, in shrubs, bushes, under logs, or in hollow timber. In Florida, its survival is closely linked to that of the seagrape (Coccoloba uvifera); the species was extirpated from some localities after devastating events such as Hurricane Irma, but recolonized these areas when the seagrape returned. Additionally, in Florida, the species is threatened by sea level rise, and it has disappeared from some known regions of habitation, including Everglades National Park, parts of Big Pine Key, and parts of Miami Beach. It has been petitioned that the Florida reef gecko be listed as an endangered species in the state of Florida, which would legally afford it beneficial protections.

== Description ==
Sphaerodactylus notatus is a small lizard, about two inches long. It feeds on insects and spiders.
