= Anolis paternus =

Conservation status
- Least Concern (IUCN 3.1)

Scientific classification
- Kingdom: Animalia
- Phylum: Chordata
- Class: Reptilia
- Order: Squamata
- Suborder: Iguania
- Family: Dactyloidae
- Genus: Anolis
- Species: A. paternus

Binomial name
- Anolis paternus Hardy, 1967

Species of lizard

Anolis paternus the ashy bush anole or Nueva Gerona anole, is a species of lizard in the family Dactyloidae. The species is found on Isla de la Juventud in Cuba.
