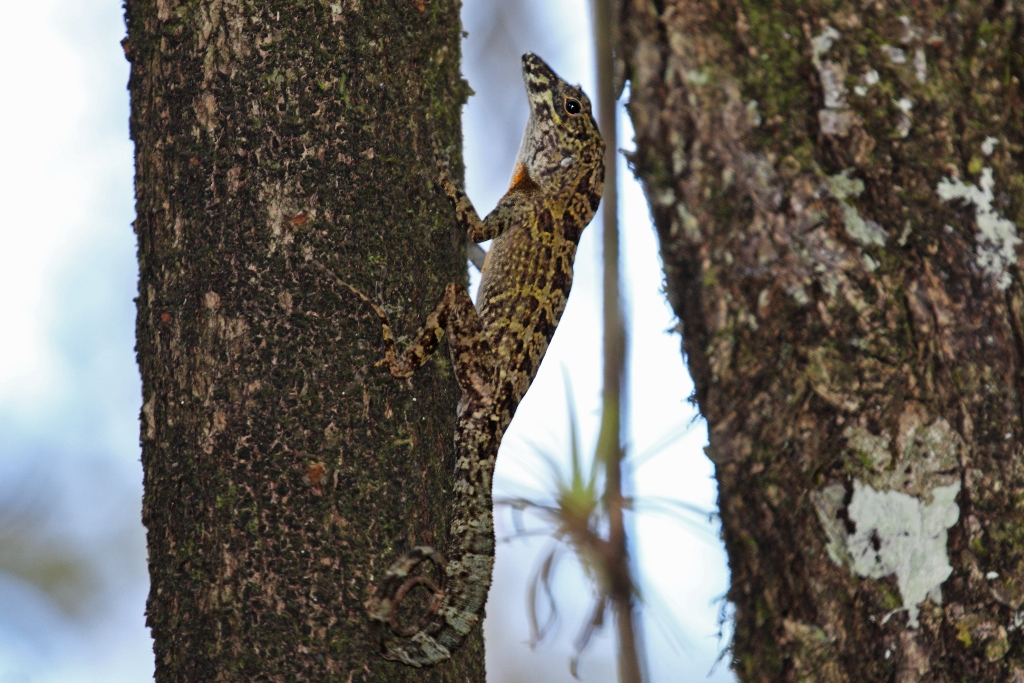

Conservation status
- Endangered (IUCN 3.1)

Scientific classification
- Kingdom: Animalia
- Phylum: Chordata
- Class: Reptilia
- Order: Squamata
- Suborder: Iguania
- Family: Anolidae
- Genus: Anolis
- Species: A. rubribarbus

Binomial name
- Anolis rubribarbus Barbour & Ramsden, 1919

Synonyms
- Anolis homolechis Barbour, 1937; Norops rubribarbus

= Anolis rubribarbus =

Species of lizard

Anolis rubribarbus, also known as the Sagua de Tánamo anole, is a species of lizard in the family Dactyloidae. The species is found in Cuba.
