= Anolis bremeri =

Conservation status
- Least Concern (IUCN 3.1)

Scientific classification
- Kingdom: Animalia
- Phylum: Chordata
- Class: Reptilia
- Order: Squamata
- Suborder: Iguania
- Family: Dactyloidae
- Genus: Anolis
- Species: A. bremeri

Binomial name
- Anolis bremeri Barbour, 1914

Species of lizard

Anolis bremeri, also known commonly as the Cuban variegated anole and the Herradura anole, is a species of lizard in the family Dactyloidae. The species is endemic to Cuba. Two subspecies are recognized.

== Etymology ==
The specific name, bremeri, is in honor of John Lewis Bremer (1874–1959), who was an American physician and anatomy professor.

== Description ==
A. bremeri is moderate-sized for its genus. Males are larger than females. Males may attain a snout-to-vent length (SVL) of 7.2 cm (2.8 in), but females do not exceed 5.2 cm (2.0 in) SVL.

== Reproduction ==
A. bremeri is oviparous.

== Subspecies ==
Two subspecies are recognized as being valid, including the nominotypical subspecies.

- Anolis bremeri bremeri Barbour, 1914 – Pinar del Río Province, Cuba
- Anolis bremeri insulaepinorum Garrido, 1972 – Isla de la Juventud (formerly called the Isle of Pines), Cuba
