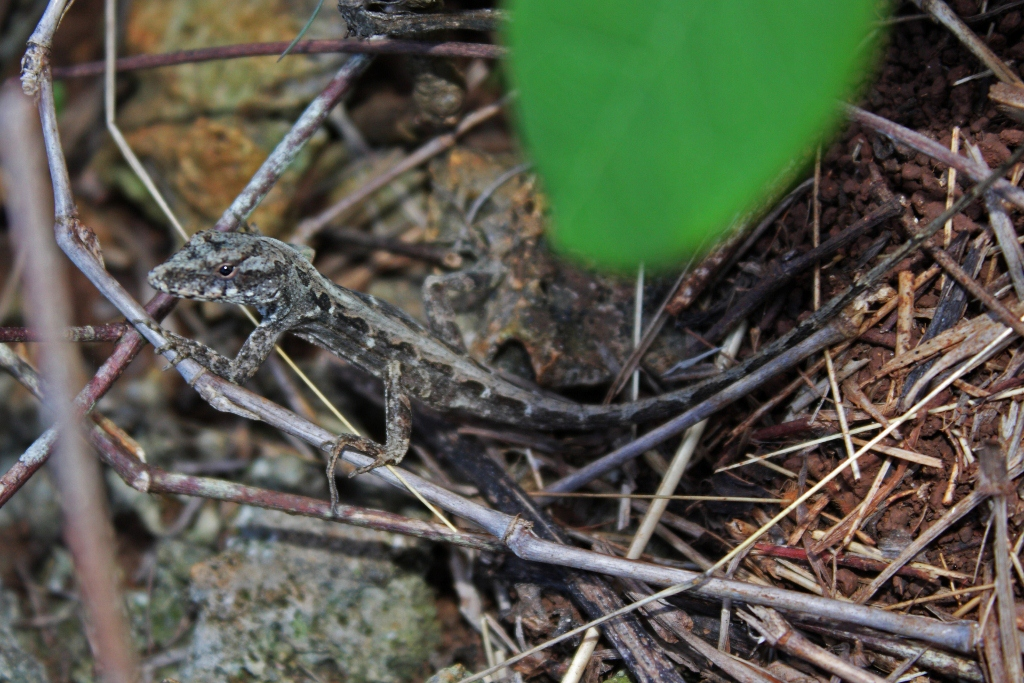

Conservation status
- Least Concern (IUCN 3.1)

Scientific classification
- Kingdom: Animalia
- Phylum: Chordata
- Class: Reptilia
- Order: Squamata
- Suborder: Iguania
- Family: Dactyloidae
- Genus: Anolis
- Species: A. argillaceus

Binomial name
- Anolis argillaceus Cope, 1862

= Anolis argillaceus =

Species of lizard

Anolis argillaceus, the Cuban dark bark anole or bay anole, is a species of lizard in the family Dactyloidae. The species is found in Cuba.
