= Anolis chamaeleonides =

Scientific classification
- Kingdom: Animalia
- Phylum: Chordata
- Class: Reptilia
- Order: Squamata
- Suborder: Iguania
- Family: Dactyloidae
- Genus: Anolis
- Species: A. chamaeleonides

Binomial name
- Anolis chamaeleonides Duméril & Bibron, 1837

Species of lizard

Anolis chamaeleonides, the short-bearded anole, is a species of lizard in the family Dactyloidae. The species is found in Cuba.
