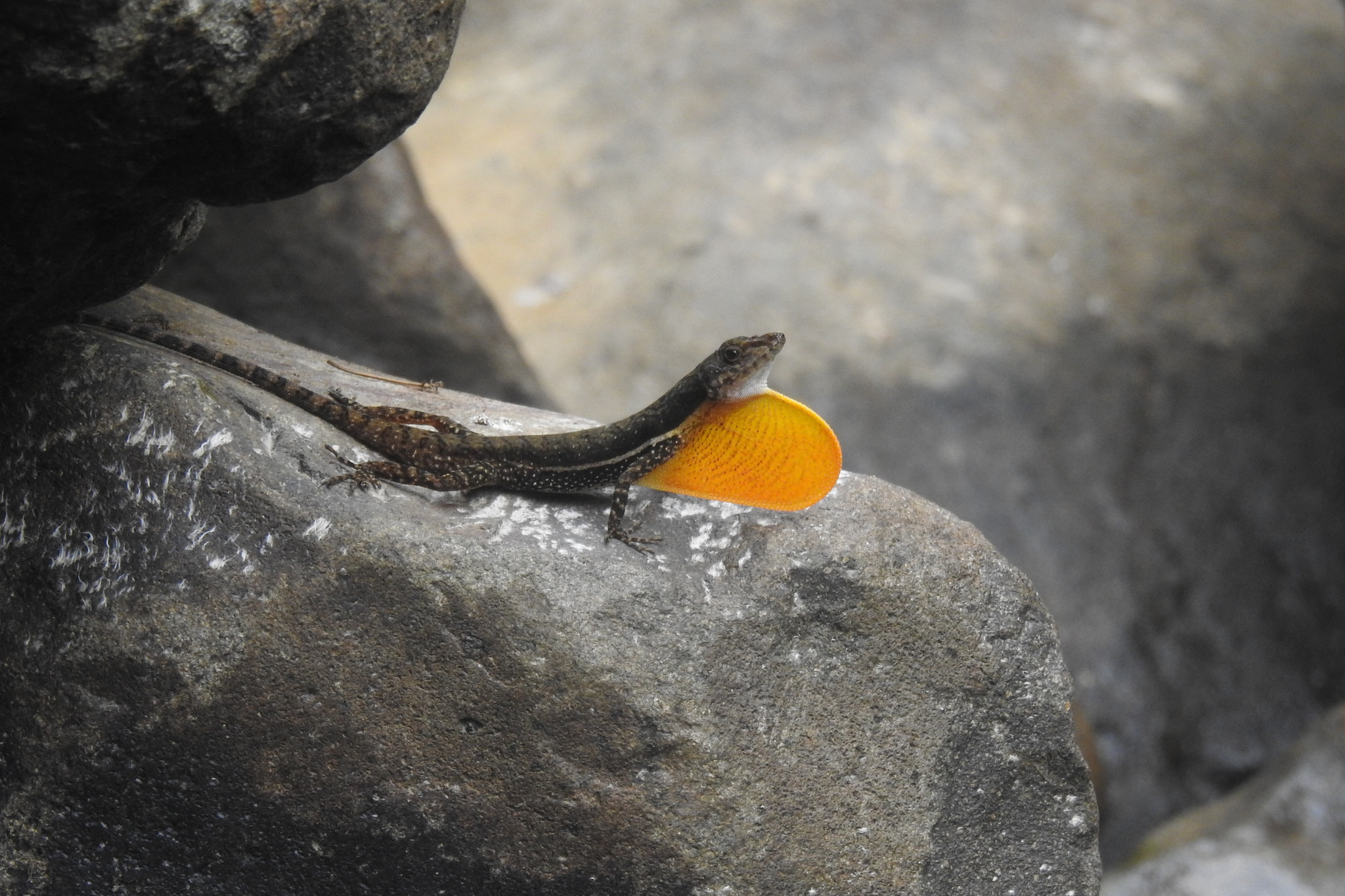

Conservation status
- Least Concern (IUCN 3.1)

Scientific classification
- Kingdom: Animalia
- Phylum: Chordata
- Class: Reptilia
- Order: Squamata
- Suborder: Iguania
- Family: Dactyloidae
- Genus: Anolis
- Species: A. oxylophus

Binomial name
- Anolis oxylophus Cope, 1875

= Anolis oxylophus =

Species of lizard

Anolis oxylophus, the stream anole, is a species of lizard in the family Dactyloidae. The species is found in Costa Rica, Nicaragua, Panama, and Honduras. This species is semi aquatic.

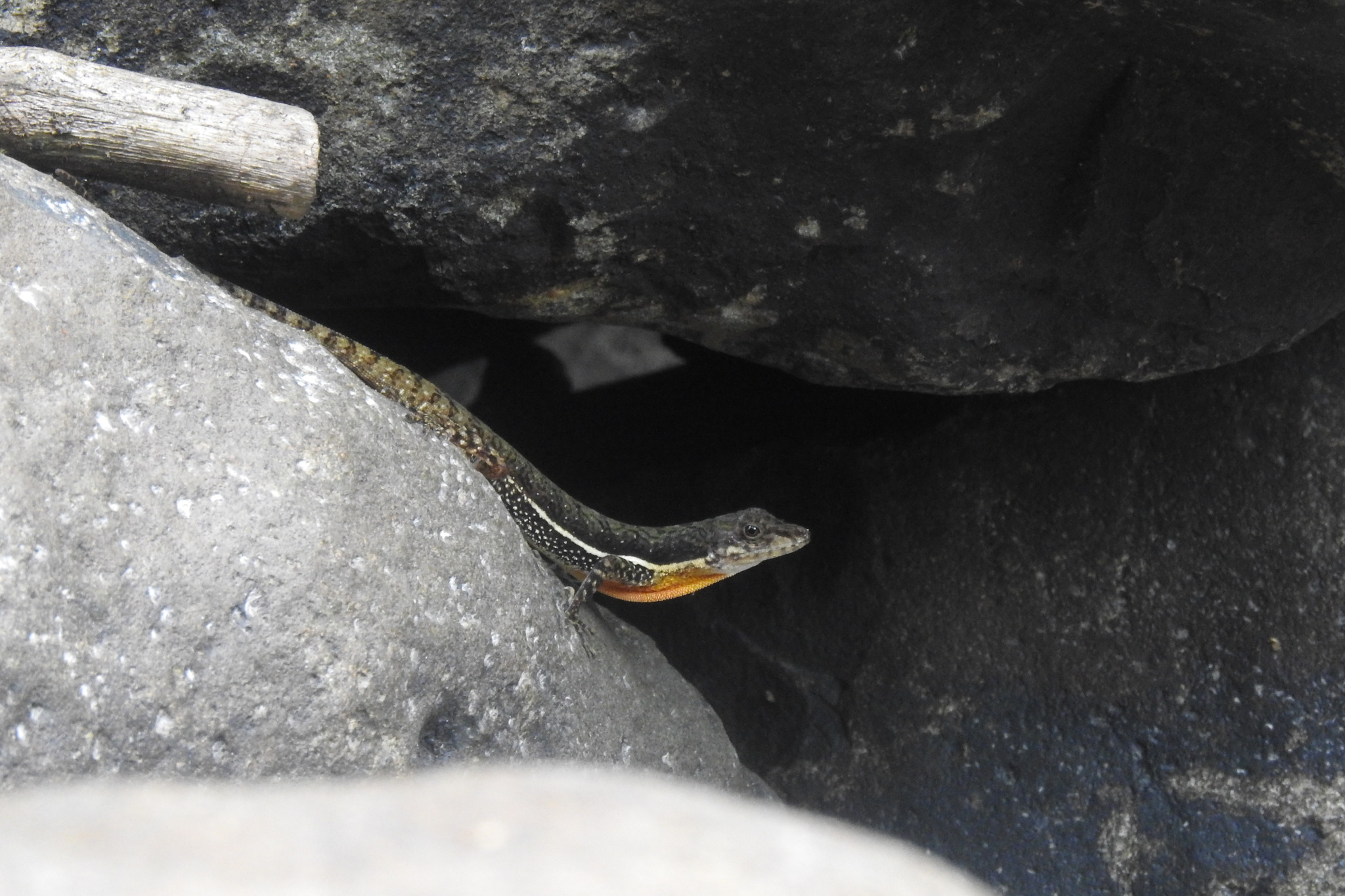
Dewlap retracted
