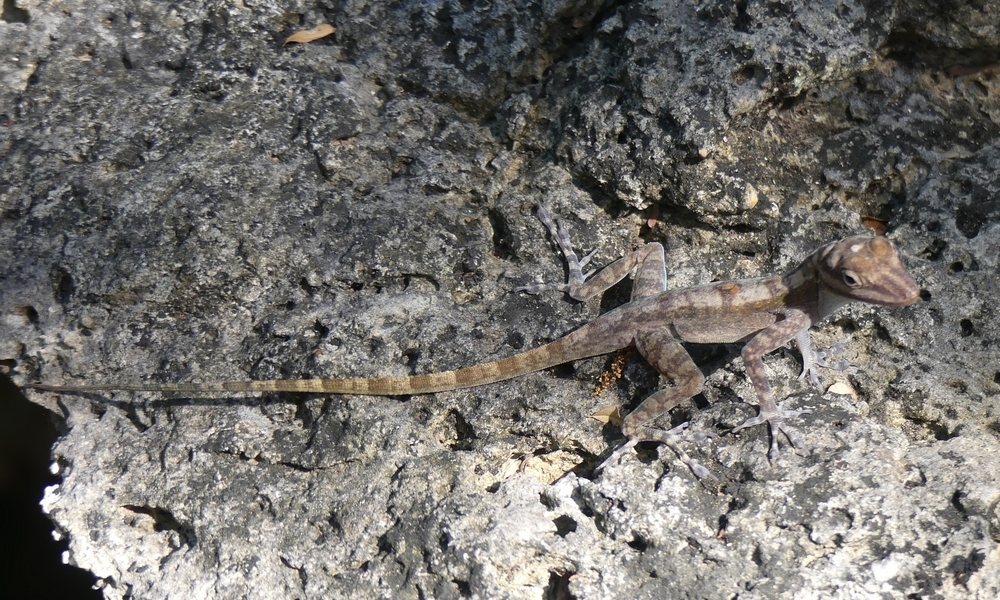

Conservation status
- Least Concern (IUCN 3.1)

Scientific classification
- Kingdom: Animalia
- Phylum: Chordata
- Class: Reptilia
- Order: Squamata
- Suborder: Iguania
- Family: Dactyloidae
- Genus: Anolis
- Species: A. lucius

Binomial name
- Anolis lucius Duméril & Bibron, 1837

= Anolis lucius =

Species of lizard

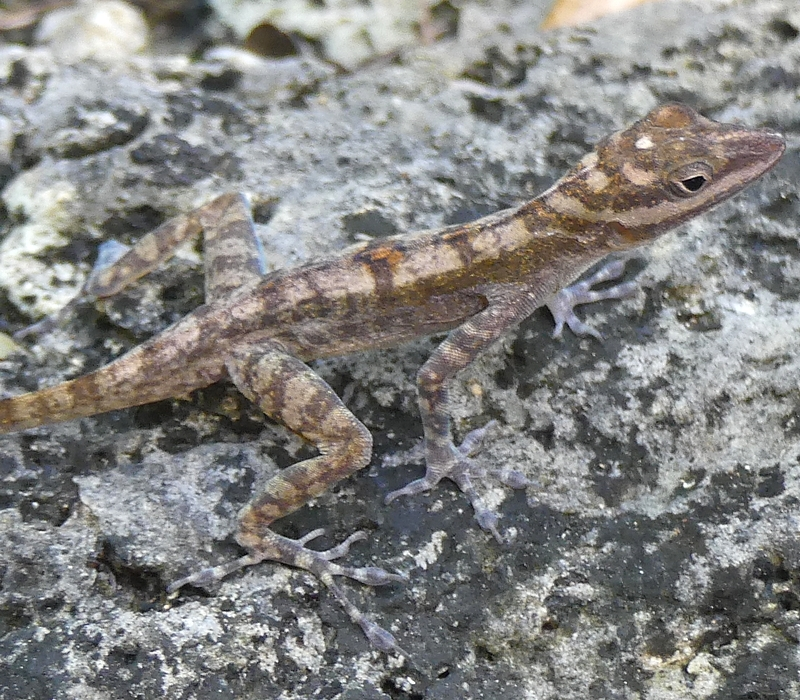
Anolis lucius sits on a rock in southern Cuba.

Anolis lucius, the cave anole or slender cliff anole, is a species of lizard in the family Dactyloidae. The species is found in Cuba.
