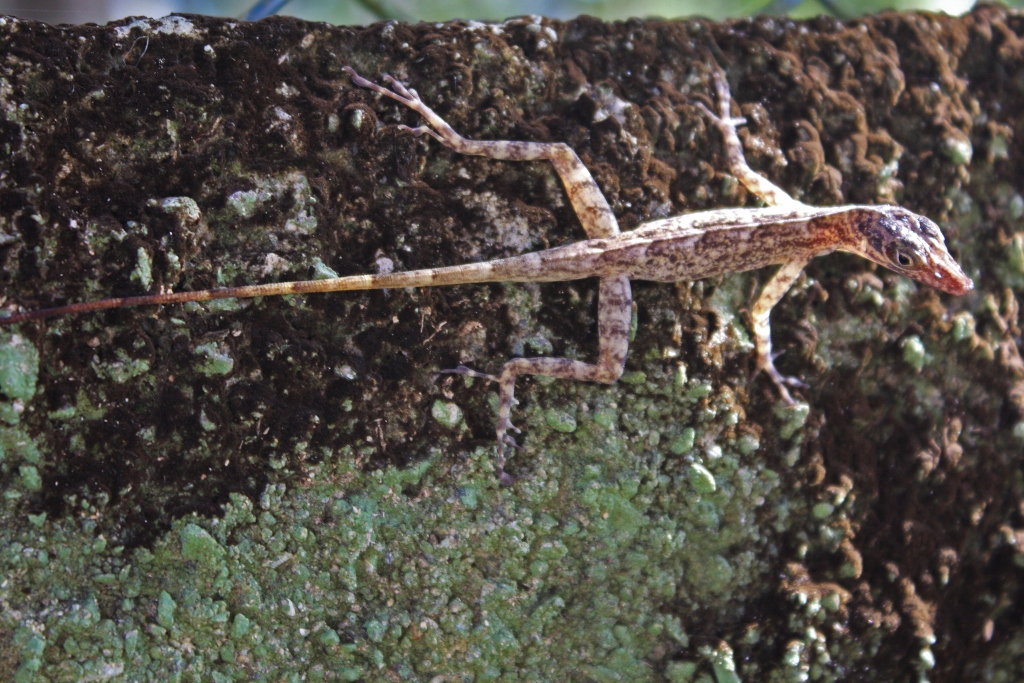

Conservation status
- Least Concern (IUCN 3.1)

Scientific classification
- Kingdom: Animalia
- Phylum: Chordata
- Class: Reptilia
- Order: Squamata
- Suborder: Iguania
- Family: Dactyloidae
- Genus: Anolis
- Species: A. argenteolus

Binomial name
- Anolis argenteolus Cope, 1861

= Anolis argenteolus =

Species of lizard

Anolis argenteolus, the Cuban trunk anole or Guantanamo anole, is a species of lizard in the family Dactyloidae. The species is found in Cuba.
