= Anolis quadriocellifer =

Scientific classification
- Kingdom: Animalia
- Phylum: Chordata
- Class: Reptilia
- Order: Squamata
- Suborder: Iguania
- Family: Dactyloidae
- Genus: Anolis
- Species: A. quadriocellifer

Binomial name
- Anolis quadriocellifer Barbour & Ramsden, 1919

Species of lizard

Anolis quadriocellifer, the Cuban eyespot anole or peninsula anole, is a species of lizard in the family Dactyloidae. The species is found in Cuba.
