= Arrhyton taeniatum =

Conservation status
- Least Concern (IUCN 3.1)

Scientific classification
- Kingdom: Animalia
- Phylum: Chordata
- Class: Reptilia
- Order: Squamata
- Suborder: Serpentes
- Family: Colubridae
- Genus: Arrhyton
- Species: A. taeniatum

Binomial name
- Arrhyton taeniatum (Günther, 1858)

Species of snake

Arrhyton taeniatum, the broad-striped racerlet or Günther's Island racer, is a species of snake in the family Colubridae. It is found in Cuba.
