= Eleutherodactylus blairhedgesi =

Conservation status
- Critically Endangered (IUCN 3.1)

Scientific classification
- Kingdom: Animalia
- Phylum: Chordata
- Class: Amphibia
- Order: Anura
- Clade: Brachycephaloidea
- Family: Eleutherodactylidae
- Genus: Eleutherodactylus
- Species: E. blairhedgesi

Binomial name
- Eleutherodactylus blairhedgesi Estrada, Diaz & Rodriguez, 1997

Species of amphibian

Eleutherodactylus blairhedgesi is a species of frog in the family Eleutherodactylidae endemic to Cuba. It is only known from the area near its type locality, Santa Cruz del Norte in the Mayabeque Province. However, within its restricted range, it is common. It is found on limestone rocks and cliffs in coastal open areas. It is threatened by potential habitat loss associated with touristic development and oil extraction.
