= Anolis ophiolepis =

Conservation status
- Least Concern (IUCN 3.1)

Scientific classification
- Kingdom: Animalia
- Phylum: Chordata
- Class: Reptilia
- Order: Squamata
- Suborder: Iguania
- Family: Dactyloidae
- Genus: Anolis
- Species: A. ophiolepis

Binomial name
- Anolis ophiolepis Cope, 1861

Species of lizard

Anolis ophiolepis, the five-striped grass anole or snakescale anole, is a species of lizard in the family Dactyloidae. The species is found on Isla de la Juventud in Cuba.
