= Anolis cupeyalensis =

Conservation status
- Least Concern (IUCN 3.1)

Scientific classification
- Kingdom: Animalia
- Phylum: Chordata
- Class: Reptilia
- Order: Squamata
- Suborder: Iguania
- Family: Dactyloidae
- Genus: Anolis
- Species: A. cupeyalensis

Binomial name
- Anolis cupeyalensis Peters, 1970

Species of lizard

Anolis cupeyalensis, the stripe-bellied grass anole or Cupeyal anole, is a species of lizard in the family Dactyloidae. The species is found in Cuba.
