= Arrhyton vittatum =

Conservation status
- Least Concern (IUCN 3.1)

Scientific classification
- Kingdom: Animalia
- Phylum: Chordata
- Class: Reptilia
- Order: Squamata
- Suborder: Serpentes
- Family: Colubridae
- Genus: Arrhyton
- Species: A. vittatum

Binomial name
- Arrhyton vittatum (Gundlach, 1861)

Species of snake

Arrhyton vittatum, the Cuban short-tailed racerlet or common island racer, is a species of snake in the family Colubridae. It is found in Cuba.
