= Arrhyton redimitum =

Conservation status
- Least Concern (IUCN 3.1)

Scientific classification
- Kingdom: Animalia
- Phylum: Chordata
- Class: Reptilia
- Order: Squamata
- Suborder: Serpentes
- Family: Colubridae
- Genus: Arrhyton
- Species: A. redimitum

Binomial name
- Arrhyton redimitum (Cope, 1862)

Synonyms
- Arrhyton landoi A. Schwartz, 1965; Arrhyton vittatum landoi A. Schwartz, 1965; Colorhogia redimita Cope, 1862

Species of snake

Arrhyton redimitum, also known commonly as the Oriente brown-capped racerlet, is a species of snake in the subfamily Dipsadinae of the family Colubridae. The species is endemic to Cuba.

== Geographic range ==
A. redimitum is found in extreme southeastern Cuba.

== Habitat ==
The preferred natural habitats of A. redimitum are forest and shrubland, but it has also been found in coffee plantations.

== Reproduction ==
A. redimitum is oviparous.
