= Anolis spectrum =

Conservation status
- Vulnerable (IUCN 3.1)

Scientific classification
- Kingdom: Animalia
- Phylum: Chordata
- Class: Reptilia
- Order: Squamata
- Suborder: Iguania
- Family: Anolidae
- Genus: Anolis
- Species: A. spectrum

Binomial name
- Anolis spectrum Peters, 1863

Species of lizard

Anolis spectrum, the black-shouldered ground anole, Matanzas anole, or ghost anole, is a species of lizard in the family Dactyloidae. The species is found in Cuba.
