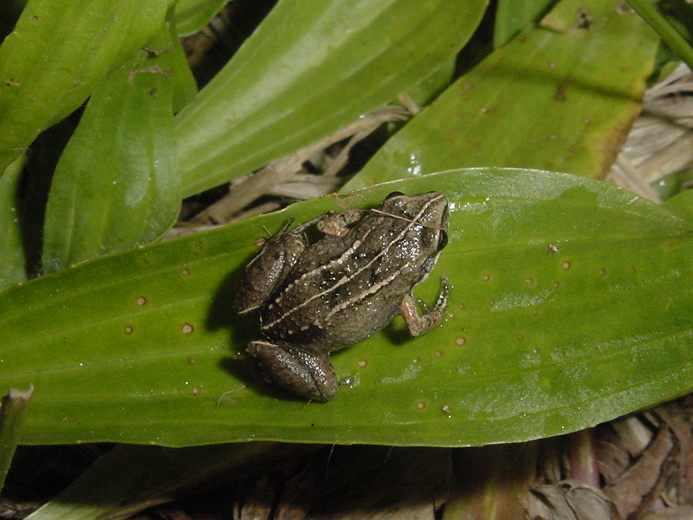

Conservation status
- Least Concern (IUCN 3.1)

Scientific classification
- Kingdom: Animalia
- Phylum: Chordata
- Class: Amphibia
- Order: Anura
- Clade: Brachycephaloidea
- Family: Eleutherodactylidae
- Genus: Eleutherodactylus
- Species: E. varleyi

Binomial name
- Eleutherodactylus varleyi Dunn, 1925

Synonyms
- Eleutherodactylus phyzelus Schwartz, 1958

= Eleutherodactylus varleyi =

Species of amphibian

Eleutherodactylus varleyi is a species of frog in the family Eleutherodactylidae endemic to Cuba. Its natural habitats are subtropical or tropical moist lowland forest, subtropical or tropical seasonally wet or flooded lowland grassland, arable land, pastureland, plantations, rural gardens, urban areas, and heavily degraded former forest.
