= Juventud least gecko =

Conservation status
- Endangered (IUCN 3.1)

Scientific classification
- Kingdom: Animalia
- Phylum: Chordata
- Class: Reptilia
- Order: Squamata
- Suborder: Gekkota
- Family: Sphaerodactylidae
- Genus: Sphaerodactylus
- Species: S. oliveri

Binomial name
- Sphaerodactylus oliveri Grant, 1944

Species of lizard

The Juventud least gecko (Sphaerodactylus oliveri) is a species of lizard in the family Sphaerodactylidae. The species is endemic to the West Indies.

== Etymology ==
The specific name, oliveri, is in honor of American herpetologist James Arthur Oliver.

== Geographic range ==
Sphaerodactylus oliveri is found in Cuba and the Bahamas.

== Habitat ==
The preferred habitat of Sphaerodactylus oliveri is forest at altitudes of 0–600 m (0–1,969 ft).

== Reproduction ==
Sphaerodactylus oliveri is oviparous.
