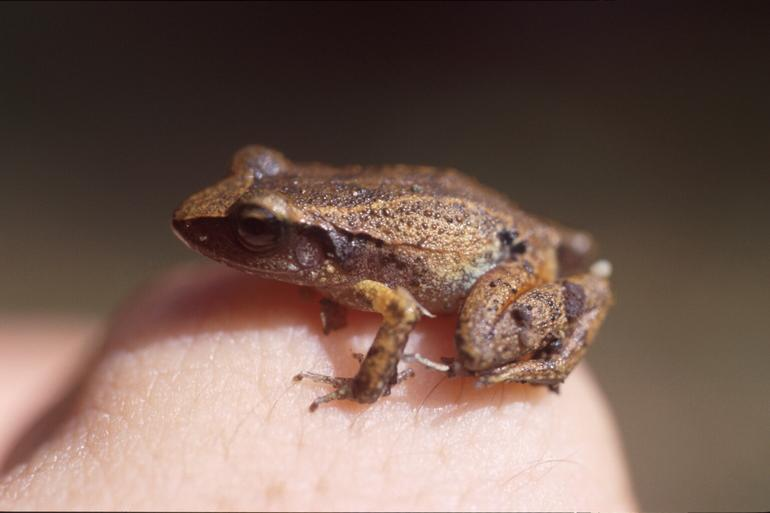

Conservation status
- Least Concern (IUCN 3.1)

Scientific classification
- Kingdom: Animalia
- Phylum: Chordata
- Class: Amphibia
- Order: Anura
- Clade: Brachycephaloidea
- Family: Eleutherodactylidae
- Genus: Eleutherodactylus
- Species: E. atkinsi

Binomial name
- Eleutherodactylus atkinsi Dunn, 1925

= Eleutherodactylus atkinsi =

Species of amphibian

Eleutherodactylus atkinsi is a species of frog in the family Eleutherodactylidae endemic to Cuba. Its natural habitats are dry forests, moist forests, moist shrubland, flooded grasslands and savannas, swamps, caves, arable land, pastures, plantations, rural gardens, urban areas, heavily degraded former forests, irrigated land, seasonally flooded agricultural land, and canals and ditches.
