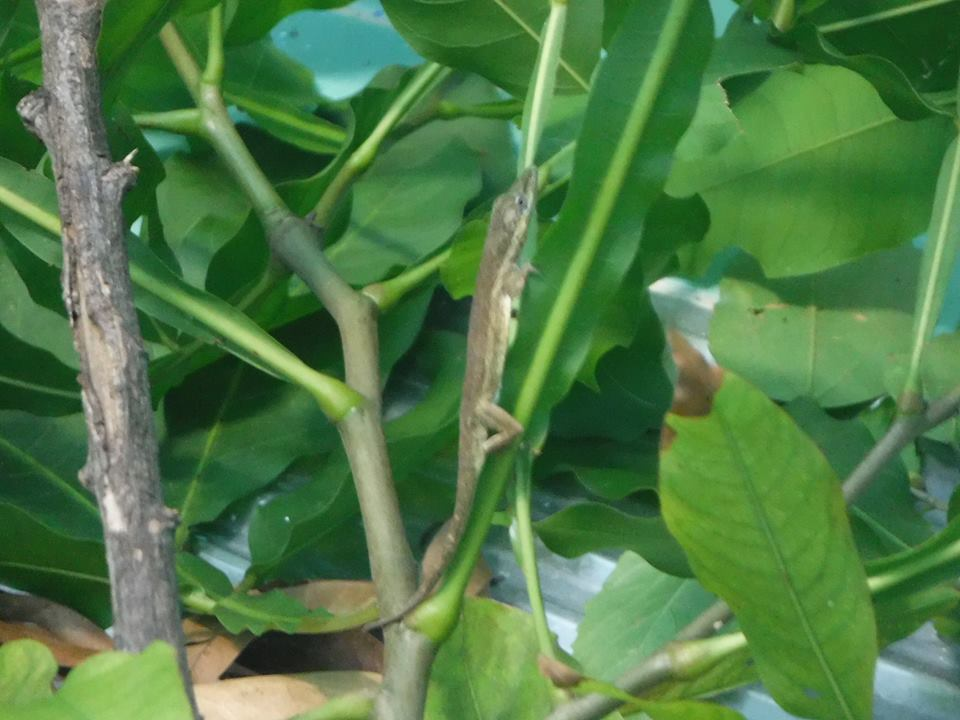

Conservation status
- Least Concern (IUCN 3.1)

Scientific classification
- Kingdom: Animalia
- Phylum: Chordata
- Class: Reptilia
- Order: Squamata
- Suborder: Iguania
- Family: Dactyloidae
- Genus: Anolis
- Species: A. angusticeps

Binomial name
- Anolis angusticeps Hallowell, 1856

= Anolis angusticeps =

Species of lizard

Anolis angusticeps, the Cuban twig anole, is an arboreal lizard found in Cuba.
