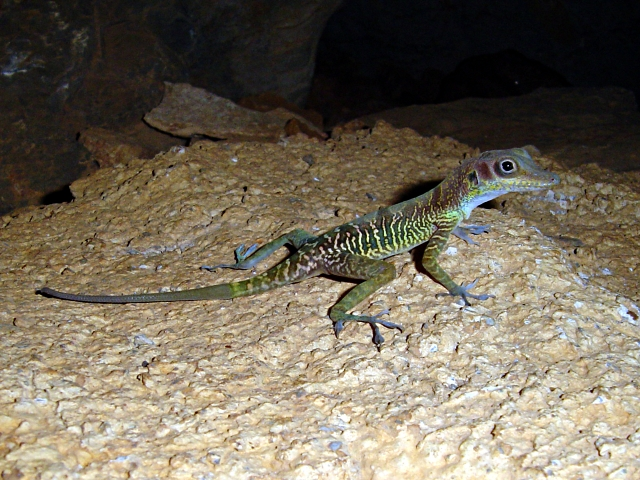

Conservation status
- Least Concern (IUCN 3.1)

Scientific classification
- Kingdom: Animalia
- Phylum: Chordata
- Class: Reptilia
- Order: Squamata
- Suborder: Iguania
- Family: Dactyloidae
- Genus: Anolis
- Species: A. bartschi

Binomial name
- Anolis bartschi (Cochran, 1928)

Synonyms
- Deiroptyx bartschi Cochran, 1928; Anolis bartschi — Etheridge, 1960

= Anolis bartschi =

West Cuban anole

Species of lizard

Anolis bartschi, also known commonly as the Pinar Del Rio cliff anole, the western cliff anole, and the west Cuban anole, is a species of lizard in the family Dactyloidae. The species is endemic to Cuba.

== Description ==
Anolis bartschi is a medium-sized anole. Adult males have a typical snout-to-vent length of 7.5 cm (3.0 in) and females 6.4 cm (2.5 in). It is one of only two anoles that completely lack a dewlap (both sexes), the other being the Cuban stream anole (A. vermiculatus).

== Geographic range ==
A. bartschi is native to western Cuba (Pinar del Río Province).

== Habitat ==
The preferred natural habitat of A. bartschi is forest in limestone karst areas.

== Reproduction ==
A. bartschi is oviparous. It is among the relatively few anole species in which females may lay their eggs together, forming a communal nest in cavities in a steep cliff.

== Etymology ==
The specific name, bartschi, is in honor of zoologist Paul Bartsch, who collected the holotype.

== See also ==
- List of Anolis lizards
