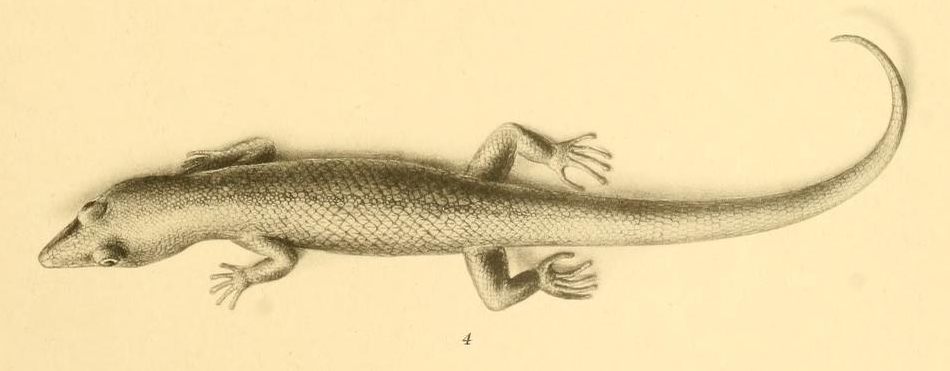

Conservation status
- Least Concern (IUCN 3.1)

Scientific classification
- Kingdom: Animalia
- Phylum: Chordata
- Class: Reptilia
- Order: Squamata
- Suborder: Gekkota
- Family: Sphaerodactylidae
- Genus: Sphaerodactylus
- Species: S. scaber

Binomial name
- Sphaerodactylus scaber Barbour & Ramsden, 1919

= Sphaerodactylus scaber =

Species of lizard

Sphaerodactylus scaber, also known as the double-collared sphaero or Camaguey least gecko, is a small species of gecko endemic to Cuba.
