= Alberto R. Estrada =

Alberto Rafael Estrada Acosta
- Born: September 3, 1953 (age 73); Havana, Cuba
- Education: University of Havana
- Known for: Research on Cuban amphibians, reptiles, birds, and mammals
- Scientific career
- Fields: Biology, herpetology, ecology, ornithology

Alberto Rafael Estrada Acosta (born 3 September 1953 in Havana) is a Cuban biologist. His interests include zoology, ecology, and wildlife management, particularly the herpetofauna, avifauna, and bioacoustics of frogs.

== Biography ==
Estrada was born in Havana, Cuba, in 1953. He studied biology at the University of Havana, graduating in 1981 with a degree in Biological Sciences specializing in vertebrate zoology. He subsequently worked as a zoologist and researcher in Cuba before emigrating to the United States in 1997 and settling in Puerto Rico.

From 1997 to 2015, Estrada lived and worked in Puerto Rico. He worked as an adjunct professor at Universidad Metropolitana in San Juan and as a science teacher at Academia María Reina. A 2004 peer-reviewed paper lists him as a member of the Department of Science, Technology and Health at Universidad Metropolitana in San Juan.

Estrada's research has focused on amphibians, reptiles, birds, and mammals, particularly Cuban fauna. During his years as an active researcher in Cuba between 1981 and 1997, he conducted numerous field expeditions and accumulated extensive field notes on terrestrial vertebrates. His publications include taxonomic and ecological studies of Cuban amphibians and reptiles, including work on the genera Eleutherodactylus and Anolis.

Estrada has published more than fifty articles in peer-reviewed journals on the biology of amphibians, reptiles, birds, and mammals of Cuba. His research has appeared in journals and publications from Cuba, the United States, Europe, and Latin America.

Estrada has also participated in research and conservation work involving marine mammals in Puerto Rico. During his years there, he collaborated with the Caribbean Marine Mammal Laboratory and was involved with the Caribbean Stranding Network.

== Eponyms ==
In 1991, John Douglas Lynch named the subspecies Eleutherodactylus atkinsi estradai after Estrada. His name also appears in the English common name of Estrada's robber frog (Eleutherodactylus melacara Hedges, Estrada & Thomas, 1992).
