= Stephen Blair Hedges =

Professor of evolutionary biology

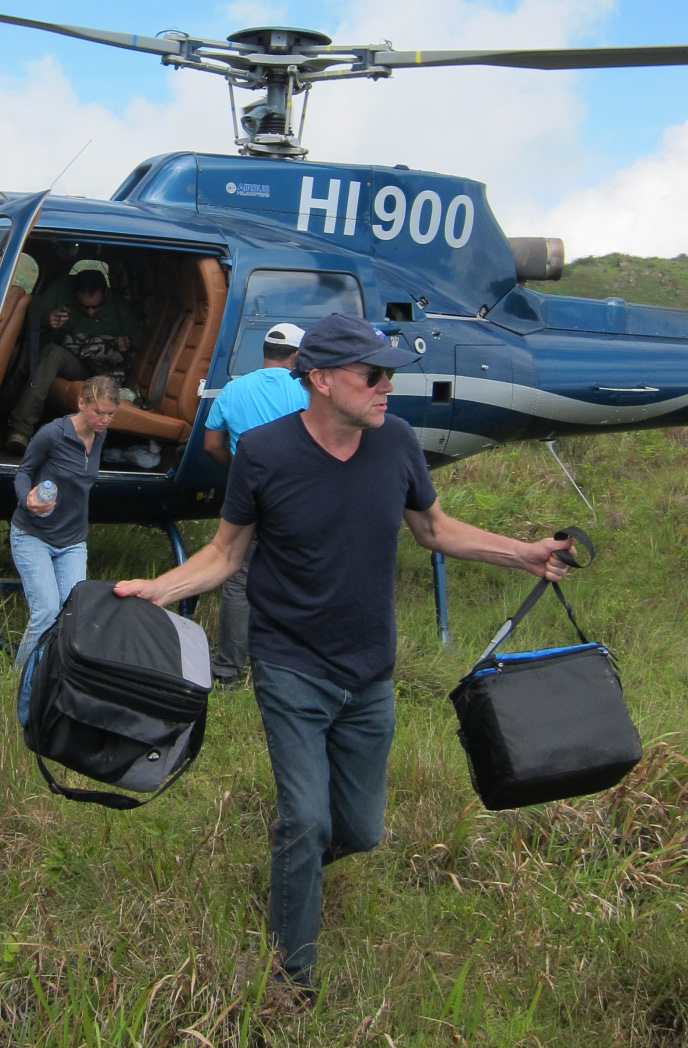
Blair Hedges

Stephen Blair Hedges (known as S. Blair Hedges) is Laura H. Carnell Professor of Science and director of the Center for Biodiversity at Temple University where he researches the tree of life and leads conservation efforts in Haiti and elsewhere. He co-founded Haiti National Trust.

== Career ==
Hedges has a Bachelor of Science undergraduate degree from George Mason University, and a Masters and PhD in Zoology from the University of Maryland, supervised by Richard Highton. Before he joined Temple University in 2014, he was a professor at Penn State. He is also a founding member of the NASA Astrobiology Center. He has published over 300 peer-reviewed works including 10 books and monographs. He was elected as a fellow of the American Association for the Advancement of Science in 2009 for "revealing connections between biological evolution and Earth history in diverse groups of organisms", and was awarded the 2011 Penn State Faculty Scholar Medal for Outstanding Achievement in the Life and Health Sciences. A Cuban butterfly (Leptodes hedgesi Schwartz & Johnson 1992), Cuban frog (Eleutherodactylus blairhedgesi Estrada, Diaz, & Rodriguez 1997), and Cuban millipede (Amphelictogon blairi Perez-Asso 1998) have been named in his honor.

=== Research ===
Hedges has studied the relationships and timing of major groups in the tree of life using genomic data. This research has led to a number of discoveries including an early origin for the orders of placental mammals and modern birds, estimates of when prokaryotes and eukaryotes first colonized land and its relevance for the planet, and the phylogenetic relationships of reptiles and insectivorous mammals. He has coined the word timetree for a phylogenetic tree scaled to time, co-founded the TimeTree database for exploring the time-scale of the tree of life, and co-edited the book Timetree of Life. Hedges and his team produced a spiral tree of life in 2015 to visualize the relationships over time of 50,000 species, and discovered that diversification and speciation are both relatively constant through time and among groups.

Hedges also has a field program in the Caribbean where he has studied the evolution and biogeography of amphibians and reptiles with genetic data and maintained a database of information on these species, Caribherp. He discovered many new species in his work and has so far named 135 species of reptiles, amphibians, and butterflies. He also described three of the smallest species of reptiles and amphibians, including the Monte Iberia dwarf frog (Eleutherodactylus iberia), Jaragua gecko (Sphaerodactylus ariasae), and the Barbados threadsnake (Tetracheilostoma carlae). Twelve articles in the New York Times have described his research.

=== Conservation ===
Work by Hedges and his team in Haiti has defined hot spots of biodiversity leading to the establishment of three national parks in Haiti. He also initiated a captive breeding program to conserve ten endangered species of frog at the Philadelphia Zoo. Together with Haitian CEO Philippe Bayard, he founded Haiti National Trust, an environmental protection NGO.

== Personal life ==
Hedges is interested in Renaissance art, which led him to conduct several scientific studies of early artwork, including the development of a method for dating old prints and a study on the historical biogeography of beetles based on the holes they bored in old books.
