= Orlando H. Garrido =

Cuban zoologist and tennis player

Orlando Garrido
- Full name: Orlando H. Garrido
- Country (sports): Cuba
- Born: 1 March 1931
- Died: 24 June 2024 (aged 93)
- Height: 5 ft 11 in (180 cm)

Singles

Grand Slam singles results
- Wimbledon: 1R (1956, 57, 58, 59, 61)
- US Open: 1R (1959)

Orlando H. Garrido (1 March 1931 – 24 June 2024) was a Cuban biologist and tennis player.

== Life and career ==
A native of Havana, Garrido was born on 1 March 1931. He was a University of Miami collegiate player, and represented Cuba in the Davis Cup from 1950 to 1959. He featured in the singles main draw at Wimbledon five times and in 1956 made the fourth round in mixed doubles. In 1959 he was beaten by his brother Reynaldo in the singles final of the Canadian championships.

Garrido, a renowned naturalist, is credited with the description of over 100 birds, insect taxa and reptiles.

Two species of Cuban lizards are named in his honor: Anolis garridoi and Diploglossus garridoi.

Garrido died on 24 June 2024, at the age of 93.

== See also ==
- List of Cuba Davis Cup team representatives
