= Anolis juangundlachi =

Conservation status
- Critically Endangered (IUCN 3.1)

Scientific classification
- Kingdom: Animalia
- Phylum: Chordata
- Class: Reptilia
- Order: Squamata
- Suborder: Iguania
- Family: Dactyloidae
- Genus: Anolis
- Species: A. juangundlachi

Binomial name
- Anolis juangundlachi Garrido, 1975

Species of lizard

Anolis juangundlachi, also known commonly as the Finca Ceres anole and the yellow-lipped grass anole, is a species of lizard belonging to the family Dactyloidae. The species is endemic to Cuba.

== Etymology ==
The specific name, juangundlachi, is in honor of German-Cuban zoologist Juan Gundlach.

== Geographic range ==
A. juangundlachi is found in Matanzas Province, Cuba.

== Habitat ==
The preferred natural habitat of A. juangundlachi is grassland.

== Description ==
Small for its genus, A. juangundlachi may attain a snout-to-vent length (SVL) of 36 mm (1.4 in) in males and 31 mm (1.2 in) in females. It is chestnut brown dorsally, and yellow ventrally. The iris of the eye is blue. The dewlap is pale yellow in males and absent in females.

== Reproduction ==
A. juangundlachi is oviparous.

== Taxonomy ==
A. gundlachi is a member of the Anolis alutaceus species group.
