= Juan Gundlach =

Cuban naturalist and taxonomist

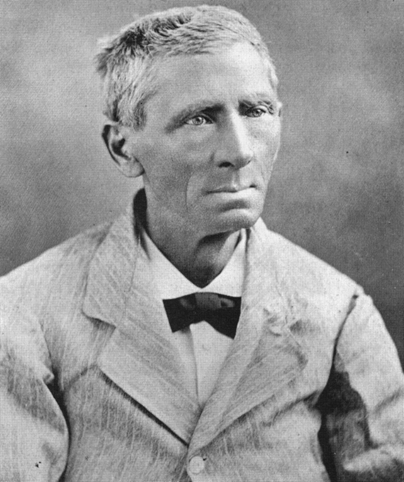
- Born: Johannes Christoph Gundlach; July 17, 1810; Marburg, Kingdom of Westphalia
- Died: March 14, 1896 (aged 85); Havana, Captaincy General of Cuba
- Occupations: Taxonomist, naturalist
- Years active: 1839 - 1896
- Known for: Describing several new species of Cuban and Puerto Rican fauna

Juan Cristóbal Gundlach born Johann Christoph Gundlach (July 17, 1810 - March 14, 1896) was a German-Cuban naturalist and taxonomist. He moved to Cuba after completing his doctorate with the aim of collecting natural history specimens across taxa, including fish, reptiles, amphibians, birds, and insects. A number of species were described from these collections, several named after him.

== Biography ==
Gundlach was born in Marburg where his father was a professor of physics. His father died young and he then followed his mother's suggestion to study theology. He however quit studies and joined the university museum and shifted to study zoology, thanks to Maurice Herold, with a tuition waiver on account of his being the son of a faculty member. He had had an interest in animals even at a young age. He helped his brother in taxidermy and preservation of biology specimens. An early accident with a gun injured his nose and he lost his sense of smell and taste. He graduated from Marburg University and received a master of arts in 1837 and Doctor of Philosophy in 1838. In 1838 he planned a visit to Surinam, where he had a Dutch army physician friend Jules Hille (1812-1849), with travel support from the Verein für Naturwissenschaften Kassel. Its second director Robert Wilhelm Bunsen (1811–1899) raised shares worth 1218 thaler from 105 subscribers. He was to send back natural history specimens in return in repayment. In 1839, he left Europe to visit Surinam but was he finished most of his collections by the time he reached the Caribbean island of Cuba. The specimens he collected on his first expedition were sold by Eduard Sezekorn (1796–1869) to cover the money raised. His friend in Surinam had died in the meantime. He then lived in Cuba with help from the local landowners. He established a local museum in 1846 near Cárdenas on a farm called El Refugio. The collections he set up attracted a large number of visitors. He made collecting trips, sending specimens to Europe from there. In 1864 he moved this museum to the sugar farm of the Simón de Cárdenas family. During a short trip to Puerto Rico, at the request of Jesuit fathers to offer assistance in the creation of a zoological collection in 1868, when revolutionary activities were beginning in Cuba as well as Puerto Rico, he met with don Tomás Blanco y González (1840–1892), according to naturalist Dr. Agustín Stahl. In 1867 his collections were exhibited in Paris at the Exposition Universelle and he received a silver medal. A friend of Carl Wilhelm Leopold Krug, who served as German Vice Consul in Mayagüez, Puerto Rico and who paid for some of Gundlach's travels, he visited Puerto Rico in 1873, leaving Havana on 4 June 1873 on the ship Manuela, arriving in Mayagüez on 13 June and staying in Puerto Rico for approximately six months. During that trip, Gundlach contributed to the founding of the Civil Institute for Secondary Learning or "Instituto Civil de Segunda Enseñanza". This institute was closed several months later, in keeping with the Spanish government's policy expressed to the bishops of Santiago de Cuba and of San Juan of limiting the opportunities for higher learning on both islands. He subsequently travelled from Havana to Puerto Rico's west coast aboard the "Marsella" in September 1875. He remained in Puerto Rico for approximately one year; while he was there, he changed his name from Johannes Christoph to its Spanish equivalent, Juan Cristóbal. He wrote Contribucion á la Erpetologia Cubana (1880) and Contribucion á la entomologia Cubana in 4 volumes (1881–1884). He also wrote the first major work on the birds of Cuba, Ornitología Cubana, and his name is commemorated in the scientific names of over sixty species. His hosts went into financial distress and in 1892, he sold off his collections to the Instituto de Segunda Enseñanza de la Habana and paid the proceeds to the Cárdenas family. This also allowed a small salary with which he lived alone until his death. His collections passed into the care of the Museo Poey in Havana, named after Cuban intellectual Dr. Felipe Poey y Aloy (1799–1891), upon his death in 1896.

== Legacy ==
In 1986, on the 90th anniversary of his death, Cuba issued a series of postal stamps commemorating Gundlach.

His visits to Puerto Rico were considered so important to the development of the study of natural sciences in Puerto Rico that he is considered "the Father of Natural Sciences in Puerto Rico" and his portrait, painted by Andrés Garcés, hangs in the School of Natural Sciences at the University of Puerto Rico, Río Piedras campus. To honor him, Dr. Agustín Stahl named a species of cupey tree in his honor as Clusia gundlachi. The Puerto Rico Academy of Arts and Sciences on June 26, 2008, awarded recognitions that carry Gundlach's name to 25 prominent scientists in Puerto Rico.

=== Eponymous taxa ===
- Accipiter gundlachii – Gundlach's hawk
- Acmaeodera gundlachi – a buprestid beetle
- Anolis gundlachi – a Puerto Rican lizard
- Anolis juangundlachi – a Cuban lizard
- Buteogallus gundlachii - Cuban black hawk
- Calisto gundlachi - endemic butterfly of Cuba
- Camponotus gundlachi – a Cuban carpenter ant
- Capromys pilorides gundlachianus - subspecies of Cuban hutia
- Cazierus gundlachii – a Cuban scorpion
- Chiomara gundlachi – butterfly of the family Hesperiidae
- Chlaenius gundlachi - a beetle
- Chordeiles gundlachii – Antillean nighthawk
- Clusia gundlachi – a vine endemic to Puerto Rico
- Coccothrinax gundlachii - endemic Cuban palm
- Colaptes auratus gundlachi - subspecies of northern flicker from Grand Cayman
- Compsodrillia gundlachi - Caribbean sea snail
- Eleutherodactylus gundlachi – Gundlach's robber frog
- Gundlachia – a genus of land snails
- Gundlachia – a genus of plants
- Guppya gundlachi - a land snail
- Lasioglossum (Dialictus) gundlachii – a halictid bee
- Mimus gundlachii - Bahama mockingbird
- Mysateles prehensilis gundlachi - subspecies of prehensile-tailed hutia in Cuba
- Nephronaias gundlachii – a land snail
- Neolema gundlachiana – a leaf beetle
- Palinurellus gundlachi – Caribbean furry lobster
- Parides gundlachianus – Cuban cattleheart, butterfly of the family Papilionidae
- Peltophryne gundlachi – Gundlach's Caribbean toad
- Setophaga petechia gundlachi – subspecies of yellow warbler (petechia group)
- Strumigenys gundlachi – a Neotropical dacetine ant
- Strymon bazochii gundlachianus – Cuban subspecies of Strymon bazochii
- Temnothorax gundlachi – a Cuban ant
- Tolumnia gundlachii - a Caribbean orchid
- Unio gundlachi – a freshwater bivalve
- Vireo gundlachii – Cuban vireo
- Xylophanes gundlachii - Cuban moth (Sphingidae)

== See also ==
- Category:Taxa named by Juan Gundlach

== Bibliography ==
- Complete bibliography at WorldCat
