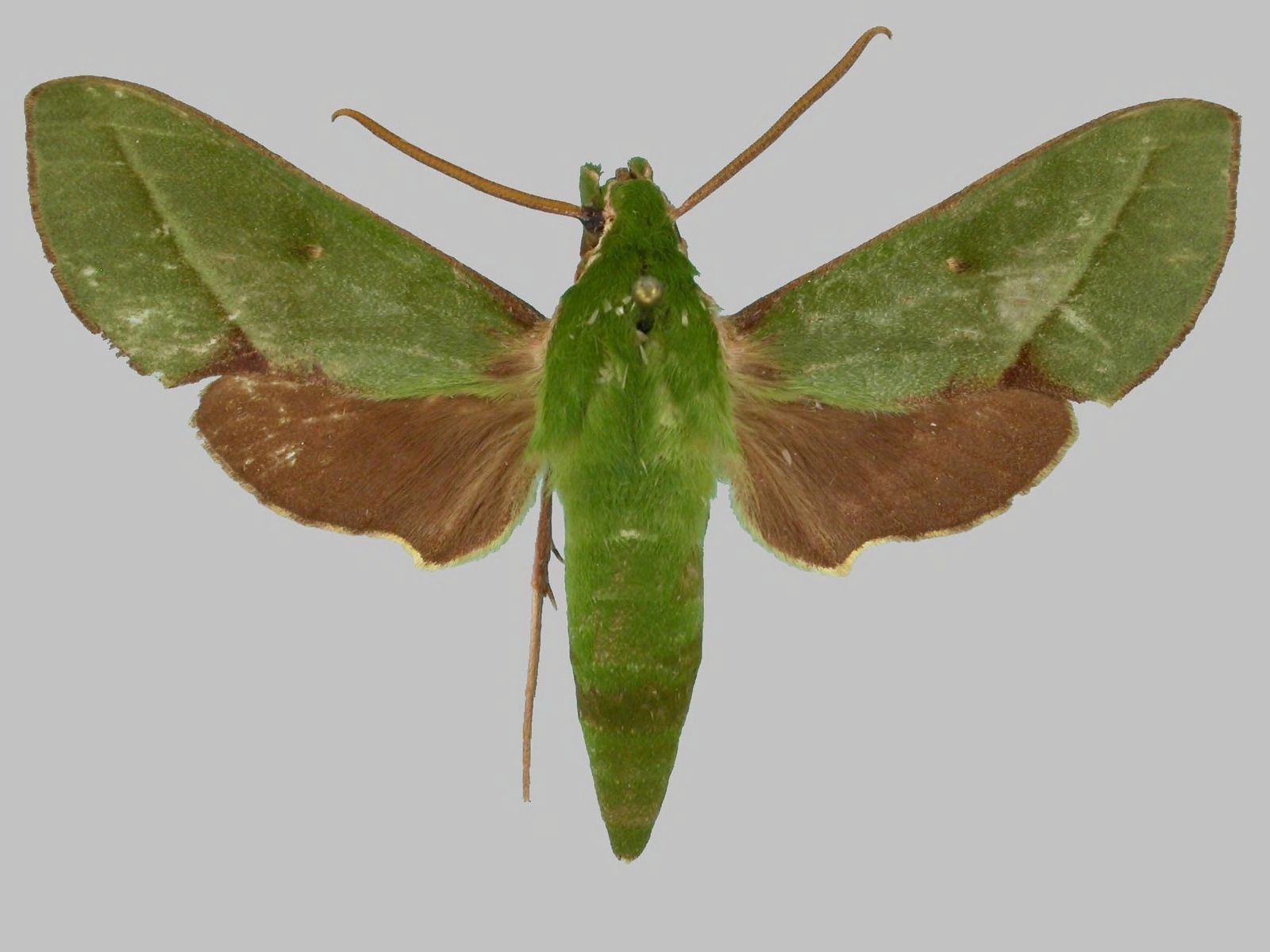

Scientific classification
- Kingdom: Animalia
- Phylum: Arthropoda
- Class: Insecta
- Order: Lepidoptera
- Family: Sphingidae
- Genus: Xylophanes
- Species: X. gundlachii

Binomial name
- Xylophanes gundlachii (Herrich-Schaffer, 1863)

Synonyms
- Chaerocampa gundlachii Herrich-Schäffer, 1863

= Xylophanes gundlachii =

Species of moth

Xylophanes gundlachii is a moth of the family Sphingidae. It is known from Cuba. The specific epithet is named after Cuban naturalist Juan Gundlach.

== Diet ==
The larvae probably feed on Rubiaceae and Malvaceae species.
