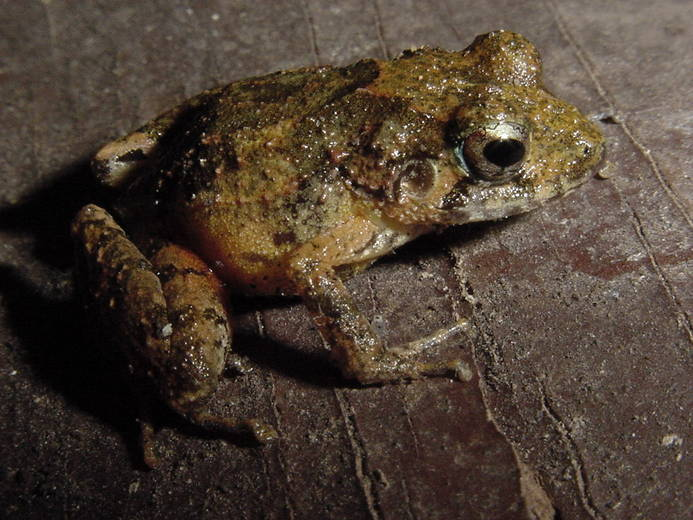

Conservation status
- Endangered (IUCN 3.1)

Scientific classification
- Kingdom: Animalia
- Phylum: Chordata
- Class: Amphibia
- Order: Anura
- Family: Eleutherodactylidae
- Genus: Eleutherodactylus
- Subgenus: Euhyas
- Species: E. gundlachi

Binomial name
- Eleutherodactylus gundlachi Schmidt, 1920

Synonyms
- Eleutherodactylus plicatus Barbour, 1914 – preoccupied by Hylodes plicatus Günther, 1900; Hylodes barbouri Nieden, 1923 – replacement name; Euhyas gundlachi (Schmidt, 1920)

= Eleutherodactylus gundlachi =

Species of amphibian

Eleutherodactylus gundlachi is a species of frog in the family Eleutherodactylidae. It is endemic to southeastern Cuba. The specific name gundlachi honors Johannes Christoph Gundlach, a German zoologist. Common names Turquino spiny frog and Gundlach's robber frog have been coined for it.

== Description ==
Adults can grow to 25 mm (1.0 in) in snout–vent length. The head is as wide as the body or narrower. Dorsal skin has many granules and tubercles. There is a conspicuous W-shaped suprascapular fold. The finger and toe discs are small. Coloration is dark brown or greenish brown, either relatively uniform or with irregular spots. Clear dorsolateral stripes or two rounded spots on the middle of the back are present in some individuals. The belly can be whitish, pinkish, or yellowish. The throat is white or with brown reticulation. The limbs have dark bands.

== Habitat and conservation ==
Eleutherodactylus gundlachi occurs closed mesic forests at elevations of 650–1,375 m (2,133–4,511 ft) or 200–1,970 m (660–6,460 ft) above sea level. It is a terrestrial species; males call from the ground. Development is direct, without free-living larval stage. It is a common species in suitable habitat, but its range is restricted. It is threatened by habitat loss caused by agriculture, woodcutting, disturbance from tourist activities, and infrastructure development. It occurs in a number of protected areas, but many of these are not well managed for conservation.
