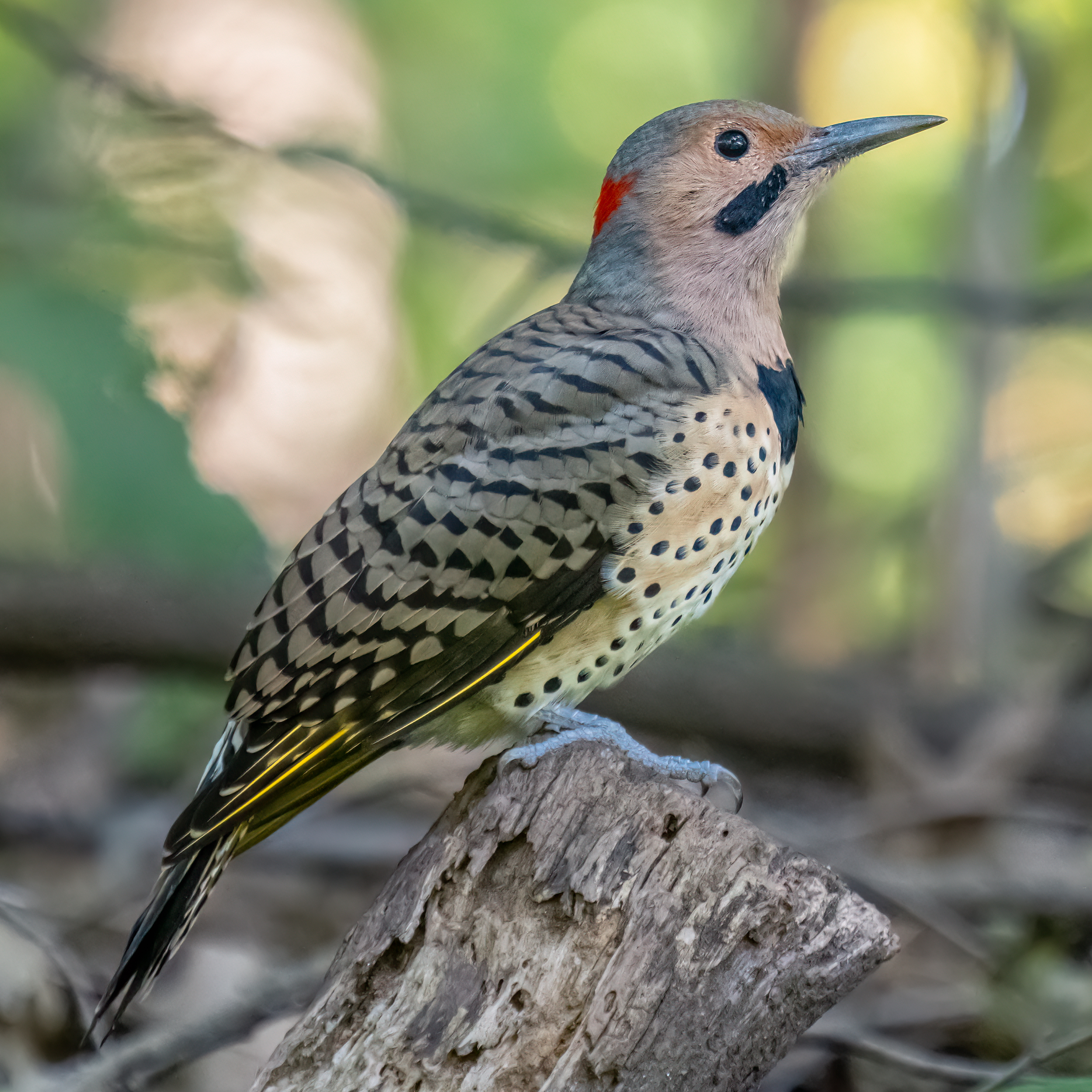
- Male yellow-shafted C. a. luteus
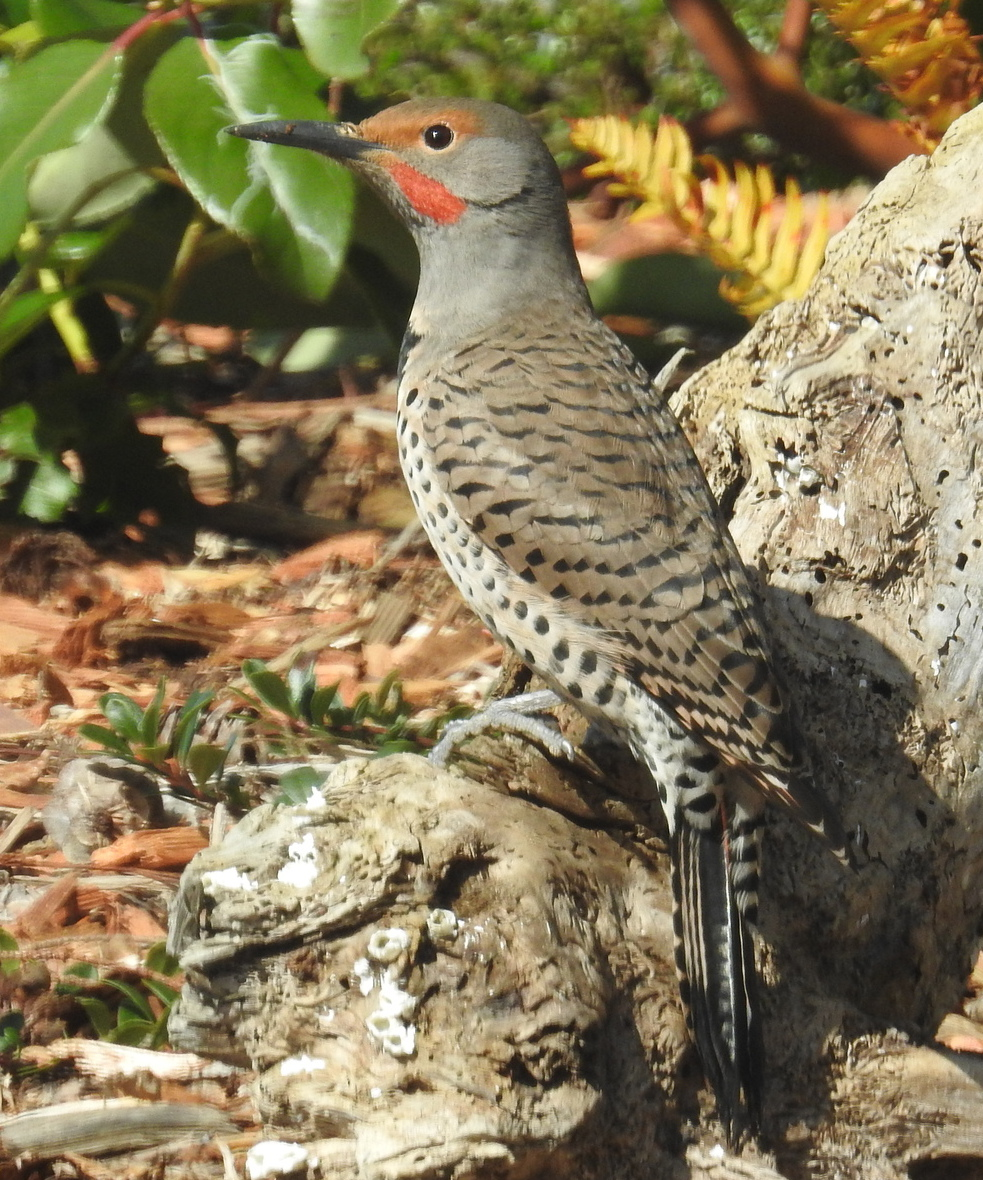
- Male red-shafted C. a cafer

Conservation status
- Least Concern (IUCN 3.1)

Scientific classification
- Kingdom: Animalia
- Phylum: Chordata
- Class: Aves
- Order: Piciformes
- Family: Picidae
- Genus: Colaptes
- Species: C. auratus

Binomial name
- Colaptes auratus (Linnaeus, 1758)
- Approximate distribution of the species (top), the red-shafted group (left), and the yellow-shafted group (right). Breeding Year-round Nonbreeding

Synonyms
- Cuculus auratus Linnaeus, 1758; Picus auratus Linnaeus, 1766

= Northern flicker =

Member of the woodpecker family

The northern flicker or common flicker (Colaptes auratus) is a medium-sized bird of the woodpecker family. It is native to most of North America, parts of Central America, Cuba, and the Cayman Islands, and is one of the few woodpecker species that migrate. Over 100 common names for the northern flicker are known, including yellowhammer (not to be confused with the Eurasian yellowhammer (Emberiza citrinella)), clape, gaffer woodpecker, harry-wicket, heigh-ho, wake-up, walk-up, wick-up, yarrup, and gawker bird. Many of these names derive from attempts to imitate some of its calls.

== Taxonomy ==
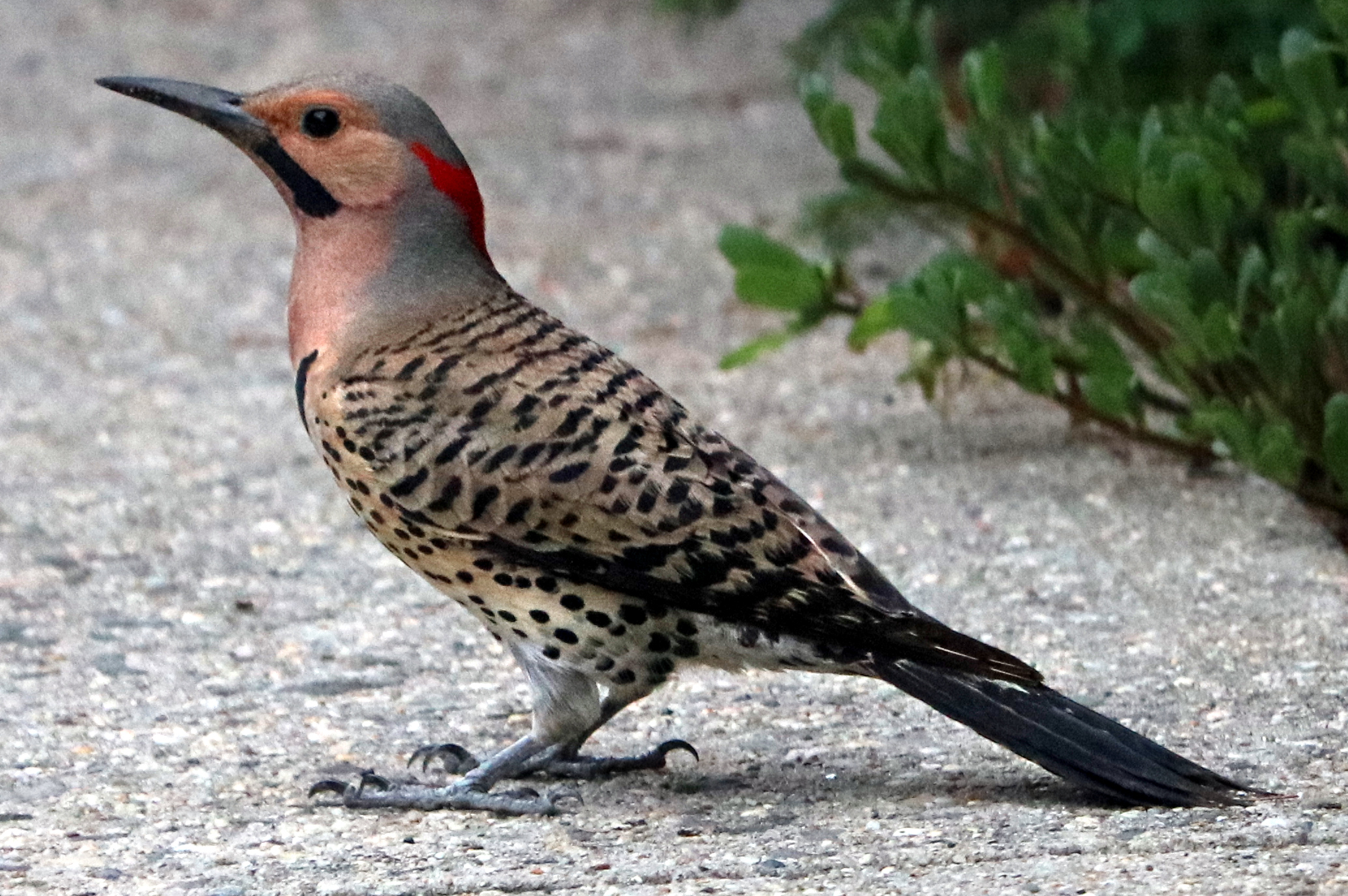
Yellow-shafted male on Long Island

The English naturalist Mark Catesby described and illustrated the northern flicker in his book The Natural History of Carolina, Florida and the Bahama Islands which was published between 1729 and 1732. Catesby used the English name "Gold-winged Wood-pecker" and the Latin Picus major alis aureis. When in 1758 the Swedish naturalist Carl Linnaeus updated his Systema Naturae for its 10th edition, he included the northern flicker, coined the binomial name Cuculus auratus for it, and cited Catesby's book.

The specific epithet auratus is a Latin word meaning "gilded" or "ornamented with gold". The type locality is South Carolina. The northern flicker is one of 14 extant New World woodpeckers now placed in the genus Colaptes that was introduced by the Irish zoologist Nicholas Aylward Vigors in 1825 with the northern flicker (Colaptes auratus) as the type species.

== Subspecies ==
Ten subspecies are recognized, one of which is now extinct, though it may be invalid. The nine extant subspecies were at one time considered subspecies of two separate species called the yellow-shafted flicker (C. auratus, with four subspecies) and the red-shafted flicker (C. cafer, with six subspecies, five living and one extinct), but they commonly interbreed where their ranges overlap and are now considered one species by the American Ornithologists Union. This is an example of what is referred to in science as the species problem.

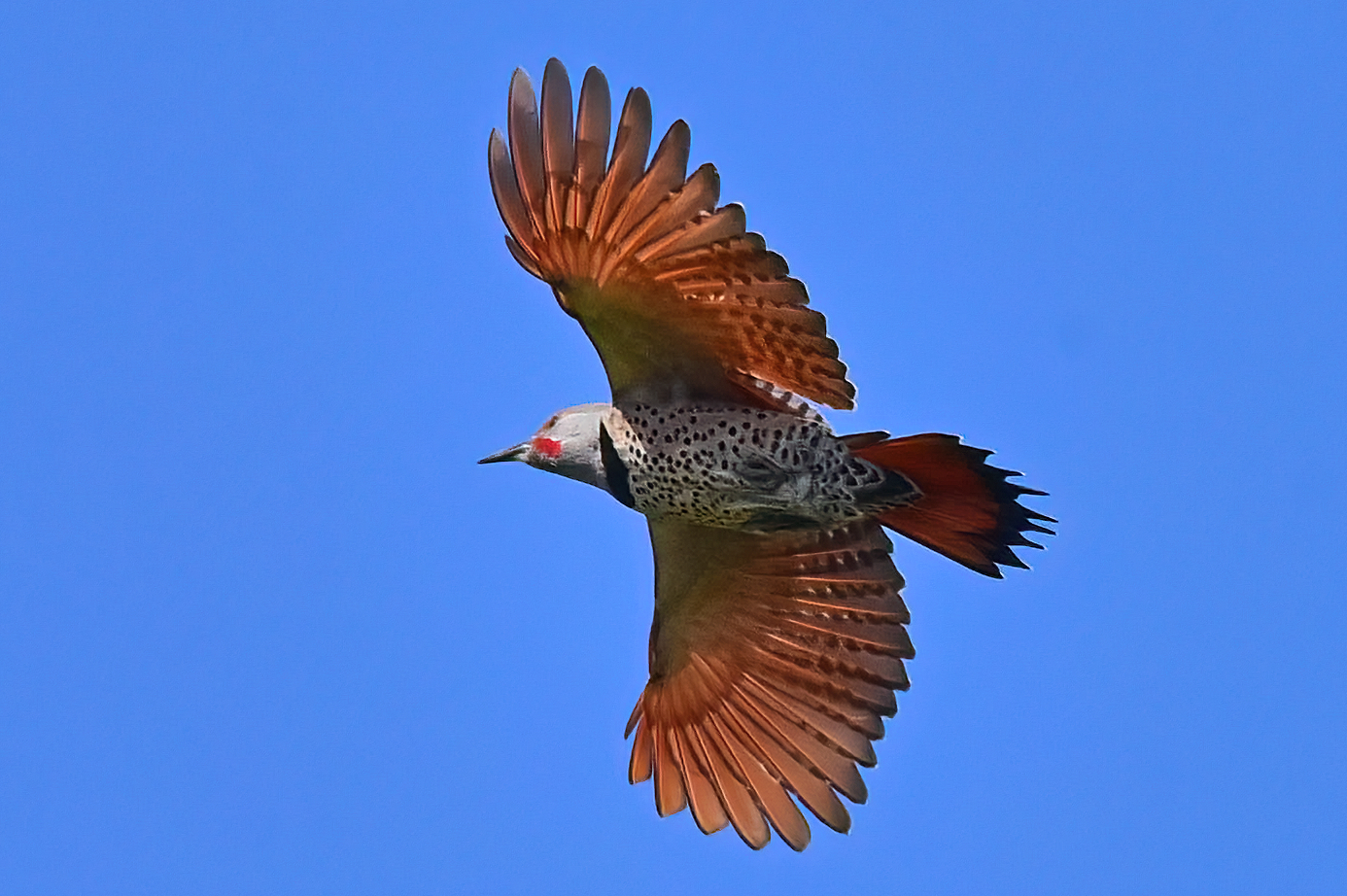
Red-shafted flicker, in British Columbia (Canada)

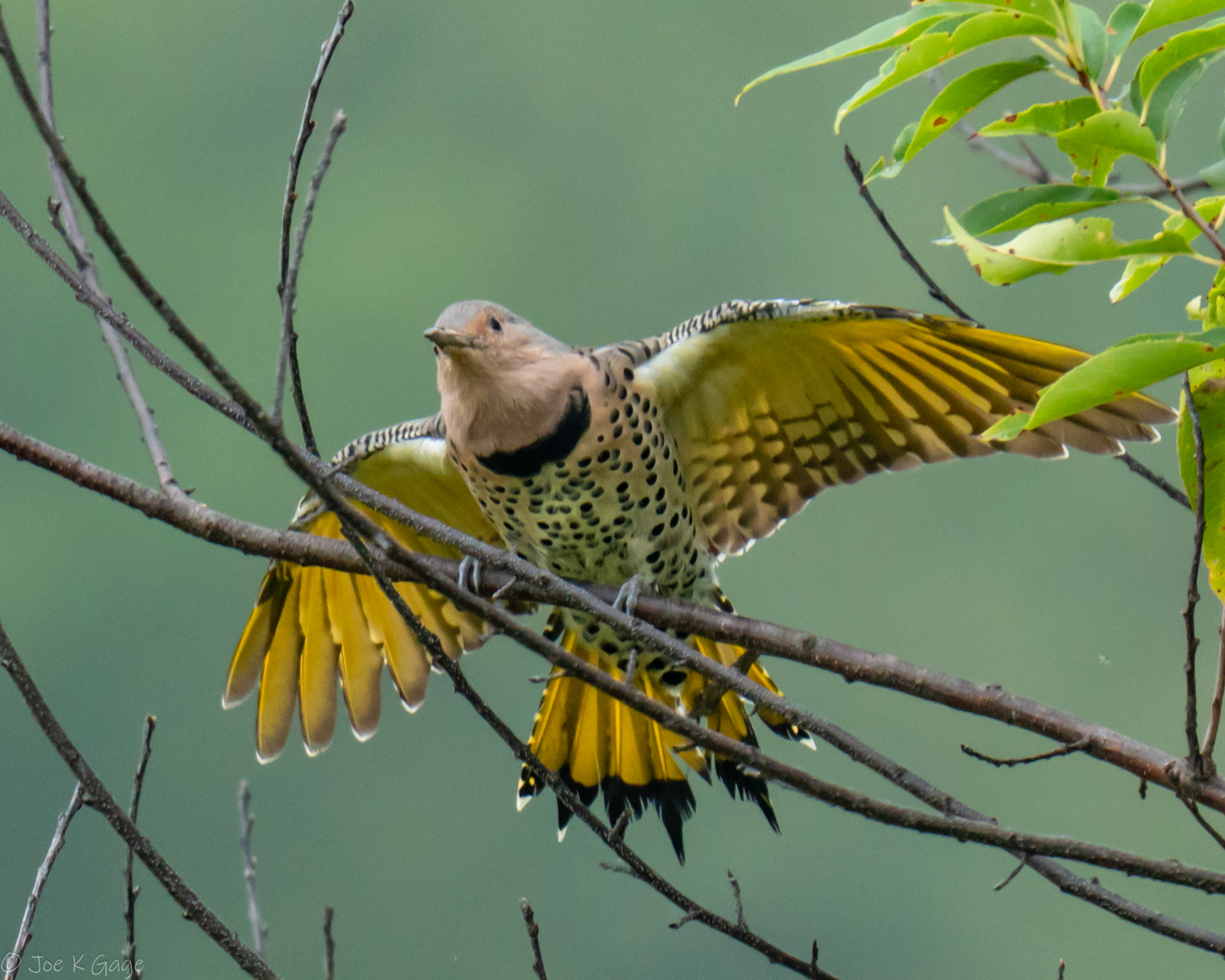
Yellow-shafted flicker, in Illinois (United States)

=== Yellow-shafted group ===
- The southern yellow-shafted flicker (C. a. auratus) resides in the southeastern United States from Florida to Virginia. It is yellow under the tail and underwings and has yellow shafts on its primaries. It has a gray cap, a beige face, and a red bar at the nape of the neck. Males have a black mustache. Colaptes comes from the Greek verb colapt, meaning "to peck"; auratus is from the Latin root aurat, meaning "gold" or "golden", and refers to the bird's underwings.
  - It is the state bird of Alabama and from where it gets the nickname "the Yellowhammer State". The colloquial name "yellowhammer" originated during the American Civil War (1861–1865) to describe Confederate soldiers from Alabama.
- The northern yellow-shafted flicker (C. a. luteus; formerly C. a. borealis) resides from central Alaska throughout most of Canada to southern Labrador, Newfoundland, and the northeastern United States.
- The Cuban yellow-shafted flicker (C. a. chrysocaulosus) is restricted to Cuba.
- The Grand Cayman yellow-shafted flicker (C. a. gundlachi) is restricted to Grand Cayman in the Cayman Islands. The subspecific epithet is named after Cuban naturalist Juan Gundlach.

=== Red-shafted group ===
- The western red-shafted flicker (C. a. cafer) resides in western North America. It is red under the tail and underwings and has red shafts on its primaries. It has a beige cap and a gray face. Males have a red mustache. The subspecific name cafer is the result of an error made in 1788 by the German systematist Johann Gmelin, who believed that its original habitat was in South Africa among the Xhosa people, then known as the "Kaffirs". As the origin of the subspecies designation is regarded as offensive by some, proposals to change the scientific name of this subspecies to C. a. lathami have been presented to the American Ornithological Society. The Society, in accordance with the rules governing scientific nomenclature, has as of September 2018 declined to support a change of the subspecific name, but may consult with the ICZN on the matter.
- The coastal red-shafted flicker (C. a. collaris) has a range that closely adjoins that of C. a. cafer, extending along much of the west coast of North America from the British Columbia Coast along the west coast of the United States to northwestern Mexico.
- The dwarf red-shafted flicker (C. a. nanus) resides from western Texas south to northeastern Mexico.
- The Mexican red-shafted flicker (C. a. mexicanus) resides in central and southern Mexico from Durango to San Luis Potosí and Oaxaca.
- The Guatemalan red-shafted flicker (C. a. mexicanoides) resides in the highlands from southern Mexico to Nicaragua. It is now considered to be a separate species, the Guatemalan flicker (C. mexicanoides).
- The Guadalupe red-shafted flicker (C. a. rufipileus)† is extinct and was formerly restricted to Guadalupe Island, off the northwestern coast of the Baja California peninsula in Mexico. It was last recorded in 1906. It may be invalid. Individuals of an extant mainland red-shafted subspecies (which one is unknown) were observed breeding on Guadalupe Island in 1996.
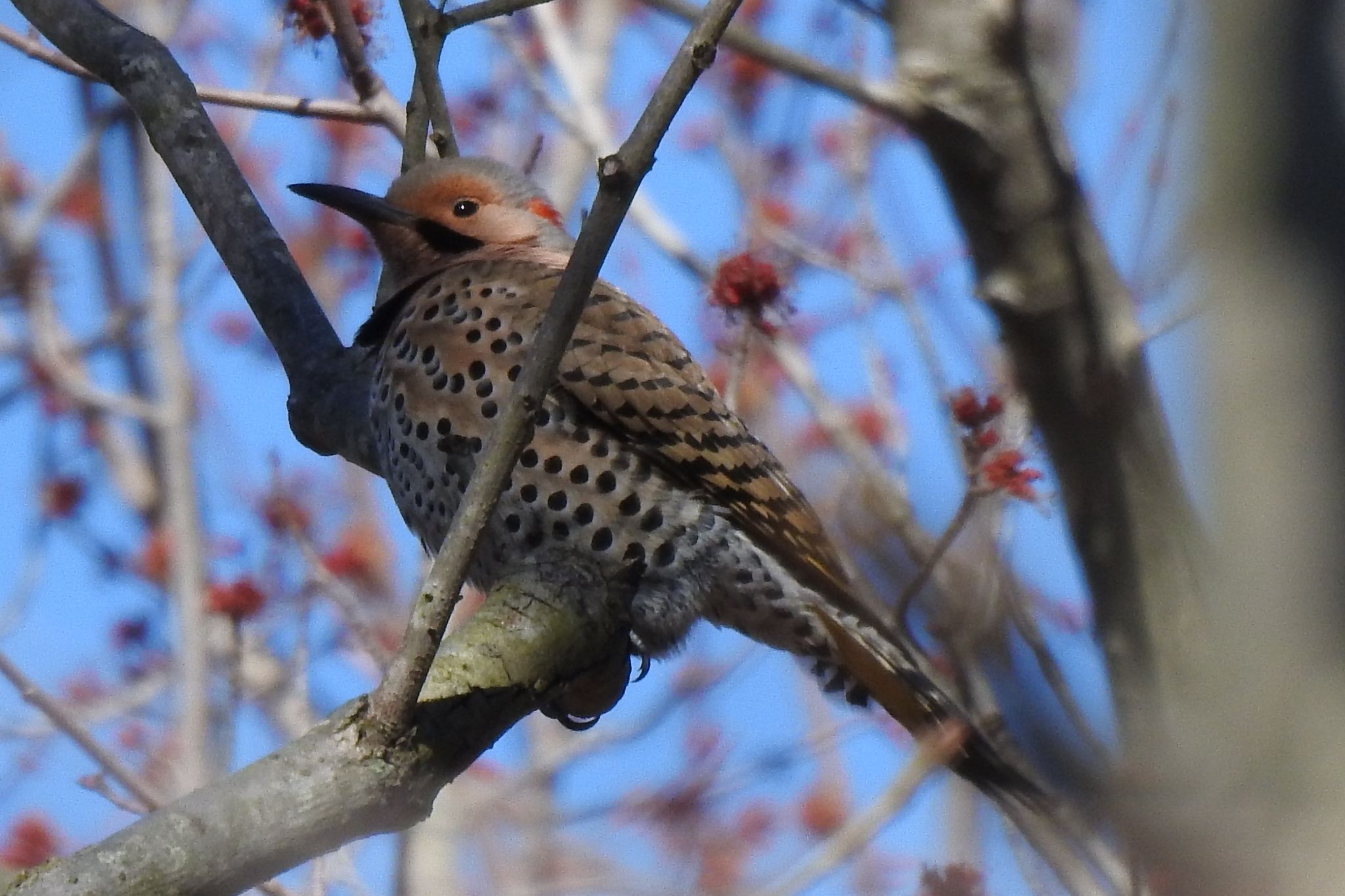
C. a. auratus, in Delaware

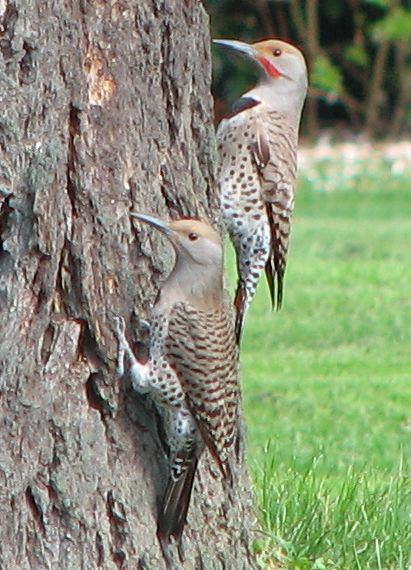
C. a. cafer female (left) and male (right), in Washington

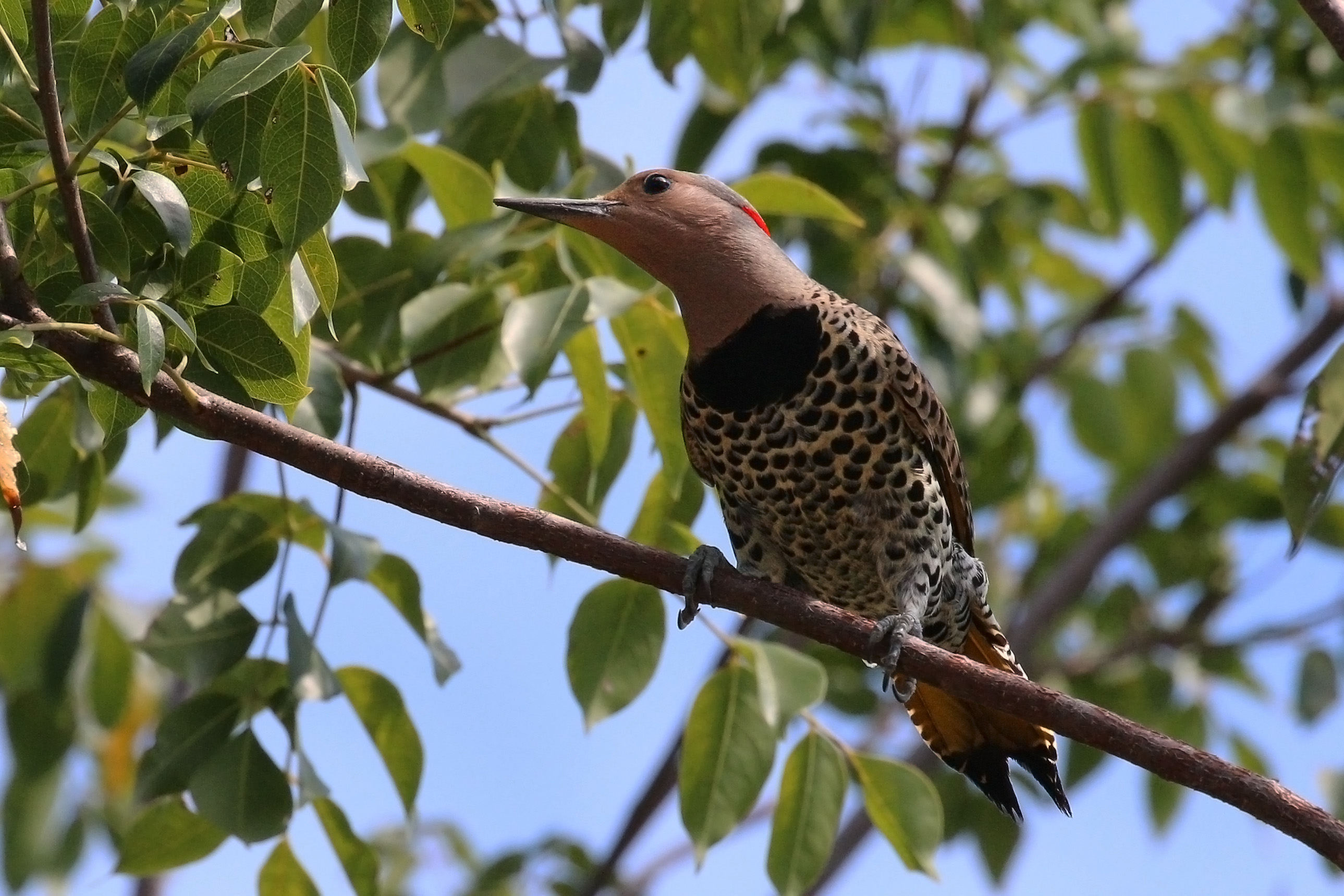
C. a. chrysocaulosus female, in Cuba

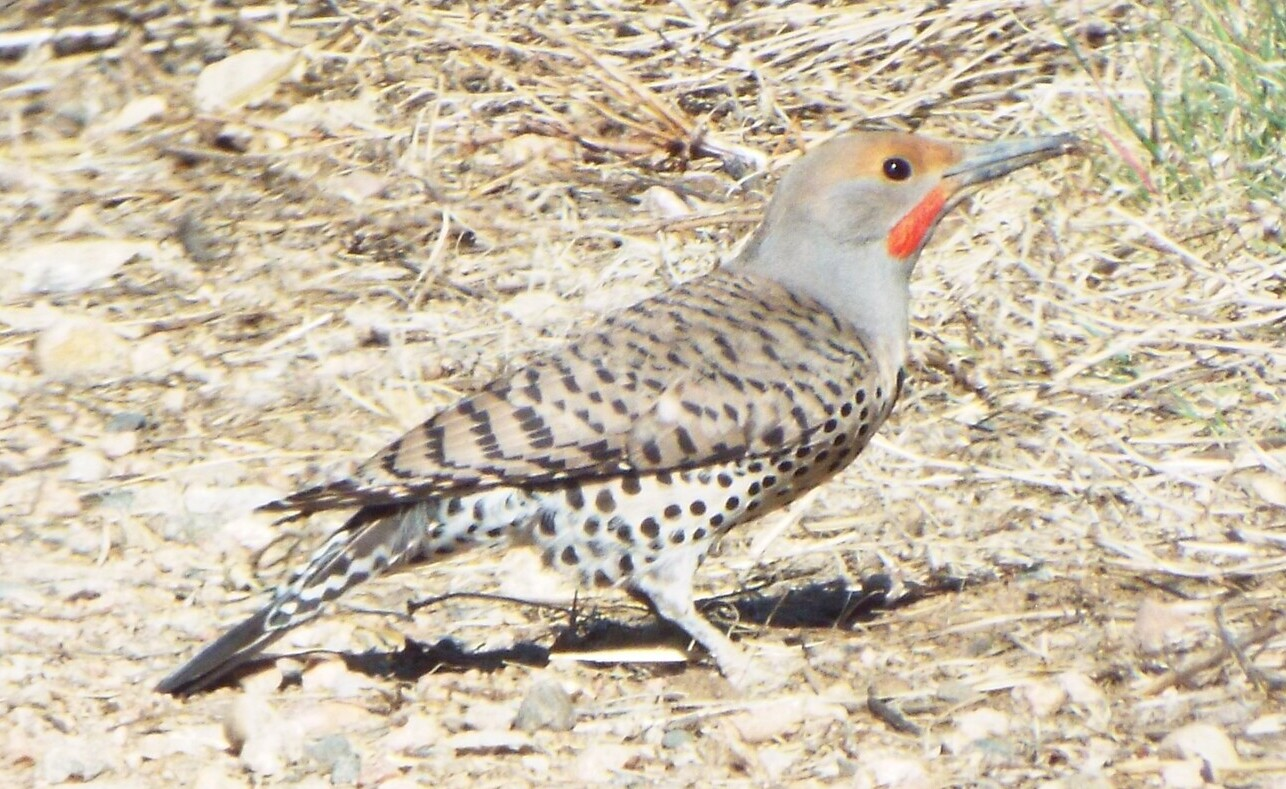
C. a. collaris male, in Colorado

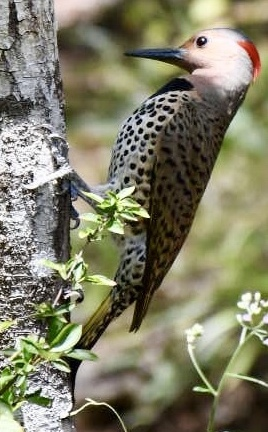
C. a. gundlachi, in Grand Cayman

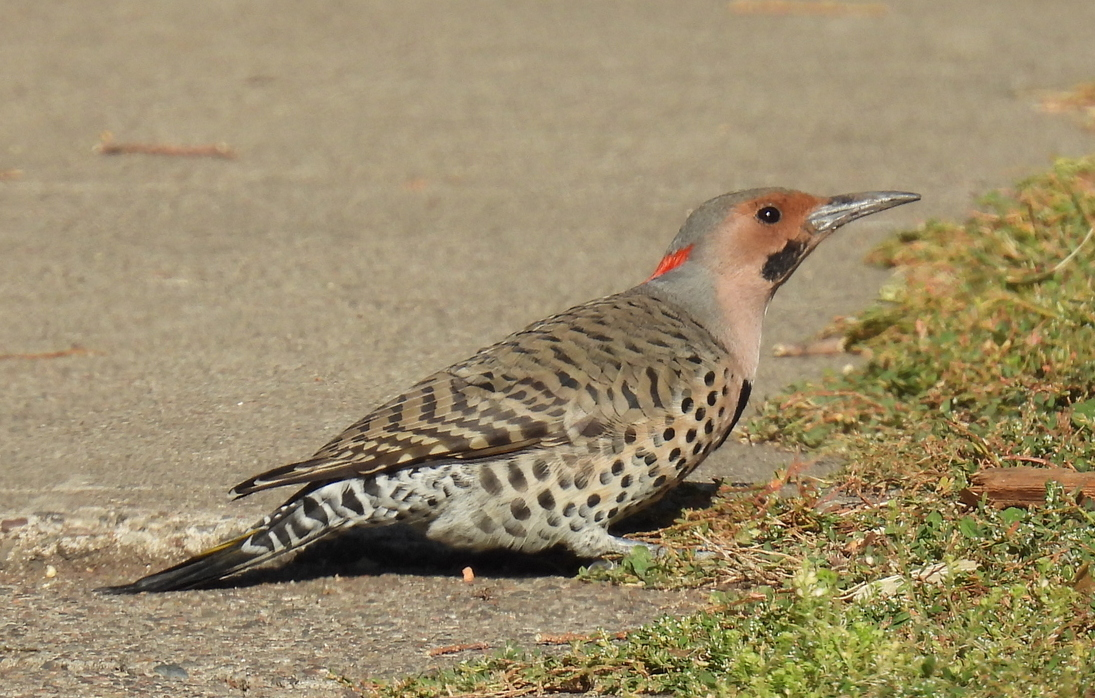
C. a. luteus male, in Minnesota

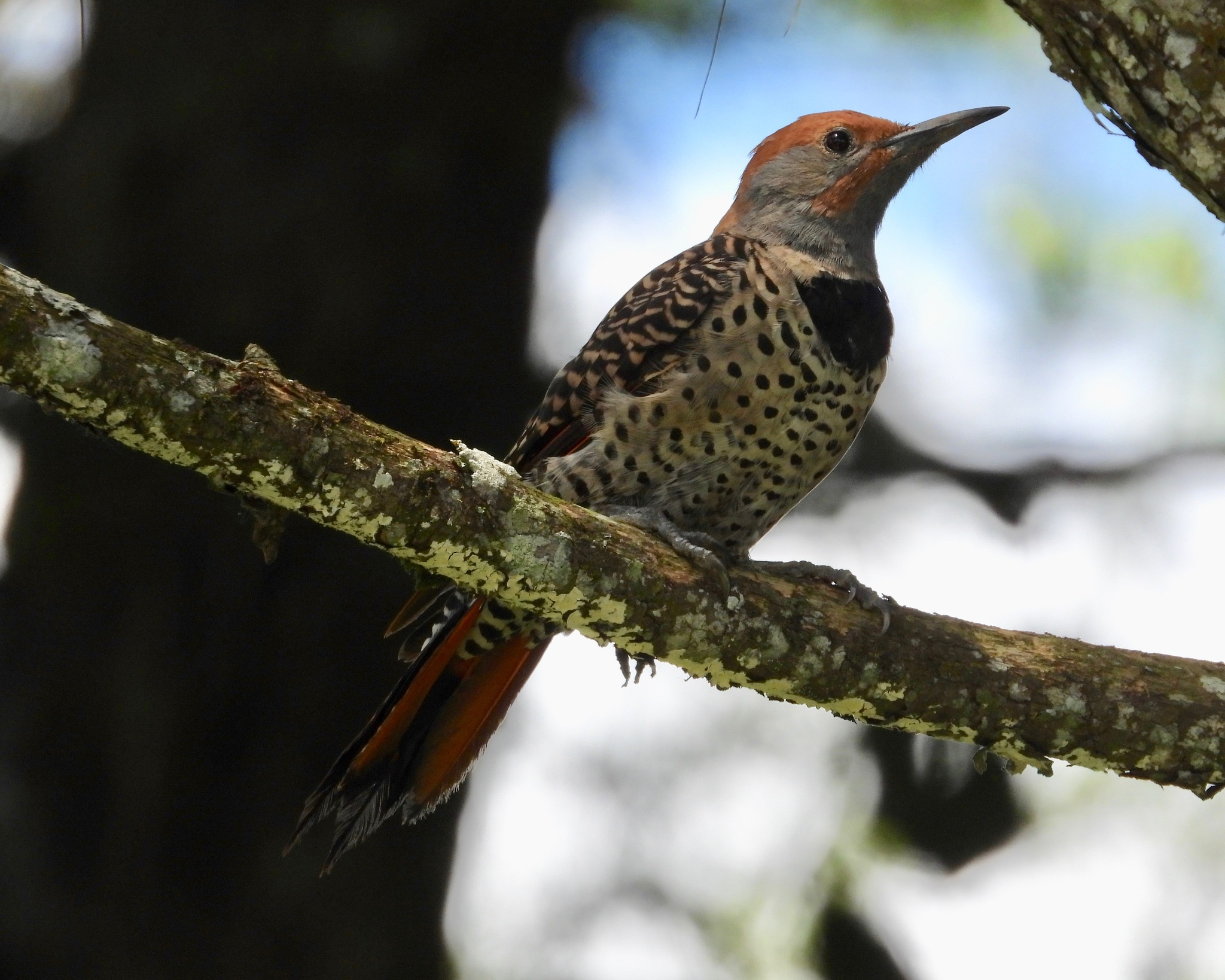
C. a. mexicanoides female, in Guatemala

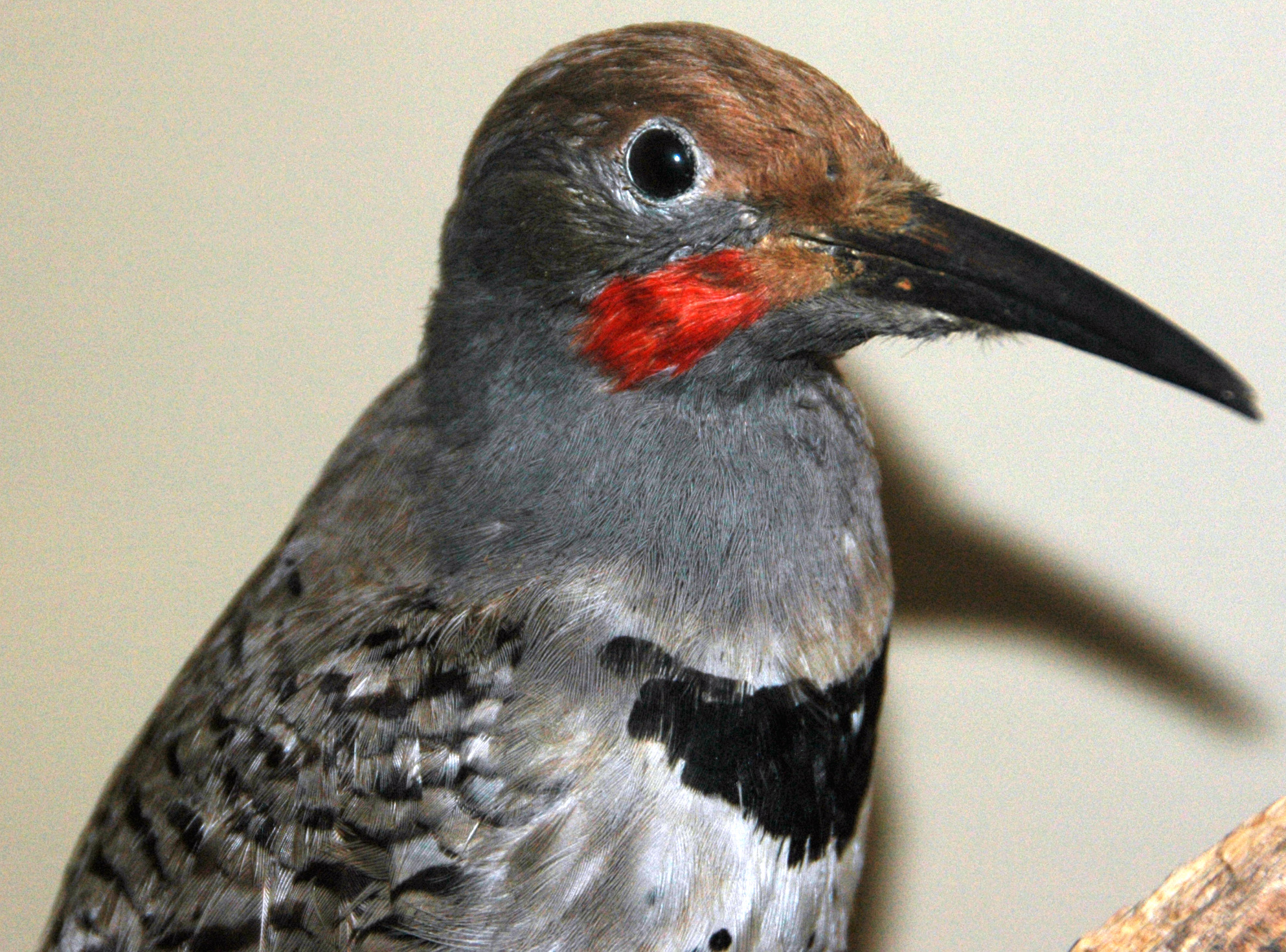
†C. a. rufipileus male, taxidermied specimen

== Description ==
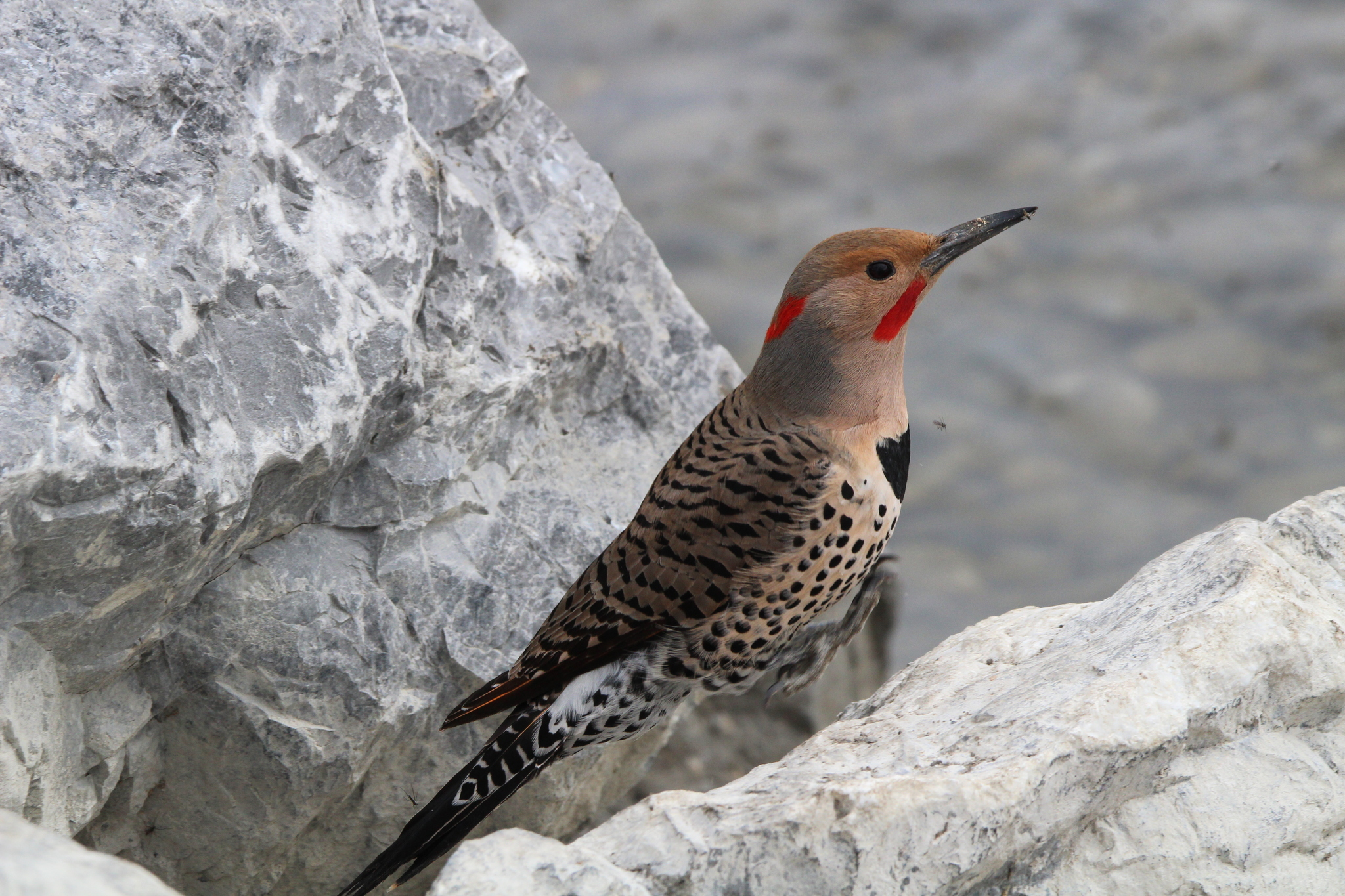
Hybrid male, in Alberta, Canada. This bird has a red mustache like the red-shafted group, and a red nape like the yellow-shafted group. The face and throat are intermediate between the gray color of the former and the peach color of the latter.

Adults are brown with black bars on the back and wings. A mid- to large-sized northern flicker measures 28–36 cm (11–14 in) in length and 42–54 cm (16 1/2–21 1/2 in) in wingspan. The body mass can vary from 86 to 167 g (3 to 5 7/8 oz). Among standard scientific measurements, the wing bone measures 12.2–17.1 cm (4 13/16–6 3/4 in), the tail measures 7.5–11.5 cm (3–4 1/2 in), the bill measures 2.2–4.3 cm (7/8–1 11/16 in) and the tarsus measures 2.2–3.1 cm (7/8–1 1/4 in). The largest-bodied specimens have been found within the species' northern range at the latitudes of Alaska and Labrador, while the smallest specimens have been recorded being found in Grand Cayman. A necklace-like black patch occupies the upper breast, while the lower breast and belly are beige with black spots. Males can be identified by a black (in the eastern part of the species' range) or red (in the western part) mustachial stripe at the base of the beak, while females lack this stripe. The tail is dark on top, transitioning to a white rump which is conspicuous in flight. Subspecific plumage is variable.

=== Call and flight ===
Calls

Long Island, NY, August 1996

Yosemite National Park, California

This bird's call is a sustained laugh, ki ki ki ki, quite different from that of the pileated woodpecker (Dryocopus pileatus). One may also hear a constant knocking as they often drum on trees or even metal objects to declare territory. Like most woodpeckers, northern flickers drum on objects as a form of communication and territory defense. In such cases, the purpose is to make as loud a noise as possible, so woodpeckers sometimes drum on metal objects.

Like many woodpeckers, its flight is undulating. The repeated cycle of a quick succession of flaps followed by a pause creates an effect comparable to a roller coaster.

== Diet ==
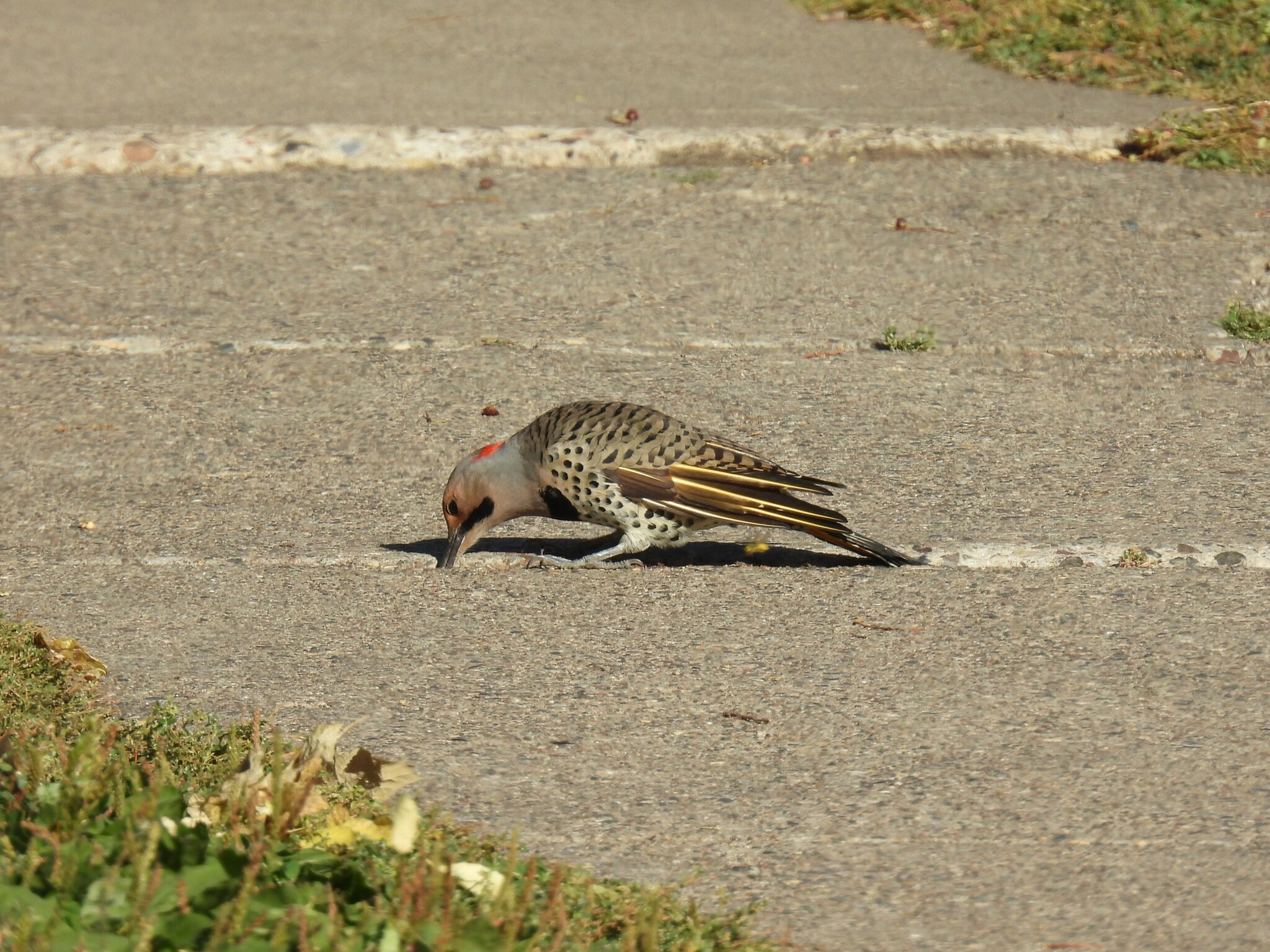
C. a. luteus foraging on the ground, in Minnesota

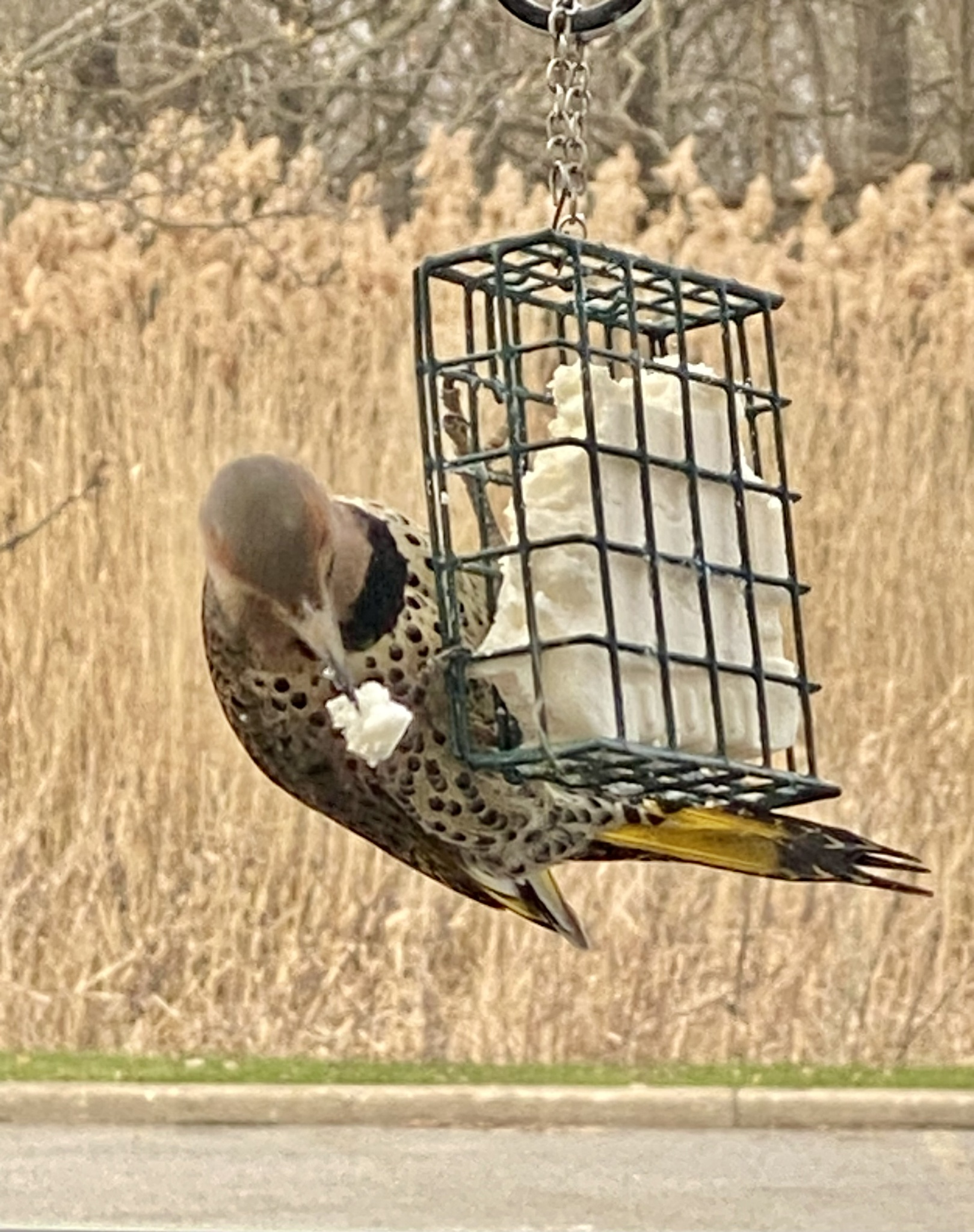
C. a. luteus eating suet at a feeder, in New York

According to the Audubon field guide, "flickers are the only woodpeckers that frequently feed on the ground", probing with their beak, also sometimes catching insects in flight. Although they eat fruits, berries, seeds, and nuts, their primary food is insects. Ants alone can make up 45% of their diet. Other invertebrates eaten include flies, butterflies, moths, beetles, and snails. Northern flickers also eat berries and seeds, especially in winter, including those of poison ivy, poison oak, dogwood, sumac, wild cherry, and grape, bayberries, hackberries, and elderberries, as well as sunflower and thistle seeds. Northern flickers often break into underground ant colonies to get at the nutritious larvae there, hammering at the soil the way other woodpeckers drill into wood. They have been observed breaking up cow dung to eat the insects living within. Their tongues can dart out 50 mm (2 in) beyond the end of the bill to catch prey. The northern flicker is a natural predator of the European corn borer (Ostrinia nubilalis), an invasive species of moth that costs the U.S. agriculture industry more than $1 billion annually in crop losses and population control. As well as eating ants, northern flickers exhibit a behavior known as anting, in which they use the formic acid from the ants to assist in preening, as it is useful in keeping them free of parasites.

=== Influence of diet on offspring ===
According to an article published in Ibis, the availability of food affects the coloration of feathers in northern flicker nestlings. The article focused on the correlation between melanin spots and carotenoid-based coloration on the wings of nestlings with food stress via indirect manipulation of brood size. The article found that there was a positive correlation between the quality of the nestlings' diet and T-cell-mediated immune response. T-cell-mediated immune response was found to be positively correlated with brightness of pigmentation in flight feathers, but not related to melanin spot intensity.

== Habitat ==
The northern flicker may be observed in open habitats near trees, including woodlands, edges, yards, and parks. In the western United States, one can find it in mountain forests all the way up to the tree line. The northern flicker generally nests in holes in trees like other woodpeckers. Occasionally, it has been found nesting in old, earthen burrows vacated by belted kingfishers (Megaceryle alcyon) or sand martins (Riparia riparia). Both sexes help with the nest excavation. The entrance hole is about 8 cm (3 in) in diameter, and the cavity is 33–41 cm (13–16 in) deep. The cavity widens at the bottom to make room for the eggs and the incubating adult. Inside, the cavity is bare except for a bed of wood chips for the eggs and chicks to rest on. Once the nestlings are about 17 days old, they begin clinging to the cavity wall rather than lying on the floor. They can create cavities inside homes, especially homes of stucco or weak wooden siding.

== Lifespan ==
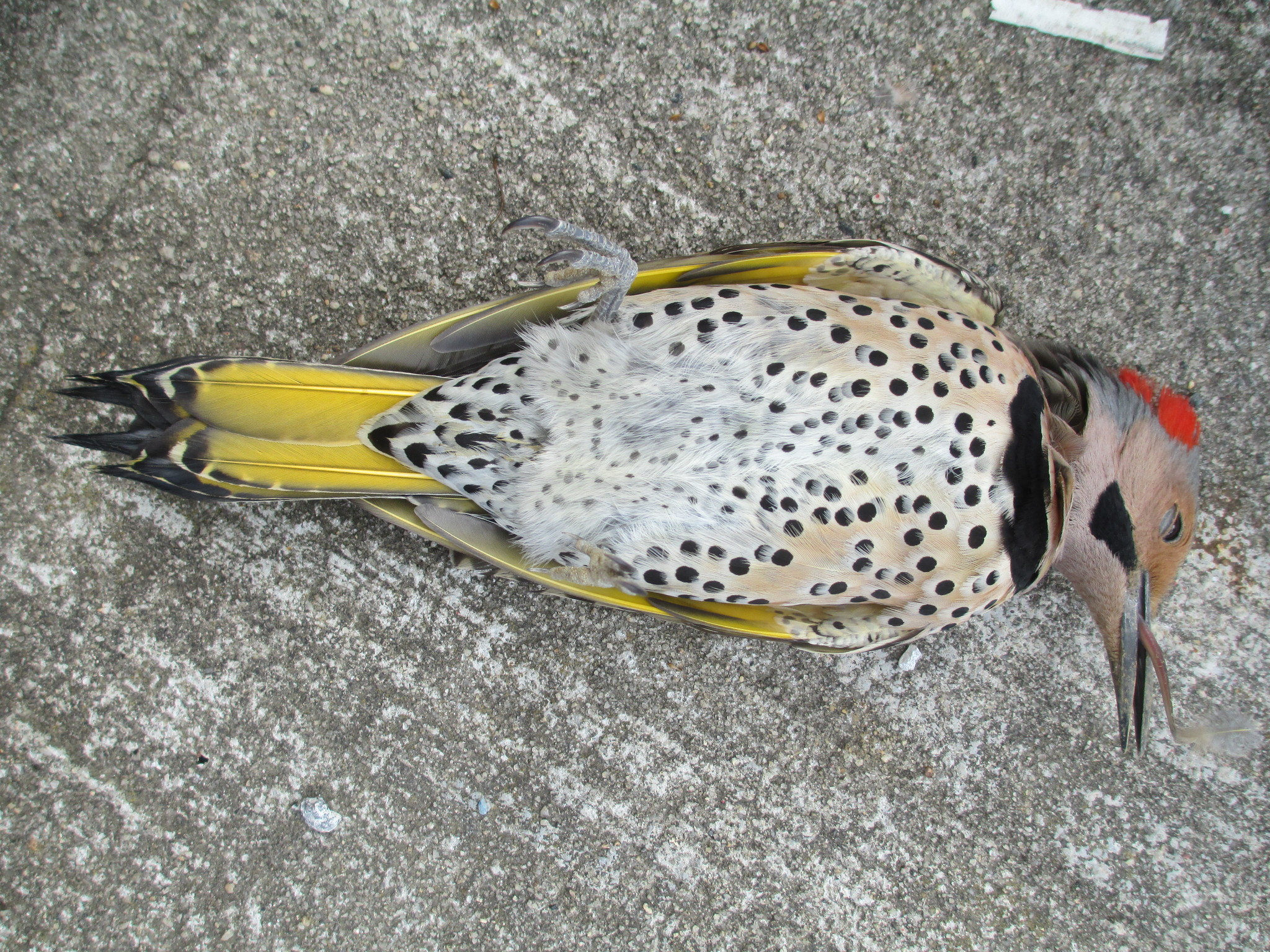
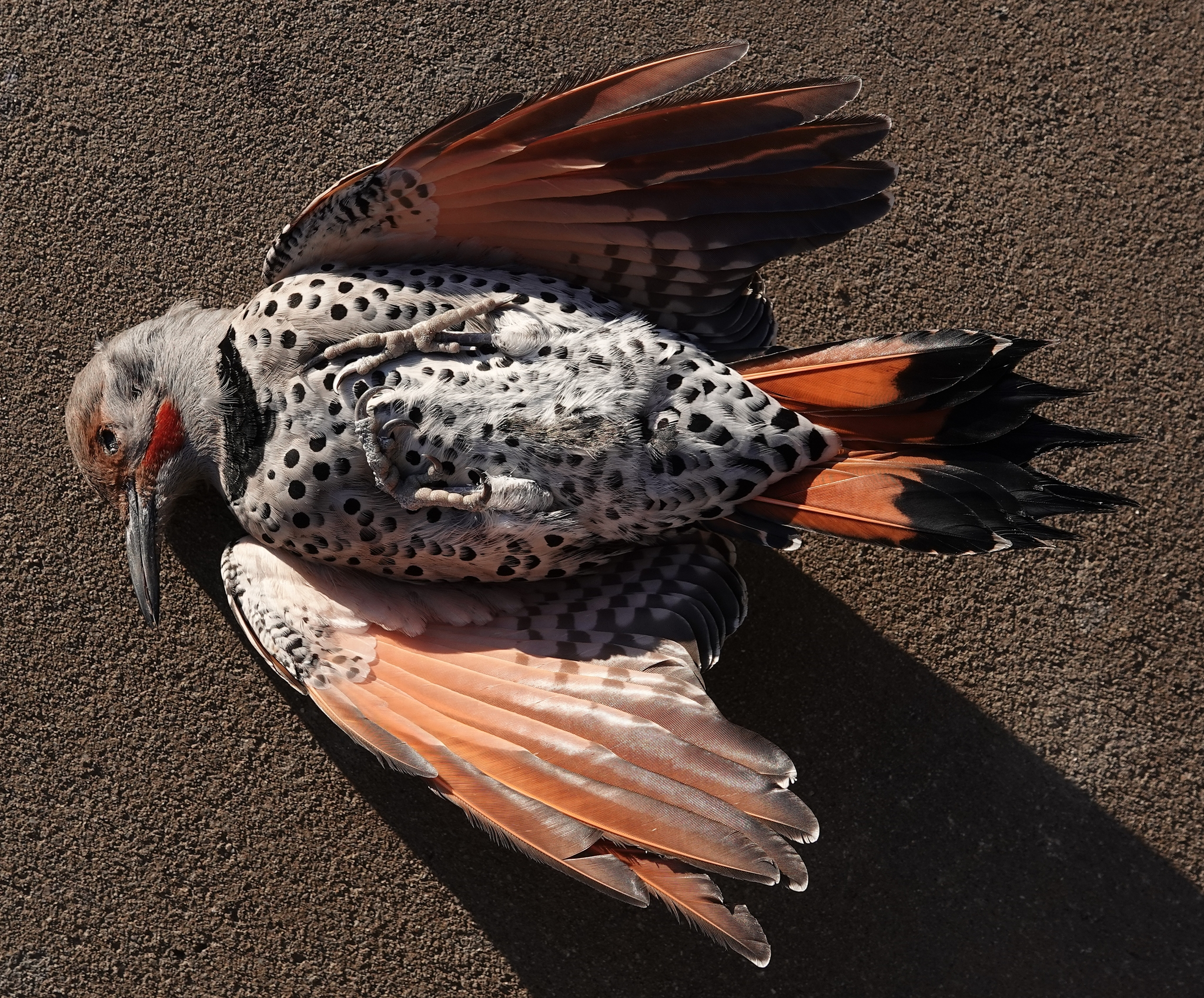
Ventral comparison between males of the yellow-shafted C. a. auratus (left) and the red-shafted C. a. cafer (right). Both were killed in window collisions

A study from 2006 examined the mortality rates of male and female northern flickers over a six-year period using capture-tag-recapture techniques. The researchers observed that only one to two birds out of every 300 adults were 7 or more years old. This observation data correlated well with a mortality model that predicted a 0.6% 7-year survival rate. The data also illustrated that there were no significant differences between male and female survival rates for the general population. The oldest yet known "yellow-shafted" northern flicker lived to be at least 9 years 2 months old, and the oldest yet known "red-shafted" northern flicker lived to be at least 8 years 9 months old.

=== Reproduction ===
The northern flicker's breeding habitat consists of forested areas across North America and as far south as Central America. It is a cavity nester that typically nests in trees, but may also use posts and birdhouses if sized and situated appropriately. It prefers to excavate its own home, although it may reuse and repair damaged or abandoned nests. Often the old nests are created by belted kingfishers or sand martins. Abandoned northern flicker nests create habitats for other cavity nesters. The northern flicker is sometimes driven away from its nesting site by other cavity nesters like the common starling (Sturnus vulgaris).

The northern flicker commonly breeds during the months of February to July, depending upon the temperature of the area. During the breeding season, both mates stay together. After the season, they do not stay together. Before breeding season, one to two weeks are needed for a mated pair to build the nest. Male flickers find female flickers by head bobbing and their personal mating call. The common sounds a male makes towards a female is woikawoikawoika, symbolizing their relationship to one another and other birds. If the call is used towards a male, it is a territorial sign. The calls' pattern can be classified as flat and gradually rises into a loud noise. The call type is a chirp that drums and rattles.

Additional territorial signs towards other males can be head swinging when in close proximity to another or repeatedly creating loud noises with their beaks. Commonly used objects are wood or metal for a louder sound. While making the loud noises, they will spread their wings, moving them up and down, spreading their tail to flash their colorful underside. The color of their feathers depends on the environment surrounding the bird. Currently, there is no direct correlation between the birds' colors and mate choice. Rather, it plays a bigger role in territory.

The northern flicker may also point its bill forward towards a competitor for territorial reasons. Juvenile northern flickers are often helpless against predators who enter the nest. The common predators are Cooper's hawks (Astur cooperii), sharp-shinned hawks (Accipter striatus), common raccoons (Procyon lotor), squirrels, and snakes. Full grown northern flickers are preyed upon by larger birds and hunting birds. The entrance hole of their nest is roughly 5 to 10 cm (2.0 to 3.9 in) wide. The hole entrance is often facing east to southeast. On average, the northern flicker can have one to two clutches each breeding season. A typical clutch consists of six to eight eggs whose shells are pure white with a smooth surface and high gloss. The eggs are the second-largest of all of the North American woodpecker species, exceeded only by the pileated woodpecker's. Incubation is by both sexes for about 11 to 12 days. Commonly the male will sit on the eggs overnight, and both the male and female will incubate the eggs during the day. The young are fed by regurgitation and fledge about 25 to 28 days after hatching.

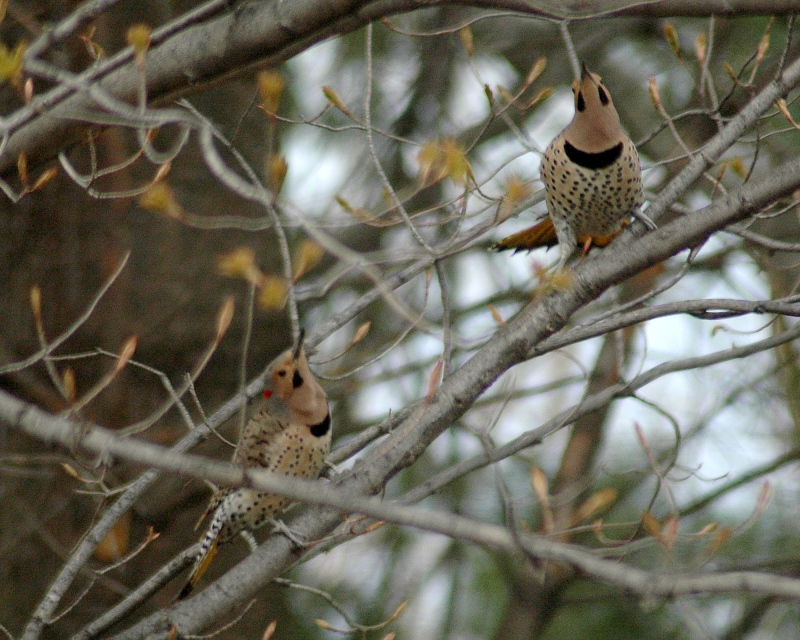
Two males in a territorial display during spring

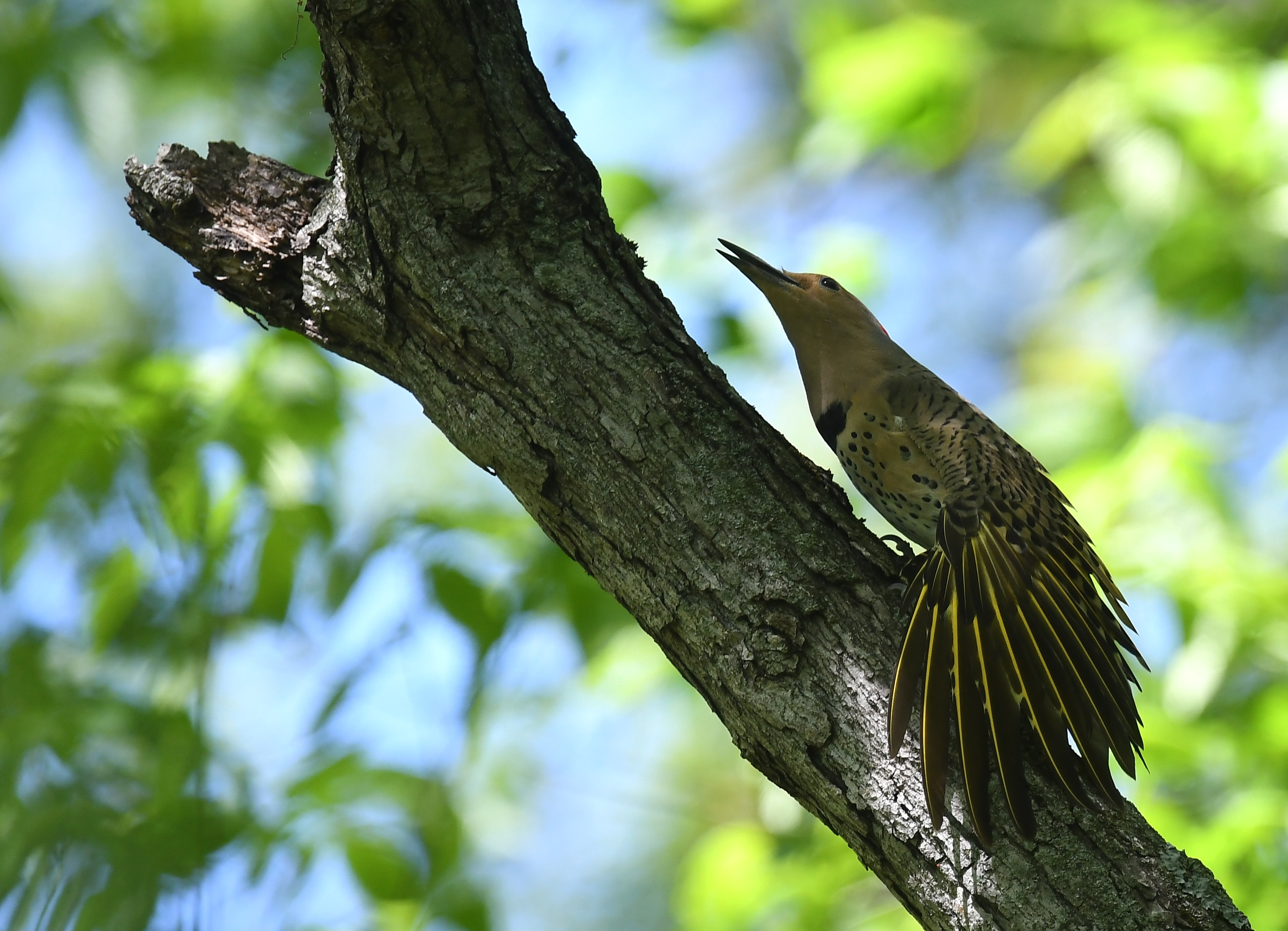
Spreading wings to show off its size and colors in a dominance display

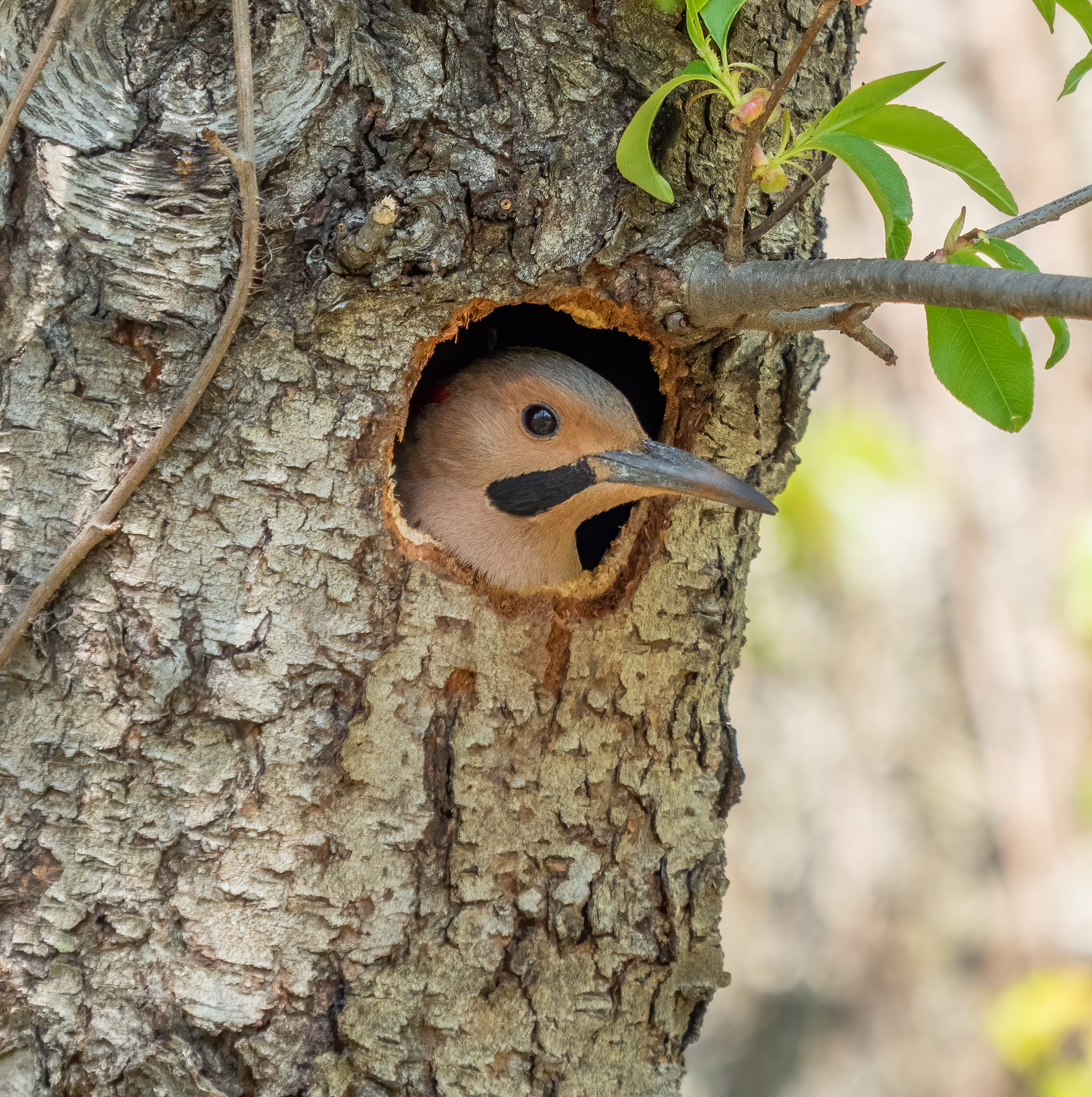
A male guarding its nest cavity

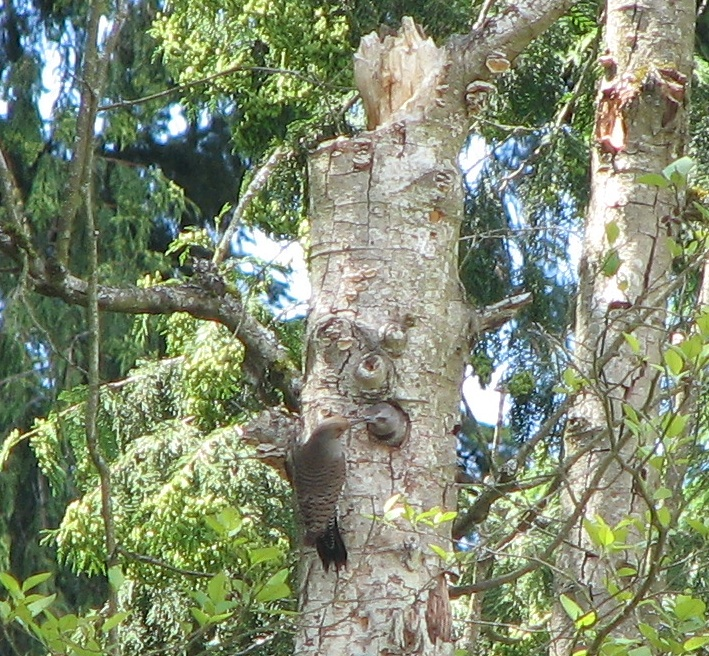
An adult feeding a juvenile at a nest cavity entrance

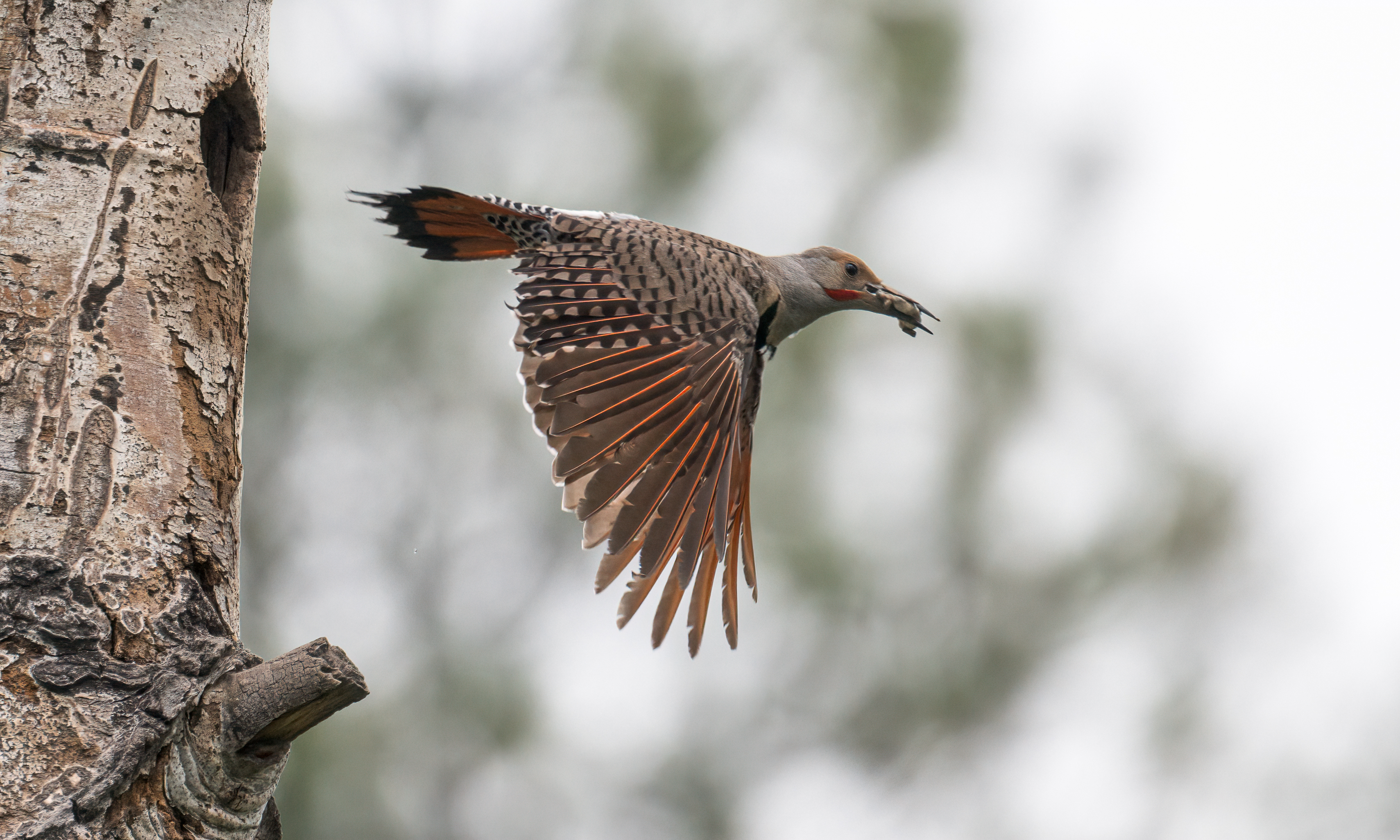
A male carrying a fecal sac away from the nest

=== Wintering and migration ===
Northern flickers are partial migrants, some southern populations being completely non-migratory. Those that do migrate tend to begin their spring migration towards the beginning of April and make their return between September and October. Individuals that breed farther north travel greater distances than their migratory southern conspecifics, often resulting in the convergence of northern and southern populations at wintering sites. This discrepancy likely arises from the species' ground foraging behavior, where prey can only be found in snow-free locations. Furthermore, females tend to winter farther north than males, suggesting that parental investment and division of reproductive labour are key factors in determining individual migratory behavior. Rising temperatures have been shown to trigger migration prematurely in northern flickers as well as many other migratory bird species, as evidenced in Sherbrooke, Quebec.

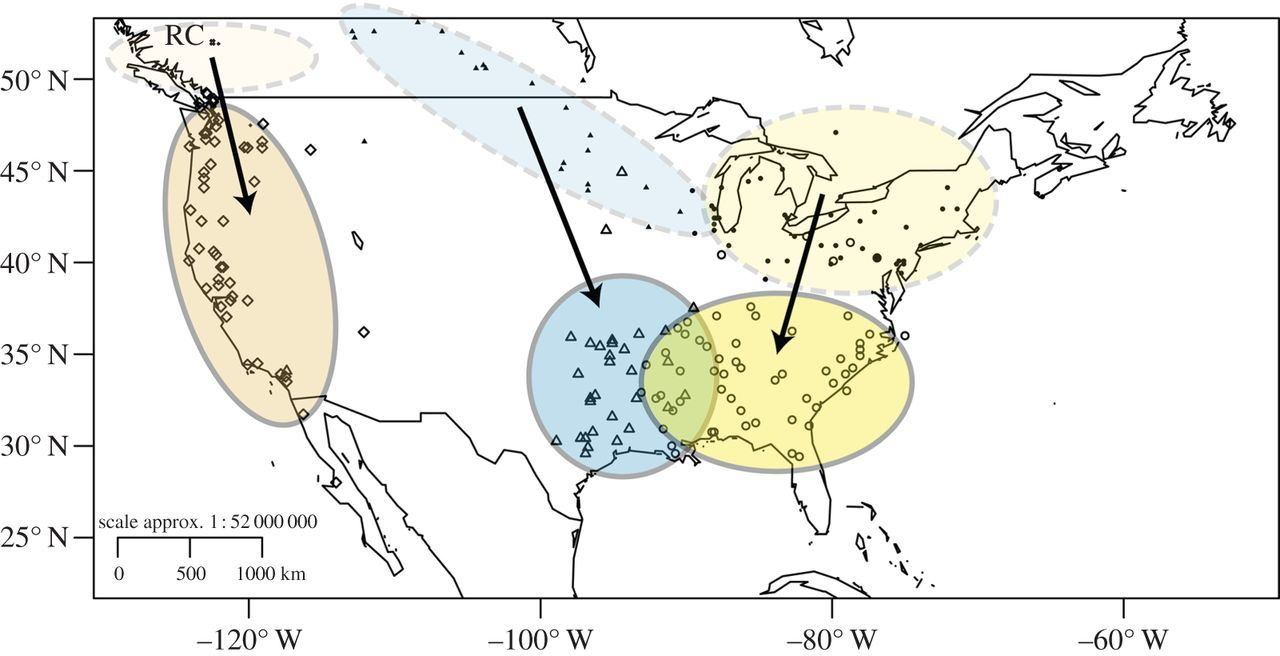
Connections between breeding and wintering location of northern flickers

Northern flickers are divided into eastern and western populations by the Rocky Mountains, with each population having a unique migratory pathway. Individuals breeding in the prairie provinces of Canada, the Dakotas, and the surrounding U.S. states winter in Texas, Oklahoma, and Arkansas. Those breeding from southern Ontario and Michigan to New England winter from eastern Texas to the Carolinas, whereas those breeding in British Columbia and the Pacific Northwest winter from central California to the Baja California peninsula in Mexico.

During migration, northern flickers may form flocks. Additionally, the species' propensity for roosting in cavities is not mitigated during migration. On average, 75% of individuals spend their nights in a cavity during migration, even in completely unknown locations. Northern flickers demonstrate a high rate of nest cavity re-use, as opposed to excavating new cavities each year. Furthermore, breeding individuals exhibit intense site fidelity, with pairs consistently returning to the specific nest cavity they used in the previous year.

== Gallery ==
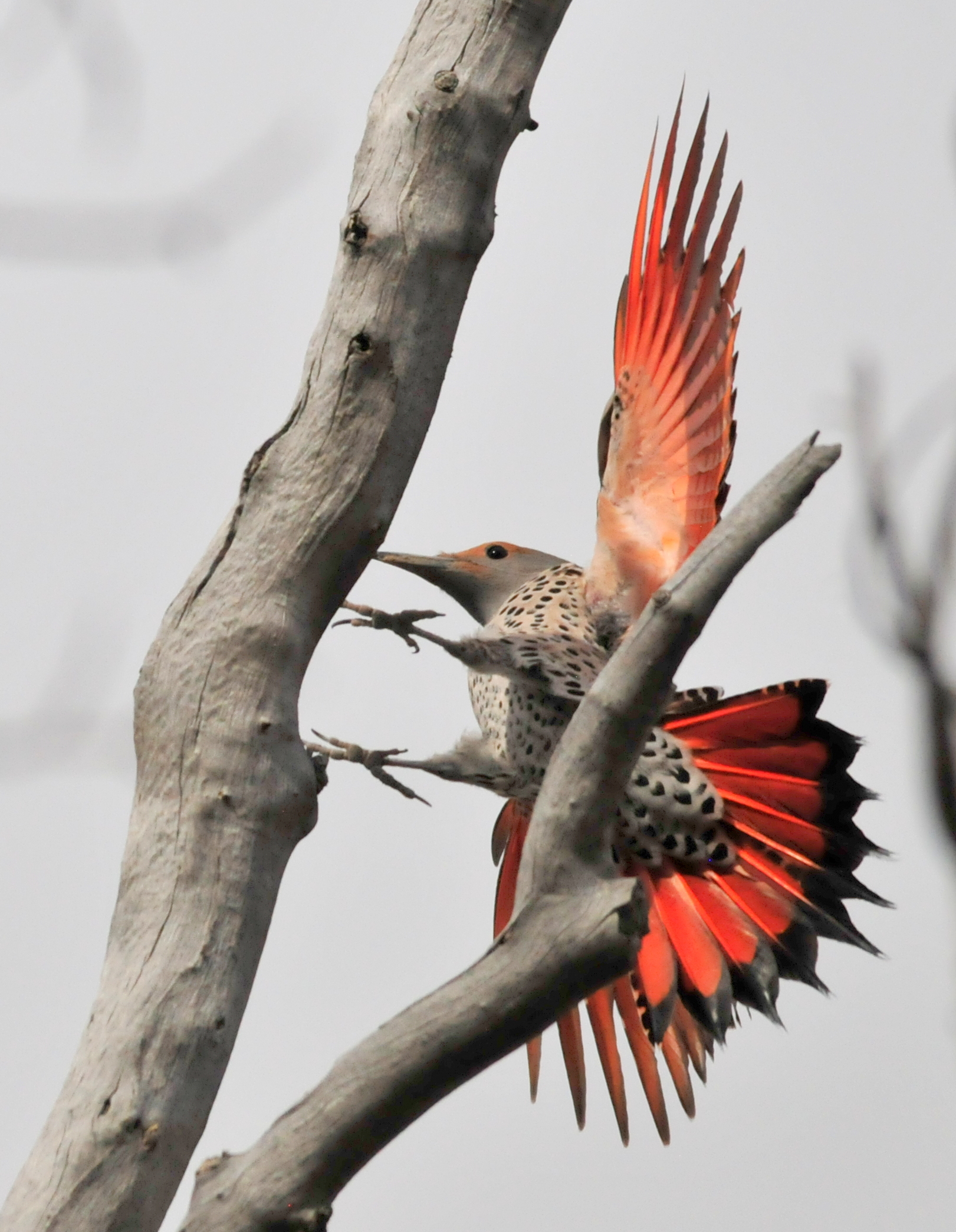
A northern flicker at a tree in the Seedskadee National Wildlife Refuge in Wyoming

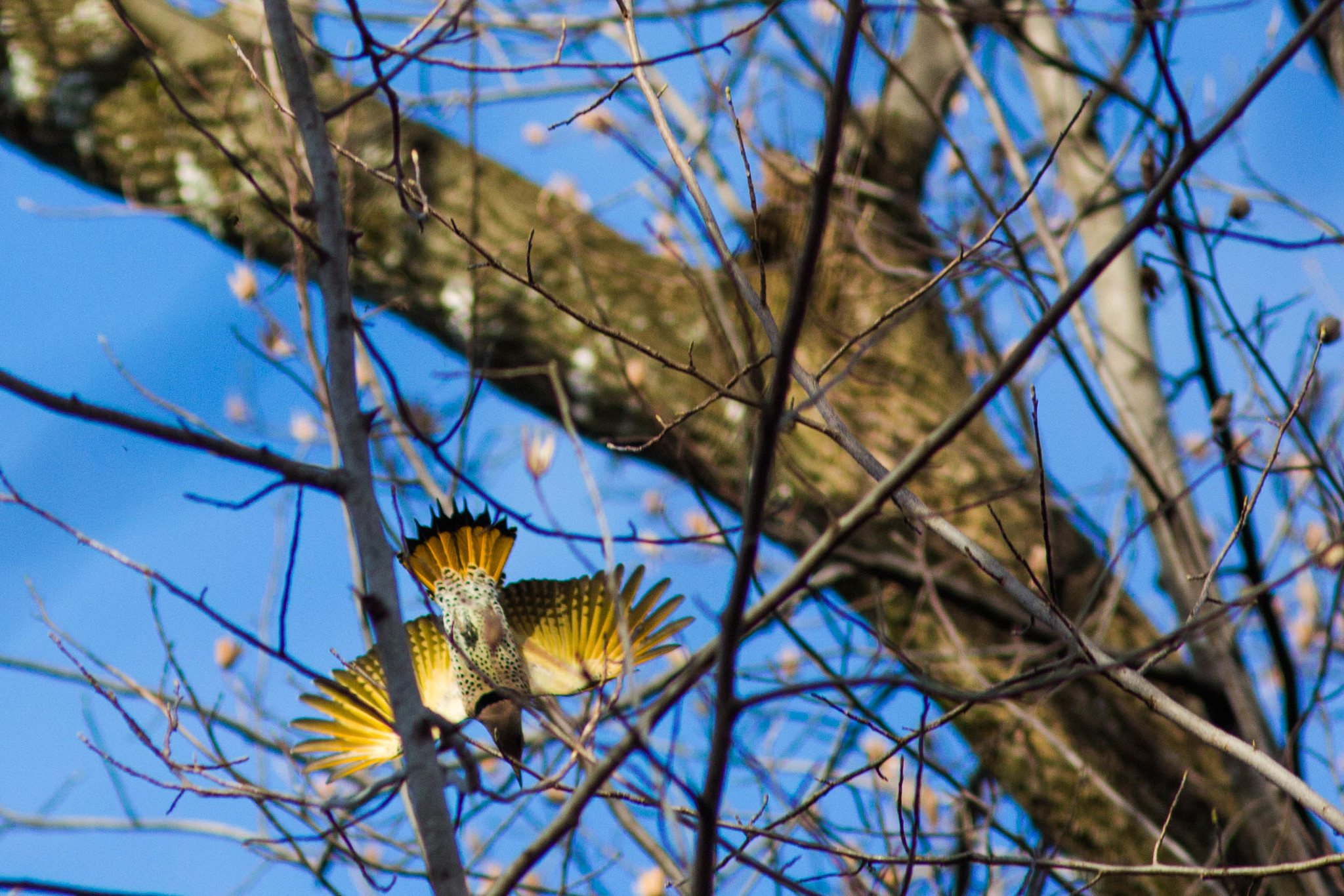
C. a. auratus, in Tennessee

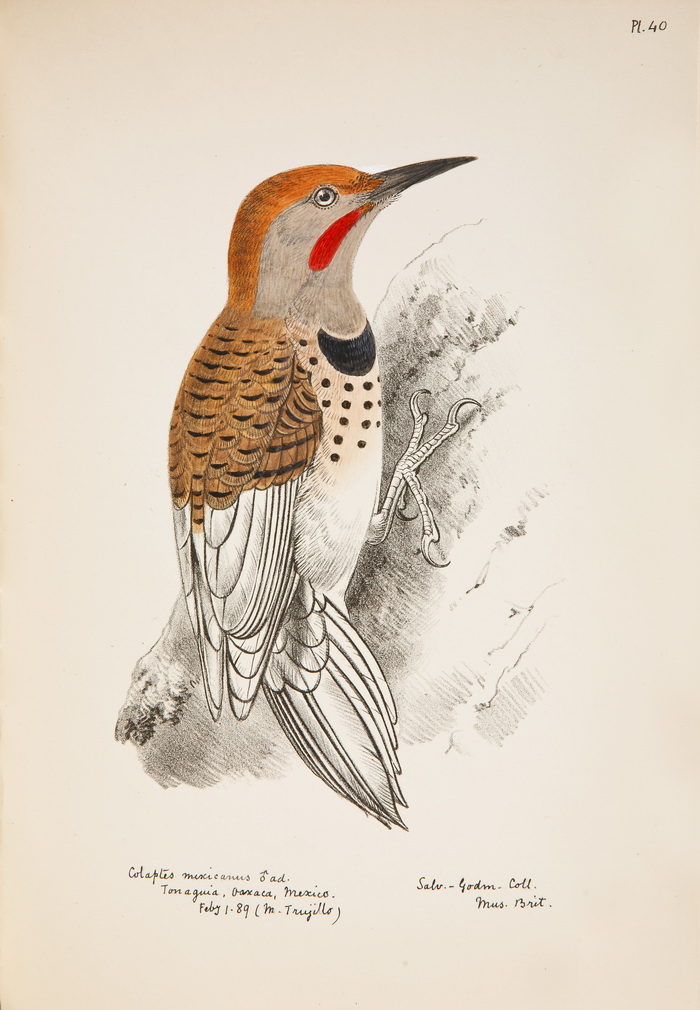
Painting of "Colaptes mexicanus" by Edward Hargitt, 1889

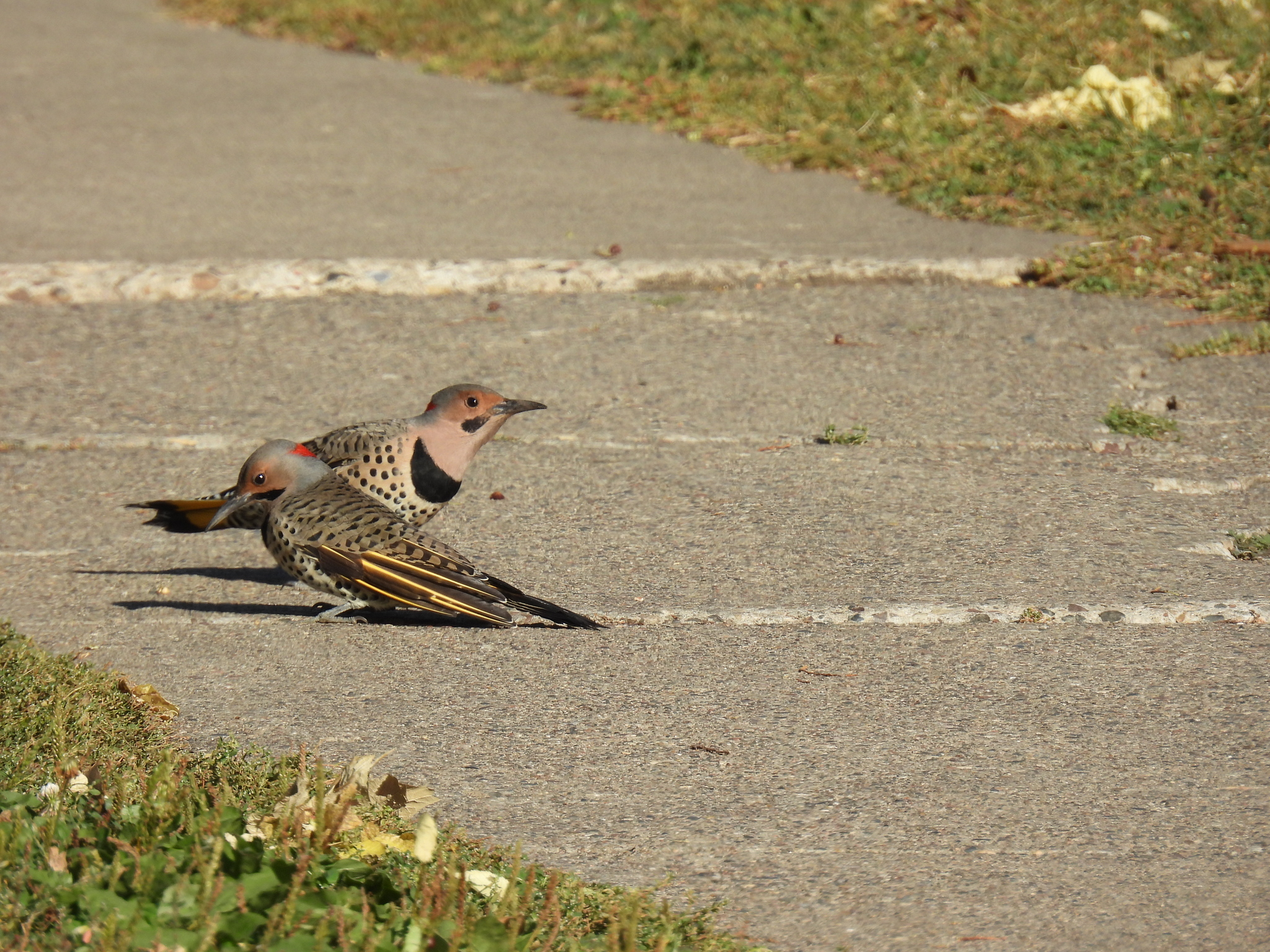
C. a. luteus, in Minnesota

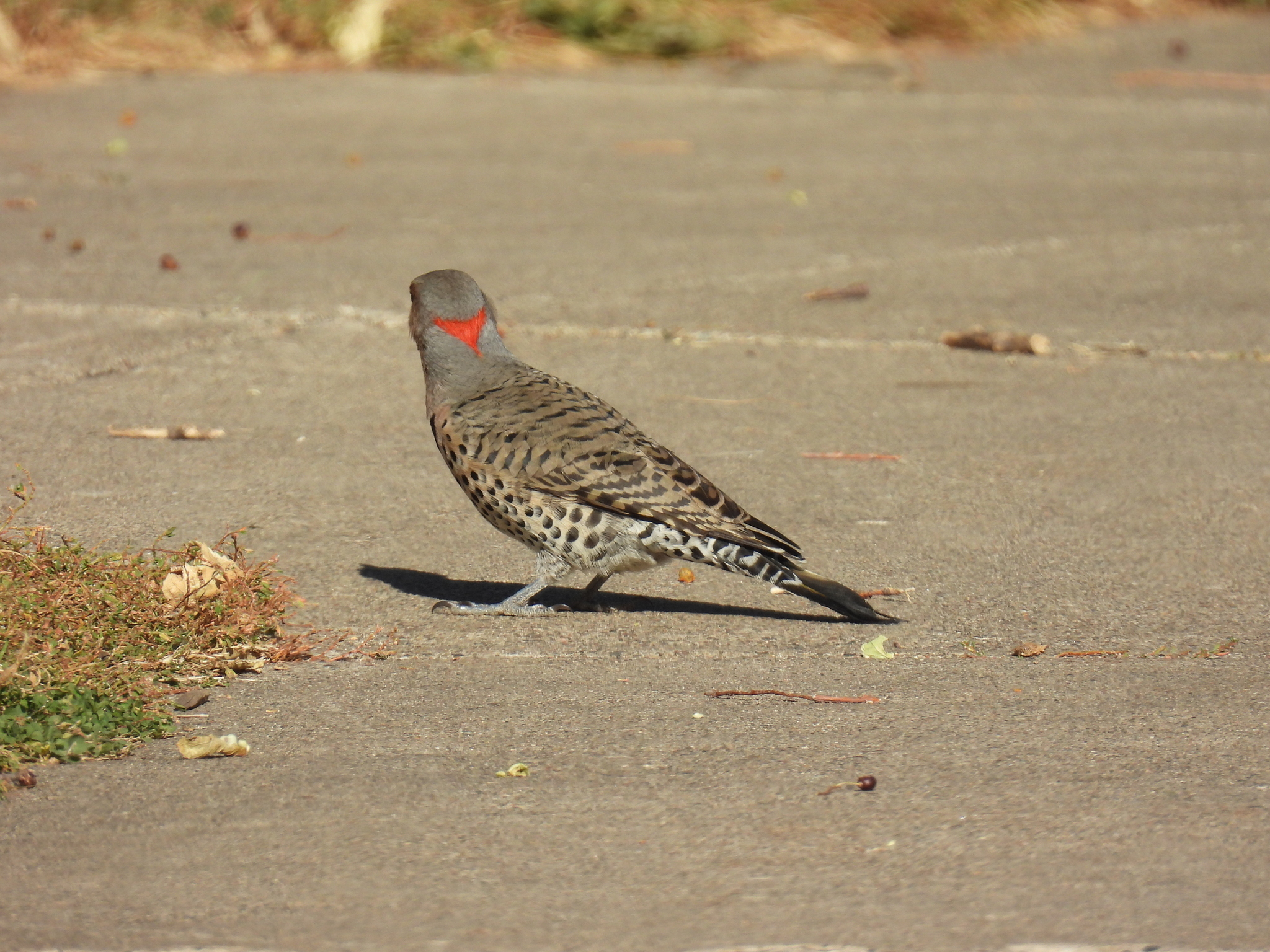
C. a. luteus, in Minnesota

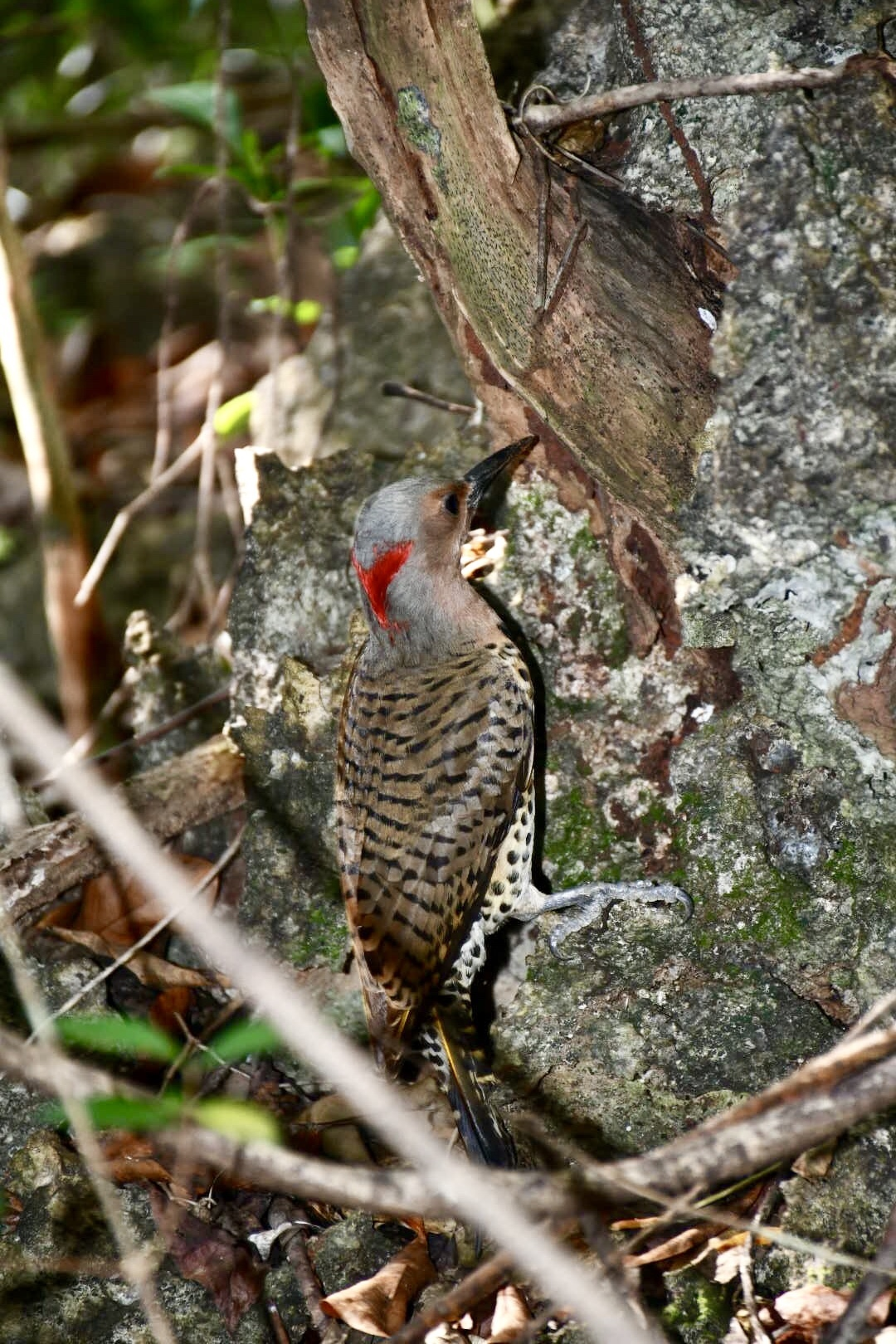
C. a. gundlachi, in Grand Cayman

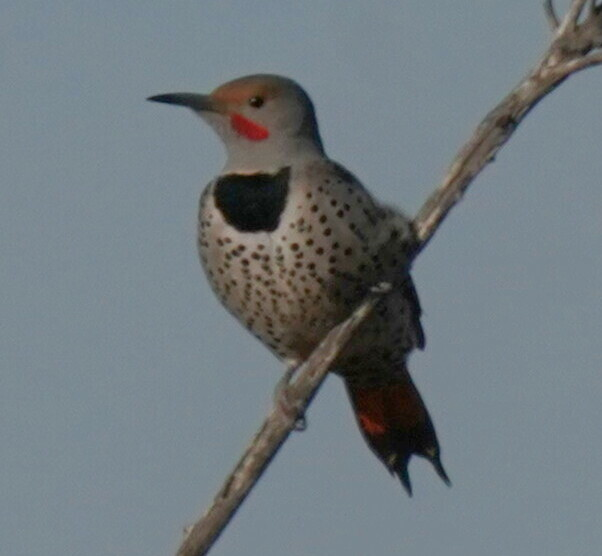
C. a. collaris, in New Mexico

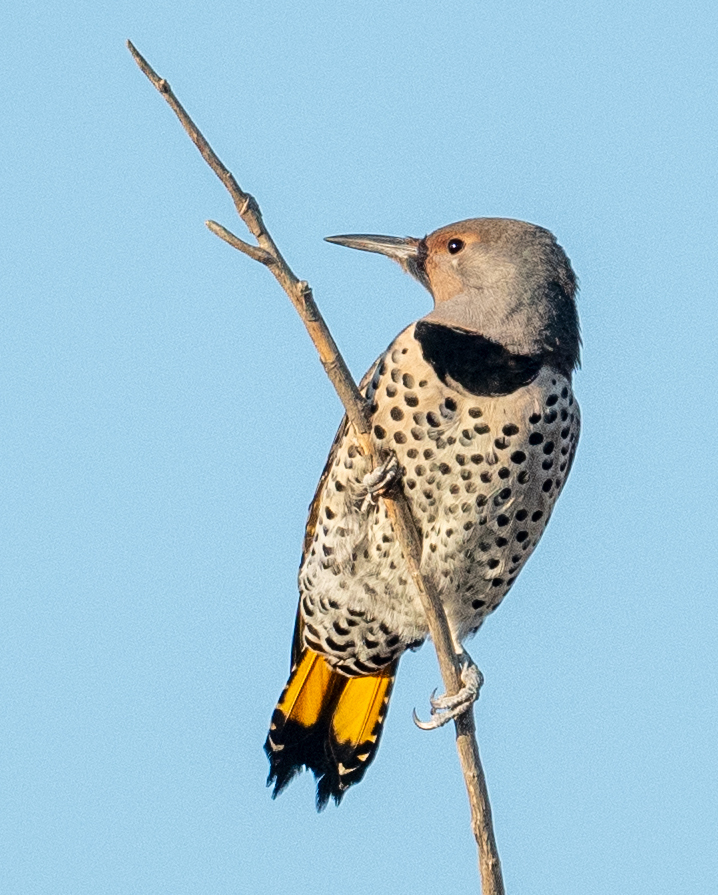
C. a. luteus, in California

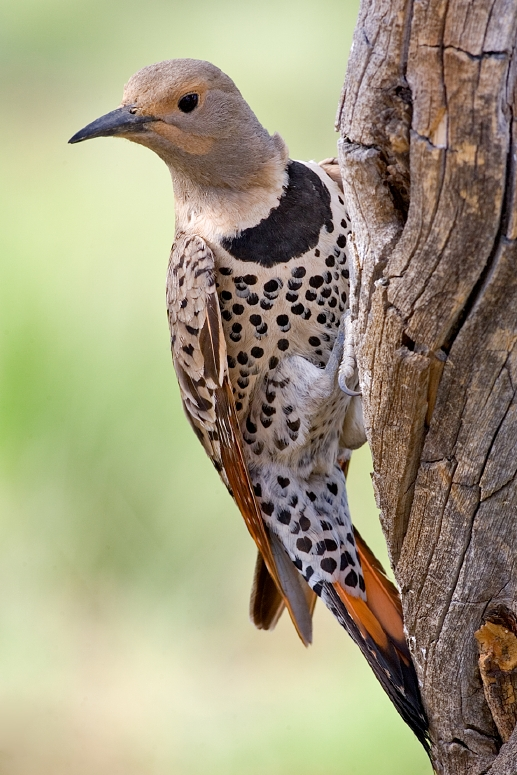
Red-shafted female, in Oregon
