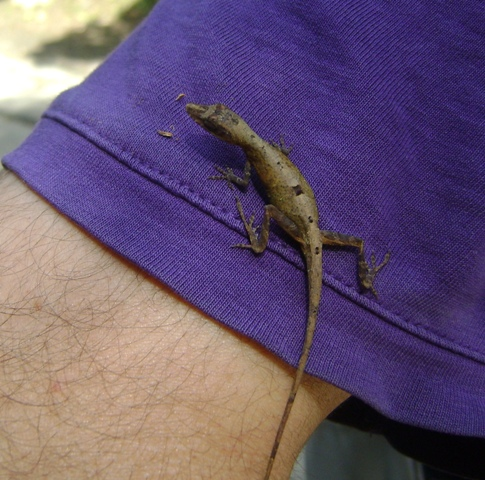

Conservation status
- Least Concern (IUCN 3.1)

Scientific classification
- Kingdom: Animalia
- Phylum: Chordata
- Class: Reptilia
- Order: Squamata
- Suborder: Iguania
- Family: Dactyloidae
- Genus: Anolis
- Species: A. alutaceus

Binomial name
- Anolis alutaceus Cope, 1861

= Anolis alutaceus =

Species of lizard

Anolis alutaceus, the blue-eyed grass-bush anole, Monte Verde anole, or blue-eyed twig anole, is a species of lizard in the family Dactyloidae. The species is found on Isla de la Juventud in Cuba.
