= List of tropidophiid species and subspecies =

This is a list of all genera, species and subspecies of the family Tropidophiidae, otherwise referred to as dwarf boas or tropidophiids. It follows the taxonomy currently provided by ITIS, which is based on the continuing work of Dr. Roy McDiarmid.

- Exiliboa, Oaxacan dwarf boa
  - Exiliboa placata, Oaxacan dwarf boa
- Trachyboa, Eyelash boas
  - Trachyboa boulengeri, Northern eyelash boa
  - Trachyboa gularis, Ecuadorian eyelash boa
- Tropidophis, Wood snakes
  - Tropidophis battersbyi, Ecuadorian dwarf boa
  - Tropidophis bucculentus, Navassa Island dwarf boa
  - Tropidophis canus, Bahamian dwarf boa
    - Tropidophis canus androsi, Andros Island dwarf boa
    - Tropidophis canus barbouri, Eastern Bahama Islands dwarf boa
    - Tropidophis canus canus, Great Inagua Island dwarf boa
    - Tropidophis canus curtus, Bimini Island dwarf boa
  - Tropidophis caymanensis, Cayman Islands dwarf boa
    - Tropidophis caymanensis caymanensis, Grand Cayman dwarf boa
    - Tropidophis caymanensis parkeri, Little Cayman dwarf boa
    - Tropidophis caymanensis schwartzi, Cayman Brac Island dwarf boa
  - Tropidophis feicki, Broad-banded dwarf boa
  - Tropidophis fuscus, Cuban dusky dwarf boa
  - Tropidophis greenwayi, Caicos dwarf boa
    - Tropidophis greenwayi greenwayi, Caicos Island dwarf boa
    - Tropidophis greenwayi lanthanus, Ambergris Cay dwarf boa
  - Tropidophis haetianus, Haitian dwarf boa
    - Tropidophis haetianus haetianus, Haitian dwarf boa
    - Tropidophis haetianus hemerus, East Hispaniola dwarf boa
    - Tropidophis haetianus jamaicensis, Southern Jamaican dwarf boa
    - Tropidophis haetianus stejnegeri, Northern Jamaican eyespot dwarf boa
    - Tropidophis haetianus stullae, Portland Ridge dwarf boa
    - Tropidophis haetianus tiburonensis, Tiburon dwarf boa
  - Tropidophis maculatus, Spotted red dwarf boa
  - Tropidophis melanurus, Cuban giant dwarf boa
    - Tropidophis melanurus dysodes, Isla de Pinos dwarf boa
    - Tropidophis melanurus ericksoni, Juventud dwarf boa
    - Tropidophis melanurus melanurus, Cuban black-tailed dwarf boa
  - Tropidophis nigriventris, Black-bellied dwarf boa
    - Tropidophis nigriventris hardyi, Hardy's black-bellied dwarf boa
    - Tropidophis nigriventris nigriventris, Cuban black-bellied dwarf boa
  - Tropidophis pardalis, Leopard dwarf boa
  - Tropidophis paucisquamis, Brazilian dwarf boa
  - Tropidophis pilsbryi, Cuban White-necked dwarf boa
    - Tropidophis pilsbryi galacelidus, Sierra de Trinidad dwarf boa
    - Tropidophis pilsbryi pilsbryi, Pilsbry's dwarf boa
  - Tropidophis semicinctus, Yellow-banded dwarf boa
  - Tropidophis taczanowskyi, Taczanowski's dwarf boa
  - Tropidophis wrighti, Gracile banded
- Ungaliophis, Bromeliad boas
  - Ungaliophis continentalis, Chiapan boa
  - Ungaliophis panamensis, Panamanian dwarf boa
