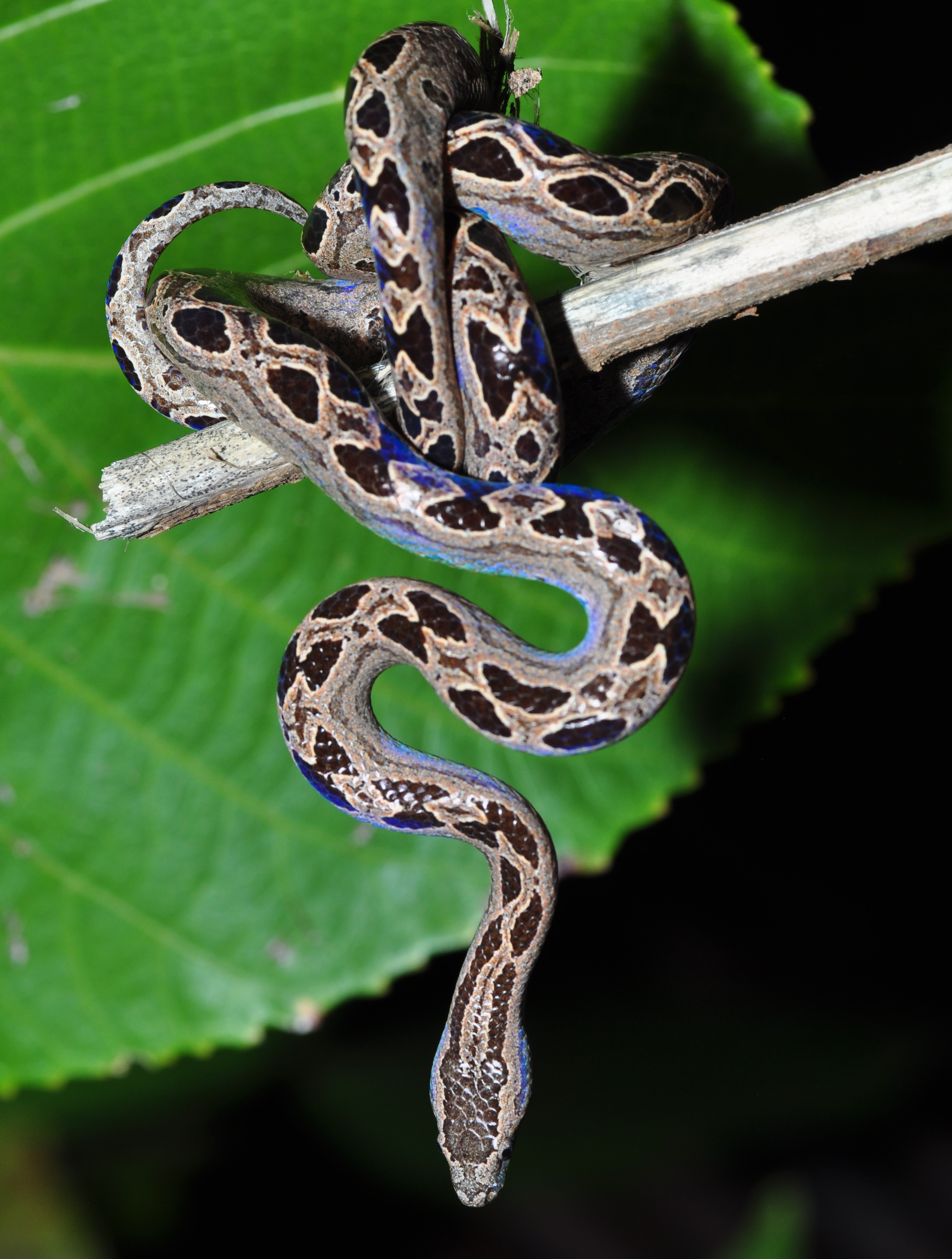
- Panamanian dwarf boa (Ungaliophis panamensis)

Scientific classification
- Domain: Eukaryota
- Kingdom: Animalia
- Phylum: Chordata
- Class: Reptilia
- Order: Squamata
- Suborder: Serpentes
- Family: Boidae
- Subfamily: Ungaliophiinae

Genera
- Ungaliophis; Exiliboa

= Ungaliophiinae =

Subfamily of snakes

Ungaliophiinae is a subfamily of booid snakes containing two genera, Ungaliophis (two species) and Exiliboa (one species). They are small constrictors that are found in Central and South America from southern Mexico to Colombia. They eat mostly lizards and frogs and have been poorly studied.

These snakes were formerly thought to be closely related to two other genera, Tropidophis and Trachyboa; all four genera were united in the family (Tropidophiidae) based on the presence of a tracheal lung and the absence of a left lung. However, Ungaliophis and Exiliboa are now known to be more closely related to the booids, whereas Tropidophis and Trachyboa are now known to be more closely related to the American pipe snake (Anilius scytale). Within the Booidea, Ungaliophis and Exiliboa are thought to be most closely related to the North American Charina and Lichanura boas.
