= Luis Manuel Díaz Beltrán =

Cuban herpetologist (born 1972)

Luis M. Díaz
- Born: Luis Manuel Díaz Beltrán; 28 July 1972; Cuba
- Education: University of Havana
- Scientific career
- Fields: Herpetology
- Workplaces: Museo Nacional de Historia Natural de Cuba

Luis Manuel Díaz Beltrán, often written as Luis M. Díaz, (born 28 July 1972) is a Cuban herpetologist. He is known for research on the systematics, natural history and conservation of Cuban amphibians and reptiles.

== Biography ==
Díaz studied from 1990 to 1995 at the Universidad de Ciencias Pedagógicas Enrique José Varona. Since 1998, he has served as curator of herpetology at the Museo Nacional de Historia Natural de Cuba (National Museum of Natural History of Cuba). In 2009 he earned his doctorate from the University of Havana.

He has been a visiting researcher at the Royal Ontario Museum in Toronto, the American Museum of Natural History, the Harvard Museum of Comparative Zoology, Pennsylvania State University, Cornell University, the Field Museum of Natural History, the Museo Nacional de Historia Natural de Santo Domingo, and other institutions. Díaz has participated in national and international conferences and meetings in the United States, Italy, Colombia, Bolivia, and the Dominican Republic. He has twice been recognized by the Cuban Academy of Sciences for his contributions to herpetology, and his amphibian guide was selected by the University of Havana as the best natural science book of 2009.

His research has been supported by grants from the WWF, Amphibian Ark, the Linnean Society of London, the Julius Maximilian University of Würzburg, Tohoku University, and the Ministry of Higher Education, Science, and Technology of the Dominican Republic. Díaz is a member of several international expert groups including the Amphibian Specialist Group, the Anolis Specialist Group, and the Iguana Specialist Group of the IUCN. He is also a member of the Society for the Study of Amphibians and Reptiles (SSAR) and the Cuban Society of Zoology. In addition, he has taught introductory courses in herpetology at the Faculty of Biology of the University of Havana.

Díaz has authored or co-authored more than 60 scientific papers on the systematics, natural history, and conservation of Cuban amphibians and reptiles. He is the describer of new species such as Anolis agueroi, Anolis garridoi, Aristelliger reyesi, Tarentola crombiei, Tropidophis celiae, Tropidophis morenoi, and Tropidophis steinleini. In 2008, he published the book Guía Taxonómica de los Anfibios de Cuba, the first comprehensive identification guide to Cuban amphibians.

Díaz is also an avid birdwatcher and has led more than 20 ecotourism groups focusing on the observation of birds, reptiles, and amphibians in Cuba.
