= Tropidophis hendersoni =

Conservation status
- Endangered (IUCN 3.1)
- CITES Appendix II

Scientific classification
- Kingdom: Animalia
- Phylum: Chordata
- Class: Reptilia
- Order: Squamata
- Suborder: Serpentes
- Family: Tropidophiidae
- Genus: Tropidophis
- Species: T. hendersoni

Binomial name
- Tropidophis hendersoni Hedges & Garrido, 2002

Species of snake

Tropidophis hendersoni, commonly known as the Cuban khaki dwarf boa, the Cuban Khaki trope, and Henderson's trope, is a species of snake in the family Tropidophiidae (dwarf boas). The species is endemic to Cuba.

== Etymology ==
The specific name, hendersoni, is in honor of American herpetologist Robert William Henderson (born 1945).

== Geographic range ==
T. hendersoni is known from the northern coast of eastern Cuba, in the province of Holguín.

== Habitat ==
The preferred natural habitat of T. hendersoni is caves and sinkholes in forest, at altitudes from sea level to 20 m (66 ft).

== Description ==
T. hendersoni is a small spotted species, previously confused with T. haetianus of Hispaniola.

== Diet ==
T. hendersoni preys upon frogs of the genus Eleutherodactylus.

== Reproduction ==
T. hendersoni is ovoviviparous.
