= Tropidophis spiritus =

Sancti Spiritus dwarf boa

Conservation status
- Endangered (IUCN 3.1)
- CITES Appendix II

Scientific classification
- Kingdom: Animalia
- Phylum: Chordata
- Class: Reptilia
- Order: Squamata
- Suborder: Serpentes
- Family: Tropidophiidae
- Genus: Tropidophis
- Species: T. spiritus

Binomial name
- Tropidophis spiritus Hedges & Garrido, 1999

Species of snake

Tropidophis spiritus, also known commonly as the Sancti Spiritus dwarf boa and the Sancti Spiritus trope, is a small species of snake in the family Tropidophiidae (dwarf boas). The species is endemic to the province of Sancti Spíritus in central Cuba. It is distinguished from other Tropidophis species by its gracile body shape and color pattern of bold spots.

== Habitat ==
The preferred natural habitat of T. spiritus is forest, at altitudes of 25–800 m (82–2,625 ft).
