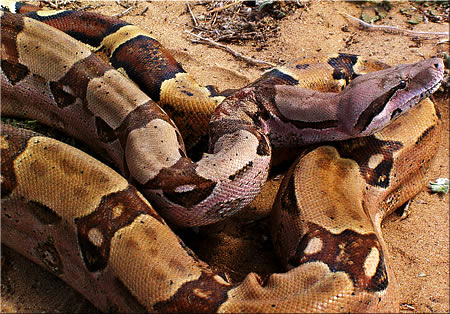

Scientific classification
- Kingdom: Animalia
- Phylum: Chordata
- Class: Reptilia
- Order: Squamata
- Suborder: Serpentes
- Clade: Afrophidia
- Superfamily: Booidea

Families
- Boidae

= Booidea =

Booidea Temporal range: Cretaceous-Recent (Maastrichtian to Holocene), 72.1–0 Ma

Superfamily of snakes

The Booidea, also known as booid snakes, are a superfamily of snakes that contains boas (family Boidae) and other closely related boa-like snakes (but not pythons, which are in a separate superfamily called Pythonoidea). As of 2017, Booidea contains 61 species, including the eponymous neotropical Boa constrictor, anacondas (genus Eunectes), and smaller tree and rainbow boas (Corallus, Epicrates, and Chilabothrus) as well as several genera of booid snakes from various locations around the world: bevel-nosed boas or keel-scaled boas (Candoia) from New Guinea and Melanesia, Old World sand boas (Eryx) from Northeast Africa, the Middle East, and Southwest Asia, rubber boas (Charina) and rosy boas (Lichanura) from North America, neotropical dwarf boas (Ungaliophis) and the Oaxacan dwarf boa (Exiliboa) from Central America, Madagascan boas or Malagasy boas (Acrantophis and Sanzinia) from Madagascar, and the Calabar python (Calabaria) from tropical West-Central Africa.

Many snake biologists choose to recognize at least Calabaria as a member of a separate family (Calabariidae). The taxonomy of boas, pythons, and other henophidian snakes has long been debated, and ultimately the decision whether to assign a particular clade to a particular Linnaean rank (such as a superfamily, family, or subfamily) is arbitrary. The clade name Booidea emphasizes the relatively close evolutionary relationship among these 61 species, which last shared a common ancestor about 68 [CI:49–73] million years ago, in contrast to the more distant relationship between booids and their next closest relatives, pythonoids and uropeltoids (the most recent common ancestor between booids and these other snakes lived ~79 [CI:65–93] million years ago).
