= Tropidophis morenoi =

Conservation status
- Vulnerable (IUCN 3.1)
- CITES Appendix II

Scientific classification
- Kingdom: Animalia
- Phylum: Chordata
- Class: Reptilia
- Order: Squamata
- Suborder: Serpentes
- Family: Tropidophiidae
- Genus: Tropidophis
- Species: T. morenoi

Binomial name
- Tropidophis morenoi Hedges, Garrido & Díaz, 2001

Species of snake

Tropidophis morenoi, also commonly known as the zebra dwarf boa and the zebra trope, is a species of snake in the family Tropidophiidae. The species is endemic to Cuba.

== Etymology ==
The specific name, morenoi, is in honor of Cuban herpetologist Luis V. Moreno.

== Geographic distribution ==
Tropidophis morenoi is found in north-central Cuba, in the provinces of Ciego de Ávila, Sancti Spíritus, and Villa Clara.

== Habitat ==
The preferred natural habitat of Tropidophis morenoi is forest, at altitudes from sea level to 25 m (82 ft).

== Description ==
Tropidophis morenoi is distinguished from other Tropidophis species by its buff ground color, with brown spots fused to form zebra-like bands. The longest specimen measured is a female with a snout-to-vent length (SVL) of 35.9 cm (14.1 in) and a tail length of 5.7 cm (2.2 in).

== Reproduction ==
Tropidophis morenoi is viviparous.
