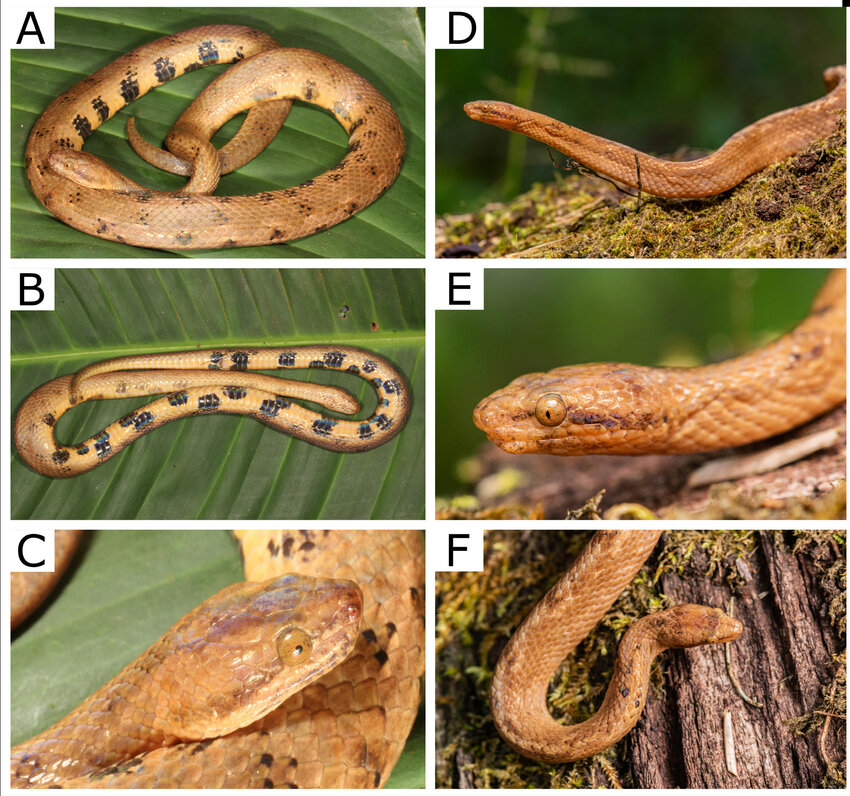
- A-C. ♂ holotype, D-F. ♀ paratype

Scientific classification
- Kingdom: Animalia
- Phylum: Chordata
- Class: Reptilia
- Order: Squamata
- Suborder: Serpentes
- Family: Tropidophiidae
- Genus: Tropidophis
- Species: T. cacuangoae

Binomial name
- Tropidophis cacuangoae Ortega-Andrade, Bentley, Koch, Yánez-Muñoz and Entiauspe-Neto, 2022

= Tropidophis cacuangoae =

Snake species discovered in 2023

Tropidophis cacuangoae is a dwarf boa species in the genus Tropidophis, described in 2022.

== Description ==
T. cacuangoae usually grows to a length of 20 centimeters. These snakes have a skin coloring similar to those of the boa constrictor.

== Distribution and habitat ==
The snakes are endemic to South America, more precisely in Ecuador.

== Discovery ==
The species was discovered in 2022 in Ecuadorian Amazon by multi-organization researchers that included Mauricio Ortega Andrade, Alexander Bentley, Claudia Koch, Mario Yánez-Muñoz and Omar Entiauspe Neto. Two specimens were found in the Colonso Chalupas national reserve and in the private Sumak kawsay park, the discoverers reported. The specific epithet honors early 20th century indigenous rights activist Dolores Cacuango.
