= Guanahacabibes =

Guanahacabibes is a word of Taíno origin, and may refer to the following places in Cuba:

- Guanahacabibes Peninsula, a peninsula in the western extremity of Cuba
  - Gulf of Guanahacabibes, a gulf north of the peninsula
  - Guanahacabibes Biosphere Reserve, a protected area on the peninsula

== See also ==
- Eleutherodactylus guanahacabibes, a species of frog in the family Eleutherodactylidae, named for the Guanahacabibes Peninsula
- Guanahacabibes dwarf boa (Tropidophis xanthogaster), a species of snake endemic to the Guanahacabibes Peninsula
