= Tropidophis xanthogaster =

Guanahacabibes dwarf boa

Conservation status
- Least Concern (IUCN 3.1)
- CITES Appendix II

Scientific classification
- Kingdom: Animalia
- Phylum: Chordata
- Class: Reptilia
- Order: Squamata
- Suborder: Serpentes
- Family: Tropidophiidae
- Genus: Tropidophis
- Species: T. xanthogaster

Binomial name
- Tropidophis xanthogaster Domínguez, Moreno & Hedges, 2006

Species of snake

Tropidophis xanthogaster, also known commonly as the Guanahacabibes dwarf boa and the Guanahacabibes trope, is a species of snake in the family Tropidophiidae (dwarf boas). The species is endemic to the Guanahacabibes Peninsula, in the province of Pinar del Río, western Cuba.

== Etymology ==
The specific name, xanthogaster, from Greek xantho- (yellow) and gaster (venter), refers to the yellow underside of this species.

== Habitat ==
The preferred natural habitat of T. xanthogaster is a forest with shaded rocky areas and caves, at elevations up to 25 m (82 ft).

== Description ==
Dorsally, T. xanthogaster is grayish-brown with eight rows of dark brown spots. Ventrally, it is yellow. It may attain a snout-to-vent length (SVL) of about 24 cm (9.4 in).

== Reproduction ==
T. xanthogaster is ovoviviparous.
