= Tropidophis nigriventris =

Conservation status
- Endangered (IUCN 3.1)
- CITES Appendix II

Scientific classification
- Kingdom: Animalia
- Phylum: Chordata
- Class: Reptilia
- Order: Squamata
- Suborder: Serpentes
- Family: Tropidophiidae
- Genus: Tropidophis
- Species: T. nigriventis

Binomial name
- Tropidophis nigriventis Bailey, 1937

Species of snake

Tropidophis nigriventis, or the black-bellied dwarf boa, is a species of snake in the family Tropidophiidae. The species is endemic to Cuba.

== Geographic range ==
T. nigriventris is found in central Cuba in Camagüey Province.
