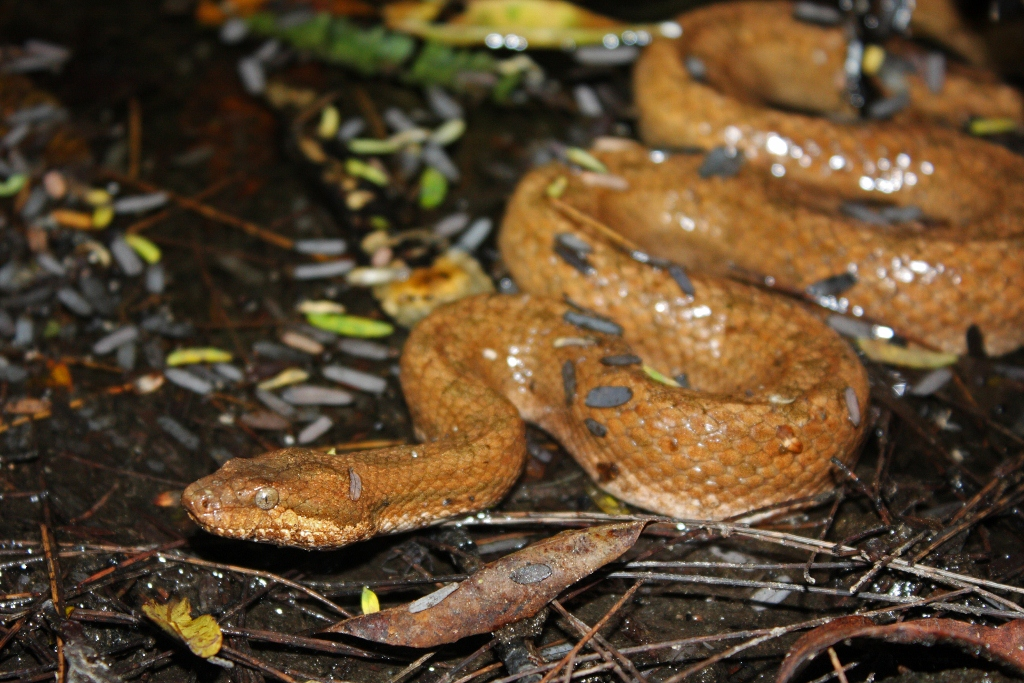

Conservation status
- Least Concern (IUCN 3.1)
- CITES Appendix II

Scientific classification
- Kingdom: Animalia
- Phylum: Chordata
- Class: Reptilia
- Order: Squamata
- Suborder: Serpentes
- Family: Tropidophiidae
- Genus: Tropidophis
- Species: T. melanurus

Binomial name
- Tropidophis melanurus (Schlegel, 1837)

Synonyms
- Boa melanura Schlegel, 1837; Tropidophis melanurus — Bibron In de la Sagra, 1840; Notophis bicarinatus Hallowell, 1856; Ungalia melanura — Cope, 1868; Ungalia melanura — Boulenger, 1893; Tropidophis melanurus melanurus — Schwartz & Thomas, 1960

= Tropidophis melanurus =

Species of snake

Tropidophis melanurus, commonly known as the dusky dwarf boa, Cuban wood snake, or Cuban giant dwarf boa, is a nonvenomous dwarf boa species endemic to Cuba. There are three subspecies that are recognized as being valid, including the nominate subspecies described here.

== Description ==
Adults of T. melanurus grow to an average of 32 to 39 inches (81 to 99 cm) in total length (including tail).

== Geographic range ==
T. melanurus is found in Cuba, as well as on some nearby islands, Cayos de San Felipe (Cayo Real), and Isla de la Juventud. The type locality given is "l'île de Cuba."

== Habitat ==
The preferred natural habitat of T. melanurus is forest.

== Diet ==
T. melanurus preys upon amphibians (frogs), reptiles (lizards), birds, and mammals (rodents).

== Reproduction ==
The mode of reproduction of T. melanurus is unclear: it has been described as oviparous, and as ovoviviparous.

== Subspecies ==
Subspecies	Taxon author	Common name	Geographic range
Tropidophis melanurus dysodes	Schwartz & Thomas, 1960		Type locality: "one km N. of La Coloma, Pinar del Río Province, Cuba.
Tropidophis melanurus ericksoni	Schwartz & Thomas, 1960		Type locality: "Bibijagua, Isla de Piños, Habana Province, Cuba."
Tropidophis melanurus melanurus	(Schlegel, 1837)		Type locality: "l'île de Cuba."

== Etymology ==
The subspecific name, ericksoni, is in honor of Edwin B. Erickson who assisted Schwartz in fieldwork in 1957.
