= Tropidophis paucisquamis =

Conservation status
- Least Concern (IUCN 3.1)
- CITES Appendix II

Scientific classification
- Kingdom: Animalia
- Phylum: Chordata
- Class: Reptilia
- Order: Squamata
- Suborder: Serpentes
- Family: Tropidophiidae
- Genus: Tropidophis
- Species: T. paucisquamis

Binomial name
- Tropidophis paucisquamis (F. Müller, 1901)

Synonyms
- Ungalia paucisquamis F. Müller in Schenkel, 1901; Tropidophis paucisquamis — Stull, 1928

Species of snake

Tropidophis paucisquamis, or the Brazilian dwarf boa, is a species of snake in the family Tropidophiidae. The species is endemic to Brazil.
