= Tropidophis pardalis =

Conservation status
- Least Concern (IUCN 3.1)
- CITES Appendix II

Scientific classification
- Kingdom: Animalia
- Phylum: Chordata
- Class: Reptilia
- Order: Squamata
- Suborder: Serpentes
- Family: Tropidophiidae
- Genus: Tropidophis
- Species: T. pardalis

Binomial name
- Tropidophis pardalis (Gundlach, 1840)

Synonyms
- Boa pardalis Gundlach, 1840; Ungalia pardalis — Boulenger, 1893; Tropidophis pardalis — Brongersma, 1951

Species of snake

Tropidophis pardalis, also known commonly as the leopard dwarf boa and the spotted brown trope, is a species of snake in the family Tropidophiidae. The species is endemic to Cuba.
