= Tropidophis maculatus =

Conservation status
- Least Concern (IUCN 3.1)
- CITES Appendix II

Scientific classification
- Kingdom: Animalia
- Phylum: Chordata
- Class: Reptilia
- Order: Squamata
- Suborder: Serpentes
- Family: Tropidophiidae
- Genus: Tropidophis
- Species: T. maculatus

Binomial name
- Tropidophis maculatus (Bibron, 1840)

Synonyms
- Leionotus maculatus Bibron, 1840; Tropidophis maculatus — A.M.C. Duméril & Bibron, 1844; Tropidophis distinctus Jan, 1863; Ungalia dipsidina Cope, 1868; Tropidophis maculatus maculatus — Bailey, 1937

Species of snake

Tropidophis maculatus, or the spotted red dwarf boa, is a species of snake in the family Tropidophiidae. The species is endemic to Cuba.
