= Reyes's Caribbean gecko =

Conservation status
- Critically Endangered (IUCN 3.1)

Scientific classification
- Kingdom: Animalia
- Phylum: Chordata
- Class: Reptilia
- Order: Squamata
- Suborder: Gekkota
- Family: Sphaerodactylidae
- Genus: Aristelliger
- Species: A. reyesi

Binomial name
- Aristelliger reyesi Díaz & Hedges, 2009

Species of lizard

Reyes's Caribbean gecko (Aristelliger reyesi) is a species of lizard in the family Sphaerodactylidae. The species is endemic to Cuba.

== Etymology ==
The specific name, reyesi, is in honor of Cuban photographer Ernesto Reyes who discovered this species.

== Geographic range ==
A. reyesi is known only from the Hicacos Peninsula in Matanzas Province, Cuba.

== Description ==
A. reyesi may attain a snout-to-vent length (SVL) of 6.36 cm (2.50 in).
