= Tropidophis pilsbryi =

Conservation status
- Vulnerable (IUCN 3.1)
- CITES Appendix II

Scientific classification
- Kingdom: Animalia
- Phylum: Chordata
- Class: Reptilia
- Order: Squamata
- Suborder: Serpentes
- Family: Tropidophiidae
- Genus: Tropidophis
- Species: T. pilsbryi

Binomial name
- Tropidophis pilsbryi Bailey, 1937

Synonyms
- Tropidophis maculatus pilsbryi Bailey, 1937; Tropidophis pilsbryi — Schwartz & Henderson, 1991

Species of snake

Tropidophis pilsbryi, commonly known as Pilsbry's dwarf boa or the Cuban white-necked dwarf boa, is a species of snake in the family Tropidophiidae. The species is endemic to Cuba.

== Etymology ==
Both the specific name, pilsbryi, and one of the common names, Pilsbry's dwarf boa, are in honor of American malacologist Henry Augustus Pilsbry.

== Subspecies ==
Two subspecies have been traditionally recognised, but Reptile Database and the IUCN now recognise Tropidophis galacelidus as a species.

- Tropidophis pilsbryi pilsbryi Bailey, 1937 – eastern Cuba
- Tropidophis pilsbryi galacelidus Schwartz & Garrido, 1975 – central Cuba

== Taxonomy ==
In 2002 Hedges elevated the subspecies T. p. galacelidus to a full species, T. galacelidus.

== Description ==
Males of T. p. pilsbryi grow to a snout–vent length (SVL) of 295 mm (11.6 in), and females grow to 260 mm (10 in) SVL. T. p. galacelidus can get larger, with a snout–vent length of 187 mm (7.4 in) in males, but 405 mm (15.9 in) SVL in females.

== Reproduction ==
T. pilsbryi is viviparous.
