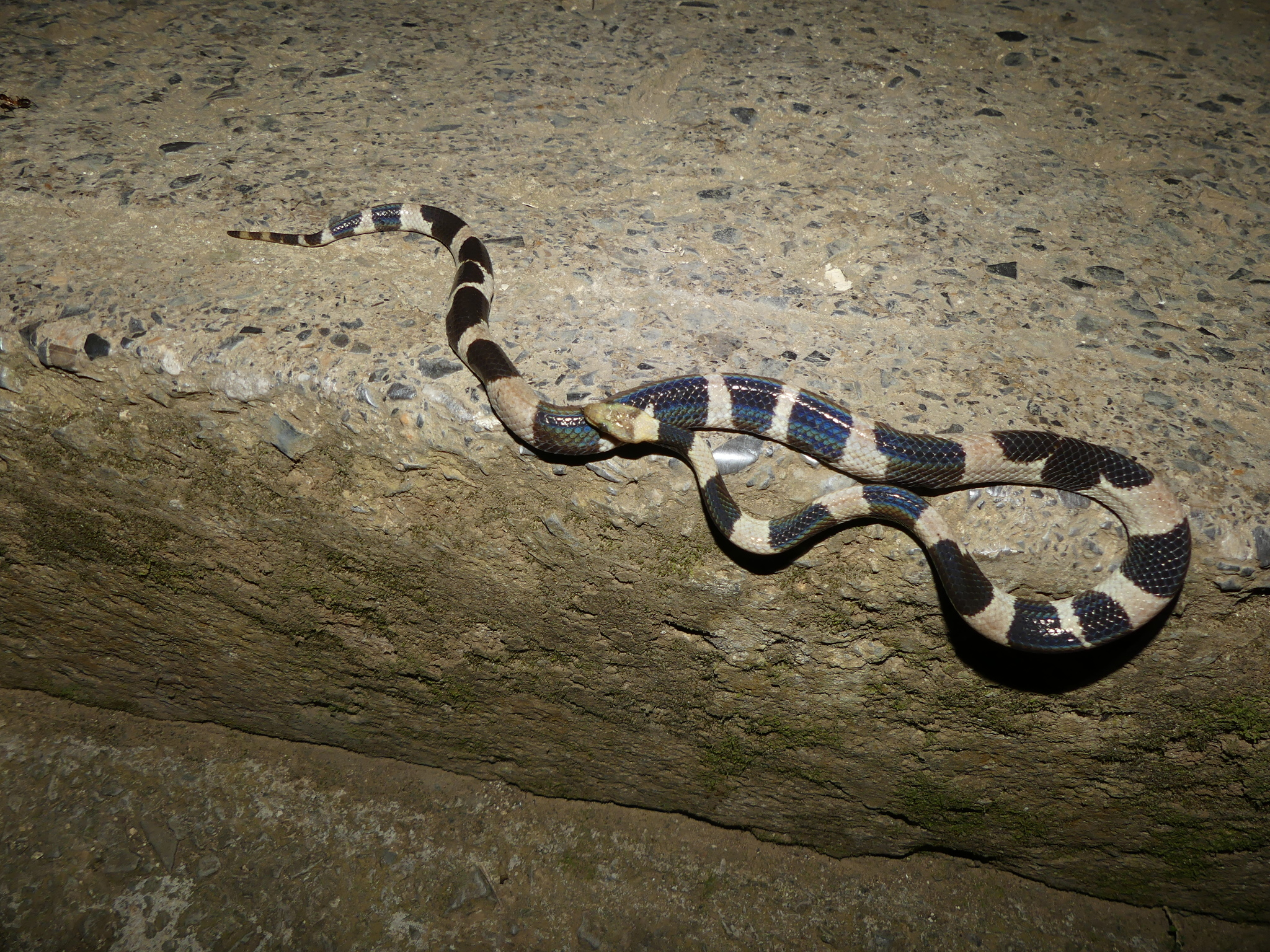

Conservation status
- Near Threatened (IUCN 3.1)
- CITES Appendix II

Scientific classification
- Kingdom: Animalia
- Phylum: Chordata
- Class: Reptilia
- Order: Squamata
- Suborder: Serpentes
- Family: Tropidophiidae
- Genus: Tropidophis
- Species: T. feicki

Binomial name
- Tropidophis feicki Schwartz, 1957

= Tropidophis feicki =

Species of snake

Tropidophis feicki, also known commonly as the broad-banded dwarf boa, the broad-banded trope, and Feick's dwarf boa, is a species of non-venomous snake in the family Tropidophiidae. The species is endemic to Cuba.

== Etymology ==
The specific name, feicki, is in honor of American biologist John R. Feick.

== Description ==
T. feicki males can grow to 41 cm (16 in) snout-to-vent length (SVL), and females to 45 cm (18 in) SVL. There are 217–235 ventral scales and 34–41 subcaudal scales. The dorsal ground color is grey or pink. There is a saddle pattern dorsally, but no ventral pattern.

== Geographic range ==
T. feicki is found in western Cuba, from Pedrera de Mendoza and Guane, Pinar del Río Province, east to Pan de Matanzas, Matanzas Province.

== Habitat ==
The preferred habitat of T. feicki is rocky areas such as upland caves, cliffs, and talus deposits, within forest, at altitudes from sea level to 400 m (1,300 ft).

== Behavior ==
T. feicki is arboreal.

== Diet ==
T. feicki preys upon small species of lizards.

== Reproduction ==
T. feicki is viviparous.
