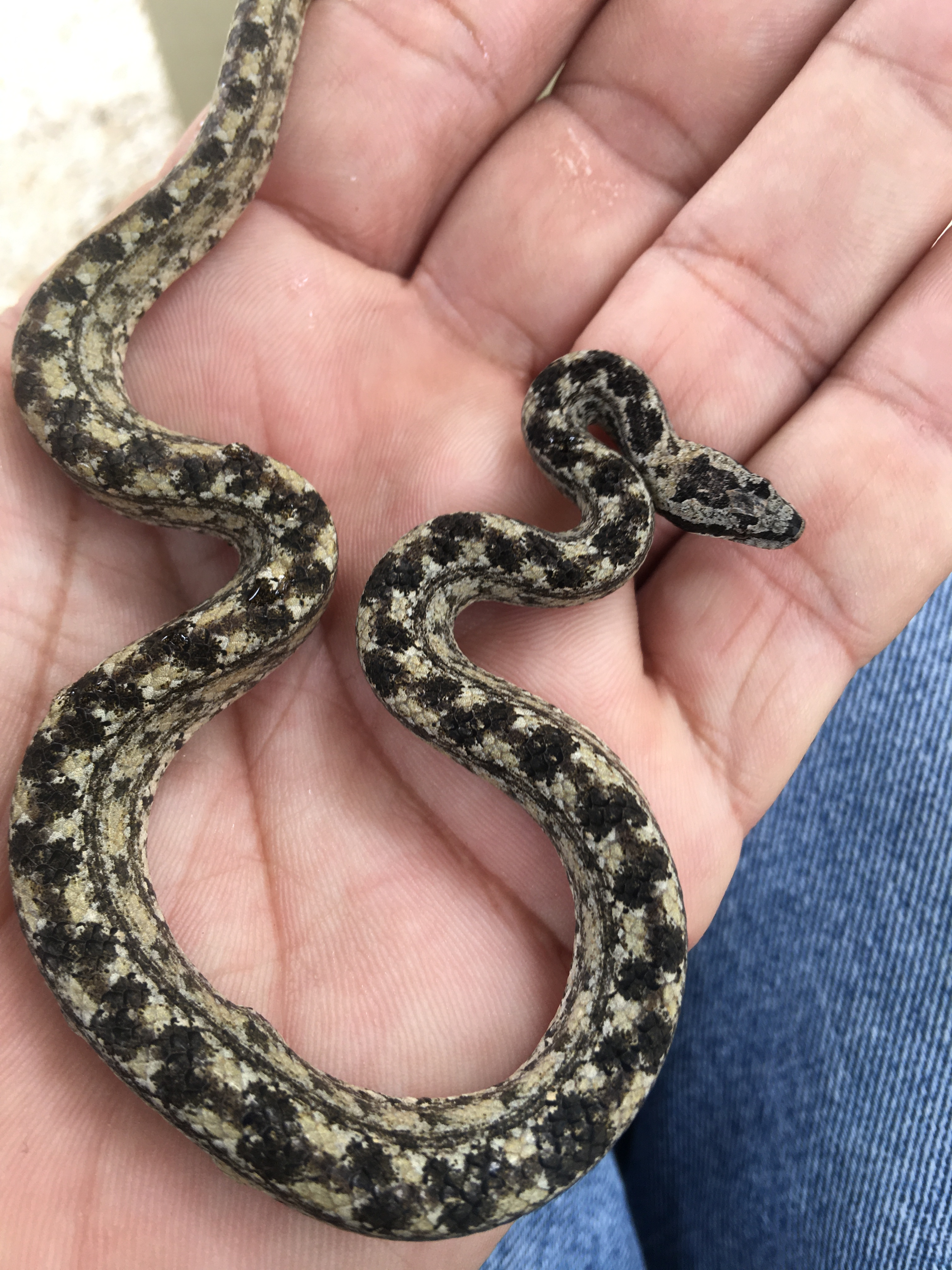

Conservation status
- Critically Endangered (IUCN 3.1)
- CITES Appendix II

Scientific classification
- Kingdom: Animalia
- Phylum: Chordata
- Class: Reptilia
- Order: Squamata
- Suborder: Serpentes
- Family: Tropidophiidae
- Genus: Tropidophis
- Species: T. caymanensis

Binomial name
- Tropidophis caymanensis Battersby, 1938

= Tropidophis caymanensis =

Species of snake

Tropidophis caymanensis, or the Cayman Islands dwarf boa, is a species of snake in the family Tropidophiidae and is classified as critically endangered. It is endemic to the Cayman Islands.
