= Ungaliophis continentalis =

Conservation status
- Endangered (IUCN 3.1)
- CITES Appendix II

Scientific classification
- Kingdom: Animalia
- Phylum: Chordata
- Class: Reptilia
- Order: Squamata
- Suborder: Serpentes
- Family: Boidae
- Genus: Ungaliophis
- Species: U. continentalis

Binomial name
- Ungaliophis continentalis Müller, 1880

Species of snake

Ungaliophis continentalis, or the Chiapan boa, is a species of nonvenomous snake in the family Tropidophiidae. It is endemic to Mexico, Guatemala, and Honduras.
