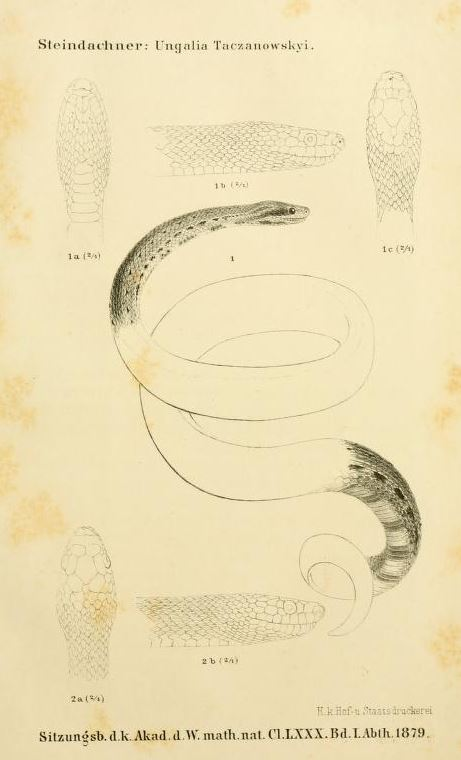
- Original illustration, from Steindachner, 1880.

Conservation status
- Near Threatened (IUCN 3.1)
- CITES Appendix II

Scientific classification
- Kingdom: Animalia
- Phylum: Chordata
- Class: Reptilia
- Order: Squamata
- Suborder: Serpentes
- Family: Tropidophiidae
- Genus: Tropidophis
- Species: T. taczanowskyi

Binomial name
- Tropidophis taczanowskyi (Steindachner, 1880)

Synonyms
- Ungalia taczanowskyi Steindachner, 1880; Tropidophis taczanowskyi — Stull, 1928

= Tropidophis taczanowskyi =

Species of snake

Tropidophis taczanowskyi, also known commonly as Taczanowski's dwarf boa, is a species of snake in the family Tropidophiidae. The species is native to northern South America.

== Etymology ==
Both the specific name, taczanowskyi, and the common name, Taczanowski's dwarf boa, are in honor of Polish zoologist Władysław Taczanowski.

== Geographic range ==
T. taczanowskyi is found in Ecuador and Peru.

== Habitat ==
The preferred natural habitat of T. taczanowskyi is forest, at altitudes of 823–2,900 m (2,700–9,514 ft).

== Diet ==
Taczanowski's dwarf boa preys upon frogs.

== Reproduction ==
T. taczanowskyi is viviparous.
