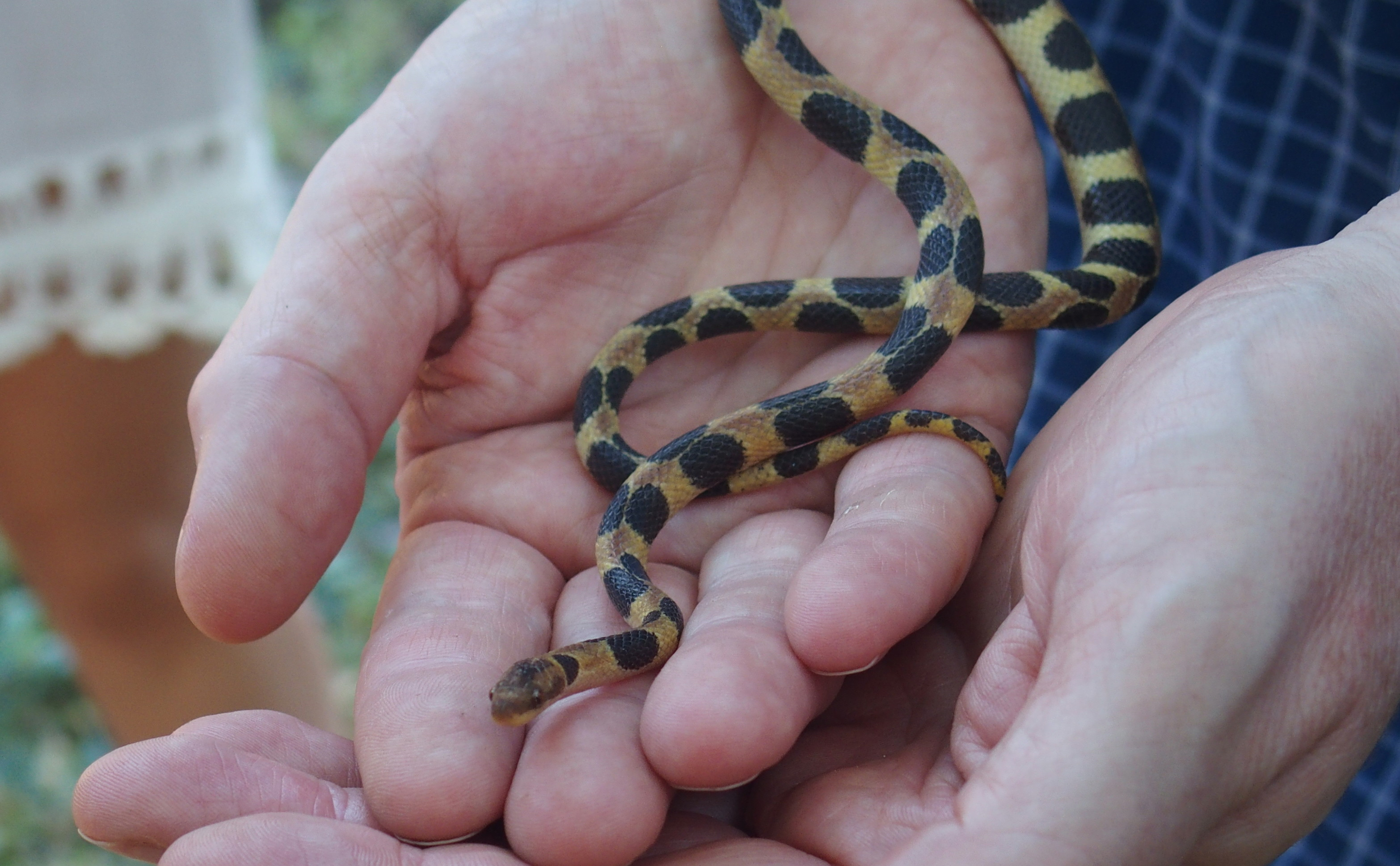

Conservation status
- Least Concern (IUCN 3.1)
- CITES Appendix II

Scientific classification
- Kingdom: Animalia
- Phylum: Chordata
- Class: Reptilia
- Order: Squamata
- Suborder: Serpentes
- Family: Tropidophiidae
- Genus: Tropidophis
- Species: T. semicinctus

Binomial name
- Tropidophis semicinctus (Gundlach & W. Peters, 1864)

= Tropidophis semicinctus =

Species of snake

Tropidophis semicinctus, also known commonly as the banded dwarf boa, the yellow-banded dwarf boa, and the yellow-banded trope, is a species of snake in the family Tropidophiidae. The species is endemic to Cuba.
