= Tropidophis stejnegeri =

Conservation status
- Near Threatened (IUCN 3.1)
- CITES Appendix II

Scientific classification
- Kingdom: Animalia
- Phylum: Chordata
- Class: Reptilia
- Order: Squamata
- Suborder: Serpentes
- Family: Tropidophiidae
- Genus: Tropidophis
- Species: T. stejnegeri

Binomial name
- Tropidophis stejnegeri Grant, 1940

Synonyms
- Tropidophis pardalis stejnegeri Grant, 1940; Tropidophis haetianus stejnegeri — Schwartz & Henderson, 1988; Tropidophis stejnegeri — Hedges, 2002

Subspecies of snake native largely to Northern Jamaica

Tropidophis stejnegeri, also known commonly as Stejneger's dwarf boa and the Jamaican eyespot trope, is a small species of snake in the family Tropidophiidae (dwarf boas). The species is endemic to the northern half of Jamaica.

== Etymology ==
The specific name, stejnegeri, is in honor of Norwegian-born, American herpetologist Leonhard Stejneger.

== Geographic range ==
T. stejnegeri is found in northern Jamaica. The type locality is "Boston Bay, Portland Parish, Jamaica".

== Habitat and ecology ==
This species, T. stejnegeri, is from dry, moist and wet habitats, found under vegetation debris and in bromeliads on the ground or low in trees, and is active at night.

== Threats ==
Threats to the species T. stejnegeri include tourism development and urbanization along the coast, bauxite mining in the Cockpit Country, agricultural development and, presumably, predation by the small Indian mongoose (Urva auropunctata) and feral cats throughout the species' range.

== Conservation ==
The family Tropidophiidae is included in Appendix II of the Convention on International Trade in Endangered Species of Wild Fauna and Flora. The species T. stejnegeri occurs in a number of forest reserves, but these are not effectively managed to prevent ongoing deforestation, and so improving site management is important for the species, as is invasive species control. This species is listed as near threatened on the basis that it has an extent of occurrence of approximately 6,000 sq km (2,317 sq mi) and there is a continuing decline in the extent and quality of its habitat, however, it does not quite qualify for listing as vulnerable under criterion B on the basis that the population is not thought to be severely fragmented and the species is not thought to occur at fewer than 10 locations.
