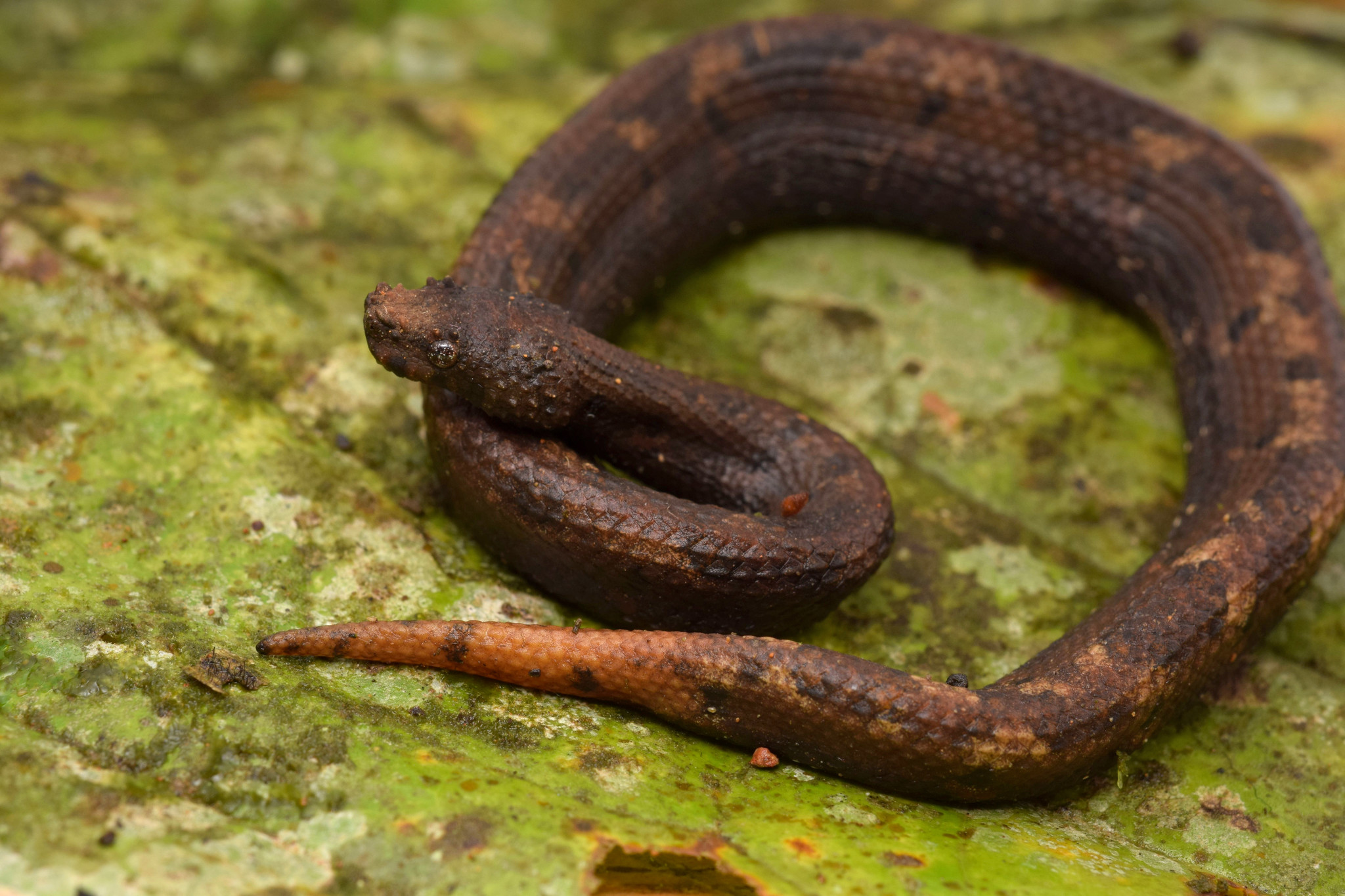
- Trachyboa boulengeri

Scientific classification
- Kingdom: Animalia
- Phylum: Chordata
- Class: Reptilia
- Order: Squamata
- Suborder: Serpentes
- Family: Tropidophiidae
- Genus: Trachyboa; W. Peters, 1860

= Trachyboa =

Genus of snakes

Common name: eyelash boas

Trachyboa is a traditional genus of nonvenomous dwarf boas endemic to Central and South America. They are largely terrestrial, fish-eating snakes that inhabit tropical lowlands. Two species have been recognized, although they are now placed in genus Tropidophis by some authorities.

== Distribution and habitat ==
Species of Trachyboa are found in Central and South America in Panama, Pacific Colombia, and Ecuador.

== Species ==
Species	Taxon author	Common name	Geographic range
Trachyboa boulengeri	Peracca, 1910	northern eyelash boa	From Panama in the Chocó region through Pacific Colombia to Ecuador.
Trachyboa gularis^{T}	W. Peters, 1860	Ecuadorian eyelash boa	Ecuador in the dry regions along the coast.

^{T}) Type species.

== Taxonomy ==
While Trachyboa and Tropidophis dwarf boas have been traditionally considered sister taxa, a phylogenetic analysis of Tropidophiidae species found the Trachyboa nested within the Tropidophis species and it was proposed to include all species in Tropidophis.
