= Tropidophis wrighti =

Conservation status
- Least Concern (IUCN 3.1)
- CITES Appendix II

Scientific classification
- Kingdom: Animalia
- Phylum: Chordata
- Class: Reptilia
- Order: Squamata
- Suborder: Serpentes
- Family: Tropidophiidae
- Genus: Tropidophis
- Species: T. wrighti

Binomial name
- Tropidophis wrighti Stull, 1928

Species of snake

Tropidophis wrighti, commonly known as Wright's dwarf boa, the gracile banded dwarf boa, and the gracile banded trope, is a species of snake in the family Tropidophiidae. The species is endemic to Cuba.

== Etymology ==
T. wrighti is named after American botanist and explorer Charles Wright.

== Geographic range ==
T. wrighti is found in eastern Cuba from Céspedes in Camagüey Province eastward to Santiago de Cuba in Santiago de Cuba Province.

== Habitat ==
The preferred natural habitat of T. wrighti is forest, but it also can be found in coffee plantations and near houses.

== Reproduction ==
T. wrighti is viviparous.
