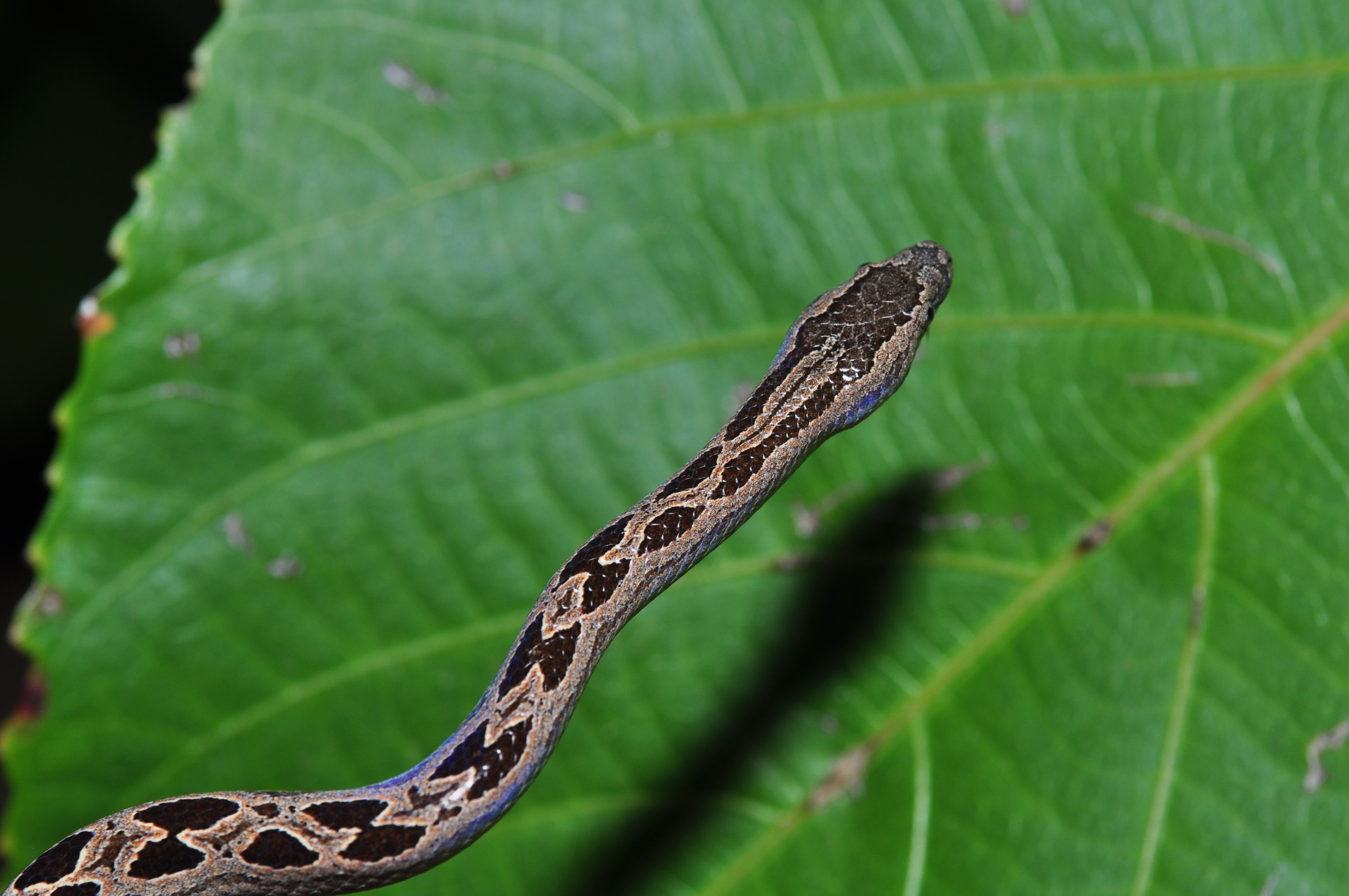

Conservation status
- Least Concern (IUCN 3.1)
- CITES Appendix II

Scientific classification
- Kingdom: Animalia
- Phylum: Chordata
- Class: Reptilia
- Order: Squamata
- Suborder: Serpentes
- Family: Boidae
- Genus: Ungaliophis
- Species: U. panamensis

Binomial name
- Ungaliophis panamensis Schmidt, 1933

= Ungaliophis panamensis =

Species of snake

Ungaliophis panamensis, or the Panamanian dwarf boa, is a species of nonvenomous snake in the family Tropidophiidae. It is native to Nicaragua, Costa Rica, Panama, and Colombia. Adults measure up to 50 cm (20 in) in length, with males being slightly larger but less massive than females. Its diet is not entirely known, but it has been observed feeding on bats, young northern house wrens and yellow-headed geckos.
