= Tropidophis bucculentus =

Conservation status
- Critically endangered, possibly extinct (IUCN 3.1)
- CITES Appendix II

Scientific classification
- Kingdom: Animalia
- Phylum: Chordata
- Class: Reptilia
- Order: Squamata
- Suborder: Serpentes
- Family: Tropidophiidae
- Genus: Tropidophis
- Species: T. bucculentus

Binomial name
- Tropidophis bucculentus (Cope, 1868)

Synonyms
- U[ngalia]. bucculenta Cope, 1868; Tropidophis bucculentus — Bailey, 1937; Tropidophis melanurus bucculentus — Thomas, 1966; Tropidophis bucculentus — Hedges, 2002

Extinct species of snake

Tropidophis bucculentus, also known commonly as the Navassa Island dwarf boa, is a nonvenomous dwarf boa species endemic to Navassa Island in the Caribbean Sea. There are no subspecies that are recognized as being valid.

== Geographic range ==
The type locality given for T. bucculentus is "Navassa Id."

== Description ==
Preserved museum specimens of T. bucculentus indicate that it varied in snout-to-vent length (SVL) from 30–60 cm (0.98–1.97 ft).

== Reproduction ==
T. bucculentus is an ovoviviparous species.

== Conservation status ==
T. bucculentus is possibly extinct. The species became a casualty of human interference and feral predators, such as rats, cats, dogs, and goats that were introduced during the large-scale mining period on this small island during the 1800s.
