= Tropidophis fuscus =

Conservation status
- Endangered (IUCN 3.1)
- CITES Appendix II

Scientific classification
- Kingdom: Animalia
- Phylum: Chordata
- Class: Reptilia
- Order: Squamata
- Suborder: Serpentes
- Family: Tropidophiidae
- Genus: Tropidophis
- Species: T. fuscus

Binomial name
- Tropidophis fuscus Hedges & Garrido, 1992

Species of snake

Common names: Cuban dusky dwarf boa.

Tropidophis fuscus is a nonvenomous dwarf boa species endemic to Cuba. There are no subspecies that are recognized as being valid.

== Description ==
Male T. fuscus grow to 287 mm (11.3 in) and females to 304 mm (12.0 in) in snout–vent length. The color pattern consists of a dark brown ground color with black spotting.

== Geographic range ==
T. fuscus is only found in Cuba, where it is known only from two areas, Cruzata and Minas Amores, in northeastern Guantánamo Province. The type locality given is "Minas Amores (21.7 km NW, 7.7 km SE Baracoa, by road), Guantánamo Province, Cuba, 76 m."

== Habitat ==
The preferred natural habitat of T. fuscus is pine forests.
