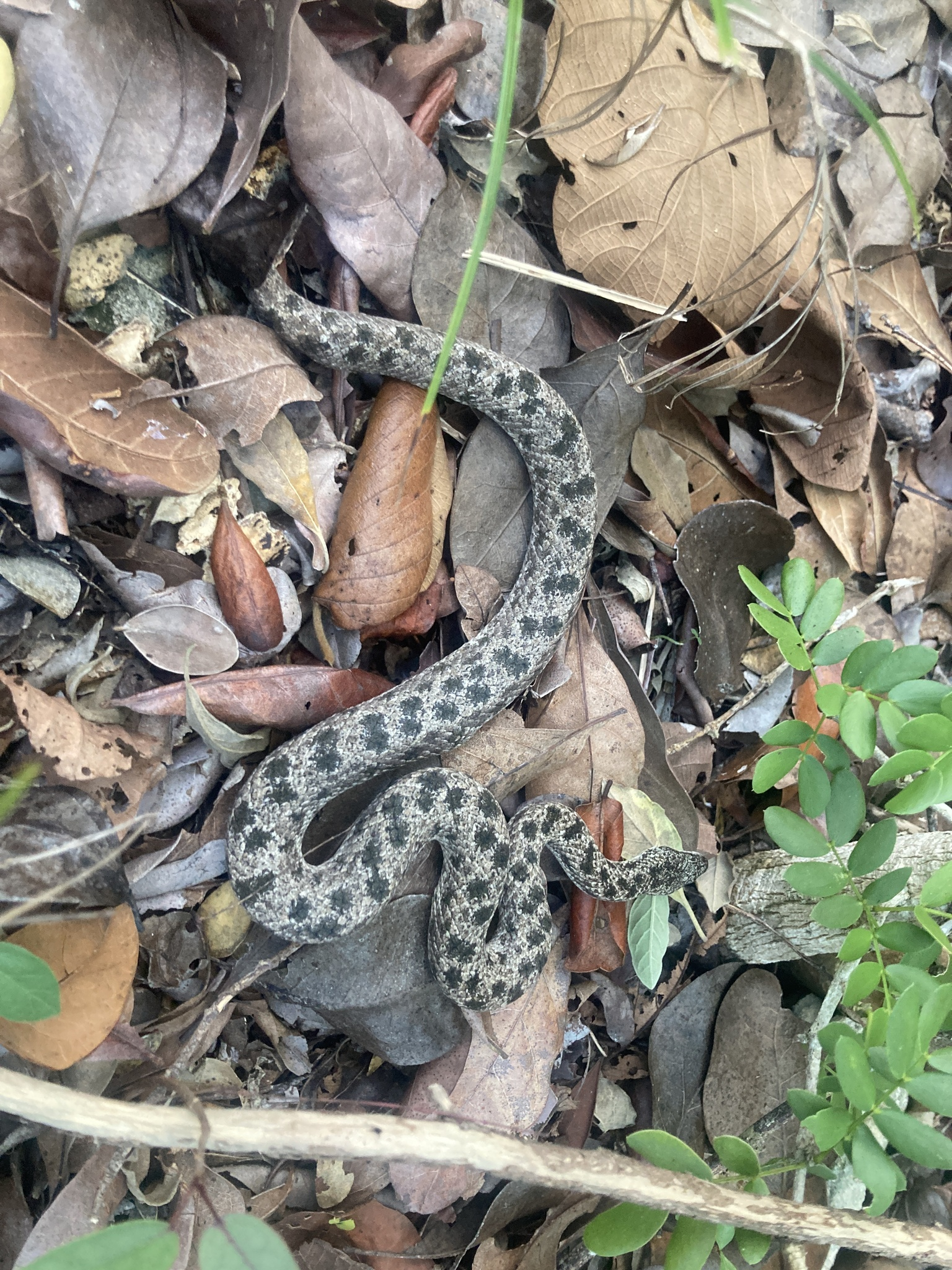

Conservation status
- Vulnerable (IUCN 3.1)
- CITES Appendix II

Scientific classification
- Kingdom: Animalia
- Phylum: Chordata
- Class: Reptilia
- Order: Squamata
- Suborder: Serpentes
- Family: Tropidophiidae
- Genus: Tropidophis
- Species: T. greenwayi

Binomial name
- Tropidophis greenwayi Barbour & Shreve, 1936

Synonyms
- Tropidophis pardalis greenwayi Barbour & Shreve, 1936; Tropidophis greenwayi — Schwartz & Marsh, 1960; Tropidophis greenwayi greenwayi — Schwartz, 1963

= Tropidophis greenwayi =

Species of snake

Common names: Ambergris Cay dwarf boa, Caicos Islands dwarf boa, Caicos trope.

Tropidophis greenwayi is a nonvenomous dwarf boa species endemic to the Caicos Islands. Two subspecies are currently recognized, including the nominate subspecies described here.

== Etymology ==
The specific name, greenwayi, is in honor of American ornithologist James Cowan Greenway.

== Description ==
Adults of T. greenwayi reach maturity at a total length (including tail) of 225 mm (8.9 in) in males and 250–265 mm (9.8–10.4 in) in females. The maximum total length is 38 cm (15 in).

== Geographic range ==
T. greenwayi is found in the West Indies in the Caicos Islands, particularly on the islands of Ambergris Cay, Long Cay, Middle Caicos, Middleton Cay, North Caicos, South Caicos, and probably also on Providenciales. The type locality given is "Ambergris Cay, Caicos Islands, Bahamas".

== Habitat ==
T. greenwayi occurs in the rocky limestone areas of the cays, in shrubland, forest, and rural gardens.

== Conservation ==
Because of its restricted island distribution, T. greenway is susceptible to extirpation. Unless wildlife protection laws are enforced, the relatively secretive nature of this snake may be its only protection against extinction.

== Diet ==
The diet of T. greenwayi consists mainly of anoles, geckos, and frogs.

== Reproduction ==
T. greenwayi is viviparous.

== Subspecies ==
Subspecies	Taxon author	Common name	Geographic range
Tropidophis greenwayi greenwayi	Barbour & Shreve, 1936		Type locality: Ambergris Cay.
Tropidophis greenwayi lanthanus	Schwartz, 1963		Type locality: South Caicos.
