= Tropidophis celiae =

Conservation status
- Endangered (IUCN 3.1)
- CITES Appendix II

Scientific classification
- Kingdom: Animalia
- Phylum: Chordata
- Class: Reptilia
- Order: Squamata
- Suborder: Serpentes
- Family: Tropidophiidae
- Genus: Tropidophis
- Species: T. celiae

Binomial name
- Tropidophis celiae (Hedges, Estrada & Diaz, 1999)

Species of snake

Tropidophis celiae, commonly known as the Canasi dwarf boa or the Canasi trope, is an endangered species of dwarf boa, a snake in the family Tropidophiidae. The species is endemic to Cuba.

== Etymology ==
The specific name, celiae, is in honor of Celia Puerta de Estrada, the wife of Puerto Rican herpetologist Alberto R. Estrada.

== Geographic range ==
T. celiae is native to the northern coast of La Habana Province, western Cuba.

== Habitat ==
The preferred natural habitats of T. celiae are caves, forest, and the marine supralittoral zone at an altitude of 3 m (9.8 ft).

== Description ==
T. celiae is distinguished from other Tropidophis species by its tan coloration, dark brown dorsal spots, and pale neck band.

== Diet ==
T. celiae is known to prey upon frogs.

== Reproduction ==
T. celiae is viviparous.
