= Tropidophis battersbyi =

Conservation status
- Data Deficient (IUCN 3.1)
- CITES Appendix II

Scientific classification
- Kingdom: Animalia
- Phylum: Chordata
- Class: Reptilia
- Order: Squamata
- Suborder: Serpentes
- Family: Tropidophiidae
- Genus: Tropidophis
- Species: T. battersbyi

Binomial name
- Tropidophis battersbyi Laurent, 1949

Species of snake

Tropidophis battersbyi, also known commonly as Battersby's dwarf boa and the Ecuadorian dwarf boa, is a species of snake in the family Tropidophiidae. The species is endemic to Ecuador.

== Etymology ==
The specific name, battersbyi, is in honor of British herpetologist James Clarence Battersby (1901–1993).

== Description ==
Dorsally, T. battersbyi has four rows of large dark spots. It has a high number of ventral scales, up to 200. It has a low number of maxillary teeth, only 12.

== Reproduction ==
T. battersbyi is viviparous.
