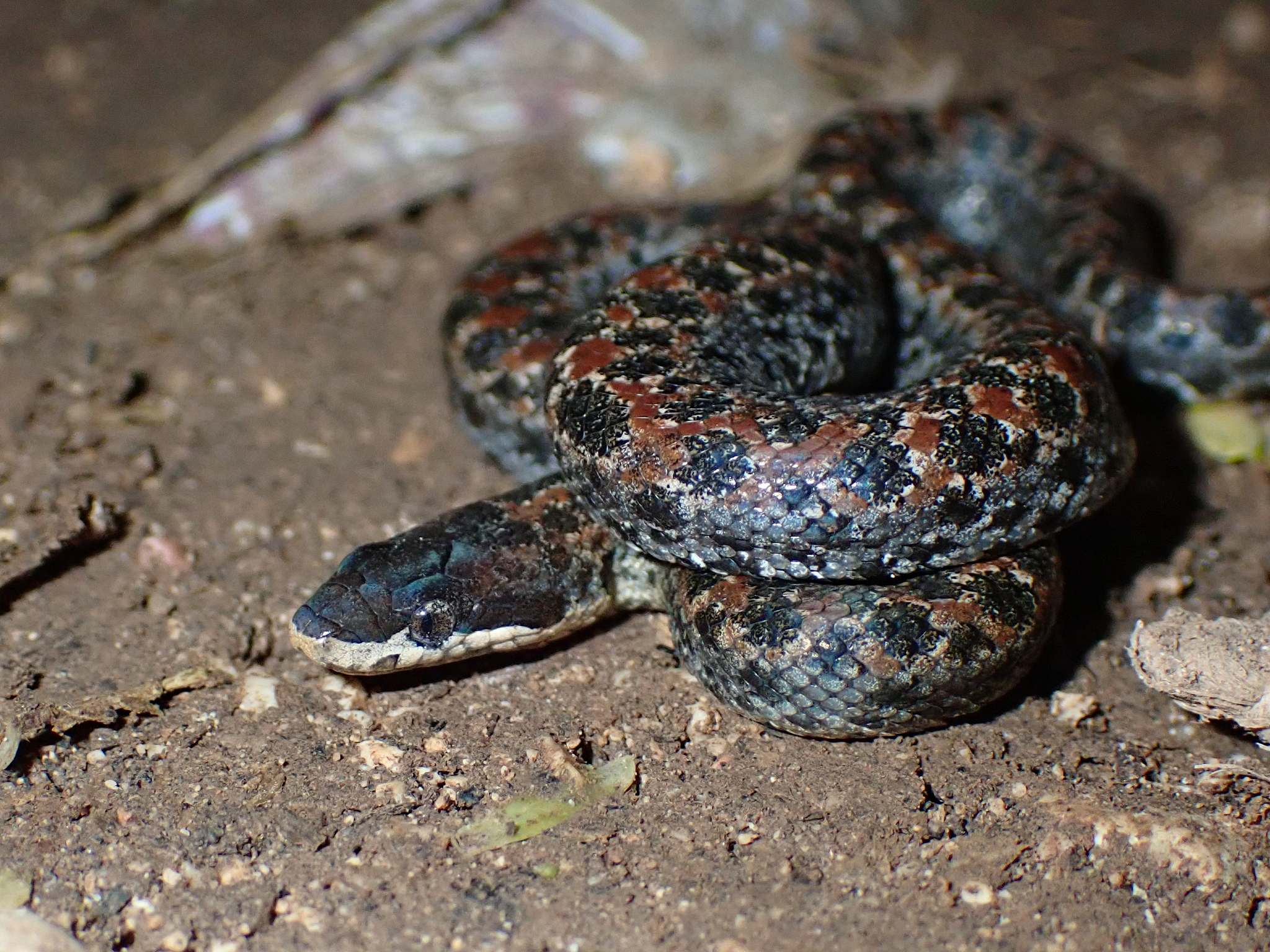
- Tropidophis haetianus ssp. haetianus

Conservation status
- Near Threatened (IUCN 3.1)
- CITES Appendix II

Scientific classification
- Kingdom: Animalia
- Phylum: Chordata
- Class: Reptilia
- Order: Squamata
- Suborder: Serpentes
- Family: Tropidophiidae
- Genus: Tropidophis
- Species: T. haetianus

Binomial name
- Tropidophis haetianus (Cope, 1879)

Synonyms
- Ungualia [sic] haetiana Cope, 1879; Tropidophis conjunctus Fischer, 1888; Ungalia conjuncta — Boulenger, 1893; Tropidophis maculata haetiana — Cochran, 1924; Tropidophis maculatus haetianus — Bailey, 1937; Tropidophis haetianus — Schwartz & Henderson, 1991

= Tropidophis haetianus =

Species of snake

Tropidophis haetianus, the Haitian dwarf boa, is a species of snake in the family Tropidophiidae. The species is endemic to the island of Hispaniola (Dominican Republic and Haiti) in the West Indies.
