= Museo Nacional de Historia Natural Cubana =

Coordinates: 23°8′24.8″N 82°21′25.9″W

Museo Nacional de Historia Natural de Cuba
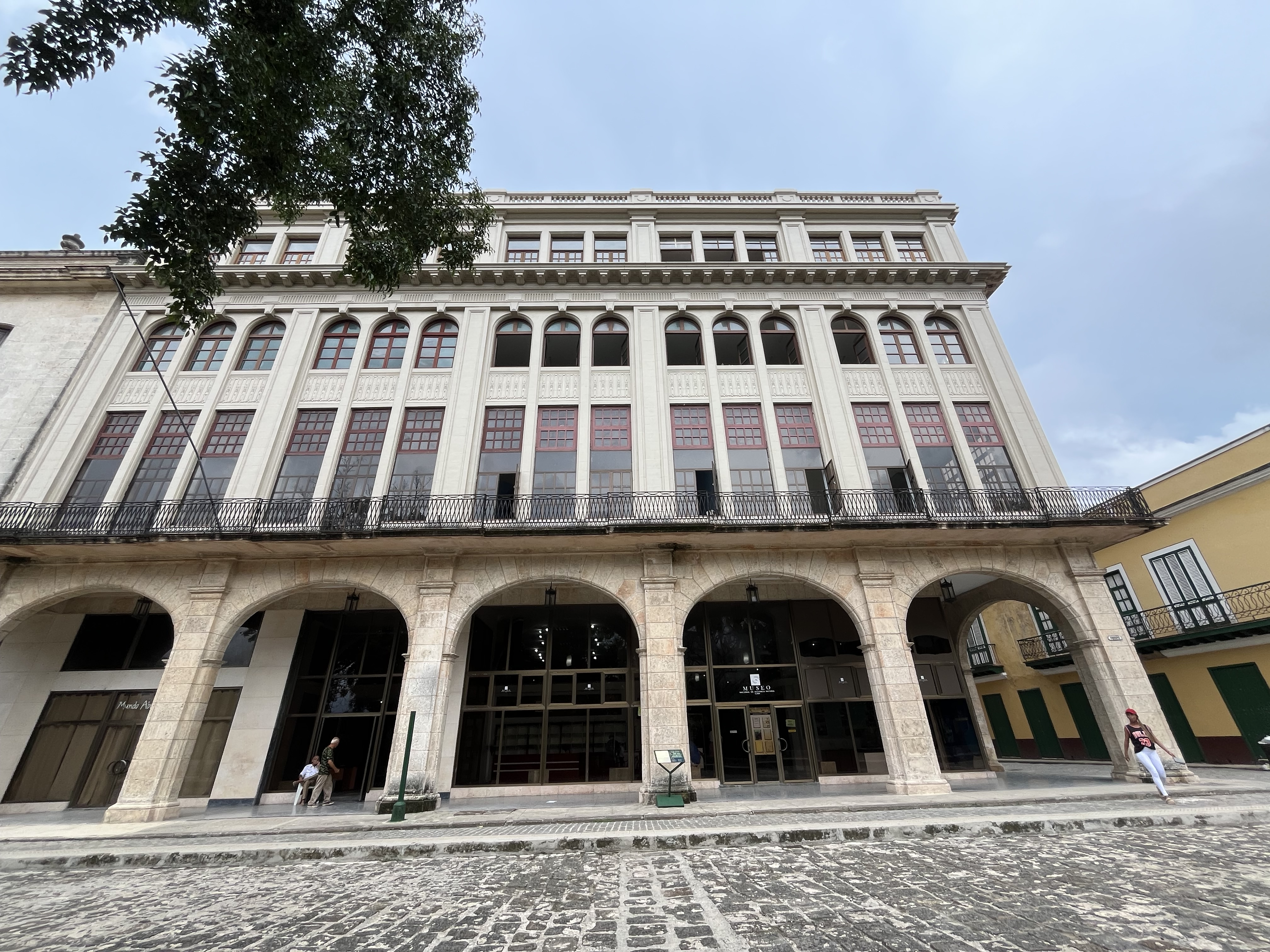
- Location: Havana, Cuba
- Type: Natural History Museum
- Website: www.mnhnc.inf.cu

The Museo Nacional de Historia Natural Cubana or Museo Nacional de Historia Natural de Cuba in Havana, Cuba is the national museum of Natural History, with exhibits of Cuba's plants and animals. It is located in a former U.S. embassy building.

== History ==
The museum has origins going back before the Cuban revolution. The Museo Cubana de Ciencias Naturales existed from 1959 to 1961, and became El Museo de Ciencias 'Felipe Poey' in 1962-1980, named for Cuban zoologist Felipe Poey (1799-1891). The exhibitions were open to the public for the first time in 1964-1980. In the period 1980-1984 the museum had financial problems, but has since undergone major restructuring, first under the Ministry of Culture and, since 1992, under the Ministry of Science, Technology and Environment.

In November 2016, the American Museum of Natural History presented the exhibit "¡Cuba!", created in collaboration with the MNHNC and featuring unique anthropological acquisitions, video, collected specimens, and live animals that are endemic to the environment of Cuba. The exhibit is considered one of the largest displays of Cuban natural history ever seen in the United States and is the first fully bilingual exhibit at AMNH.

== See also ==
- List of museums in Cuba
