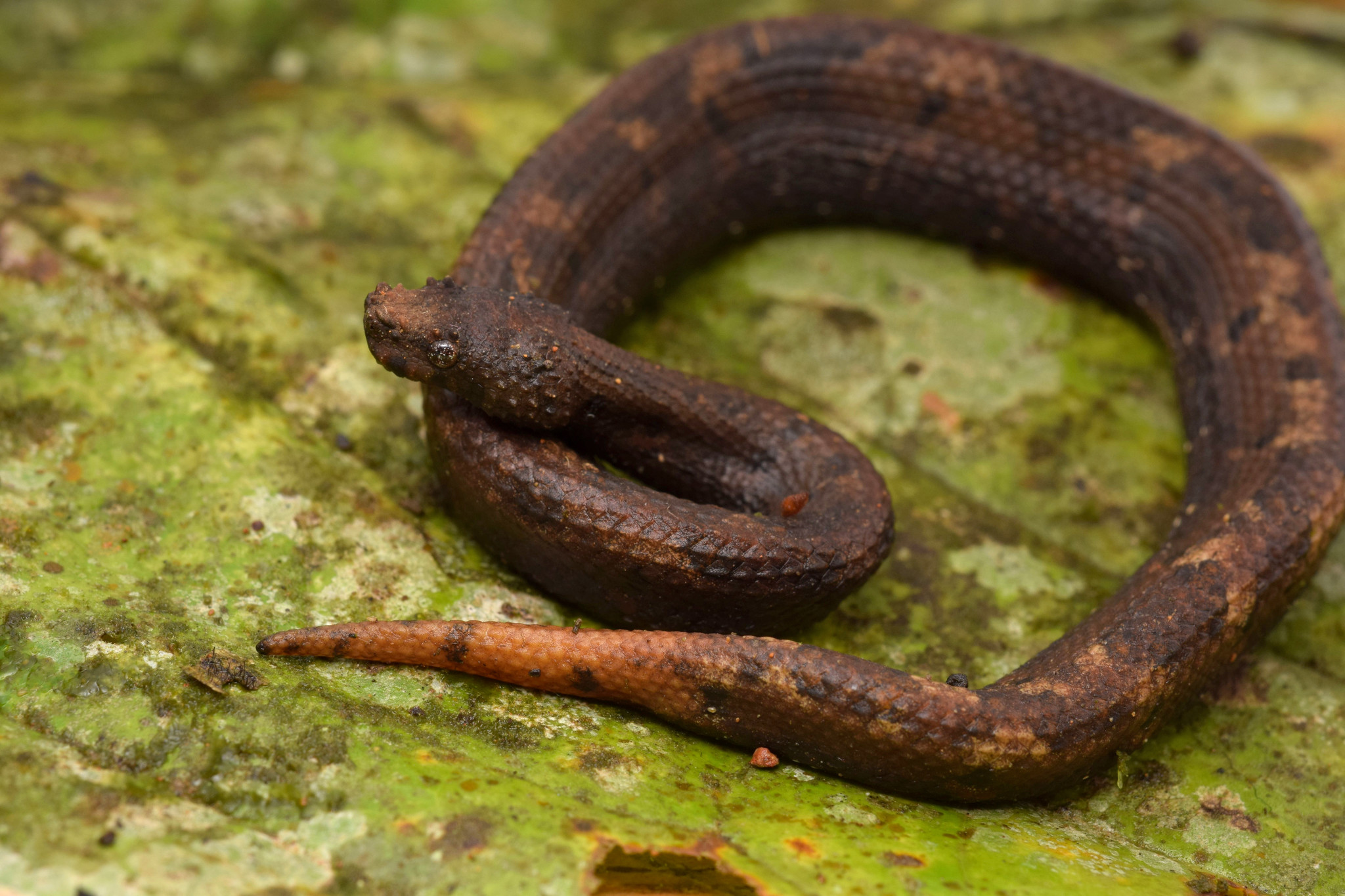
- In Ecuador

Conservation status
- Least Concern (IUCN 3.1)
- CITES Appendix II

Scientific classification
- Kingdom: Animalia
- Phylum: Chordata
- Class: Reptilia
- Order: Squamata
- Suborder: Serpentes
- Family: Tropidophiidae
- Genus: Tropidophis
- Species: T. boulengeri

Binomial name
- Tropidophis boulengeri (Peracca, 1910)

Synonyms
- Trachyboa boulengeri Peracca, 1910

= Tropidophis boulengeri =

Species of snake

Tropidophis boulengeri, commonly known as the northern eyelash boa, is a species of nonvenomous snake in the family Tropidophiidae. It was formerly treated as Trachyboa boulengeri. The species is endemic to Central America.

== Etymology ==
The specific name, boulengeri, is in honor of Belgian-born British herpetologist George Albert Boulenger.

== Geographic range ==
T. boulengeri is found in Colombia, western Ecuador, and Panama.

== Habitat ==
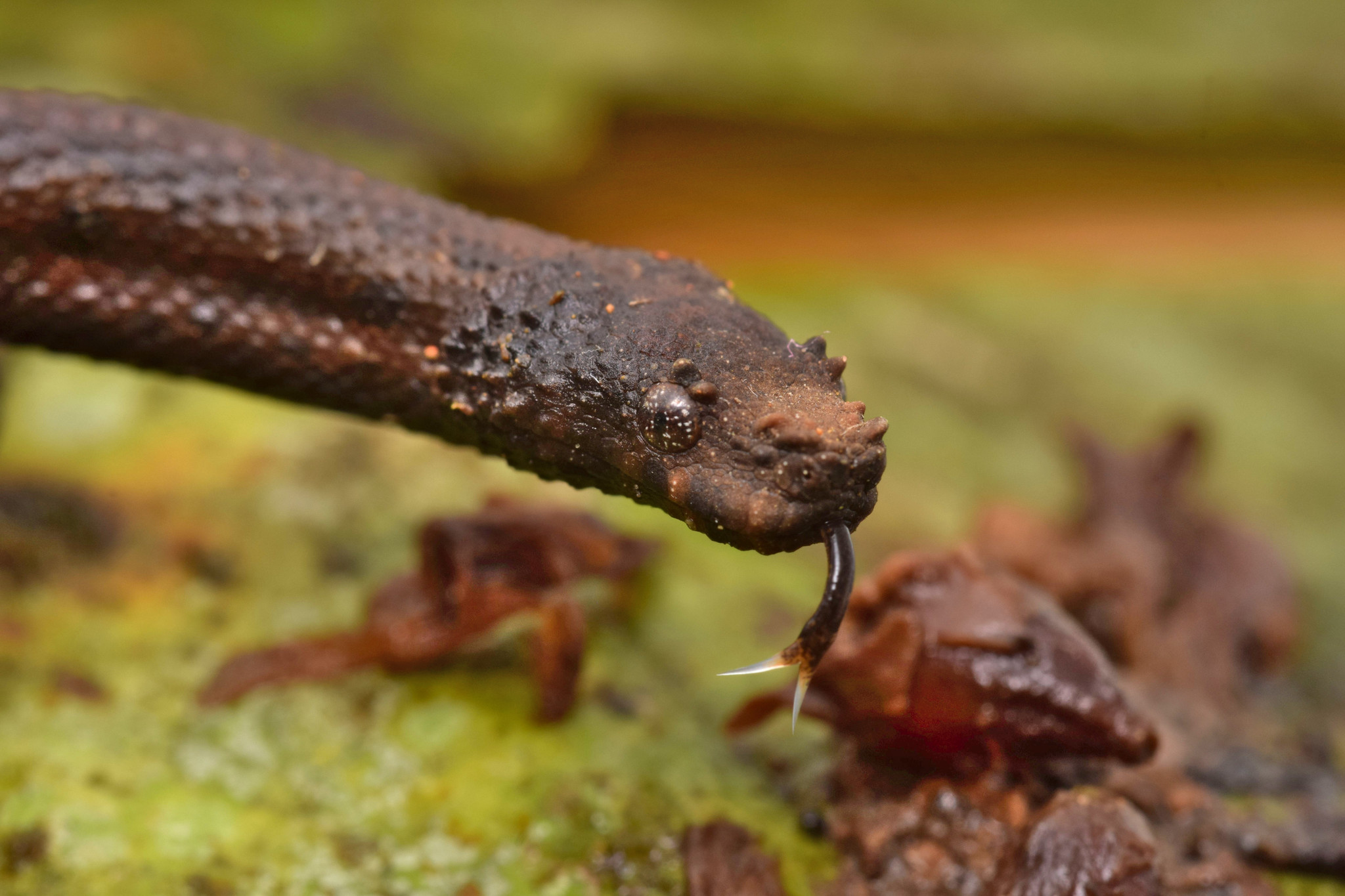
Closeup

The preferred natural habitat of T. boulengeri is evergreen lowland forest, at altitudes from sea level to 1,000 m (3,300 ft). It is usually found near freshwater flooded areas, irrigation ditches, and rivers.

== Diet ==
T. boulengeri preys on frogs and fishes.

== Reproduction ==
T. boulengeri is viviparous.
