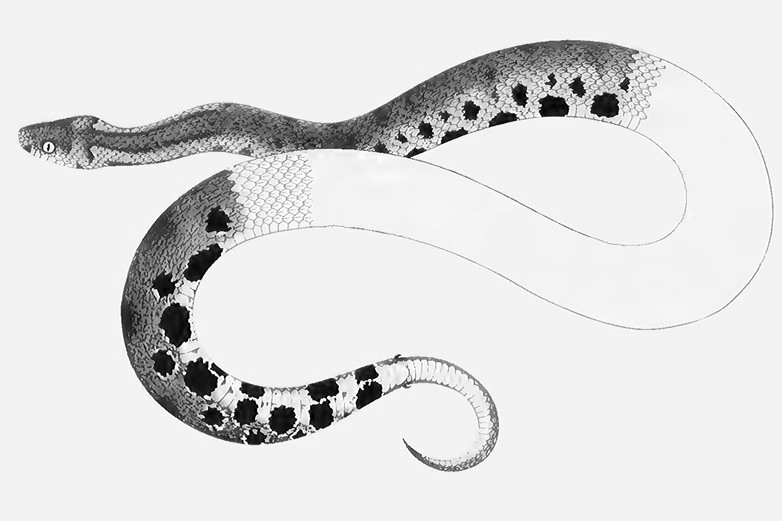

Conservation status
- Critically endangered, possibly extinct (IUCN 3.1)
- CITES Appendix II

Scientific classification
- Kingdom: Animalia
- Phylum: Chordata
- Class: Reptilia
- Order: Squamata
- Suborder: Serpentes
- Family: Tropidophiidae
- Genus: Tropidophis
- Species: T. gularis

Binomial name
- Tropidophis gularis W. Peters, 1860

Synonyms
- Trachyboa gularis W. Peters, 1860

= Tropidophis gularis =

Species of snake

Tropidophis gularis, commonly known as the Southern Eyelash Boa or Ecuadorian eyelash boa, is a species of non-venomous snake in the family Tropidophiidae. It was formerly treated as Trachyboa gularis. The species is endemic to Ecuador, and is only known from an area where suitable habitat has been almost completely destroyed. Recent confirmed records are also lacking, and the IUCN has concluded that Tropidophis gularis is a possibly extinct species.
