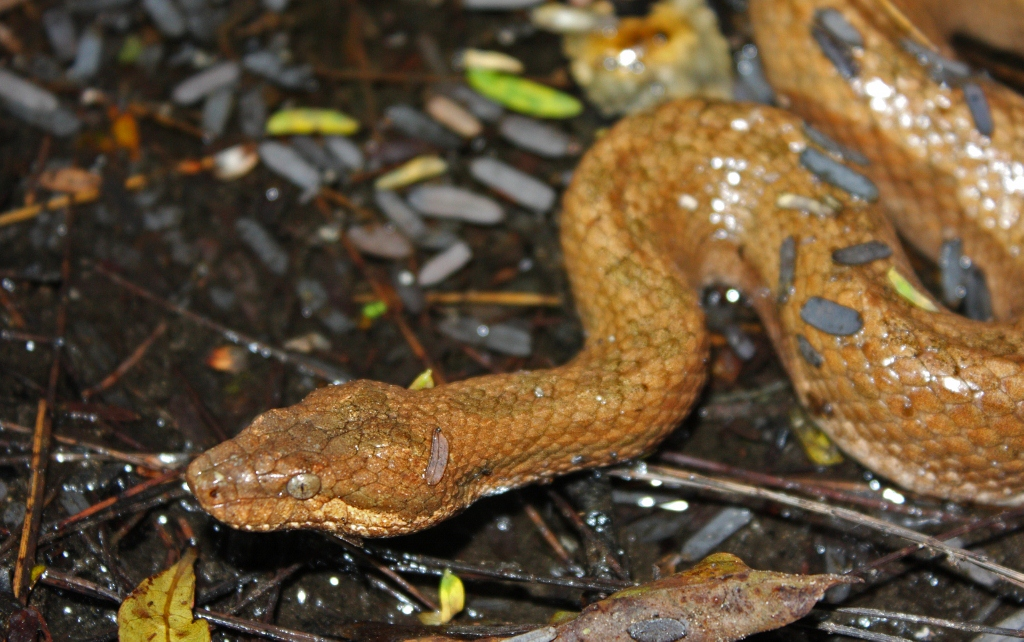
- Tropidophis melanurus

Scientific classification
- Kingdom: Animalia
- Phylum: Chordata
- Class: Reptilia
- Order: Squamata
- Suborder: Serpentes
- Family: Tropidophiidae
- Genus: Tropidophis; Bibron In de la Sagra, 1843

Synonyms
- List: Tropidophis Bibron In de la Sagra, 1843; Leionotus Bibron In de la Sagra, 1843; Ungalia Gray, 1842; Erycopsis Fitzinger, 1843; Notophis Hallowell, 1856; Ungalia Cope, 1868

= Tropidophis =

Genus of snakes

Tropidophis, common name Caribbean dwarf boas, wood snakes or West Indian wood snakes, is a genus of dwarf boas endemic to the West Indies and South America. Currently, either 17 or 33 species are recognized, depending on the authority.

== Distribution and habitat ==
Found in the West Indies, including Cuba, and in South America (Brazil, Peru and Ecuador).

== Description ==
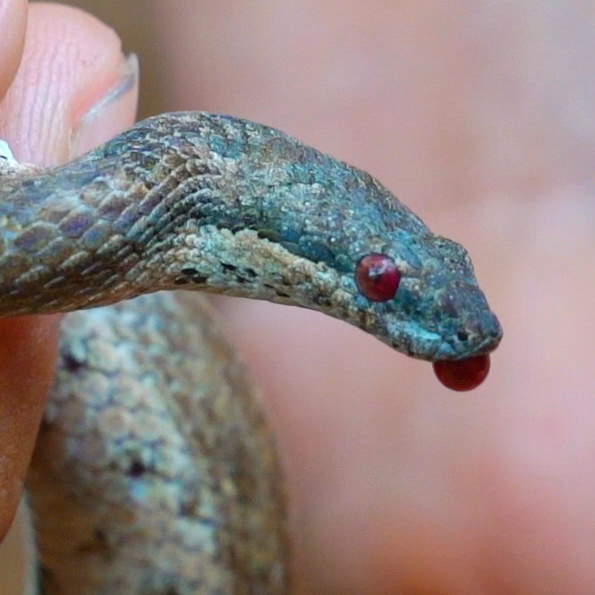
Autohaemorrhaging in T. curtus

Adults grow to between 30 and 60 cm (12 and 24 in) in total length (including tail). They are secretive and predominantly terrestrial, found in a variety of natural habitats, including rain forest, swamps, pine woods and scrub, as well as in the vicinity of human habitation. They have an interesting defensive habit of autohaemorrhaging from the mouth, nostrils and eyes when disturbed. Some species also change colour over the course of the day.

== Conservation ==
Despite their relatively small size and secretive nature, some species may be susceptible to extirpation, mainly due to habitat alteration and introduced feral animals. The Navassa Island dwarf boa (T. bucculentus) has not been seen for 100 years and is believed to be extinct.

== Taxonomy ==
The Tropidophis dwarf boas have been traditionally considered sister taxa of the Trachyboa. However, a phylogenetic analysis of Tropidophiidae species found the Trachyboa species nested within the Tropidophis species and it was proposed to include all species in Tropidophis.

== Species ==
The following 37 species are recognised by Reptile Database. These include two species that have historically been placed in genus Trachyboa and still are by some authorities.

Species	Taxon author	Subsp.	Common name	Geographic range
Tropidophis battersbyi	Laurent, 1949	0	Battersby's dwarf boa	Ecuador
Tropidophis boulengeri	(Peracca, 1910)	0	Northern eyelash boa	Colombia, Ecuador, Panama,
Tropidophis bucculentus	(Cope, 1868)	0	Navassa Island dwarf boa	Navassa Island
Tropidophis cacuangoae	(Hedges, Estrada & Díaz, 1999)	0		Ecuador
Tropidophis canus	(Cope, 1868)	0	Bahamian pygmy boa constrictor	the Bahamas
Tropidophis caymanensis	Battersby, 1938	0	Cayman Islands dwarf boa	the Cayman Islands
Tropidophis celiae	(Hedges, Estrada & Díaz, 1999)	0	Canasi dwarf boa	Cuba and adjacent islands
Tropidophis curtus	(Garman, 1887)	0	Northern Bahamas dwarf boa	the Bahamas
Tropidophis feicki	Schwartz, 1957	0	broad-banded dwarf boa	western Cuba
Tropidophis fuscus	Hedges & Garrido, 1992	0	Cuban dusky dwarf boa	northeastern Cuba
Tropidophis galacelidus	Schwartz & Garrido, 1975	0	Escambray white-necked dwarf boa	central Cuba
Tropidophis grapiuna	Curcio, Sales-Nunes, Suzart-Argolo, Skuk & Rodrigues, 2012	0		Brazil
Tropidophis greenwayi	Barbour & Shreve, 1936	2	Caicos Islands dwarf boa	the Caicos Islands
Tropidophis gularis	W. Peters, 1860	0	Southern eyelash boa	Ecuador
Tropidophis haetianus	(Cope, 1879)	3	Haitian dwarf boa	Hispaniola and adjacent islands
Tropidophis hardyi	Schwartz & Garrido, 1975	0	Escambray small-headed dwarf boa	Cuba
Tropidophis hendersoni	Hedges & Garrido, 2002	0	Cuban khaki dwarf boa	Cuba
Tropidophis jamaicensis	Stull, 1928	0	Jamaican dwarf boa	Jamaica
Tropidophis leonae	Landestoy, 2023	0	Jaragua golden trope	Dominican Republic
Tropidophis maculatus	(Bibron, 1840)	0	spotted red dwarf boa	western Cuba
Tropidophis melanurus^{T}	(Schlegel, 1837)	3	dusky dwarf boa	Cuba and adjacent islands
Tropidophis morenoi	Hedges, Garrido & Díaz, 2001	0	zebra dwarf boa	Cuba
Tropidophis nigriventris	Bailey, 1937	0	black-bellied dwarf boa	central Cuba
Tropidophis pardalis	(Gundlach, 1840)	0	leopard dwarf boa	Cuba and adjacent islands
Tropidophis parkeri	Grant, 1941	0	Parker's dwarf boa	Little Cayman Island
Tropidophis paucisquamis	(F. Müller, 1901)	0	Brazilian dwarf boa	Brazil in Espírito Santo, Rio de Janeiro and São Paulo
Tropidophis preciosus	Curcio, Sales Nunes, Suzart Argolo, Skuk & Rodrigues, 2012	0		Brazil
Tropidophis pilsbryi	Bailey, 1937	0	Cuban white-necked dwarf boa	central and eastern Cuba
Tropidophis schwartzi	Thomas, 1963	0	Schwartz's dwarf boa	the Cayman Islands
Tropidophis semicinctus	(Gundlach & W. Peters, 1864)	0	yellow-banded dwarf boa	western and central Cuba
Tropidophis spiritus	Hedges & Garrido, 1999	0	Sancti Spíritus dwarf boa	Cuba
Tropidophis steinleini	Díaz & Cádiz, 2020	0		Cuba
Tropidophis stejnegeri	Grant, 1940	0	Stejneger's dwarf boa	northern Jamaica
Tropidophis stullae	Grant, 1940	0	Stull's dwarf boa	southern Jamaica
Tropidophis taczanowskyi	(Steindachner, 1880)	0	Taczanowski's dwarf boa	Amazonian Peru and Ecuador
Tropidophis wrighti	Stull, 1928	0	Wright's dwarf boa	eastern Cuba
Tropidophis xanthogaster	Domínguez, Moreno & Hedges, 2006	0	Guanahacabibes dwarf boa	Cuba

There are currently 37 species, of which 29 are West Indian and 17 Cuban. The species in Cuba are the most diverse.
