= Exiliboa =

Conservation status
- Vulnerable (IUCN 3.1)
- CITES Appendix II

Scientific classification
- Kingdom: Animalia
- Phylum: Chordata
- Class: Reptilia
- Order: Squamata
- Suborder: Serpentes
- Family: Boidae
- Subfamily: Ungaliophiinae
- Genus: Exiliboa; Bogert, 1968
- Species: E. placata

Binomial name
- Exiliboa placata Bogert, 1968

Synonyms
- Exiloboa [sic] placata Myers, 1974 (ex errore)

Genus of snakes

Common names: Oaxacan dwarf boa.

Exiliboa is a monotypic genus created for the non-venomous boa species Exiliboa placata, which is endemic to southern Mexico. No subspecies are currently recognized.

== Description ==
E. placata is shiny black in color.

== Behavior ==
E. placata is fossorial.

== Geographic range ==
E. placata is found in the Mexican state of Oaxaca in the Sierra de Juárez and Sierra Mixe near Totontepec. The type locality given is "near latitude 17° 37' N. and longitude 96° 25' W., at an elevation of approximately 2300 meters [7,546 feet] on the headwaters of the Río Valle Nacional on the northern slopes of the Sierra de Juárez, in the State of Oaxaca, Mexico".

== Conservation status ==
E. placata is classified as vulnerable on the IUCN Red List of Threatened Species under criterion B1ab(iii). A species is listed as such when the best available evidence indicates that the geographic range, in the form of extent of occurrence, is estimated to be less than 20,000 km^{2} (7,772 sq mi), estimates indicate it to be severely fragmented or known to exist at no more than 10 locations, and a continuing decline has been observed, inferred or projected in the area, extent and/or quality of habitat. It is therefore considered to be facing a high risk of extinction in the wild. The population trend is down.
