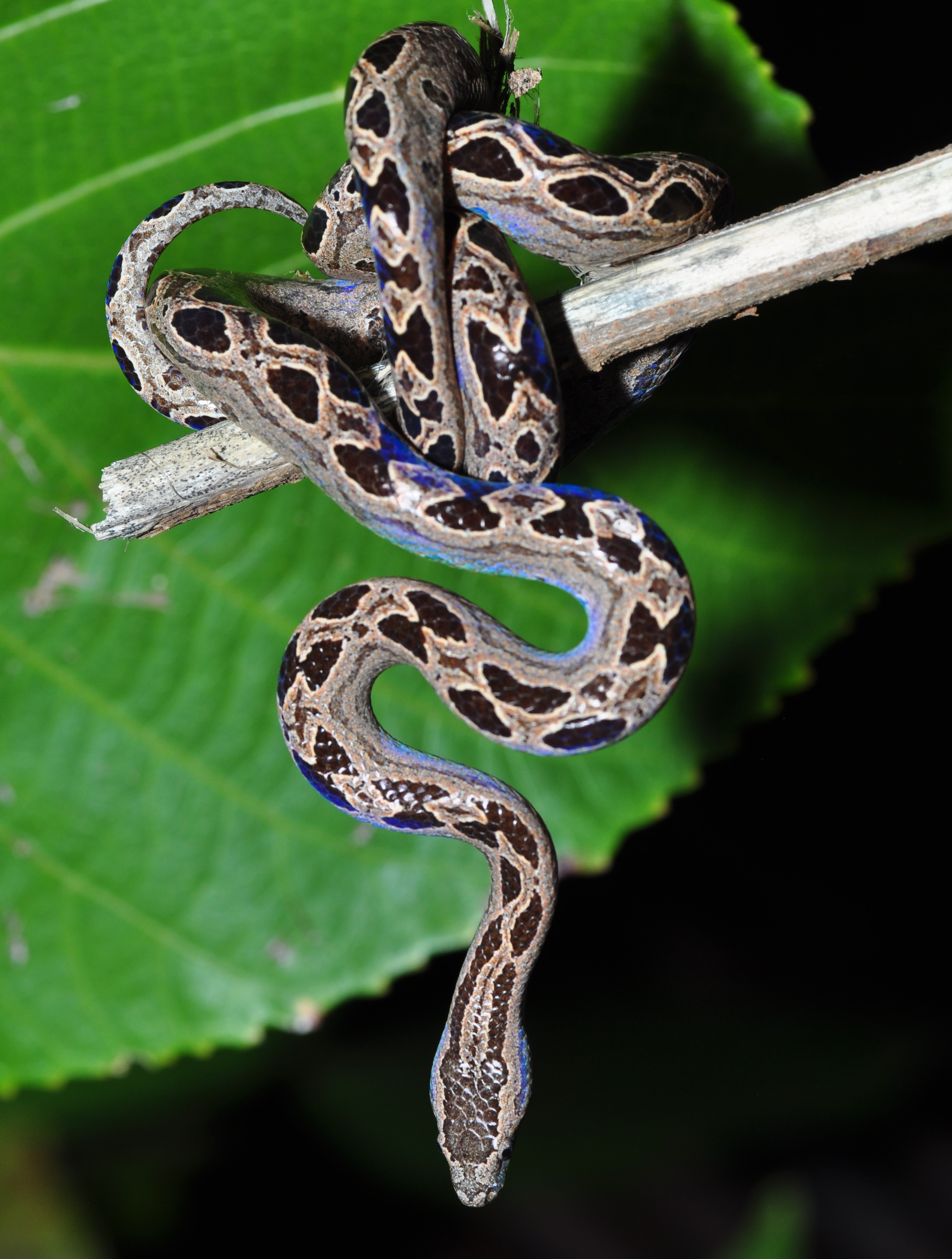
- Panamanian dwarf boa (Ungaliophis panamensis)

Scientific classification
- Domain: Eukaryota
- Kingdom: Animalia
- Phylum: Chordata
- Class: Reptilia
- Order: Squamata
- Suborder: Serpentes
- Family: Boidae
- Subfamily: Ungaliophiinae
- Genus: Ungaliophis; Müller, 1880

Synonyms
- Ungaliophis - Müller, 1880; Peropodum - Bocourt In A.H.A. Duméril, Bocourt & Mocquard, 1882

= Ungaliophis =

Genus of snakes

Common names: neotropical dwarf boas, bromeliad boas, banana boas.

Ungaliophis is a genus of dwarf boas found from southern Mexico to Colombia. Currently, two species are recognized.

== Geographic range ==
Found from the Pacific coastal plain and Meseta Central of Chiapas in Mexico, south through Central America (Pacific Guatemala, Honduras, Nicaragua, Costa Rica and Panama) to Colombia.

== Habitat ==
These snakes occupy a range of habitats from lowland rainforest to highland pine-oak forests to cloud forests. Their vertical distribution ranges from sea level to 2,300 m elevation.

== Species ==
Species*	Taxon author	Common name	Geographic range
U. continentalis^{T}	Müller, 1880	Chiapan dwarf boa	Southern Mexico (eastern Chiapas), southwestern Guatemala and Honduras.
U. panamensis	Schmidt, 1933	Panamanian dwarf boa	Southern Nicaragua, Costa Rica, Panama and western Colombia.

^{T} Type species.
