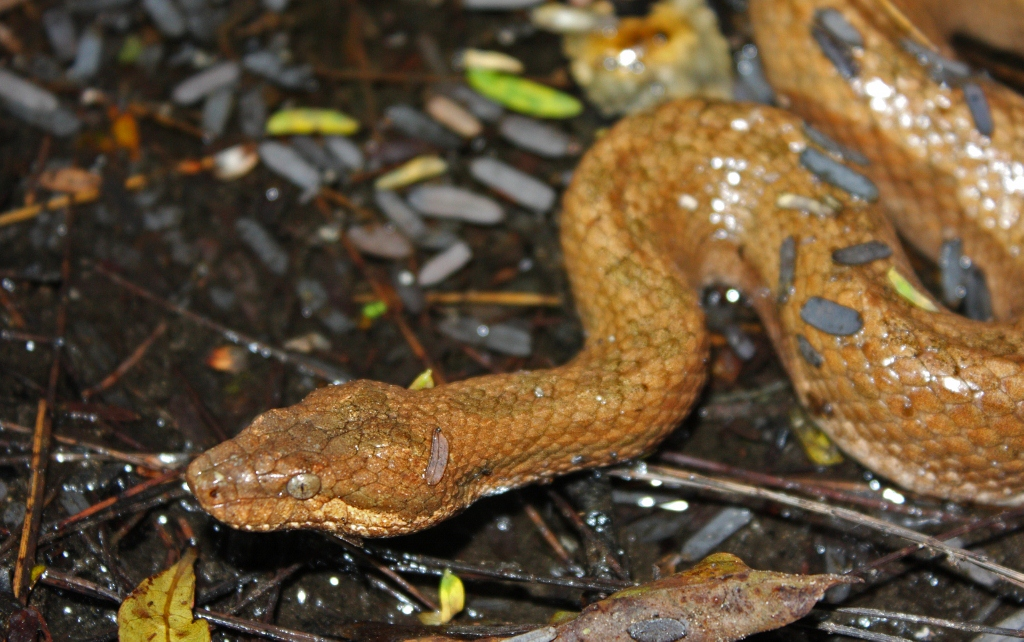
- Tropidophis melanurus

Scientific classification
- Kingdom: Animalia
- Phylum: Chordata
- Class: Reptilia
- Order: Squamata
- Suborder: Serpentes
- Clade: Amerophidia
- Family: Tropidophiidae; Brongersma, 1951

Synonyms
- Ungualiidae Cope, 1894; Ungaliidae Cope, 1900; Tropidophinae Brongersma, 1951; Tropidophidae Underwood, 1976; Tropidophiidae Duellman, 1979; Tropidopheidae McDowell, 1987; Ungaliopheinae McDowell, 1987; Tropidopheinae — McDowell, 1987; Tropidopheidae — H.M. Smith & Preston, 1987; Tropidopheoidae — H.M. Smith & Chiszar, 1992

= Tropidophiidae =

Family of snakes

The Tropidophiidae, common name dwarf boas or thunder snakes, are a family of nonvenomous snakes found from Mexico and the West Indies south to southeastern Brazil. These are small to medium-sized fossorial snakes, some with beautiful and striking color patterns. Currently, two living genera, containing 34 species, are recognized. Two other genera (Ungaliophis and Exiliboa) were once considered to be tropidophiids but are now known to be more closely related to the boids, and are classified in the subfamily Ungaliophiinae. There are a relatively large number of fossil snakes that have been described as tropidophiids (because their vertebrae are easy to identify), but which of these are more closely related to Tropidophis and Trachyboa and which are more closely related to Ungaliophis and Exiliboa is unknown.

== Description ==
This family is confined to the neotropics, mainly in Hispaniola, Jamaica, and the Cayman Islands, with the greatest diversity being in Cuba, where new species are still being discovered. These snakes are relatively small, averaging to about 30–60 cm (12–24 in) in total length (including the tail).

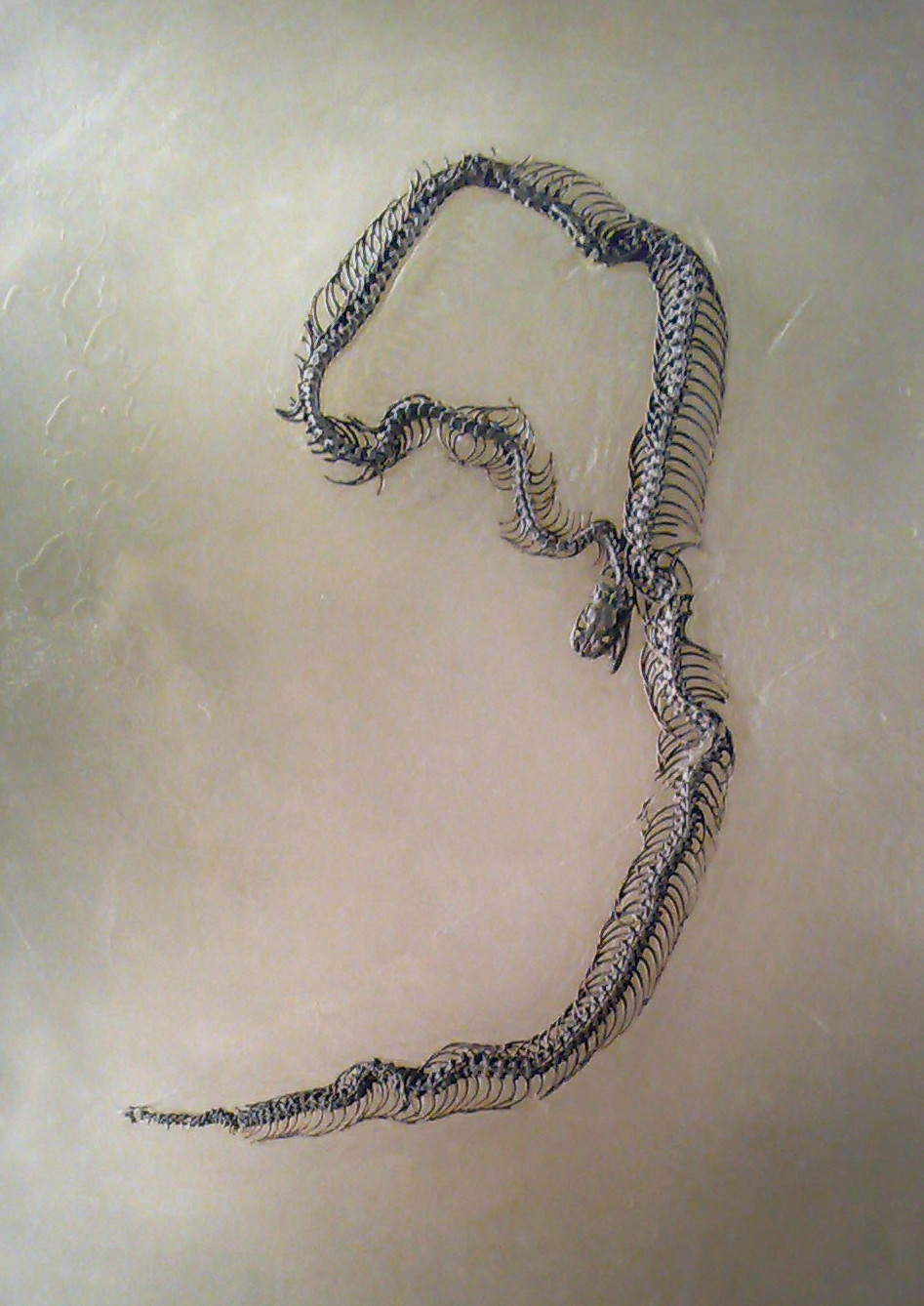
Rieppelophis ermannorum, an extinct pygmy boa

== Behavior ==
Most species spend their day burrowed underground or under vegetation, surfacing only at night or when it rains. Some species are arboreal and are often seen hiding in bromeliads in trees.

== Color change ==
The dwarf boas can change color from light (when they are active at night) to dark (inactive in the day). This color change is brought about by the movement of dark pigment granules.

== Defensive behavior ==
When threatened, tropidophiids coil up into a tight ball. A more peculiar defensive behavior is their ability to bleed voluntarily from the eyes, mouth, and nostrils, a trait not unlike the Phrynosoma of North America (commonly known as the horned lizards or “horny toads”), which are famous for auto-hemorrhaging from their eyes as a defense tactic.

== Distribution and habitat ==
They are found from southern Mexico and Central America, south to northwestern South America in Colombia, (Amazonian) Ecuador, and Peru, as well as in northwestern and southeastern Brazil, and also in the West Indies.

== Fossils ==
Fossils of 10 extinct species in five genera from the Paleocene, Eocene, and Oligocene of Europe, Africa, and North and South America have been assigned to the Tropidophiidae, although all of them are probably actually either ungaliophiines or stem afrophidians. Two genera, Falseryx and Rottophis, both from the Oligocene of western Europe, have some similarities with living tropidophiids as well as with ungaliophiines, but for the most part their skulls are poorly preserved, leaving paleontologists to work on just their vertebrae. Paleogene erycines dominated the snake fauna of North America prior to the Miocene explosion of colubroids, but as far as we know all of these species were much more closely related to modern rosy and rubber boas than they were to tropidophiids. The only unequivocal tropidophiid fossils are from the Pleistocene of Florida and the Bahamas.

== Genera ==
Genus	Taxon author	Species	Common name	Geographic range
Trachyboa	W. Peters, 1860	2	eyelash boas	Panama, Pacific Colombia and Ecuador
Tropidophis^{T}	Bibron, 1840	either 17 or 33	wood snakes or West; Indian wood snakes	the West Indies, Brazil, Peru and Ecuador

^{T} Type genus.
