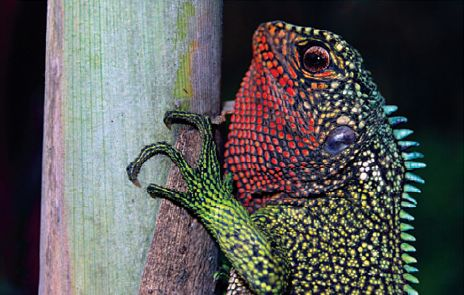
- Enyalioides rubrigularis

Scientific classification
- Kingdom: Animalia
- Phylum: Chordata
- Class: Reptilia
- Order: Squamata
- Suborder: Iguania
- Family: Hoplocercidae
- Genus: Enyalioides; Boulenger, 1885

= Enyalioides =

Genus of lizards

Enyalioides is a genus of lizards in the family Hoplocercidae. The genus is native to the northern part of South America and Panama. Species in the genus are commonly referred to as woodlizards, although individual species are also called dwarf iguanas.

== Species ==
The following 19 species are recognized as being valid.

Image	Scientific name	Common name	Distribution
	Enyalioides altotambo Torres-Carvajal, Venegas & de Queiroz, 2015		tropical northwestern Andes in Ecuador
	Enyalioides anisolepis Torres-Carvajal, Venegas & de Queiroz, 2015		Amazonian slopes of the Andes range in southern Ecuador and northern Peru.
	Enyalioides annularis (O’Shaughnessy, 1881)	ringed manticore, ringed spinytail iguana	Ecuador, southern Colombia
	Enyalioides azulae Venegas, Torres-Carvajal, Duran & de Queiroz, 2013		Peru
	Enyalioides binzayedi Venegas, Torres-Carvajal, Duran & de Queiroz, 2013		Peru
	Enyalioides cofanorum Duellman, 1973	Cofán wood lizard, Duellman's dwarf iguana	Colombia and Ecuador
	Enyalioides feiruzae Venegas, Chávez, García-Ayachi, Duran & Torres-Carvajal, 2021		Río Huallaga Basin, Peru
	Enyalioides groi Dunn, 1933	Gro’s manticores, Dunn's spinytail lizard, Dunn's spinytail iguana	Panama, northwestern Colombia
	Enyalioides heterolepis (Bocourt, 1874)	Bocourt's dwarf iguana	Colombia, Ecuador, Panama
	Enyalioides laticeps (Guichenot, 1855)	Amazon wood lizard	Colombia, Ecuador, Brazil, and Peru
	Enyalioides microlepis (O’Shaughnessy, 1881)	small-scaled woodlizard, tiny-scale dwarf iguana	Ecuador (east of the Andes), southern Colombia, northern Peru
	Enyalioides oshaughnessyi (Boulenger, 1881)	red-eyed woodlizard, O'Shaughnessy's dwarf iguana	northern Ecuador, southern Colombia
	Enyalioides palpebralis (Boulenger, 1883)	horned wood lizard	northern Bolivia, western Brazil, and eastern Peru
	Enyalioides peruvianus Köhler, 2003	Cenepa manticore	northern Peru
	Enyalioides praestabilis (O’Shaughnessy, 1881)	blue-spotted wood lizard	Colombia, Ecuador, and Peru
	Enyalioides rubrigularis Torres-Carvajal, De Queiroz & Etheridge, 2009	red-throated wood lizard	Ecuador
	Enyalioides rudolfarndti Venegas, Duran, Landauro & Lujan, 2011		central Peru
	Enyalioides sophiarothschildae Torres-Carvajal, Venegas & de Queiroz, 2015		Cordillera Central in northeastern Peru
	Enyalioides touzeti Torres-Carvajal, Almendáriz, Valencia, Yánez-Muñoz & Reyes, 2008	Touzet's woodlizard	southwestern Ecuador (Azuay Province), northwestern Peru

Nota bene: A binomial authority in parentheses indicates that the species was originally described in a genus other than Enyalioides.
