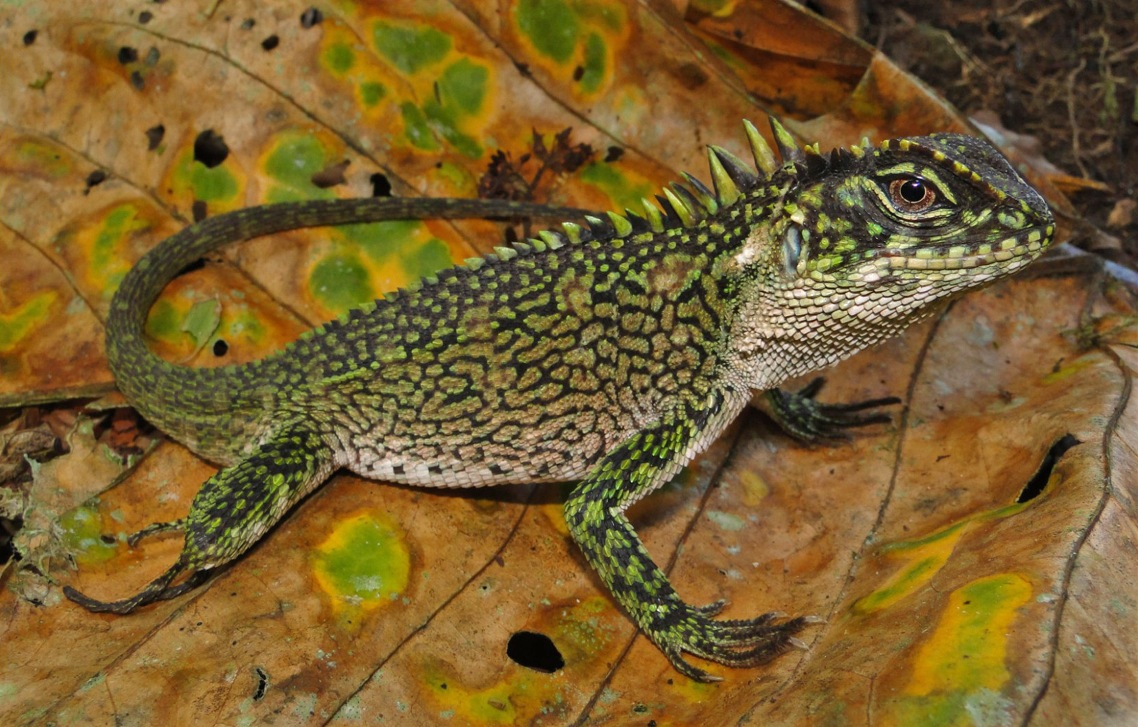
- Enyalioides binzayedi

Scientific classification
- Kingdom: Animalia
- Phylum: Chordata
- Class: Reptilia
- Order: Squamata
- Suborder: Iguania
- Infraorder: Pleurodonta
- Family: Hoplocercidae; Frost & Etheridge, 1989

Genera
- 2 genera (20 recognized species), see article.

= Hoplocercidae =

Family of lizards

Hoplocercidae are a family of lizards native to the tropical forests, woodlands and savanna-like habitats of Central and South America. 20 species in two genera are described.

== Species ==
Family: Hoplocercidae

- Genus Enyalioides
  - Enyalioides altotambo Torres-Carvajal, Venegas, & de Queiroz, 2015 – Alto Tambo woodlizard
  - Enyalioides anisolepis Torres-Carvajal, Venegas, & de Queiroz, 2015 – rough-scaled woodlizard
  - Enyalioides annularis (O’Shaughnessy, 1881) – ringed manticore, ringed spinytail iguana
  - Enyalioides azulae Venegas, Torres-Carvajal, Duran, & de Queiroz, 2013
  - Enyalioides binzayedi Venegas, Torres-Carvajal, Duran, & de Queiroz, 2013
  - Enyalioides cofanorum Duellman, 1973 – Cofan woodlizard, Duellman's dwarf iguana
  - Enyalioides feiruzae Venegas, Chávez, García-Ayachi, Duran, & Torres-Carvajal, 2021
  - Enyalioides groi Dunn, 1933 – Dunn's spinytail lizard, Gro's manticore, Dunn's spinytail iguana
  - Enyalioides heterolepis (Bocourt, 1874) – Bocourt's dwarf iguana
  - Enyalioides laticeps (Guichenot, 1855) – broad-headed woodlizard, Guichenot's dwarf iguana
  - Enyalioides microlepis (O'Shaughnessy, 1881) – small-scaled woodlizard, tiny-scale dwarf iguana
  - Enyalioides oshaughnessyi (Boulenger, 1881) – red-eyed woodlizard, O'Shaughnessy's dwarf iguana
  - Enyalioides palpebralis (Boulenger, 1883) – horned woodlizard, Boulenger's dwarf iguana
  - Enyalioides peruvianus Köhler, 2003 – Cenepa manticore
  - Enyalioides praestabilis (O'Shaughnessy, 1881) – blue-spotted woodlizard
  - Enyalioides rubrigularis Torres-Carvajal, de Queiroz, & Etheridge, 2009 – red-throated woodlizard
  - Enyalioides rudolfarndti Venegas, Duran, Landauro, & Lujan, 2011
  - Enyalioides sophiarothschildae Torres-Carvajal, Venegas, & de Queiroz, 2015 – Rothschild's woodlizard
  - Enyalioides touzeti Torres-Carvajal, Almendáriz, Valencia, Yúnez-Muñoz, & Reyes, 2008 – Touzet's woodlizard
- Genus Hoplocercus
  - Hoplocercus spinosus Fitzinger, 1843 – spiny weapontail
