= Enyalioides microlepis =

Conservation status
- Least Concern (IUCN 3.1)

Scientific classification
- Kingdom: Animalia
- Phylum: Chordata
- Class: Reptilia
- Order: Squamata
- Suborder: Iguania
- Family: Hoplocercidae
- Genus: Enyalioides
- Species: E. microlepis

Binomial name
- Enyalioides microlepis (O'Shaughnessy, 1881)

Synonyms
- Enyalius microlepis O'Shaughnessy, 1881

Species of lizard

Enyalioides microlepis, the small-scaled woodlizard or tiny-scale dwarf iguana, is a species of lizards in the genus Enyalioides, from Peru, Colombia, and Ecuador.
