= Anolis neglectus =

Scientific classification
- Kingdom: Animalia
- Phylum: Chordata
- Class: Reptilia
- Order: Squamata
- Suborder: Iguania
- Family: Anolidae
- Genus: Anolis
- Species: A. neglectus

Binomial name
- Anolis neglectus Prates, Melo-Sampaio, de Queiroz, Carnaval, Rodrigues, & Oliveira Drummond, 2019

Species of lizard

Anolis neglectus, the Serra dos Órgãos anole, is a species of lizard in the family Dactyloidae. The species is found in Brazil.
