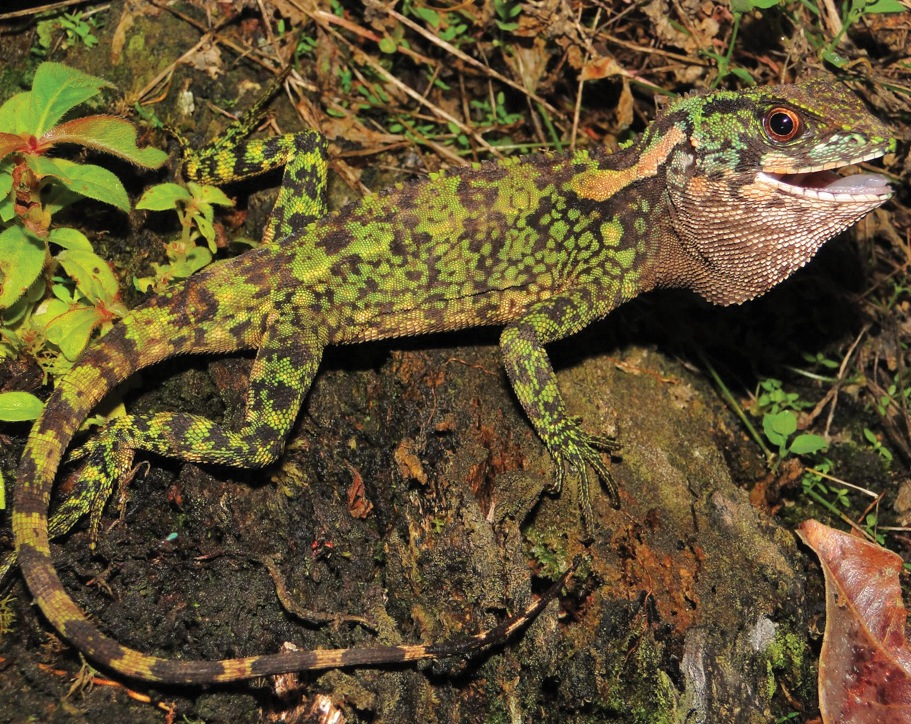
- Enyalioides azulae holotype

Conservation status
- Least Concern (IUCN 3.1)

Scientific classification
- Kingdom: Animalia
- Phylum: Chordata
- Class: Reptilia
- Order: Squamata
- Suborder: Iguania
- Family: Hoplocercidae
- Genus: Enyalioides
- Species: E. azulae

Binomial name
- Enyalioides azulae Venegas, Torres-Carvajal, Duran, de Queiroz, 2013

= Enyalioides azulae =

Species of lizard

Enyalioides azulae is a species of lizards in the family Hoplocercidae. It was formally described in 2013 and is named after the Cordillera Azul National Park in which it was discovered. It is known only from its type locality in the montane rainforest of the Río Huallaga basin in northeastern Peru at an elevation of 1100 m. It is classified by the IUCN as being of least concern, as its entire range lies within the large national park and no threats to the species are known.

== Taxonomy ==
Enyalioides azulae was formally described in 2013 by a group of Peruvian herpetologists based on an adult male specimen collected from Chambirillo station in the Cordillera Azul National Park, in the Department of San Martín, Peru. The specific name "azulae" is derived from the Spanish word azul, "blue". It refers to the type locality, making the species the "Enyalioides of the [Cordillera] Azul".

== Description ==
In the male holotype, the dorsal surface of the head is dark brown with light green flecks and the side of the head is green, with the lorilabial and pretympanic regions are turquoise. There is a narrow black supratemporal stripe, a black oblique stripe extending from eye to the commissure of the mouth, and an orange cream oblique stripe on the suboculars, posterior labials and adjacent gulars. The labial scales are cream-colored and the rostral and mental scales are light green. There is a wide, cream-colored longitudinal stripe extending from above the tympanum to the scapular region. The throat is dirty cream with dark spots and flecks, with a dark brown patch on the medial aspect of the gular fold. The dorsal background is green, with diffuse, transverse dark brown bars on the body, limbs, and tail. The flanks are covered with dark brown reticulations. The ventral surface is tan with diffuse darker brown spots on the thighs. The iris is reddish-copper with a fine golden ring around the pupil.

Females have a brown head with a narrow dark brown supratemporal stripe. There is a broad subocular dark stripe extending from the eye to the commissure of the mouth, with a parallel, conspicuous white or cream-colored stripe immediately anterior to it. There is a pale, wide longitudinal stripe extending from the tympanum to the scapular region. The throat is pale brown without dark markings or white with faint reddish-brown reticulation. The dorsal background is light brown, occasionally with a greenish or coppery hue. There are transverse dark brown bars on the dorsal side of the body, limbs, and tail. The ventral surface is light brown or white. The iris is reddish-brown. Although this species seems to have a marked sexual dichromatism in background colors, one male specimen exhibited metachromatism consisting of dark brown tones being replaced by green tones.

Enyalioides azulae can be distinguished from other species in its genus, excepting E. microlepis and E. cofanorum, by the combination of the following characters: strongly keeled ventral scales; more than 37 longitudinal rows of dorsals in a transverse line between the dorsolateral crests at midbody; and no superciliary flaps projecting over each orbit. Compared to E. microlepis and E. cofanorum, E. azulae has more gulars, a smaller body size, a lower vertebral crest on the neck, a narrower snout in dorsal view, and no blue on the gular region in males. It also shows marked sexual dichromatism in its background coloration, unlike the other two species. E. azulae can also be distinguished from E. cofanorum specifically by the former's lack of scattered enlarged scales on the dorsum, well-developed dorsolateral crests between the hind limbs, and presence of a dark gular patch in females.

== Distribution and habitat ==
Enyalioides azulae is known only from its type locality in the montane rainforest of the Río Huallaga basin in northeastern Peru at an elevation of 1100 m. This locality lies within the Cordillera Azul National Park, on a mountain ridge the Departments of San Martín and Loreto. Most known individuals were collected at night sleeping on low vertical stems of bushes 15–80 cm above the ground, while one male was collected during the day on a narrow trail after a rain. When approached, it fled and hid under a fallen log. Enyalioides azulae lives alongside many other species of lizards, including E. binzayedi and E. laticeps.

== Conservation ==
Despite its small range, Enyalioides azulae is classified by the IUCN as being of least concern, as its entire range lies within the large Cordillera Azul National Park and no threats to the species are known. It is rather common within its known range and is thought to have a stable population.
