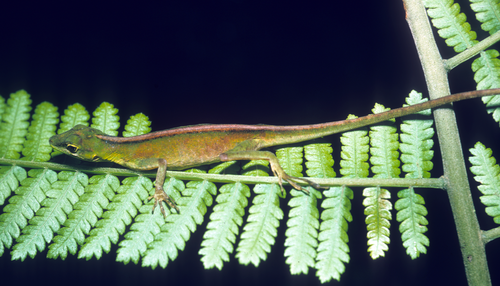

Conservation status
- Least Concern (IUCN 3.1)

Scientific classification
- Kingdom: Animalia
- Phylum: Chordata
- Class: Reptilia
- Order: Squamata
- Suborder: Iguania
- Family: Dactyloidae
- Genus: Anolis
- Species: A. gemmosus

Binomial name
- Anolis gemmosus O'Shaughnessy, 1875

= Anolis gemmosus =

Species of lizard

Anolis gemmosus, O'Shaughnessy's anole or Andes anole, is a species of lizard in the family Dactyloidae. The species is found in Colombia and Ecuador.
