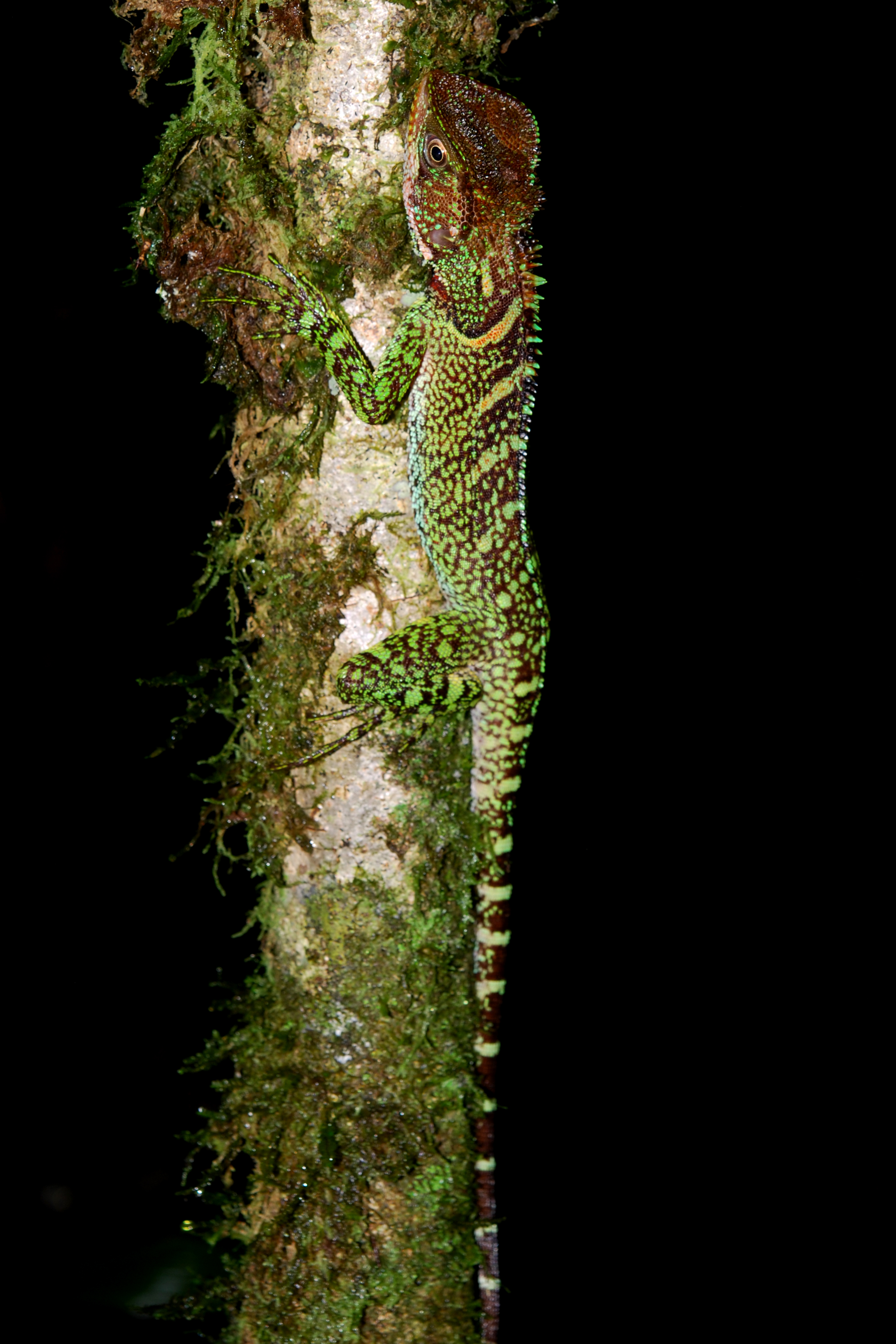

Conservation status
- Least Concern (IUCN 3.1)

Scientific classification
- Kingdom: Animalia
- Phylum: Chordata
- Class: Reptilia
- Order: Squamata
- Suborder: Iguania
- Family: Hoplocercidae
- Genus: Enyalioides
- Species: E. laticeps

Binomial name
- Enyalioides laticeps Guichenot, 1855

Synonyms
- Enyalioides festae Peracca, 1897; Enyalius coerulescens Cope, 1876; Enyalius laticeps Guichenot, 1855; Enyalius planiceps Guichenot, 1855

= Enyalioides laticeps =

Amazon wood lizard

Species of lizard

Enyalioides laticeps, the Amazon broad-headed wood lizard, is a dwarf iguanian lizard found abundantly in Amazonian rainforests. They are semi-arboreal. Other common names for these lizards include big-headed stick lizards (lagartijas de palo de cabezonas), Guichenot's dwarf iguana, Amazon dwarf-iguana (Iguana enana amazónica), and Amazon forest dragon.

E. laticeps is a small, ornamented lizard that grows up to 157 millimetres (6.2 in) long and features a very high vertebral crest along its back. They may change color based on environmental factors and rely on rapid running to move around, though they spend the vast majority of their time motionless, blending into the rainforest background (branches, palm fronds) and ambushing prey. When attacked by predators, E. laticeps may remain motionless like a wood stick to avoid predation. If discovered, it may suddenly spring into motion, quickly retreating to burrows in the ground.

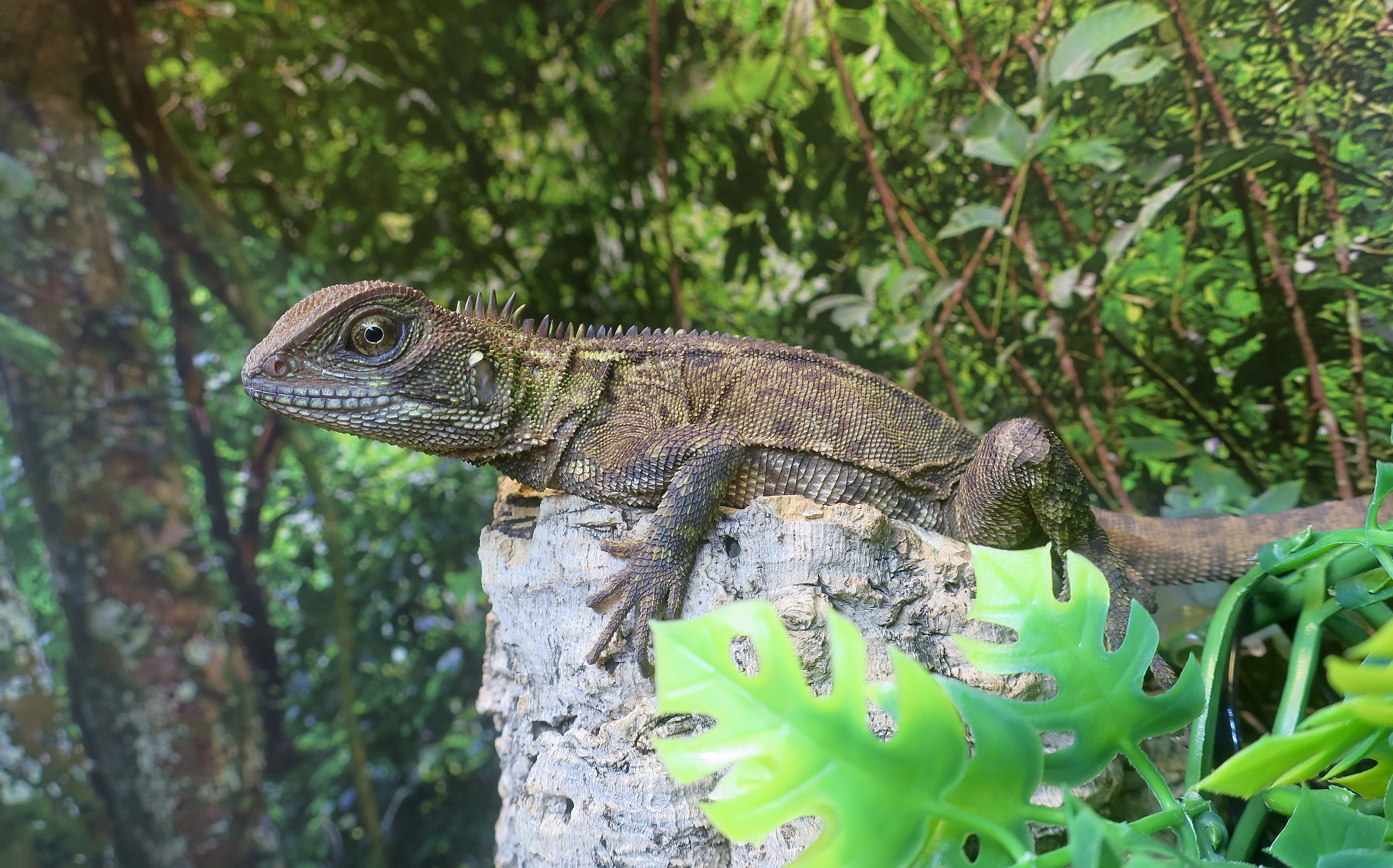
At 9th Island Reptiles, a pet shop in Las Vegas

== Taxonomy ==
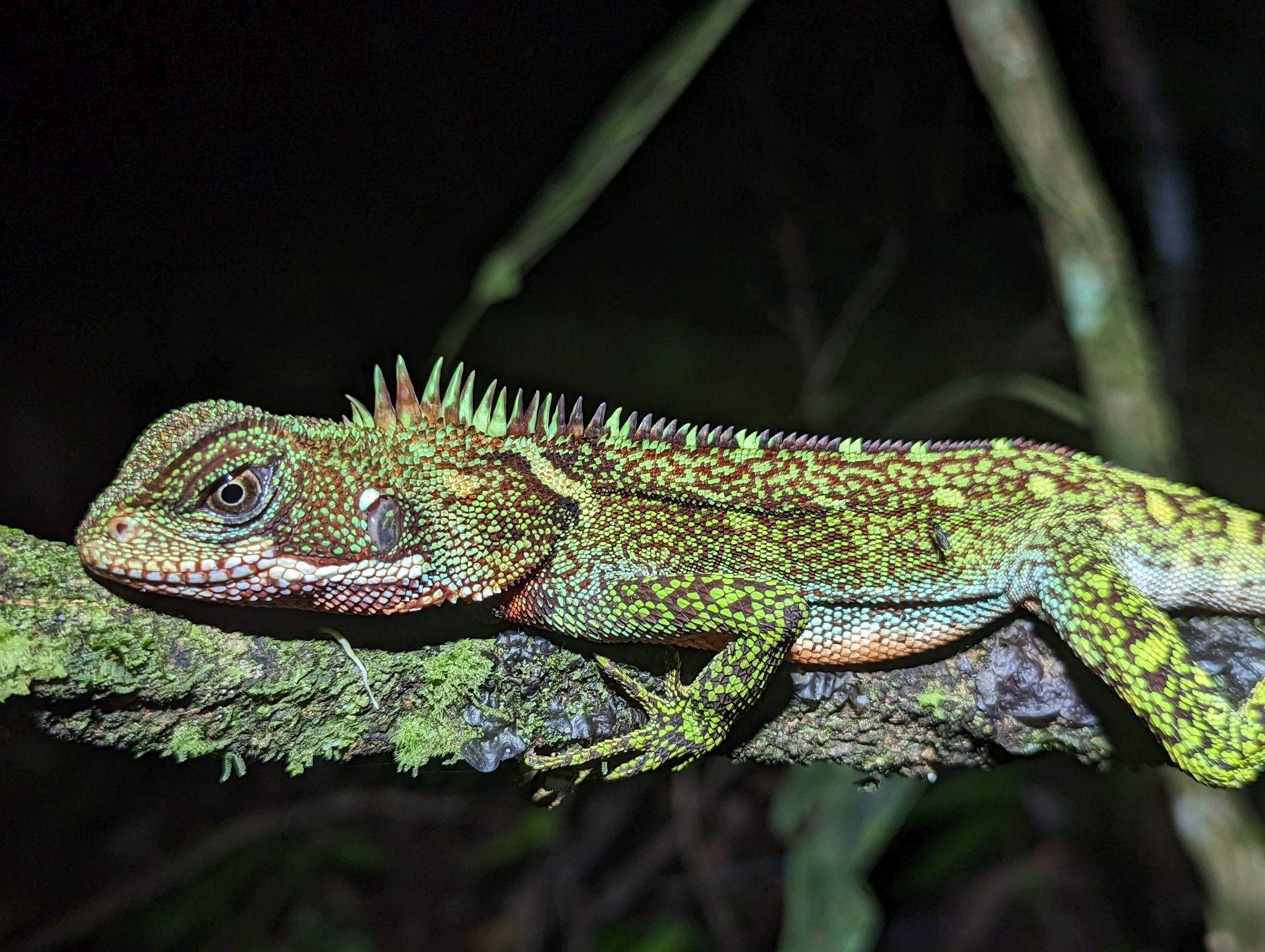
E. laticeps in Ecuador

The Amazon broad-headed wood lizard has at least sixteen close relatives, most of them found in Amazonian rainforests, such as the red-eyed dwarf-iguana (Enyalioides oshaughnessyi), blue-spotted dwarf-iguana (E. praestabilis), red-throated dwarf-iguana (E. rubrigularis), blue-throated dwarf-iguana (E. microlepis), and spiny dwarf-iguana (E. heterolepis). Most of these lizards are also small-sized inhabitants of rainforests with similar behaviors, and all Enyalioides species closely resemble each other, with minor physical appearance distinctions. E. laticeps is distinct from these other species by having homogenous sized caudal scales for each caudal section.

The Enyalioides wood lizards also closely resemble a variety of Asian dragons, such as the Chinese water dragon, and the Tuatara of New Zealand. All have a laterally compressed body and crest running from the head down the back. Although Asian dragons can reach lengths of 3 feet (0.91 m) and the Tuatara measures up to more than 1 foot, the Amazon wood lizards, which are dwarf lizards, have adults reaching only 0.5 ft.

=== Etymology ===
The binomial name of the Amazon broad-headed wood lizard, Enyalioides laticeps, means "a broad-head lizard that is an Enyalius look-alike". The genus Enyalius is a distantly related neotropical lizard belonging to a different family (Leiosauridae), and the -oides (εἶδος) suffix comes from ancient Greek and means "look-alike". The specific epithet laticeps is derived from the Latin words latus, meaning "side or broad", and -ceps, meaning "head".

== History ==
The Amazon broad-headed wood lizard was first reported in literature by French naturalist Alphonse Guichenot in 1855 after his expedition in central parts of South America from 1843 to 1847. One of E. laticeps's common names, Guichenot's dwarf iguana, reflects his contribution.

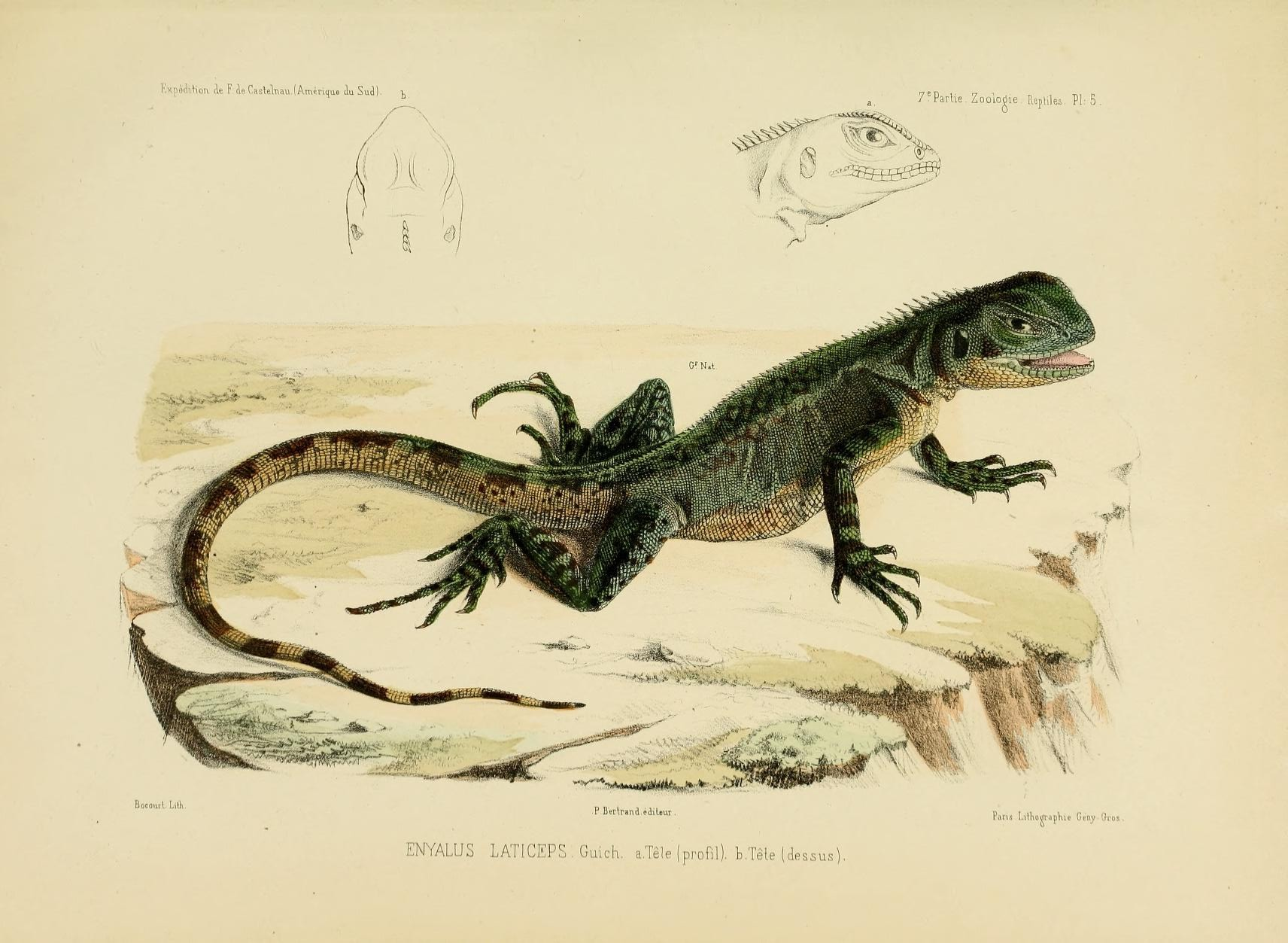
Drawing documenting Enyalioides laticeps.

== Physical description ==
The Amazon broad-headed wood lizard has a vertebral crest (spines) that are continuous throughout the body. The crest is conspicuously high and well developed on the nape (the back of the neck) but low on the dorsal half of the body.

This species of Enyalioides is a dwarf Hoplocercid. The maximum snout to vent length (SVL) is 157 mm for males and 130 mm for females. Its head is relatively large, approximately ⅓ – ¼ of its SVL body length. Typical for Enyalioides lizards, it has a four-sided pyramidal head shape, with two ridges formed by the projecting supraciliaris (the area above the eye/eyebrows). The width of the head is approximately 0.7–0.9 times the length, which is where it gets the name "broad-headed wood lizard". Its body is compressed laterally. E. laticeps has well-developed forelimbs and long hindlimbs. Its tail is long, at 1.5–1.9 times its snout to vent length.

Like other Enyalioid species, E. laticeps can change color when disturbed, replacing green with brown tones. Therefore, dorsal scales of the Amazon broad-headed wood lizard vary from dull green to tan to brown, frequently with some bluish areas; ventral scales vary from white to cream to tan; while the gular or ventral throat region, which is usually relatively inconspicuous for Enyalioids, in males can be dark brown or black.

The general skin color can be mostly spotless, but more commonly it is superimposed with different lighter or darker patterns, which may include a reticulate (net) pattern, dark brown or reddish-brown in color, distributed throughout the dorsolateral surfaces of body, limbs and tail. In some cases, the reticulate pattern is faint and inconspicuous. The patterns may also be chevrons (V- or inverted V-shaped), with alternating lighter and darker color, superimposed on a dorsal longitudinal series of large, oval, and light areas. Sometimes the pattern is simply scattered, irregular clear spots. Juvenile males may have convergent brown lines running towards, but not reaching, the mental (chin). The ventral region is usually not or sparsely spotted. Males can be identified by a 2–3 scale-wide strip of cream, white or orange color.

All wood iguanas (genus Enyalioides) are dwarf. Therefore, several species of wood lizard exist with similar sizes, appearances, behavior and habitats in the Amazonian basin. Torres and Avila-Pires provided ways for identifying E. laticeps specifically: (1) this particular species has dorsal and lateral scales that are homogenous (uniform in size), while other species have the dorsal and lateral scales increase in size posteriorly (in each caudal segment); (2) this species lacks mucrones (sharp tips) on its scales while the larger caudal scales of other species have mucrones or some type of projection; (3) it is the only species having smooth tail, almost circular in its cross-section; (4) most male E. laticeps have a longitudinal stripe of 2–3 scales wide of cream, white, or orange color that runs from the commissure of the mouth to a point below the tympanum; (5) adults of this species also have a mid-dorsal crest higher than that of other species; (6) the most similar species in coloration is E. praestabilis, but this species lacks the horizontal pale-colored lip stripe.

== Ecology ==
The Amazon broad-headed wood lizard is reported to be semi-arboreal (inhabiting trees as well as spending much time on the ground) and is found commonly in primary forest, but sometimes in secondary forest low on vegetation. During the day, this species has been observed mainly in small tree trunks with diameters less than 15 cm. They sleep on vegetation such as branches, palm fronds, or sapling trunks 30–240 cm above the ground, but sometimes inside burrows in the ground. The Amazon broad-headed wood lizard may also retreat into shallow forest floor holes at night. It often adopts a horizontal position at nighttime and hugs thin sticks during sleep. In a study examining their sleeping patterns, flashlights or nearby humans did not bother them, and the lizard switched between two sleeping sites within a small area over the seven nights it was observed.

Amazon broad-headed wood lizards are sunlight-loving, diurnal, and omnivorous. They rely on running to move around. When threatened, the lizard may stay motionless, flee or attempt a threat display, inflating its gular pouch, which reveals patches of darker scales (red or black), and displaying its impressive jaws and teeth. E. laticeps employs various forms of crypsis to avoid predators, including cryptic coloration and attentive immobility. When E. laticeps is distressed, its green tones shift to brown tones, exhibiting metachromatism.

== Distribution and habitat ==
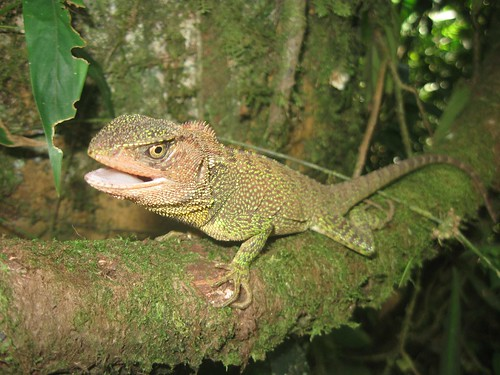
Enyalioides laticeps clinging to a tree branch

Amazon broad-headed wood lizards are found in the Neotropics, distributed throughout the upper western Amazon basin in Colombia, Ecuador, Peru and Brazil. This species is abundant in primary and sometimes secondary forests at elevations between 80 and 1600 m.

E. laticeps is reported to be sympatric with its close relatives, occupying the same geographical area without interbreeding. In Ecuador it has been reported in sympathy with E. cofanorum, E. microlepis and E. praestabilis. In southern Peru, it has been reported in sympathy with E. palpebralis, Morunasaurus annularis and M. peruvianus. Therefore, the lizard is presumed to be sympatric with these species for most of its range.

== Behavior ==
=== Predators ===
The tropical flat snake, Tripanurgos compressus or Siphlophis compressus, is a known predator of E. laticeps, with juvenile E. laticeps being discovered in its stomach. E. laticeps utilizes cryptic coloration and stays motionless to avoid predation. It may also flee and run suddenly in order to hide inside holes in the ground or beneath logs.

=== Diet ===
70.4% of the Amazon broad-headed wood lizard diet consists of spiders, caterpillars and beetle larvae. E. laticeps also preys upon grasshoppers, crickets, and earthworms.

=== Lifecycle ===
E. laticeps is sexual, dioecious, and, like most lizards, oviparous. Female E. laticeps exhibit breeding behavior throughout the year. Females are capable of laying 5 to 7 eggs at a time. E. laticeps eggs are approximately 15–16.6 mm long. From April to August, female E. laticeps are observed to carry 10 or 11 oviductal eggs.

== Conservation status ==
Most wood lizard species, including Enyalioides laticeps, are listed as "Least Concern", following IUCN criteria. The Amazon broad-headed wood lizard is more adaptable than many other lizard species and is not undergoing population decline nor facing any immediate threat of extinction, which may be attributable to its dwarf size, quick running, broad range of habitats, and distribution in protected areas.
