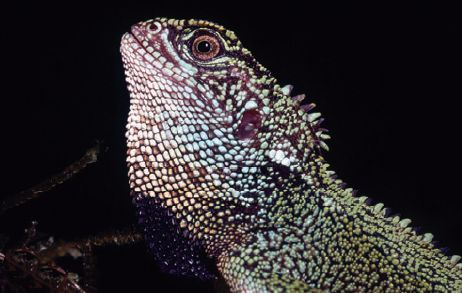
- Male Enyalioides praestabilis

Conservation status
- Least Concern (IUCN 3.1)

Scientific classification
- Kingdom: Animalia
- Phylum: Chordata
- Class: Reptilia
- Order: Squamata
- Suborder: Iguania
- Family: Hoplocercidae
- Genus: Enyalioides
- Species: E. praestabilis

Binomial name
- Enyalioides praestabilis (O'Shaughnessy, 1881)

= Blue-spotted woodlizard =

Species of lizard

The blue-spotted woodlizard (Enyalioides praestabilis) is a species of reptile in the genus Enyalioides, native to Colombia, Ecuador, and Peru.

== Gallery ==
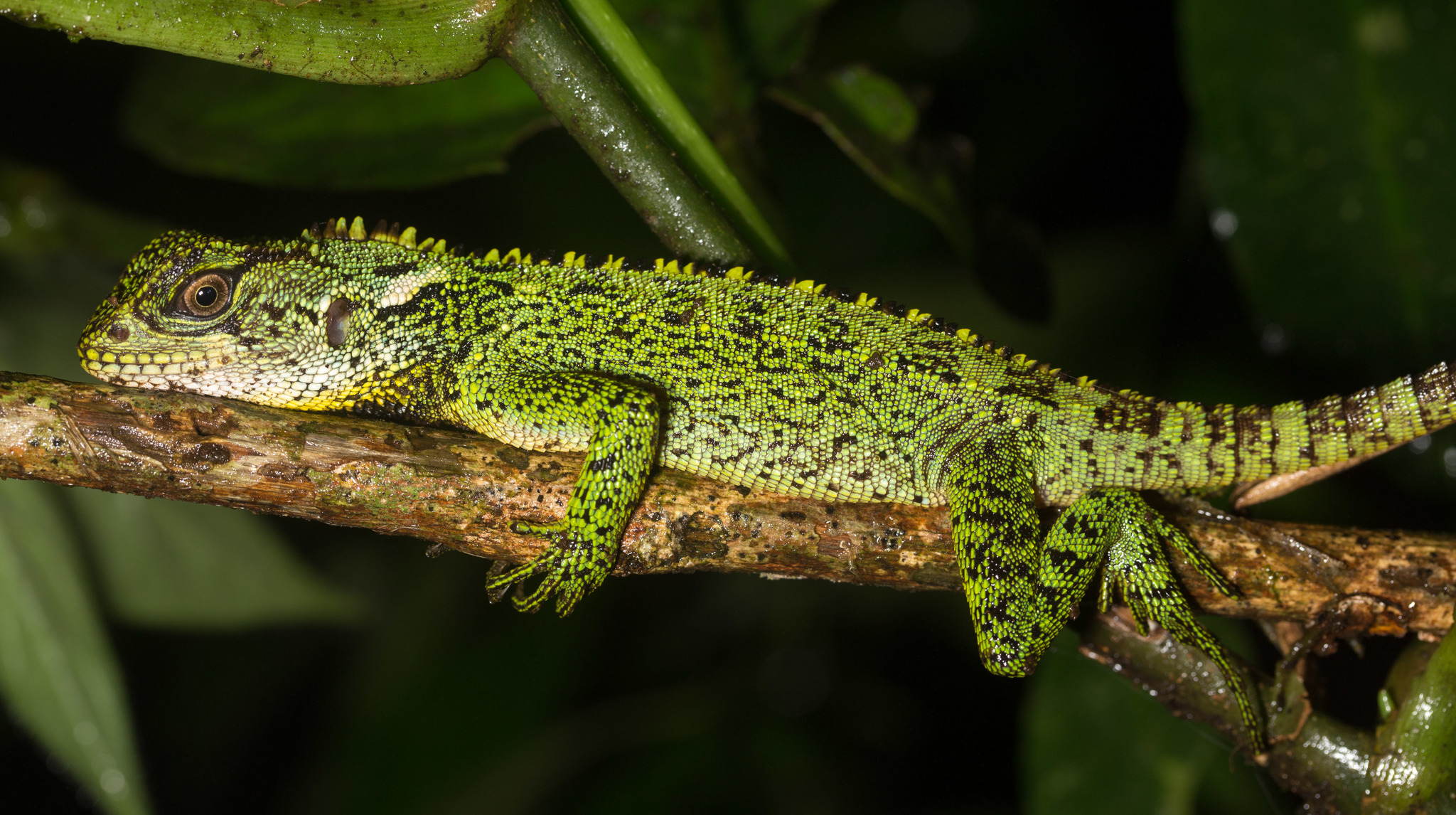
In Ecuador

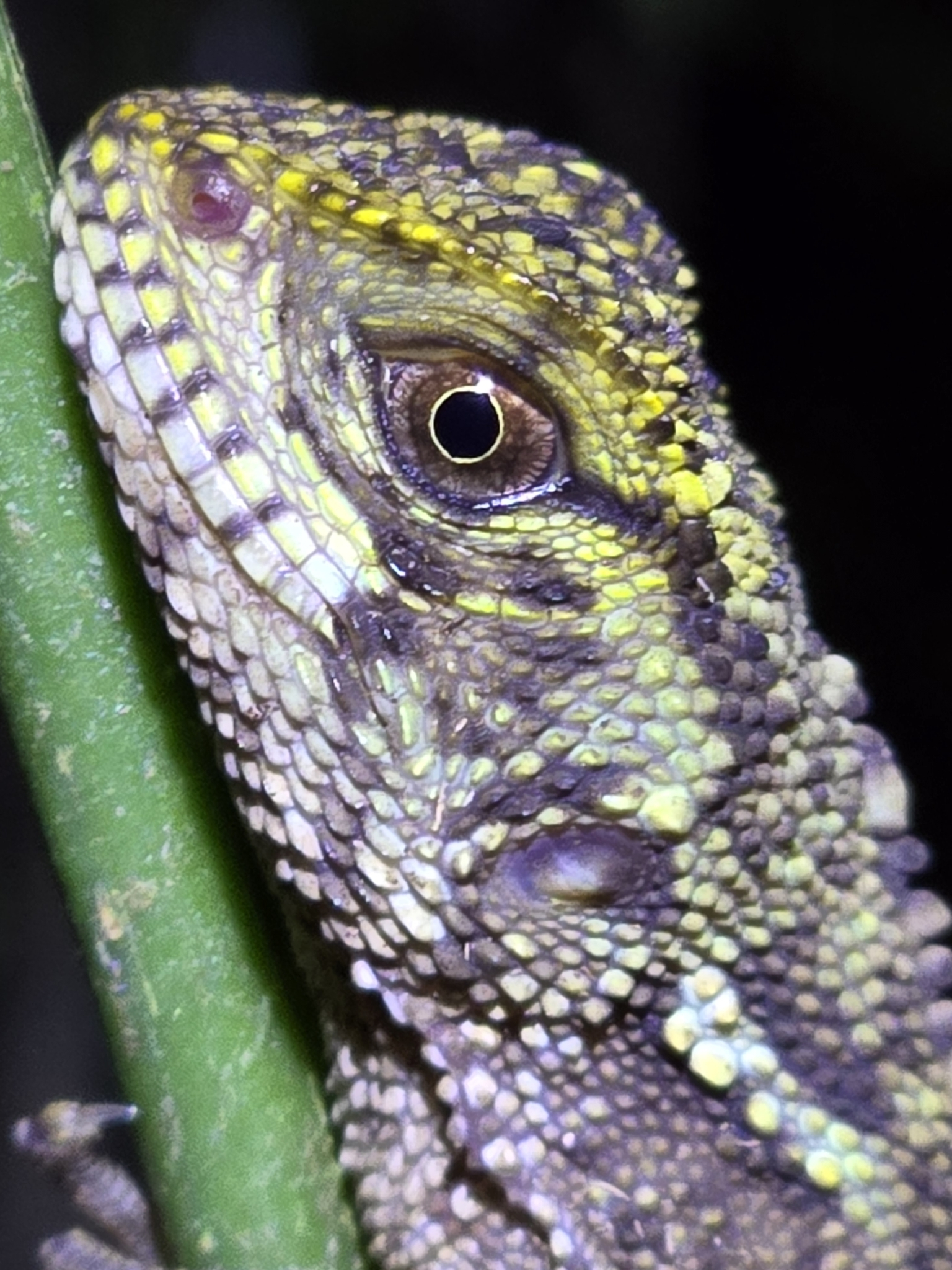
In Ecuador
