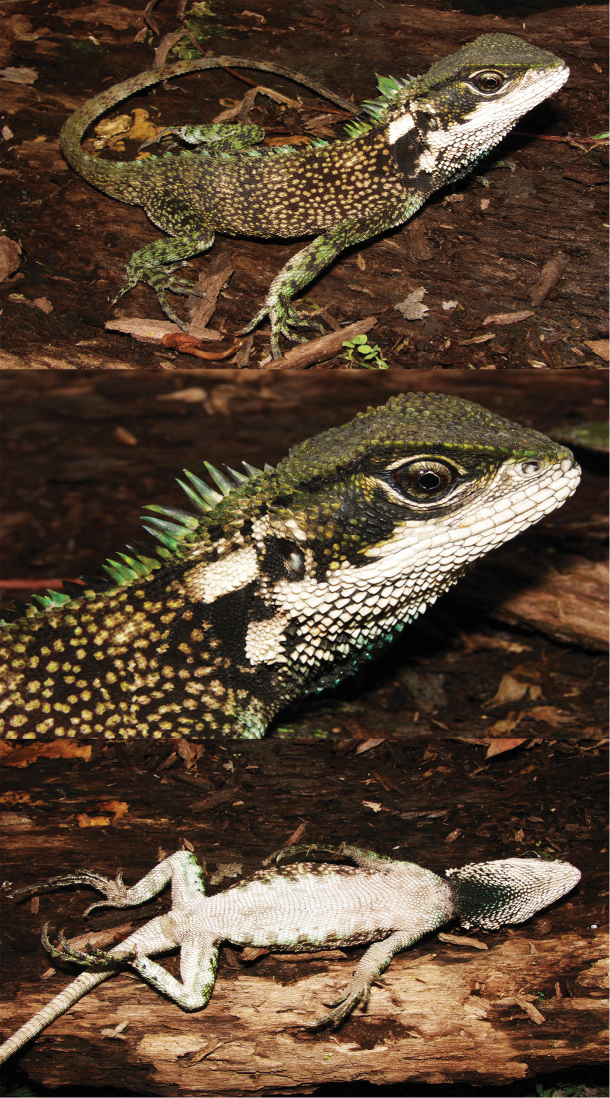

Scientific classification
- Kingdom: Animalia
- Phylum: Chordata
- Class: Reptilia
- Order: Squamata
- Suborder: Iguania
- Family: Hoplocercidae
- Genus: Enyalioides
- Species: E. sophiarothschildae

Binomial name
- Enyalioides sophiarothschildae Torres-Carvajal, Venegas & de Queiroz, 2015

= Enyalioides sophiarothschildae =

Species of lizard

Enyalioides sophiarothschildae, or the Rothschild's woodlizard, is a species of lizards in the family Hoplocercidae. It is endemic to the Amazonian slopes of the Cordillera Central in northeastern Peru. It differs from its congeneric species by possessing homogeneous (size) caudal scales on each caudal segment, a white gular region that has a black patch as well as turquoise scales in males, and immaculate white labials and chin.

== Taxonomy ==
Enyalioides sophiarothschildae was formally described in 2015 based on an adult male specimen collected from the La Cueva-Añazco Pueblo trail along the Río Lejía, in the Department of San Martín, Peru. The species is named after Sophia Rothschild in recognition of her financial support for CORBIDI's herpetological collection through the BIOPAT program. The species has the English common name Rothschild's woodlizard and the Spanish common name lagartija de palo de Rothschild.

== Description ==
The holotype adult male has a dark green head with a large black blotch between the eye and the tympanum. The loreal region, nasal scale, labials and chin are white, with a white blotch on the posterior end of the mandible. The neck is greenish-brown on top and dark brown on the sides, with a white rhomboidal blotch extending longitudinally from the tympanum to the scapular region. The dorsum is dark brown with scattered green scales and pale spots. The limbs are dark brown with green transverse bands and the tail is dark green with scattered dark brown marks. The vertebral crest has intermixed green and dark brown scales. The throat is white with a black posteromedial patch bearing scattered turquoise scales and the chest is grayish-white with a turquoise tone anteriorly. The belly is grayish-white with scattered, faint, pale brown blotches. The underside of the limbs is grayish-white, with a longitudinal faint turquoise stripe along the thighs, and the tail is grayish-white. The iris has a dark brown center and silver periphery, with dark brown reticulations. There is a silver ring around the pupil. One male specimen differs from the holotype in having some scattered dark brown blotches on the throat.

Enyalioides sophiarothschildae can be distinguished from other species of Enyalioides, except for E. laticeps, by having caudal scales that are relatively homogeneous in size on each caudal segment. Enyalioides sophiarothschildae differs from E. laticeps in males having white throats with a black medial patch scattered with turquoise scales, males having grayish-white chest with a turquoise tone, and labials and chin being immaculate white.

== Distribution and habitat ==
Enyalioides sophiarothschildae is known from the northeastern slopes of the Cordillera Central in Peru between 1600–1700 m. This species is only known from two adjacent localities, the trail to La Cueva-Añasco Pueblo in the drainage of the Lejía River and El Dorado in the drainage of the Blanco River, both tributaries of the Huallabamba River in the northern part of the Huallaga River basin. This area corresponds to the Selva Alta and Yungas ecoregions. Individuals of Enyalioides sophiarothschildae have been seen during the day in primary forest. One specimen was found crossing a trail and tried to hide between the roots of a large tree when approached, while another climbed up a tree three meters above the ground. A third specimen was found sitting on a big root.
