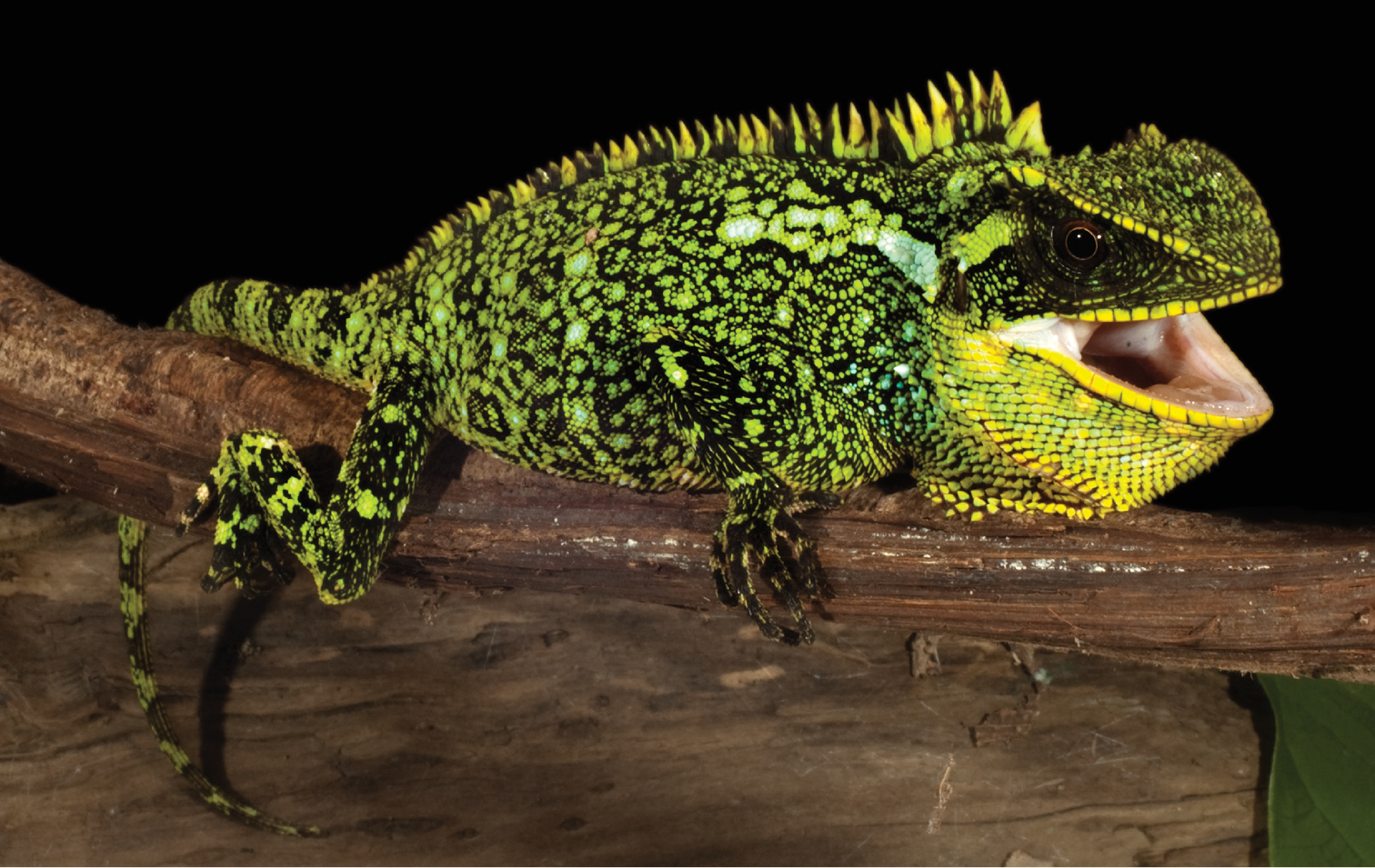
- Adult female

Scientific classification
- Kingdom: Animalia
- Phylum: Chordata
- Class: Reptilia
- Order: Squamata
- Suborder: Iguania
- Family: Hoplocercidae
- Genus: Enyalioides
- Species: E. altotambo

Binomial name
- Enyalioides altotambo Torres-Carvajal, Venegas & de Queiroz, 2015

= Enyalioides altotambo =

Species of lizard

Enyalioides altotambo, the Alto Tambo woodlizard, is a species of lizards in the family Hoplocercidae. It is endemic to the tropical northwestern Andes in Ecuador. It is named after its type locality, Alto Tambo in the Esmeraldas Province. It differs from its congeneric species by possessing smooth and homogeneous (size) dorsal scales, a brown iris, and lacking circular and keeled scales on its flanks.

== Taxonomy ==
Specimens of Enyalioides lizards from the locality where E. altotambo was collected were previously referred to Enyalioides oshaughnessyi. A 2009 phylogenetic study found “E. oshaughnessyi” to be paraphyletic relative to E. touzeti, with a 2011 study noted that specimens of “E. oshaughnessyi” from Alto Tambo differed from other populations in the color of their iris. A 2015 study finally separated Enyalioides altotambo as a distinct species based on morphological and genetic evidence.

Enyalioides altotambo was formally described in 2015 based on an adult male specimen collected from near Alto Tambo in the Esmeraldas Province, Ecuador. The specific epithet refers to the village on the Ibarra-San Lorenzo road where E. altotambo was discovered. The species has the English common name Alto Tambo woodlizard and Spanish common name lagartija de palo de Alto Tambo.

== Description ==
The holotype adult male had a light green head with a few black and dark brown scales. The superciliaries, canthals and labials are yellow. There is a wide bluish-cream blotch behind the tympanum and the pretympanic scales are bluish-cream. The background of the dorsum is light green with fine dark brown reticulation and scattered bluish cream scales. The vertebral scales are yellowish-green and the tail is green with incomplete dark brown rings. There are irregular black marks on the limbs covering most of hands and feet. The chin is white and the throat is bluish-cream, grading into yellowish-green anteriolaterally and bluish-green posteriorly. There is a posteromedial black patch. The underside of the body, limbs, and tail are dirty cream. The iris is brown with a golden ring around the pupil. It had a snout–vent length of 119 mm.

The only known females is similar to the male in its coloration and scalation, although larger, with a snout–vent length of 134 mm. It lacks a black gular patch and lacks a longer pale postympanic stripe, a yellow chin, and a yellow throat. It also had more projected scales on the lateral edge of the skull roof and vertebral crest, but this may be due to the difference in age of the two specimens.

Enyalioides altotambo differs from all other species of Enyalioides, except for E. oshaughnessyi, in having dorsal scales that are both smooth and homogeneous in size. It can be distinguished from E. oshaughnessyi by a combination of its brown irises, strongly projected scales on lateral edge of skull roof, light green spots on the dorsum, homogenously-sized scales on the flanks, pale postympanic stripe on the sides of the neck, no enlarged scales on the underside of the thighs, and the black patch on the throat being restricted instead of extending to the sides to form a bar.

== Distribution and habitat ==
Enyalioides altotambo is only known from two adjacent localities at 620–645 m in the Chocoan rainforests of northwestern Ecuador. One female was found at in the evening with its head facing up on a tree trunk.

== Gallery ==
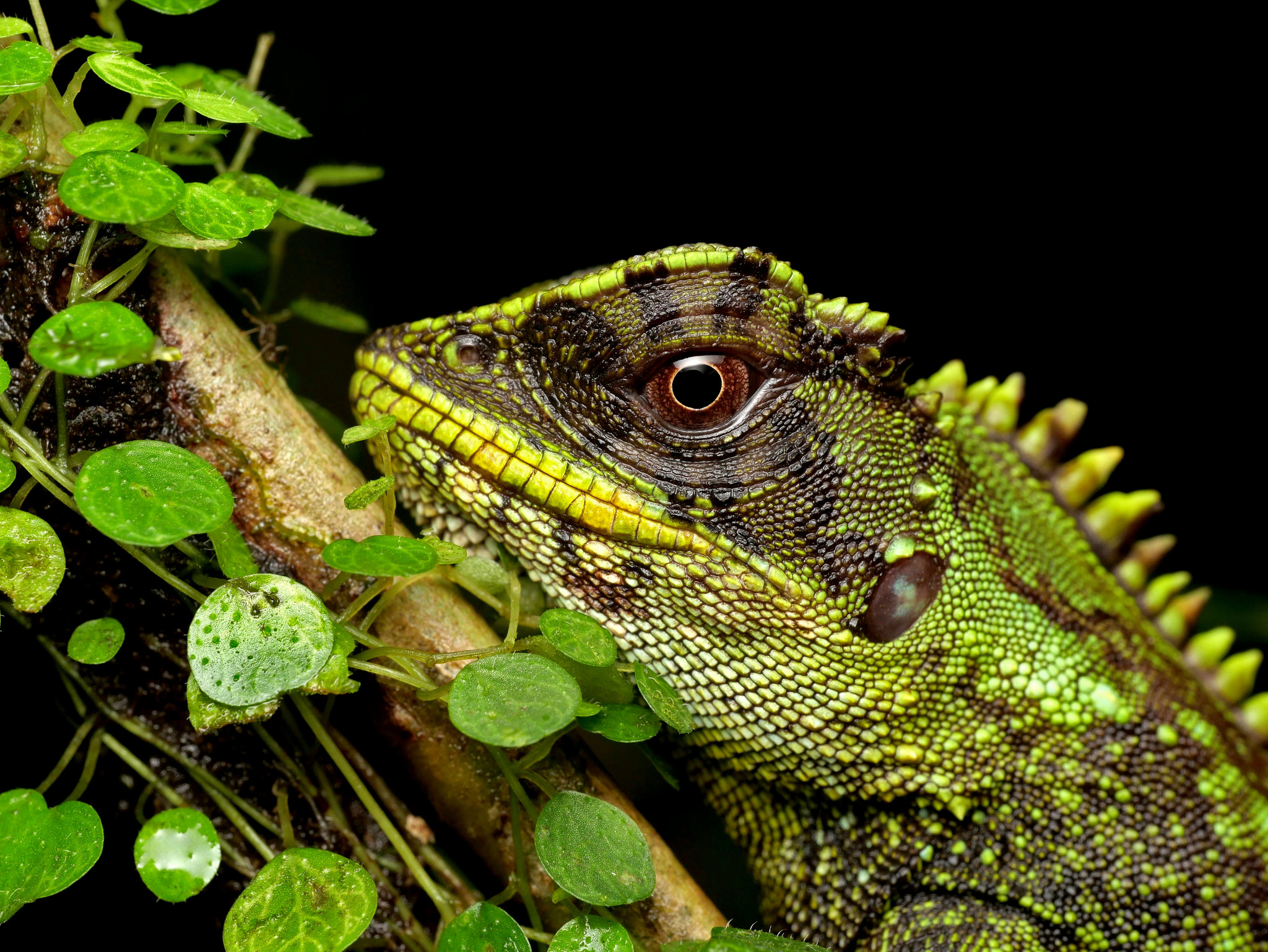

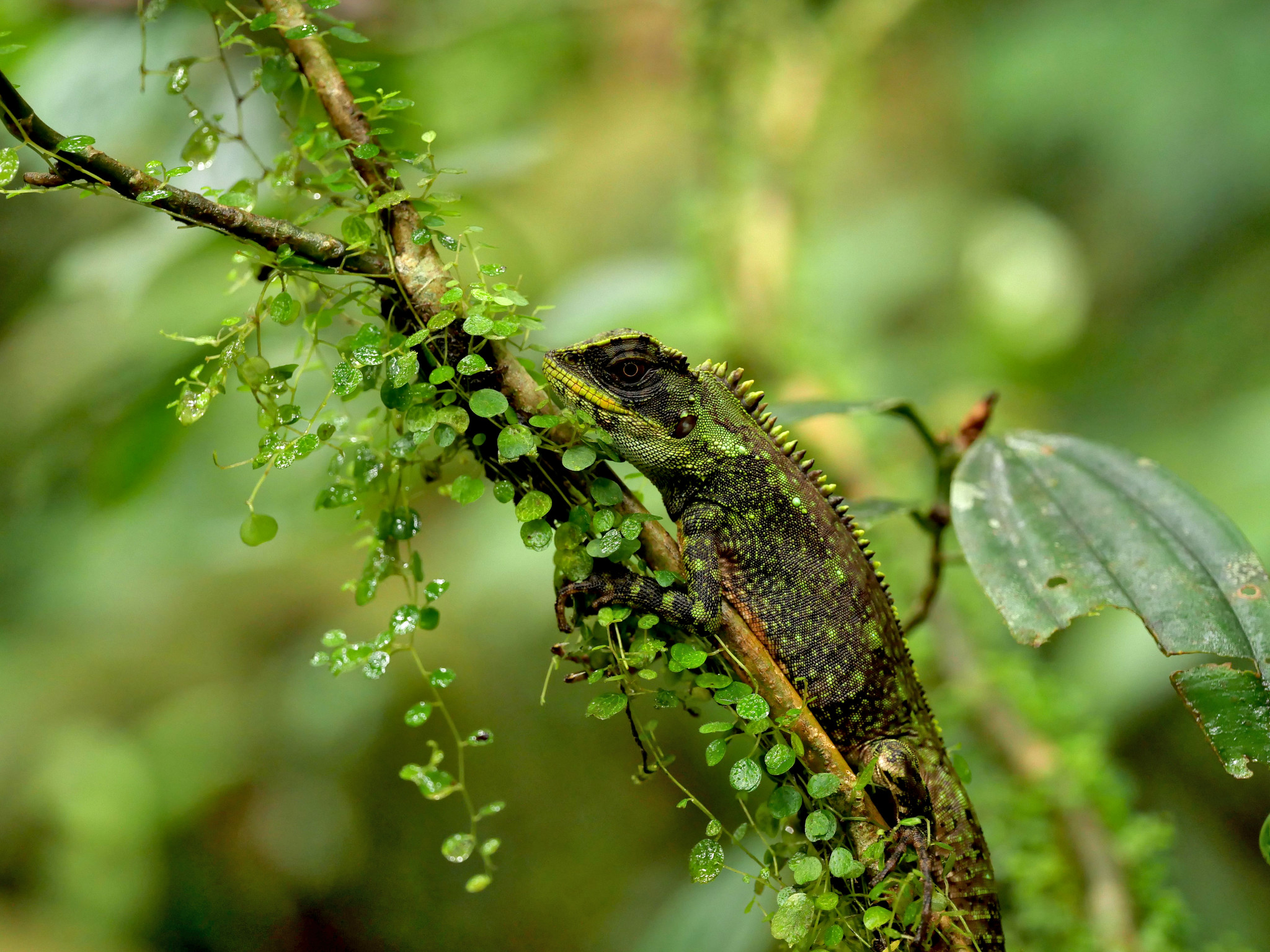

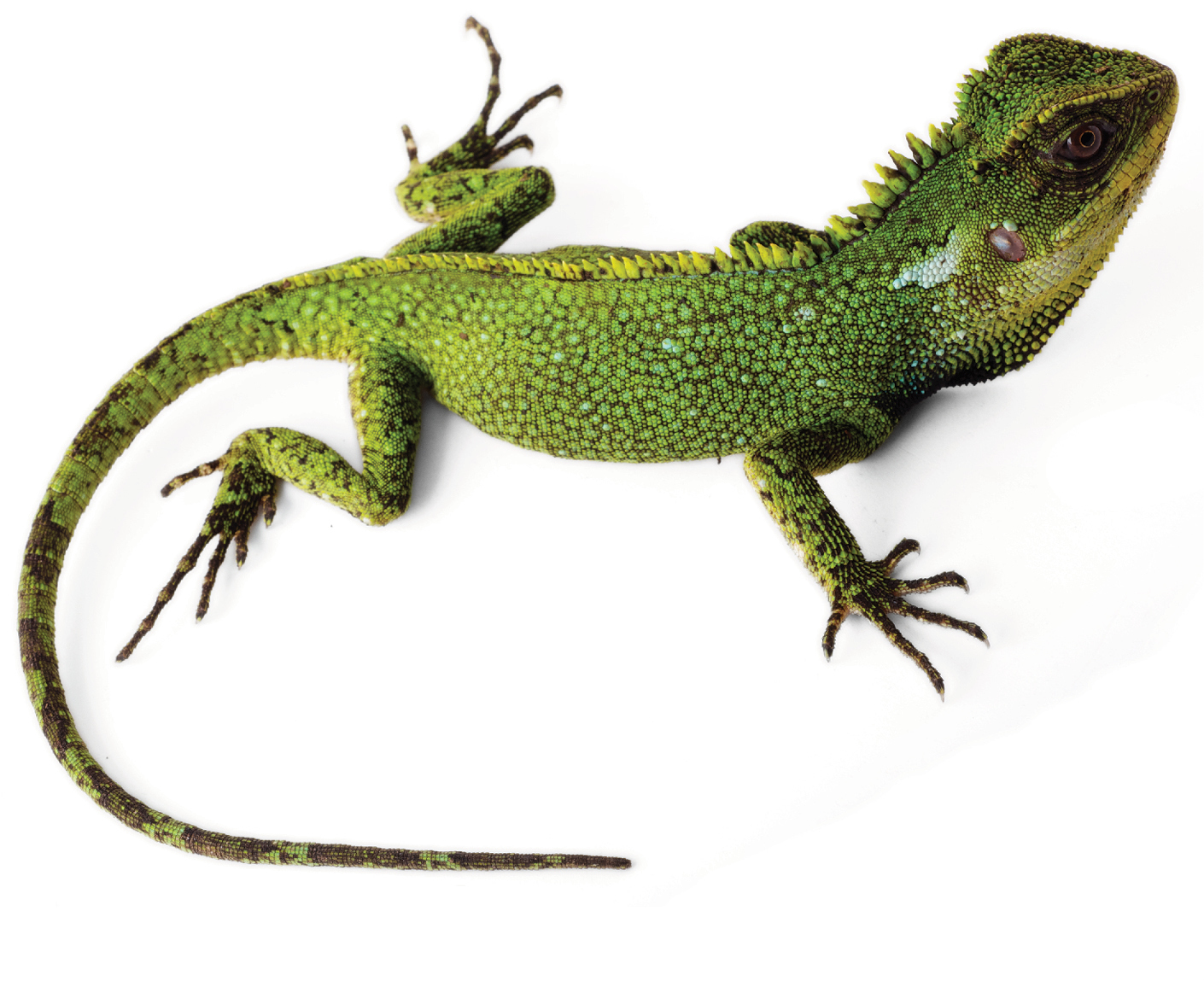
Holotype (adult male)
