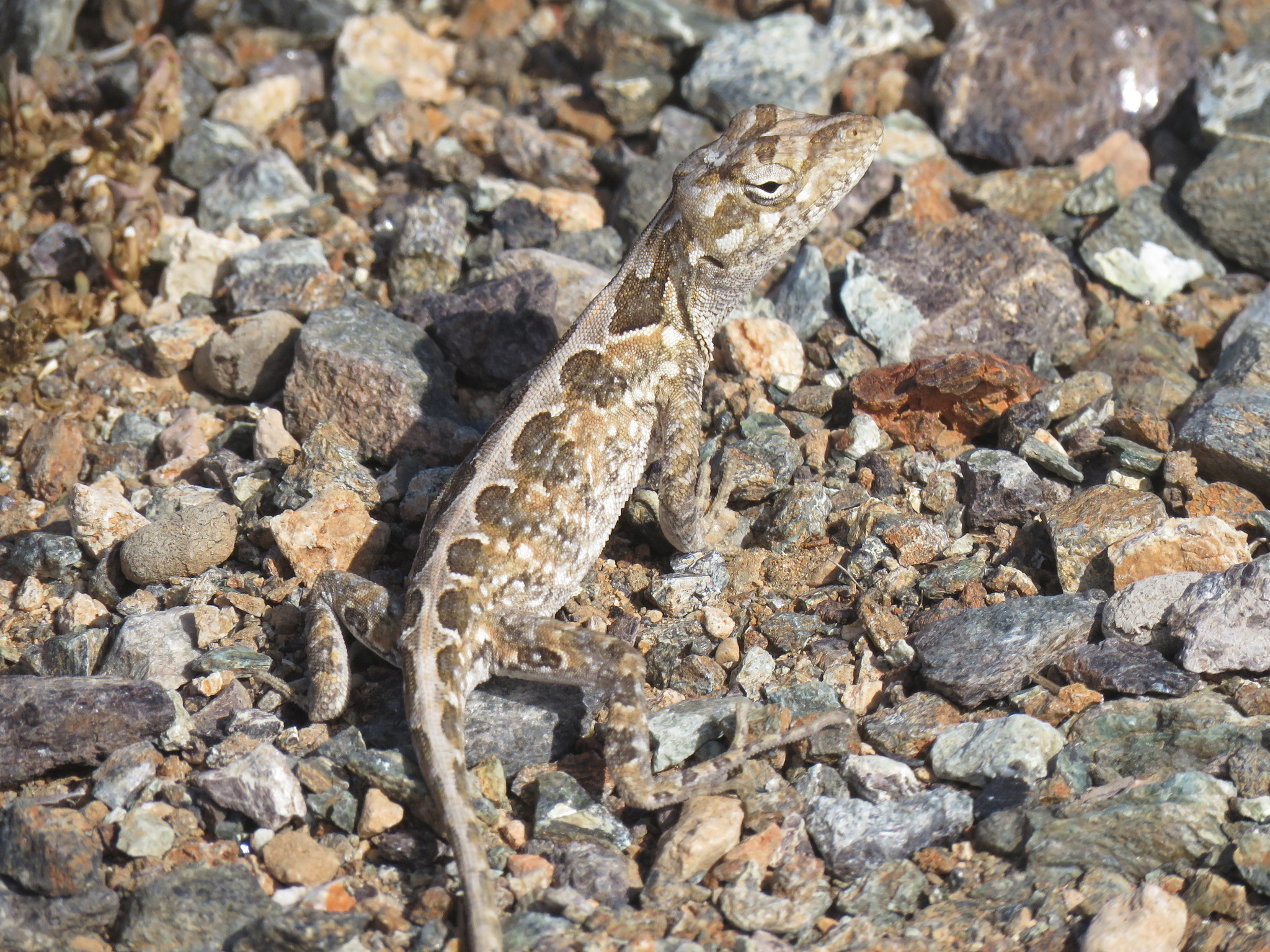
- Anolis onca (2021)

Conservation status
- Least Concern (IUCN 3.1)

Scientific classification
- Kingdom: Animalia
- Phylum: Chordata
- Class: Reptilia
- Order: Squamata
- Suborder: Iguania
- Family: Anolidae
- Genus: Anolis
- Species: A. onca

Binomial name
- Anolis onca (O'Shaughnessy, 1875)

Synonyms
- Norops onca O'Shaughnessy, 1875; Tropidodactylus onca (O'Shaughnessy, 1875)

= Anolis onca =

Species of lizard

Anolis onca, the bulky anole, is a species of lizard in the family Dactyloidae. The species is found in Colombia and Venezuela.
