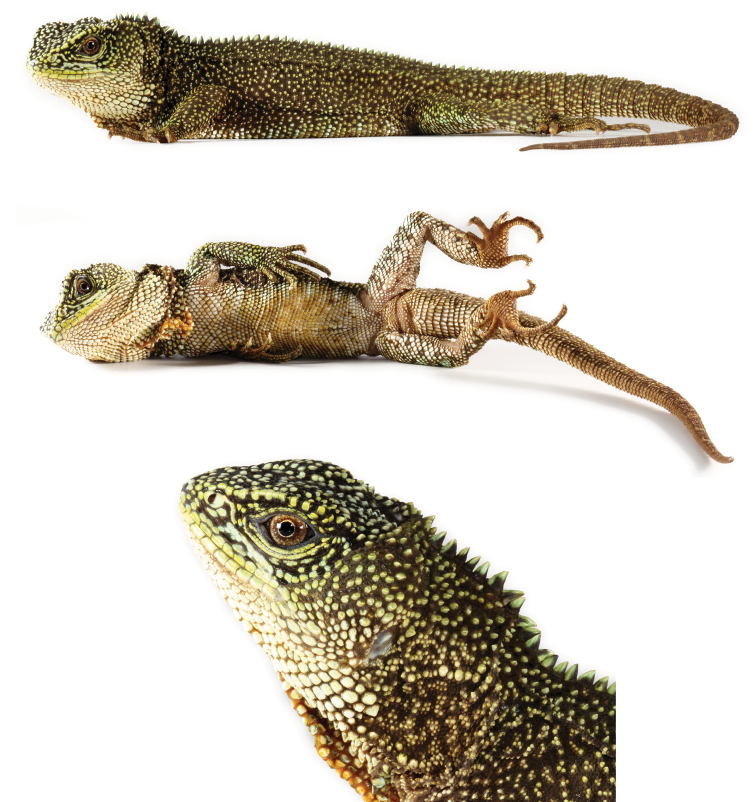
- Holotype, adult male

Scientific classification
- Kingdom: Animalia
- Phylum: Chordata
- Class: Reptilia
- Order: Squamata
- Suborder: Iguania
- Family: Hoplocercidae
- Genus: Enyalioides
- Species: E. anisolepis

Binomial name
- Enyalioides anisolepis Torres-Carvajal, Venegas & de Queiroz, 2015

= Enyalioides anisolepis =

Species of lizard

Enyalioides anisolepis, also known as the rough-scaled woodlizard, is a species of lizards in the family Hoplocercidae. It is known from the Amazonian slopes of the Andes in southern Ecuador and northern Peru. It differs from its congeneric species by possessing scattered, projecting large scales on its dorsum, flanks, and hind limbs; a well-developed vertebral crest, with vertebrals on its neck being about three times in size compared to those between the animal's hind limbs.

== Taxonomy ==
Enyalioides anisolepis was formally described in 2015 based on an adult male specimen collected from the eastern bank of the Mayo river near the city of Zumba in the Zamora-Chinchipe Province, Ecuador. The specific epithet anisolepis derives from the Greek words anisos, meaning 'unequal', and lepis, meaning 'scale'. It refers to the heterogeneous scales on the dorsum, flanks, and hind limbs of the woodlizard. The species has the English common name rough-scaled woodlizard and the Spanish common name lagartija de palo de escamas ásperas.

== Description ==
In the adult male holotype, the sides and top of the head have scattered black, brown, and pale green scales. The labials are greenish-cream, while the dorsum is brownish-green with scattered pale green scales. The vertebral crest is pale green, with a dark brown base to each vertebral scale. The gular scales are cream, with gray skin between them. There is an orange patch on center of the throat. The chest and belly are cream with a pale orange tint, while the underside of the limbs is dirty-cream with scattered brown spots. The underside of the tail is dirty-cream proximally and brown distally. The center of the iris is dark brown while the periphery is pale brown with dark brown reticulations. There is a thin golden ring around the pupil. Other adult males are very similar in color to the holotype, but have dark spots on the belly. One subadult male had scattered black flecks on the throat.

The species shows marked sexual dichromatism in background color, with males being green and females being brown. Adult females and juveniles have similar colors. The dorsum is dark or pale brown, with dark or pale brown flanks with scattered dark markings. There is a diagonal subocular dark stripe extending from the subocular region to the commissure of the mouth. There is a faint cream stripe extending longitudinally from the tympanum to the scapular region. The limbs have faint brown transverse bands and the underside of the body is largely pale brown or cream, with scattered dark spots on the belly and thighs. Juveniles also generally have dark brown transverse bands on the dorsum, dark flecks on the head, and transverse rows of dark brown blotches on the flanks. Some specimens have a bright orange tint on the neck and sides of the head.

Enyalioides anisolepis can be distinguished from other species of Enyalioides, except for E. heterolepis, by having conical dorsal head scales and scattered, projecting, large scales on the dorsum, flanks, and hind limbs, which are conspicuous in adults of both sexes. Besides occurring on the opposite side of the Andes, E. anisolepis differs from E. heterolepis in having fewer vertebral scales, a higher vertebral crest with the vertebrals on neck at least three times higher than those between the hind limbs, scattered dark spots on belly in juveniles and adults of both sexes, tail in adult males moderately compressed laterally, and showing marked sexual dimorphism. The only other species of Enyalioides with scattered, projecting dorsal scales is E. cofanorum, which differs from E. anisolepis in lacking projecting scales on the hind limbs, its smaller size, and lack of sexual dimorphism.

== Distribution and habitat ==
Enyalioides anisolepis is known to occur between 724–1742 m on the Amazonian slopes of the Andes in southern Ecuador and northern Peru. It is known from Zamora-Chinchipe in extreme southern Ecuador and Cajamarca in northern Peru. Most specimens were found sleeping at night 0.2–1.5 m above ground on stems, leaves, and tree roots in primary and secondary forests. Most specimens were also within 5 m of small streams.
