= Enyalioides peruvianus =

Conservation status
- Least Concern (IUCN 3.1)

Scientific classification
- Kingdom: Animalia
- Phylum: Chordata
- Class: Reptilia
- Order: Squamata
- Suborder: Iguania
- Family: Hoplocercidae
- Genus: Enyalioides
- Species: E. peruvianus

Binomial name
- Enyalioides peruvianus Köhler, 2003

Species of lizard

Enyalioides peruvianus, known commonly as the Cenepa manticore, is a species of lizard in the family Hoplocercidae. The species is endemic to Peru.
