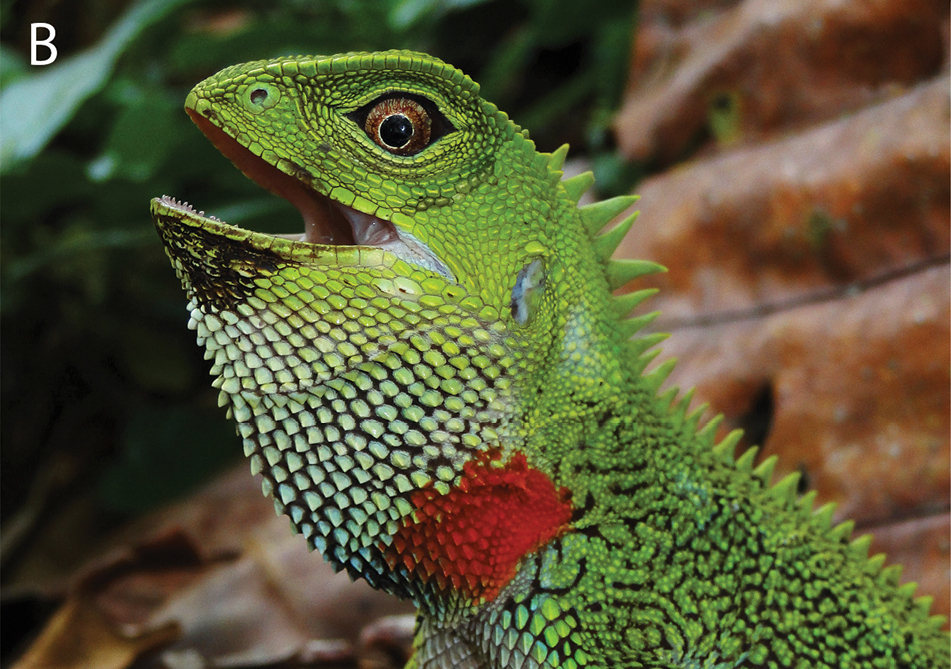
- Adult male

Conservation status
- Least Concern (IUCN 3.1)

Scientific classification
- Kingdom: Animalia
- Phylum: Chordata
- Class: Reptilia
- Order: Squamata
- Suborder: Iguania
- Family: Hoplocercidae
- Genus: Enyalioides
- Species: E. rudolfarndti

Binomial name
- Enyalioides rudolfarndti Venegas, Duran, Landauro, & Lujan, 2011

= Enyalioides rudolfarndti =

Lizard

Enyalioides rudolfarndti is a species of lizards in the genus Enyalioides known from Peru.
