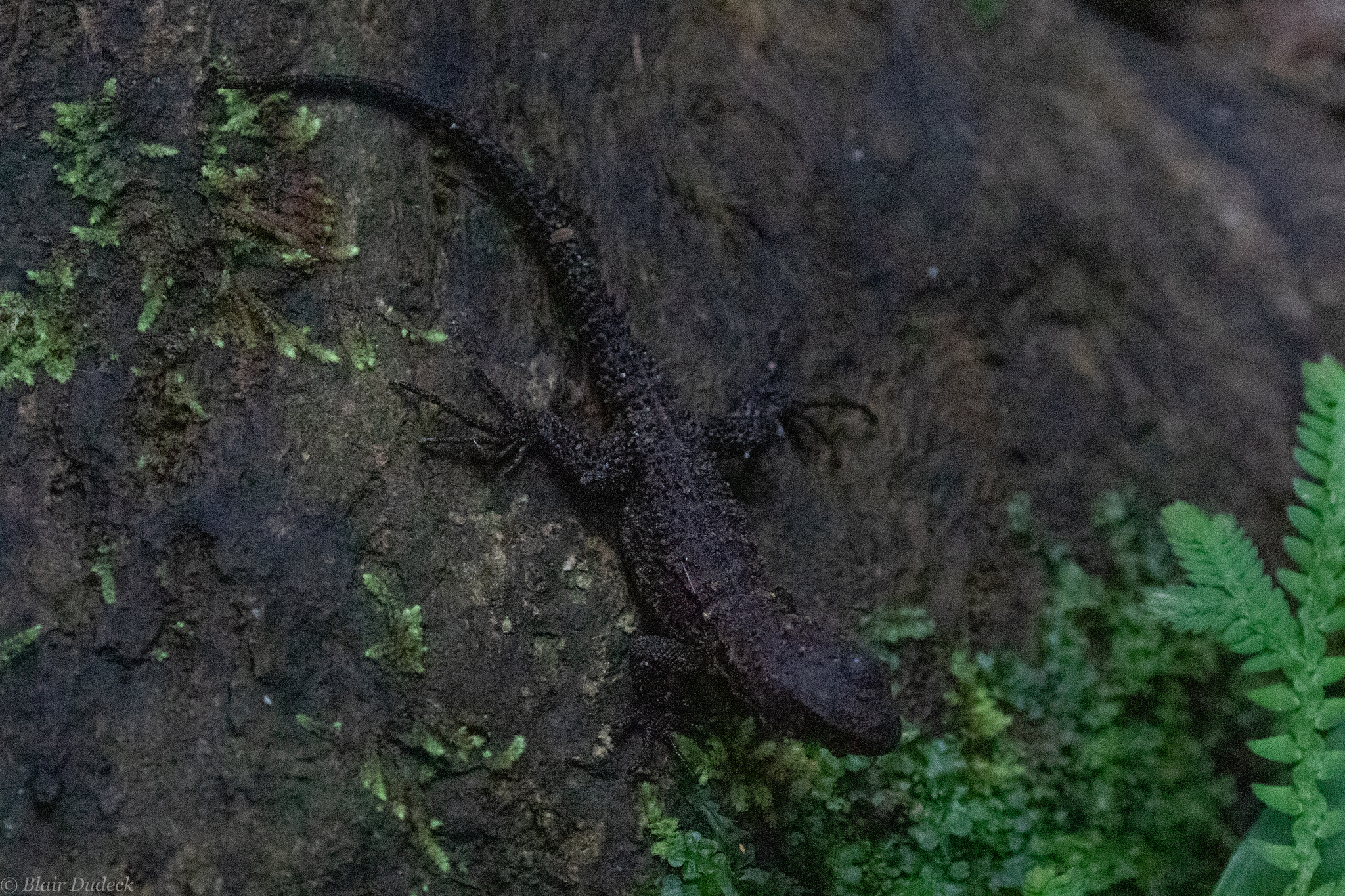

Conservation status
- Vulnerable (IUCN 3.1)

Scientific classification
- Kingdom: Animalia
- Phylum: Chordata
- Class: Reptilia
- Order: Squamata
- Suborder: Iguania
- Family: Hoplocercidae
- Genus: Enyalioides
- Species: E. annularis

Binomial name
- Enyalioides annularis (O'Shaughnessy, 1881)

Synonyms
- Hoplocercus annularis O'Shaughnessy, 1881; Morunasaurus annularis — Dunn, 1933

= Enyalioides annularis =

Species of lizard

Enyalioides annularis, known commonly as the ringed manticore or the ringed spinytail iguana, is a species of lizard in the family Hoplocercidae. The species is endemic to north-western South America.

== Description ==
Males grow to 137 mm (5.4 in) and females to 118 mm (4.6 in) in snout–vent length.

== Distribution and habitat ==
E. annularis is found in southern Colombia and eastern Ecuador on the eastern slopes of the Andes and adjacent lowlands. It inhabits tropical foothill forest and lower montane wet forest at elevations of 214–1,100 m (702–3,609 ft) above sea level. It is a burrowing species, excavating burrows about 3 m (9.8 ft) long and 60 cm (24 in) deep in the forest floor.

== Reproduction ==
E. annularis is oviparous, laying 2–4 eggs.
