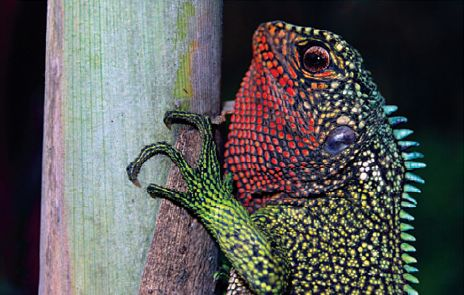
- Adult male

Conservation status
- Vulnerable (IUCN 3.1)

Scientific classification
- Kingdom: Animalia
- Phylum: Chordata
- Class: Reptilia
- Order: Squamata
- Suborder: Iguania
- Family: Hoplocercidae
- Genus: Enyalioides
- Species: E. rubrigularis

Binomial name
- Enyalioides rubrigularis Torres-Carvajal, de Queiroz, & Etheridge, 2009

= Enyalioides rubrigularis =

Species of lizard

The red-throated woodlizard (Enyalioides rubrigularis) is a species of reptile in the genus Enyalioides, native to Ecuador and Peru.

== Taxonomy ==
Enyalioides rubrigularis was formally described in 2019 based on an adult male specimen collected from near Piuntza in the Zamora-Chinchipe Province, Ecuador. The name rubrigularis derives from the Latin words ruber, meaning red, and gula, meaning throat. It refers to the species' characteristic orange or reddish throat and chin.

== Description ==
The adult male holotype has mostly green or yellow scales on the top and side of the head, with black margins forming a reticulate pattern. Some scales on the head are entirely black, while the labials and mental scale are orange with black margins. The rostral scale is green medially and black laterally and the gular scales are orange with black margins. A few of the lateral gulars are green or yellow. The skin between the gulars is black and there is no black gular patch. There are six enlarged greenish-cream scales that form a distinct spot posterior to the tympanum. The paraverterbrals and caudals are green or dark brown and the flanks are mottled with lemon-green scales. The dorsal limb scales are light green, some with dark brown margins. The underside of the body is white towards the center and light green laterally, with irregular light green stripes projecting medially. The lining of mouth whitish-cream. The iris is light brown peripherally, with dark brown projections originating from the dark brown center. Other males differentiate from the holotype in having their green tones were replaced with yellow or brown tones. They can also have a dark brown to black reticulate pattern on dorsal and lateral aspects of body, black and red scales on the loreal and subocular regions, red labials with black margins, red gulars with black margins, and the dorsal surface of head black with green and yellow dots.

An adult female specimen had a light brown dorsum spotted with yellow scales. The dorsal background of the head is dark brown with scattered black scales. The labials are yellowish-green with grey margins and the enlarged pretympanic scale is yellow. There is a faint yellowish strip extending longitudinally from the tympanum to the scapular region. Each vertebral scale is yellow anteriorly and grey posteriorly. The throat is brown with a few scattered orange scales. The underside of the body is brownish-cream. The iris was copper with dark brown reticulations. Another female differed from this specimen in having a dark olive green dorsal background, a black stripe extending longitudinally from posterior margin of eye to dorsal margin of tympanum, a black stripe extending dorsolaterally from commissure of mouth to eye, and a yellowish-cream gular region with scattered black dots.

Enyalioides rubrigularis differs from all other species of Enyalioides, except for E. praestabilis, in having distinct caudal whorls, smooth or feebly keeled ventrals, fewer than 32 longitudinal rows of dorsals in a transverse line between dorsolateral crests at midbody, and in lacking projecting dorsal and limb scales. Males of rubrigularis can be distinguished from praestabilis by having larger scales on the ventral surface of the thighs, and by having gulars with black margins. The skin between gulars is black in some male specimens of praestabilis, but gulars lack black margins. In addition, gular scales in males of rubrigularis vary between bright orange and red, and there is no black mark on the gular region posteromedially; males of praestabilis have cream or yellow gular scales, and some specimens have a black patch covering the gular fold and posteromedial portion of the gular region. E. rubrigularis usually has two femoral pores, whereas praestabilis has normally one femoral pore.

== Distribution and habitat ==
Enyalioides rubrigularis inhabits rainforests on the eastern slopes of the Andes and the western slopes of Cordillera del Cóndor in southern Ecuador and northern Peru. It occurs at elevations of 1100–1460 m in the upper basins of the Zamora and Nangaritza rivers in the Ecuadorian province of Zamora-Chinchipe and in the Kutukú Mountains of Peru. Its type locality is surrounded by secondary forest, pasture, Tilapia ponds, and Rana catesbeiana bullfrog farms. Most specimens were found sleeping at night between 30 cm and 2.5 m above ground in secondary forest close to pasture. They were found with their heads facing up on vertical stems with diameters varying between 2–10 cm or lying horizontally on ferns with stems 2–3 cm wide. One juvenile was seen at 5 pm basking in the sun on the ground and ran quickly into a hole in the ground when approached.

== Conservation ==
Enyalioides rubrigularis is classified by the IUCN as being vulnerable, due to its fairly restricted range and ongoing habitat loss. The species is threatened by mining, deforestation, and road construction, and its population is thought to be decreasing. It occurs within the El Zarza Wildlife Refuge.

== Gallery ==
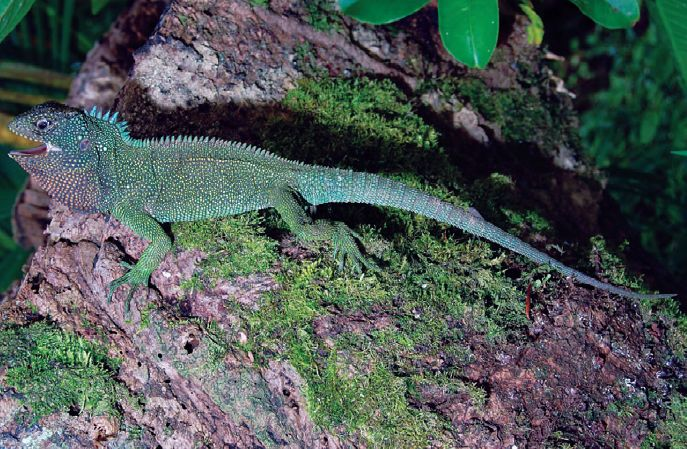
Holotype (adult male)

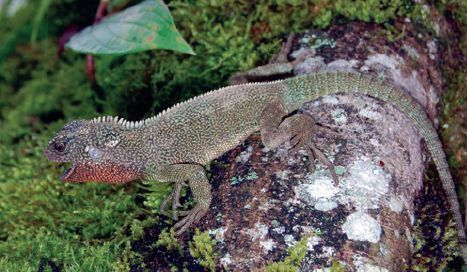
Adult male

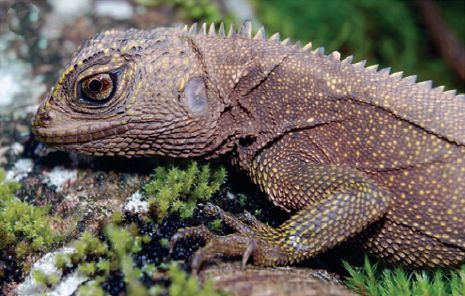
Adult female

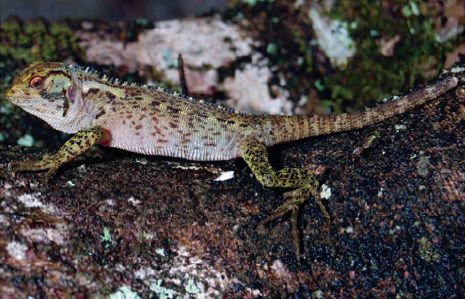
Juvenile
