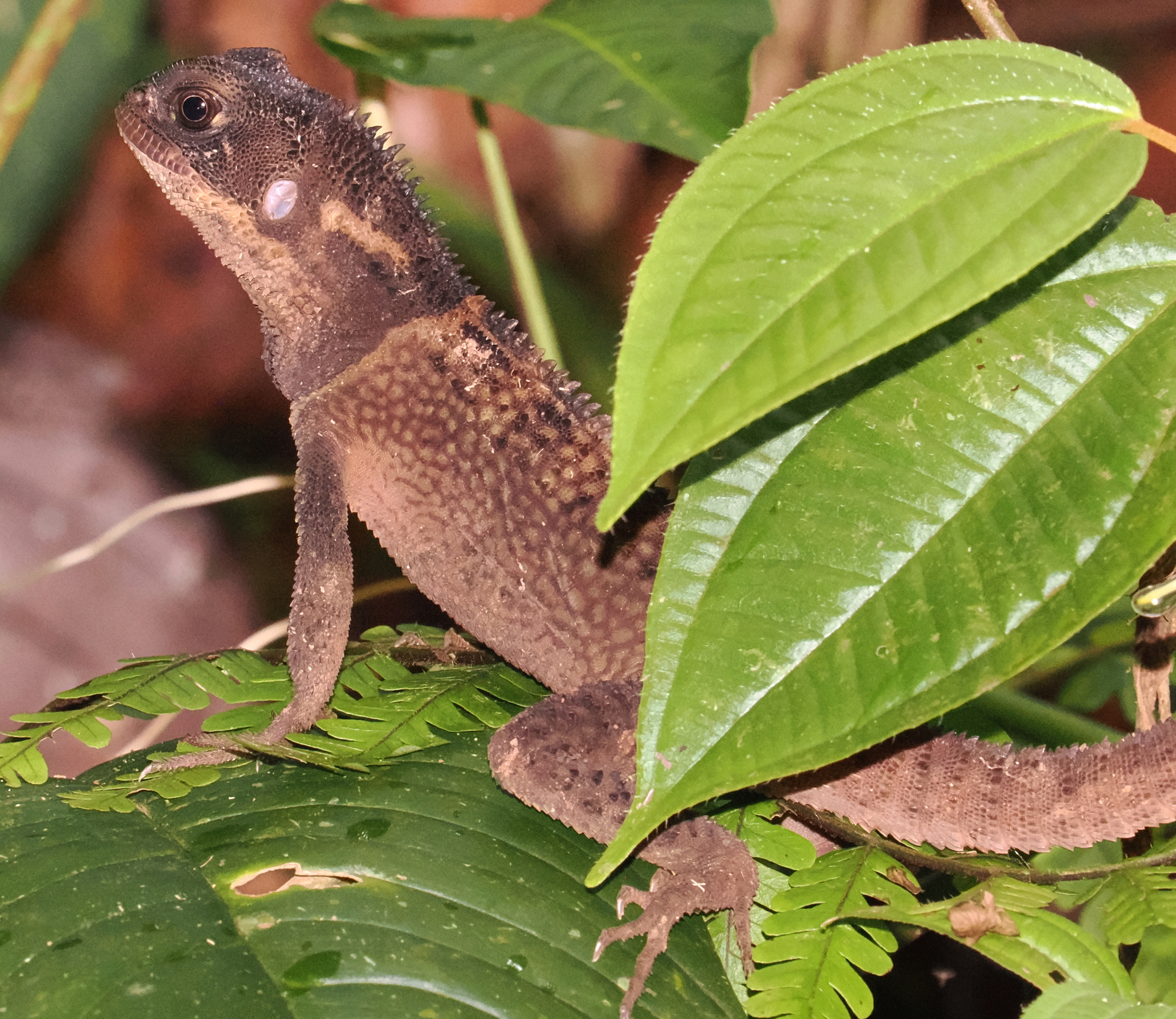
- In Colombia

Conservation status
- Least Concern (IUCN 3.1)

Scientific classification
- Kingdom: Animalia
- Phylum: Chordata
- Class: Reptilia
- Order: Squamata
- Suborder: Iguania
- Family: Hoplocercidae
- Genus: Enyalioides
- Species: E. heterolepis

Binomial name
- Enyalioides heterolepis (Bocourt, 1874)

= Enyalioides heterolepis =

Species of lizard

Enyalioides heterolepis, Bocourt's dwarf iguana, is a species of lizards in the genus Enyalioides, from Panama, Colombia, and Ecuador.

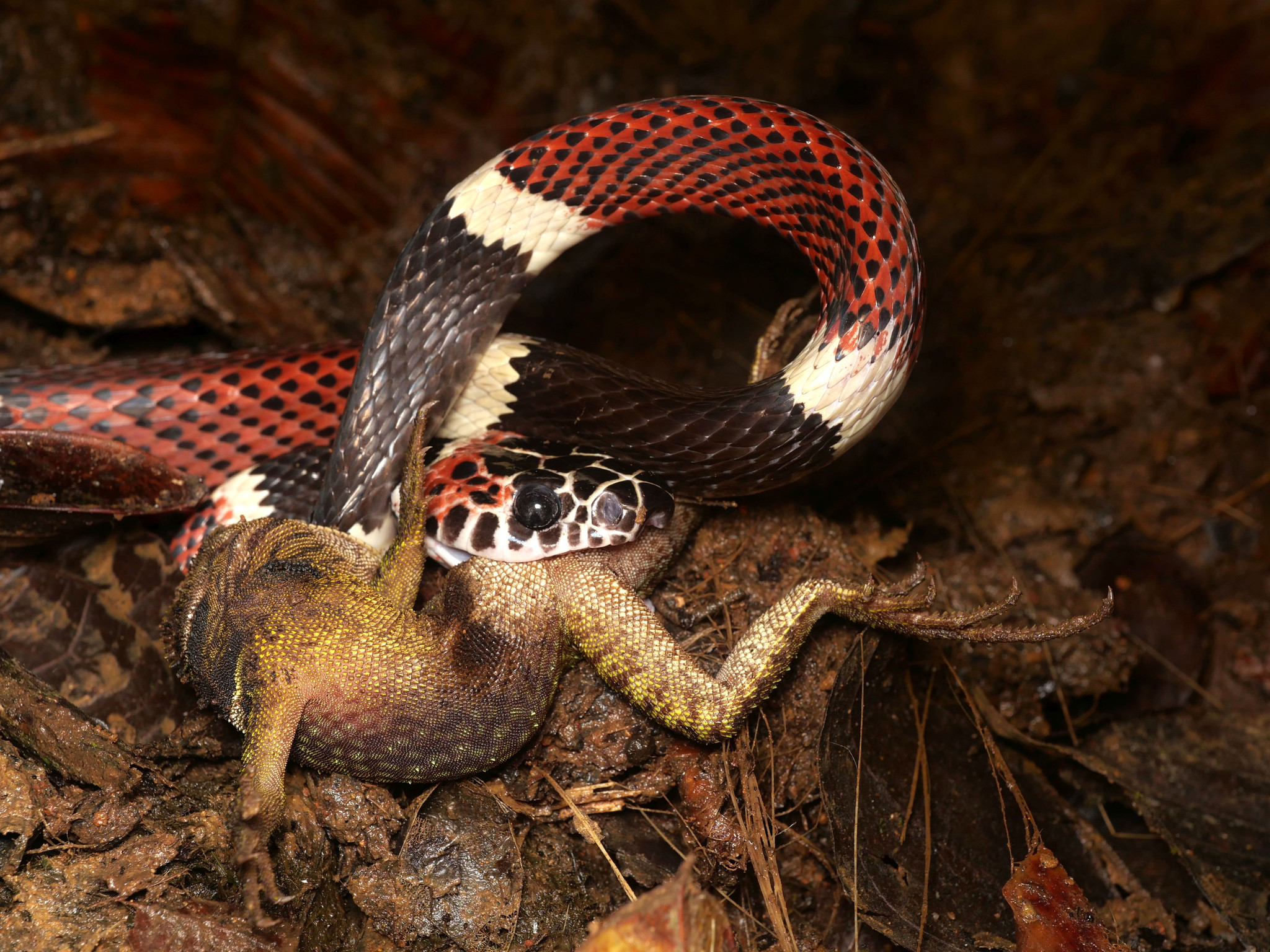
Being preyed on by a false tree coral snake.

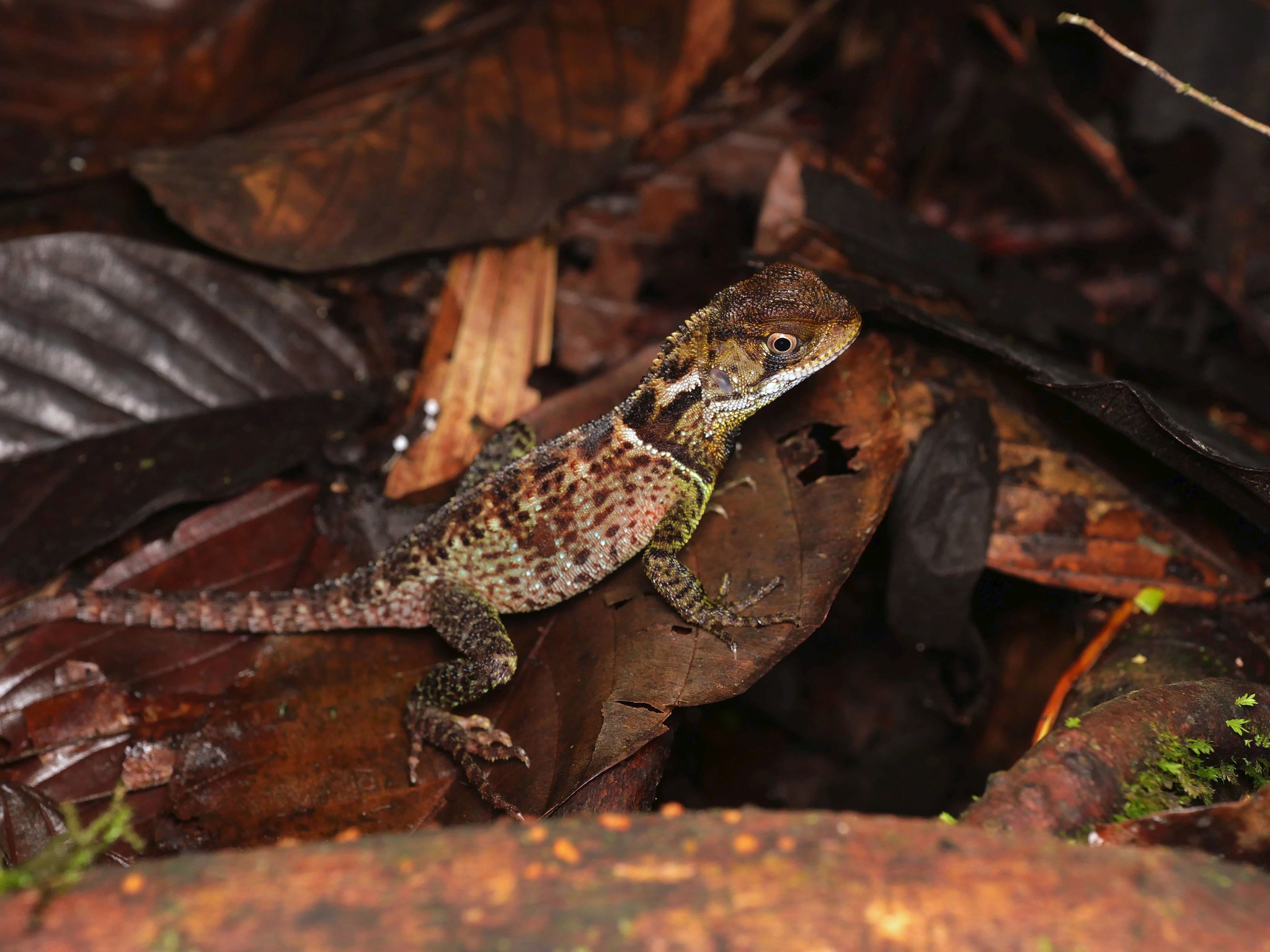
In Ecuador
