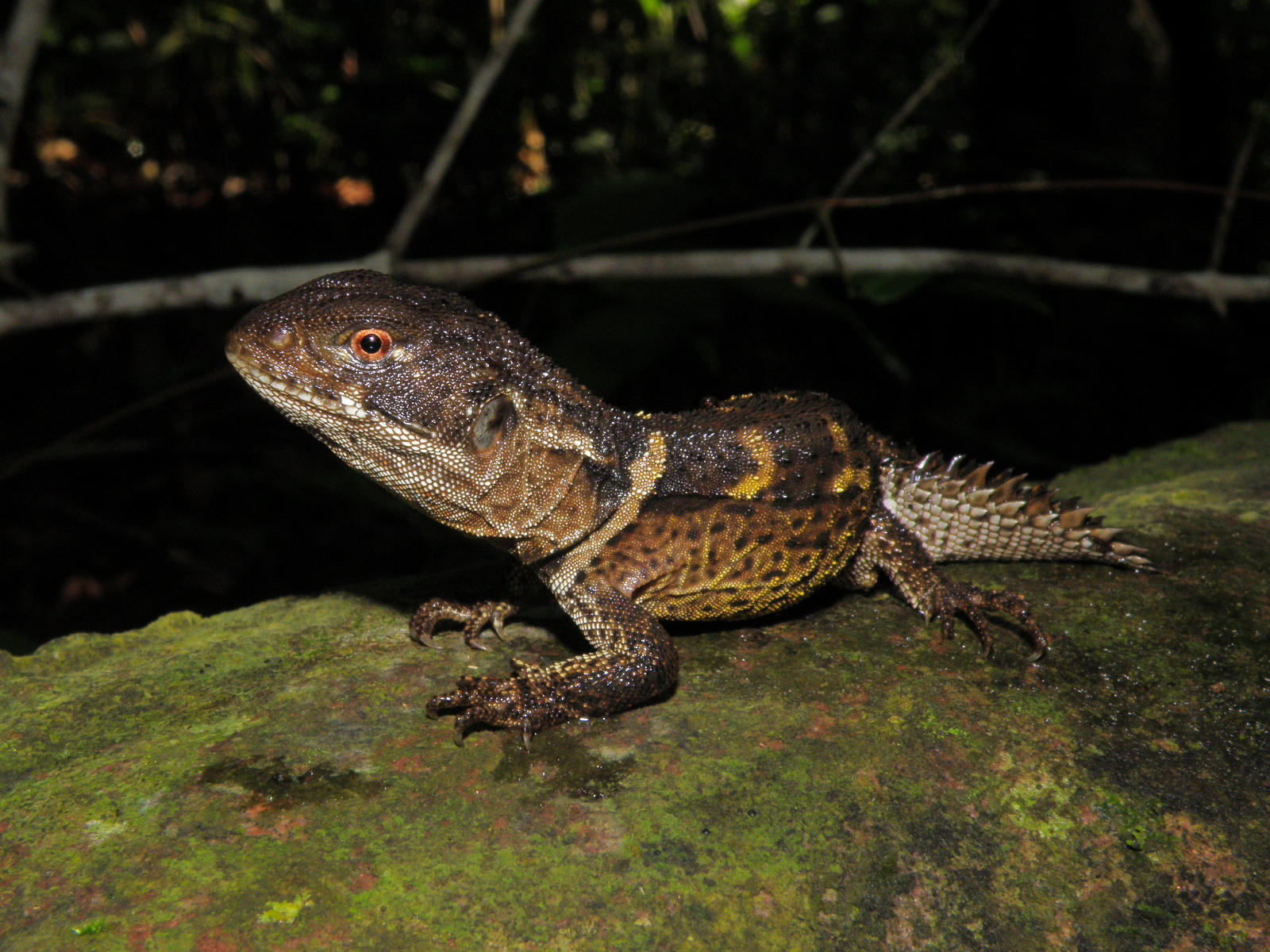

Scientific classification
- Kingdom: Animalia
- Phylum: Chordata
- Class: Reptilia
- Order: Squamata
- Suborder: Iguania
- Family: Hoplocercidae
- Genus: Hoplocercus; Fitzinger, 1843
- Species: H. spinosus

Binomial name
- Hoplocercus spinosus Fitzinger, 1843

= Spiny weapontail =

Genus of lizards

The spiny weapontail (Hoplocercus spinosus) is a species of lizard belonging to the monotypic genus Hoplocercus in the family Hoplocercidae. The species is found in the Cerrado and adjacent Cerrado–Amazon mosaics in Brazil and Bolivia.

== Taxonomy ==
H. spinosus is quite distantly related to the other members of Hoplocercidae, as it is believed to have diverged from these about 35 million years ago.

== Description ==
The spiny weapontail has a total length (including tail) of about 12–15 cm (4.5–6 in). As suggested by its name, it has a short, highly spiny tail (it is superficially similar to Uromastyx, Cachryx and the smaller species in Ctenosaura).

== Behavior ==
When disturbed, H. spinosus retreats to its burrow with its tail orientated towards the entrance. It is nocturnal.

== Diet ==
H. spinosus preys upon arthropods.

== Reproduction ==
H. spinosus is oviparous.
