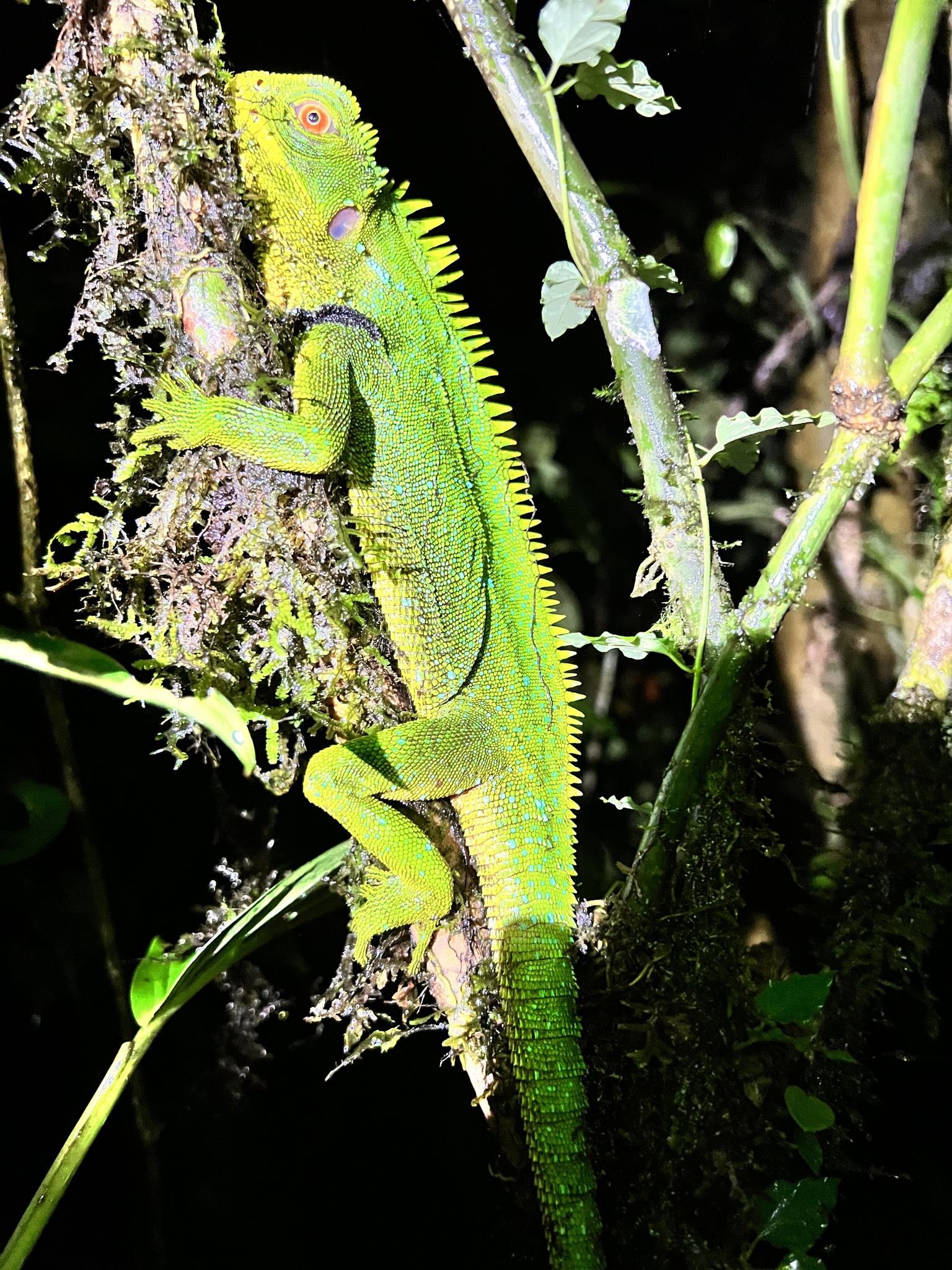
- In Ecuador

Conservation status
- Vulnerable (IUCN 3.1)

Scientific classification
- Kingdom: Animalia
- Phylum: Chordata
- Class: Reptilia
- Order: Squamata
- Suborder: Iguania
- Family: Hoplocercidae
- Genus: Enyalioides
- Species: E. oshaughnessyi

Binomial name
- Enyalioides oshaughnessyi (Boulenger, 1881)

Synonyms
- Enyalius oshaughnessyi Boulenger, 1881

= Enyalioides oshaughnessyi =

Species of lizard

Enyalioides oshaughnessyi, also known commonly as O'Shaughnessy's dwarf iguana, the red-eyed woodlizard, and la lagartija de palo ojirroja in South American Spanish, is a species of lizard in the family Hoplocercidae. The species is native to northwestern South America.

== Etymology ==
The specific name oshaughnessyi honors Arthur O'Shaughnessy, a British herpetologist and poet.

== Description ==
Enyalioides oshaughnessyi has smooth or slightly keeled dorsal scales which are homogeneous in size. The iris of the eye may be bright red in both sexes. The male has a dark patch on the inner aspect of the gular fold. E. oshaughnessyi may attain a snout-to-vent length (SVL) of 13.5 cm (5.3 in). The tail is long, more than twice SVL, and laterally compressed.

== Geographic distribution ==
Enyalioides oshaughnessyi occurs in southern Colombia and northern Ecuador.

== Habitat ==
The preferred natural habitat of Enyalioides oshaughnessyi is forest, at elevations of 50–1,600 m (160–5,250 ft).

== Behavior ==
Enyalioides oshaughnessyi is diurnal and arboreal, sleeping at night on branches.

== Reproduction ==
Enyalioides oshaughnessyi is oviparous.
