= Enyalioides touzeti =

Conservation status
- Vulnerable (IUCN 3.1)

Scientific classification
- Kingdom: Animalia
- Phylum: Chordata
- Class: Reptilia
- Order: Squamata
- Suborder: Iguania
- Family: Hoplocercidae
- Genus: Enyalioides
- Species: E. touzeti

Binomial name
- Enyalioides touzeti Torres-Carvajal, Almendáriz, Valencia, Yúnez-Muñoz, & Reyes, 2008

Species of lizard

Enyalioides touzeti, also known as Touzet's woodlizard, is a species of lizard in the family Hoplocercidae. It occurs on the western Andean slopes of southwestern Ecuador and northern Peru.
