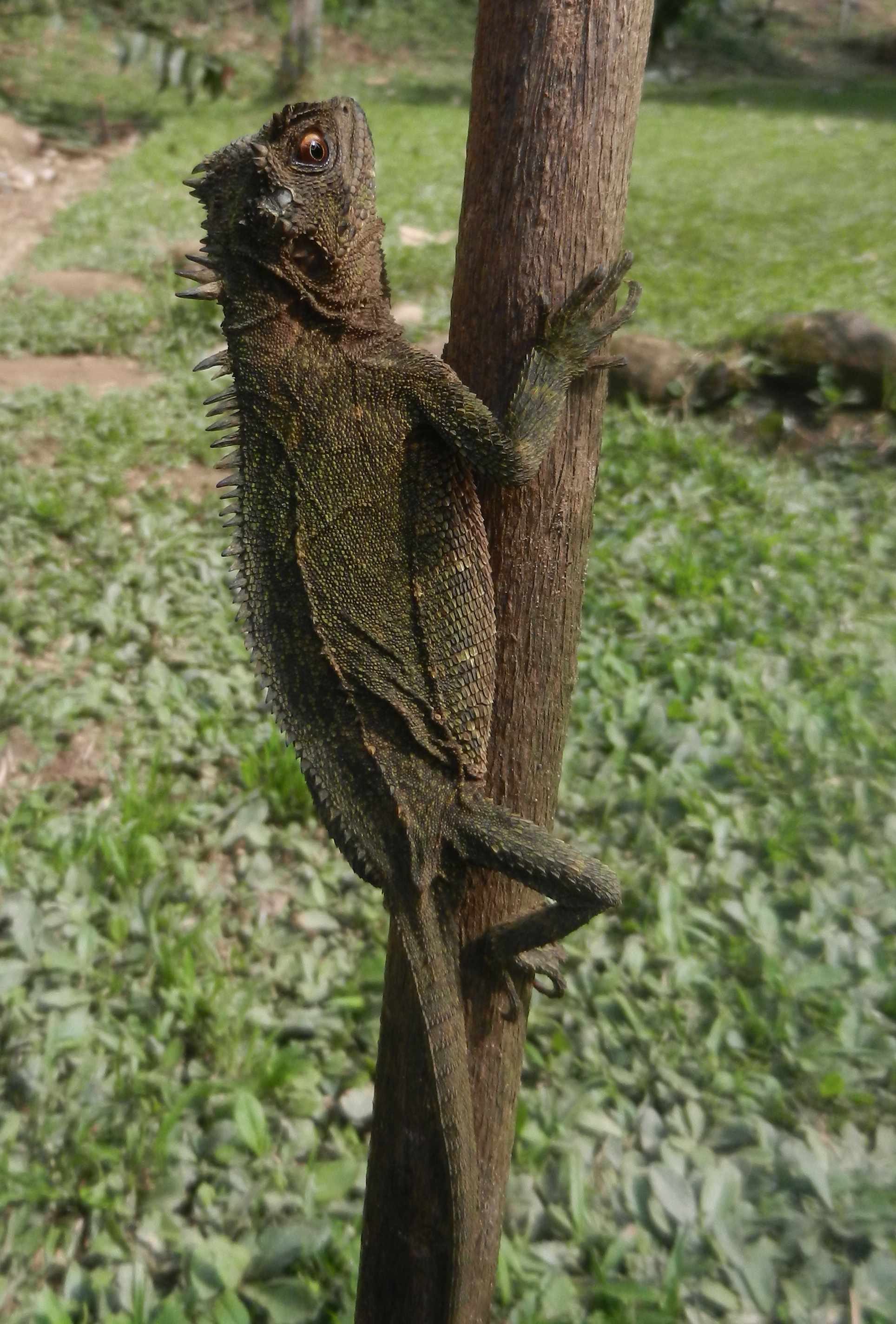

Conservation status
- Least Concern (IUCN 3.1)

Scientific classification
- Kingdom: Animalia
- Phylum: Chordata
- Class: Reptilia
- Order: Squamata
- Suborder: Iguania
- Family: Hoplocercidae
- Genus: Enyalioides
- Species: E. palpebralis

Binomial name
- Enyalioides palpebralis (Boulenger, 1883)

= Horned woodlizard =

Species of lizard

The horned woodlizard or Boulenger's dwarf iguana (Enyalioides palpebralis) is a species of reptile in the genus Enyalioides, native to northern Bolivia, western Brazil and eastern Peru.

== Gallery ==
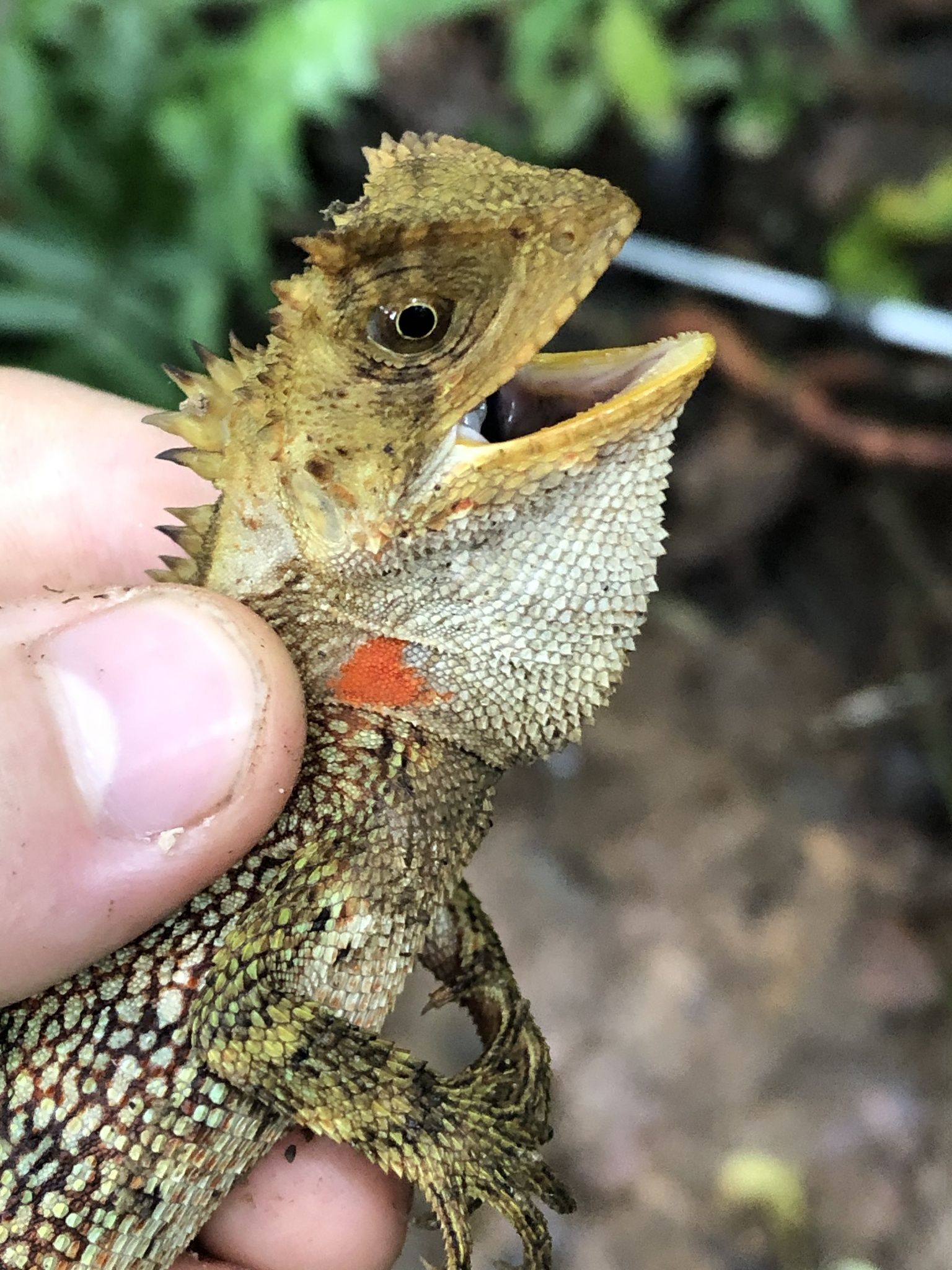
In Peru

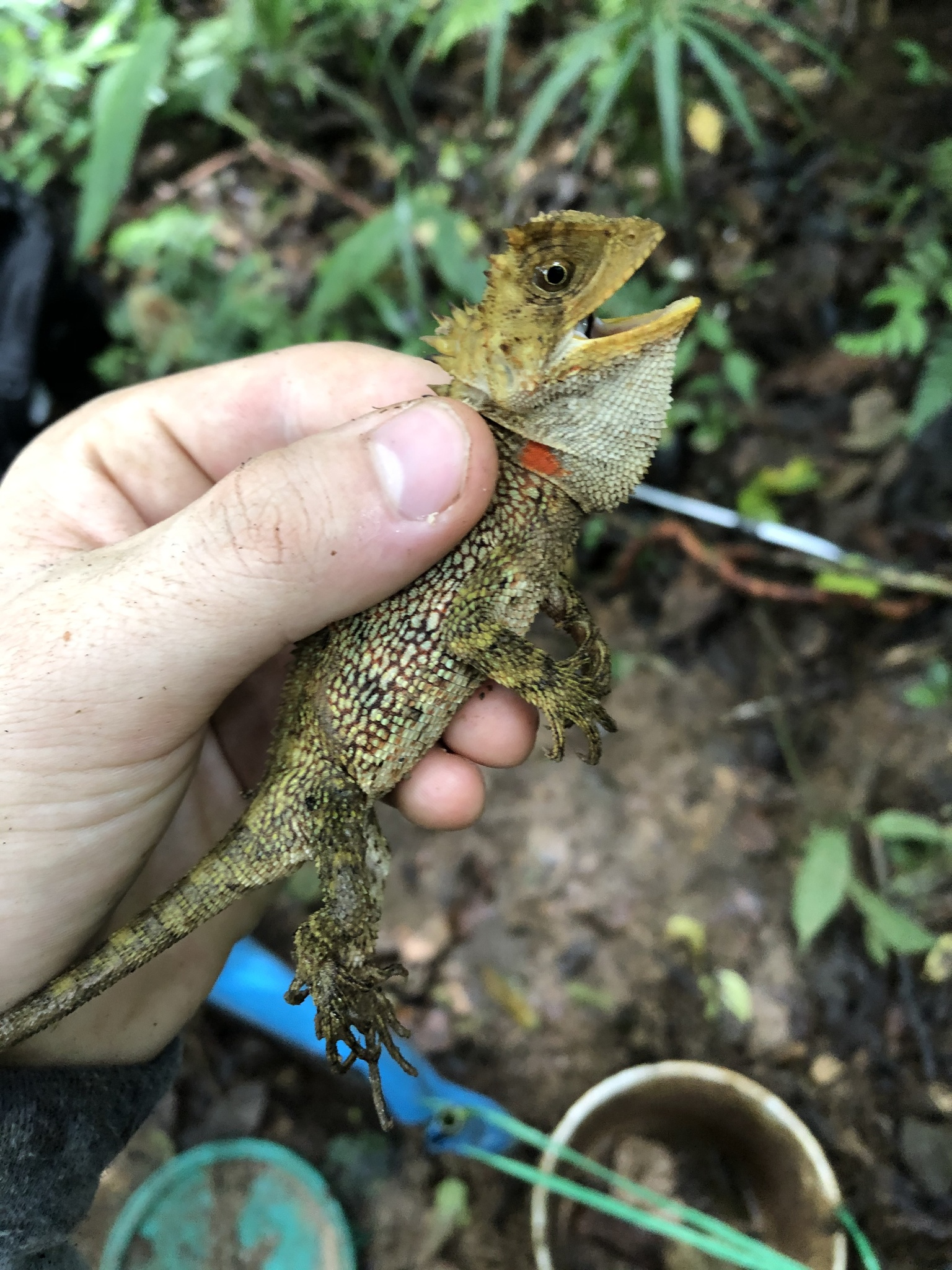
