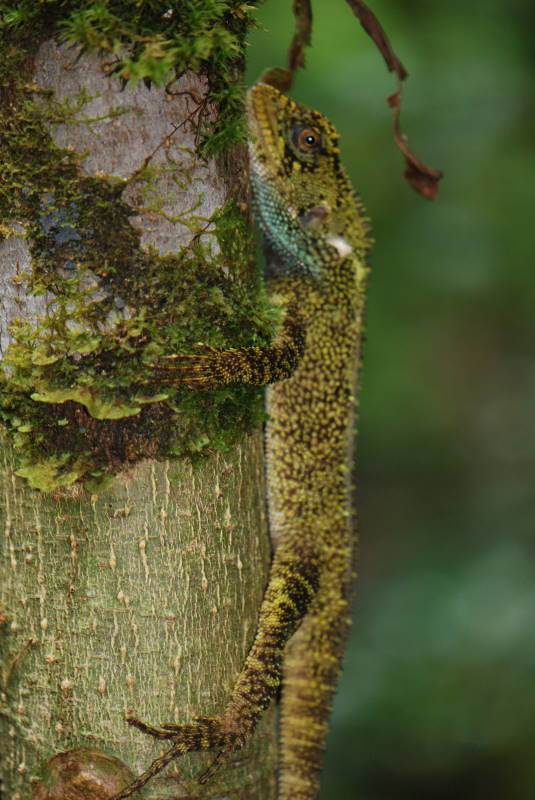

Conservation status
- Least Concern (IUCN 3.1)

Scientific classification
- Kingdom: Animalia
- Phylum: Chordata
- Class: Reptilia
- Order: Squamata
- Suborder: Iguania
- Family: Hoplocercidae
- Genus: Enyalioides
- Species: E. cofanorum

Binomial name
- Enyalioides cofanorum Duellman, 1973

= Enyalioides cofanorum =

Species of lizard

Enyalioides cofanorum, also known commonly as the Cofan woodlizard, Duellman's dwarf iguana, and lagartija de palo cofanes in Spanish, is a species of lizard in the family Hoplocercidae. The species is native to northwestern South America.

== Etymology ==
The specific name, cofanorum, is in honor of the Cofán people of Ecuador.

== Geographic range ==
E. cofanorum is found in Colombia and Ecuador.

== Habitat ==
The preferred natural habitat of E. cofanorum is forest, at altitudes of 100–1,230 m (330–4,040 ft).

== Description ==
As an adult E. cofanorum does not exceed 11 cm (4.3 in) in snout-to-vent length (SVL).

== Diet ==
E. cofanorum preys upon earthworms, insects, and spiders.

== Reproduction ==
E. cofanorum is oviparous. Clutch size is 2–5 eggs.
