= Molly R. Morris =

American ecologist

- Education: Earlham College; Indiana University Bloomington
- Spouse: Kevin de Queiroz
- Scientific career
- Fields: Behavioral ecology
- Institutions: Ohio University
- Thesis: Mating behaviour in relation to sexual selection in the treefrogs Hyla chrysoscelis and Hyla ebraccata. (1987)
- Website: ohio.edu/people/morrism

Molly R. Morris is an American behavioral ecologist who has worked with treefrogs and swordtail fishes in the areas of alternative reproductive tactics and sexual selection.

Morris received a Bachelor of Arts from Earlham College in 1978 and a PhD from Indiana University Bloomington in 1987. As a National Science Foundation postdoctoral fellow at the University of Texas at Austin, her work with Mike Ryan demonstrated equal fitnesses between alternative reproductive tactics in a species of swordtail fish. She joined the faculty at Ohio University in 1997, where she is now a professor in the Department of Biological Sciences. She is also the Associate Editor for the journal Behavior. Her publication credits include multiple papers on Animal behavior and Ecology. Her current research relates to diabetes, as well as behavioral ecology, using the swordtail fish Xiphophorus as a model organism.

== Personal life ==
Morris is married to Kevin de Queiroz, an evolutionary biologist at the Smithsonian Institution's National Museum of Natural History.

== Selected works ==
- Gardner, Roy; Morris, Molly R. (1989). "The evolution of bluffing in animal contests: an ESS approach". Journal of Theoretical Biology. 137 (2): 235–243. Bibcode:1989JThBi.137..235G. doi:10.1016/S0022-5193(89)80209-7. hdl:10535/5208.
- Morris, Molly R. (1998). "Female preference for trait symmetry in addition to trait size in swordtail fish". Proceedings of the Royal Society of London B. 265 (1399): 907–911. doi:10.1098/rspb.1998.0377. PMC 1689052.
- Just, Winfried; Morris, Molly R. (2003). "The Napoleon Complex: Why smaller males pick fights". Evolutionary Biology. 17 (5–6): 509–522. doi:10.1023/b:evec.0000005629.54152.83. S2CID 11965682.
- Morris, Molly R.; Nicoletto, Paul F.; Hesselman, Elizabeth (2003). "A polymorphism in female preference for a polymorphic male trait in the swordtail fish Xiphophorus cortezi". Animal Behaviour. 65 (1): 45–52. doi:10.1006/anbe.2002.2042. S2CID 13334832.
- Morris, Molly R.; Rios-Cardenas, Oscar; Scarlett Tudor, M. (2006). "Larger swordtail females prefer asymmetrical males". Biology Letters. 2 (1): 8–11. doi:10.1098/rsbl.2005.0387. PMC 1617184. PMID 17148312.
- Morris, Molly R.; Rios-Cardenas, Oscar; Lyons, Susan M; Scarlett Tudor, M.; Bono, Lisa M. (2012). "Fluctuating asymmetry indicates the optimization of growth rate over developmental stability". Functional Ecology. 26 (3): 723–731. doi:10.1111/j.1365-2435.2012.01983.x.
- Morris, Molly. R.; Friebertshauser, R. J.; Rios-Cardenas, Oscar; Liotta, M. N.; Abbott, Jessica K. (2016). "The potential for disruptive selection on growth rates across genetically influenced alternative reproductive tactics". Evolutionary Ecology. 30 (3): 519–533. doi:10.1007/s10682-016-9823-x. S2CID 16340410.
