= Arthur O'Shaughnessy =

British poet (1844–1881)

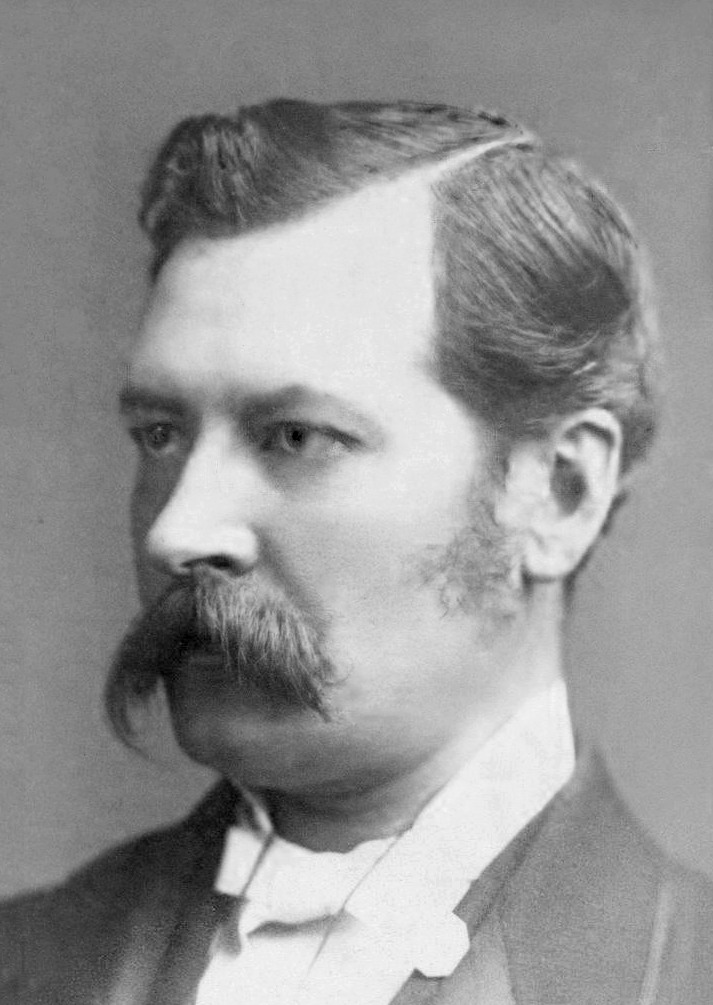
- O'Shaughnessy c. 1875
- Born: 14 March 1844; London, England
- Died: 30 January 1881 (aged 36); London, England
- Spouse: Eleanor Marston (m. 1873; died 1879)
- Children: 2

Arthur William Edgar O'Shaughnessy (14 March 1844 – 30 January 1881) was a British poet and herpetologist. Of Irish descent, he was born in London. He is most remembered for his poem "Ode", from his 1874 collection Music and Moonlight, which begins with the words "We are the music makers, / And we are the dreamers of dreams", and which has been set to music by several composers including Edward Elgar (as The Music Makers), Zoltán Kodály, Alfred Reed and, more recently, 808 State (ex:el: nephatiti) and Aphex Twin (Selected Ambient Works 85-92).

== Early life and herpetology ==
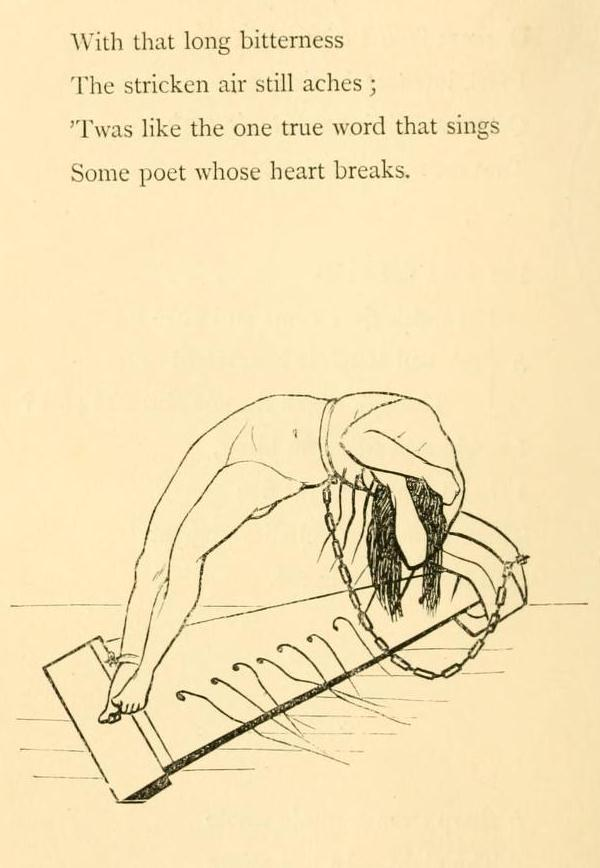
J. T. Nettleship's illustration to O'Shaughnessy's poem "A Neglected Harp" in Epic of Women (1870)

In June 1861, at age 17, Arthur O'Shaughnessy received the post of transcriber in the library of the British Museum, reportedly through the influence of Sir Edward Bulwer Lytton. According to Sir Edmund Gosse, O'Shaughnessy was one of Bulwer Lytton's many children born out of wedlock. Two years later, he became a herpetologist in the museum's zoological department. From 1874 to his premature death, he described six new species of reptiles, and after his death, he was honoured in the specific name, oshaughnessyi, of four new species of lizards described by Albert Günther and George Albert Boulenger.

== Poetry ==
However, O'Shaughnessy's true passion was for literature. He published his first collection of poetry, Epic of Women, in 1870, followed two years later by Lays of France in 1872, and then Music and Moonlight in 1874. He is now best remembered for the first poem in his collection Music and Moonlight, entitled "Ode", which begins with the words: "We are the music makers, / And we are the dreamers of dreams".

O'Shaughnessy's most quoted poem is his ode to the place of art, beginning

We are the music-makers.
And we are the dreamers of dreams.
Wandering by lone sea-breakers.
And sitting by desolate streams;
World-losers and world-forsakers.
On whom the pale moon gleams
Yet we are the movers and shakers
Of the world for ever, it seems

When he was 30, he married and did not produce any more volumes of poetry for the last seven years of his life. His last volume, Songs of a Worker, was published posthumously in 1881. O'Shaughnessy was both formally and aesthetically cutting-edge. For example, he is one of the few Pre-Raphaelite poets to have needed a steady income, and his corpus often explores the relationship between art and work. Unlike other Pre-Raphaelites, O'Shaughnessy saw poetry as the result of toil rather than the consequence of a moment's frenetic inspiration.

In his influential 1957 essay, T. S. Eliot gives O'Shaughnessy as an example of "poets who have written just one, or only a few good poems," and says that, despite his uneven output, "We Are the Music Makers" belongs in any 19th century verse anthology.

== Personal life ==
The artists Dante Gabriel Rossetti and Ford Madox Brown were among O'Shaughnessy's circle of friends, and in 1873, he married Eleanor Marston, the daughter of author John Westland Marston and the sister of the poet Philip Bourke Marston. Together, he and his wife wrote a book of children's stories, Toy-land (1875). They had two children together, both of whom died in infancy.

Eleanor died in 1879, and O'Shaughnessy himself died in London two years later at the age of 36 from the effects of a "chill" after walking home from the theatre on a rainy night. He is buried in Kensal Green Cemetery.

== Legacy ==
The anthologist Francis Turner Palgrave, in his work, The Golden Treasury declared that of the modern poets, despite his limited output, O'Shaughnessy had a gift that in some ways was second only to Tennyson and "a haunting music all his own".

O'Shaughnessy's translations of Parnassian poetry, and the influence of French decadence on his own work, were crucial in setting the stage for English-language decadence in the 1890s. Jordan Kistler writes that he was "instrumental in bridging the gap between the Pre-Raphaelitism practised by poets such as D. G. Rossetti and William Morris in the 1870s and the aestheticism of the 1890s".

O'Shaughnessy is commemorated in the scientific names of four species of lizards: Calumma oshaughnessyi, Cercosaura oshaughnessyi, Enyalioides oshaughnessyi, and Pachydactylus oshaughnessyi.

== Works ==
- An Epic of Women (1870)
- Lays of France (1872)
- Music and Moonlight: Poems and Songs (1874)
- Toy-land (with Eleanor W. O'Shaughnessy) (1875)
- Songs of a Worker (1881) (published posthumously)

== Sources ==
- Arthur O'Shaughnessy: Music Maker by Molly Whittington-Egan (2013) Bluecoat Press
- Arthur O'Shaughnessy, a Pre-Raphaelite Poet in the British Museum by Jordan Kistler (2016) Routledge
