= Kevin de Queiroz =

Kevin de Queiroz is a vertebrate, evolutionary, and systematic biologist. He has worked in the phylogenetics and evolutionary biology of squamate reptiles, the development of a unified species concept and of a phylogenetic approach to biological nomenclature, and the philosophy of systematic biology.

== Early life and career ==
De Queiroz was born and raised in Los Angeles, California. He received a B.S. in Biology from the University of California, Los Angeles (1978), a M.S. in Zoology from San Diego State University (1985), and a Ph.D. in Zoology from the University of California, Berkeley (1989). He was a Tilton Postdoctoral Fellow at the California Academy of Sciences and is currently a Research Zoologist and a curator of the collection of Amphibians and Reptiles at the National Museum of Natural History, Smithsonian Institution. He is a former president of the Society of Systematic Biologists and was the first president of the International Society for Phylogenetic Nomenclature.

== Research ==
=== Empirical research ===
De Queiroz’s research has focused primarily on the phylogeny and evolutionary biology of squamate reptiles, including his Master’s research on the phylogeny of iguanine lizards and his Ph.D. research on the phylogeny of phrynosomatine sand lizards. He worked with his mentors Richard Estes and Richard Etheridge on the phylogeny of Squamata and Iguanidae, respectively, and with Jacques Gauthier on the phylogeny of Lepidosauromorpha. He conducted research, including several publications with Jonathan Losos, on the phylogeny and adaptive radiation of Anolis lizards.

=== Theoretical research ===
De Queiroz also has interests in theoretical and conceptual topics in systematic and evolutionary biology. He published an article early in his career on the relationship between the sequence of ontogenetic transformations and phylogenetic inference. Beginning in 1998, he published a series of articles proposing how to achieve a unified species concept and outlining several of its consequences. In collaboration with Jacques Gauthier and Philip Cantino, de Queiroz has published another series of articles proposing and defending an approach to biological nomenclature based on definitions that specify the meanings of taxon names in terms of clades and common ancestry as an alternative to traditional approaches that are based on taxonomic ranks. He is coauthor of a draft Phylogenetic Code of Biological Nomenclature (aka the PhyloCode) with Cantino.

De Queiroz has published several articles on the history and philosophy of biology, related primarily, but not exclusively, to his own theoretical and conceptual contributions. He published a paper early in his career proposing that the Darwinian Revolution in systematic biology was not a sudden event but rather an extended process that is not yet completed. He has examined Charles Darwin’s writings on species and argued that his own ideas about how to achieve a unified species concept represent the ongoing development of the evolutionary view of species articulated by Darwin. He has examined the class versus individual interpretations of species and clades in light of his work on phylogenetic definitions of taxon names, proposing that contrary to how those interpretations are commonly presented, they are not mutually exclusive, which suggests that the same is true of ostensive and intensional definitions. He has argued that the philosopher Karl Popper’s concept of degree of corroboration is analogous to the likelihood ratio of nested hypotheses and that in phylogenetics the probability of the evidence given the background knowledge in the absence of the hypothesis of interest (a critical component of Popper’s "Degree of Corroboration") is represented by the likelihood of a star tree.

== Personal life ==
De Queiroz is married to Molly R. Morris, an evolutionary animal behaviorist and Professor of Biology at Ohio University.
