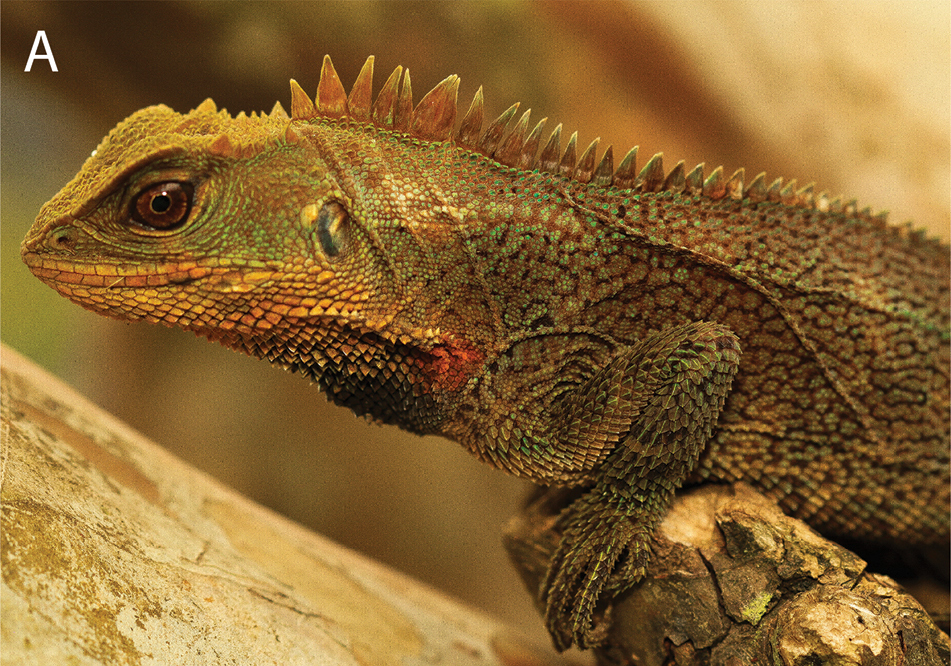
- Adult male

Scientific classification
- Kingdom: Animalia
- Phylum: Chordata
- Class: Reptilia
- Order: Squamata
- Suborder: Iguania
- Family: Hoplocercidae
- Genus: Enyalioides
- Species: E. feiruzae

Binomial name
- Enyalioides feiruzae Venegas, Chávez, García-Ayachi, Duran, & Torres-Carvajal, 2021

= Enyalioides feiruzae =

Species of lizard

Enyalioides feiruzae, also known as the Feiruz wood lizard, is a species of wood lizard in the genus Enyalioides, from the Peruvian Yungas.

== Taxonomy ==
Enyalioides feiruzae was formally described in 2021 by a group of Peruvian herpetologists based on an adult male specimen collected from near Santa Rita Sur village along the Huallaga River in the Department of Huánuco, Peru. The species was named after Feiruz, a female green iguana owned by Catherine Thomson, a Michigan resident who financially supported the authors' research through the BIOPAT initiative. The species has the English common name Feiruz wood lizard and Spanish common name Lagartija de palo de Feiruz.

== Description ==
The holotype male had a turquoise dorsal surface of body, limbs and tail, while the upper side of the head was greenish with scattered dark brown flecks. The side of the head was largely orange, with the temporal area and upperside of the neck having orange reticulation. The sides of the neck had reddish-brown reticulation and a faint post-tympanic white stripe. The vertebral crest was orange at the neck and turquoise with a reddish-brown base elsewhere. The entire dorsum was covered by reddish-brown reticulations, most well-defined on the flanks, with a row of faint pale blotches along the sides. The limbs and tail were greenish, with dark brown to nearly black markings on the former. The throat was orange with a black patch towards the breast and the chin was white. The chest, venter, and underside of the limbs and tail were white. The iris was reddish brown, darker in the center than peripherally, with a golden ring bordering the pupil. The species is highly polymorphic; adult males can have brownish turquoise, gray, or greenish-brown dorsums, marked with pale or black transverse bands. Males other than the holotype also have the orange on the head restricted to their labials and throat.

Adult females have greenish-brown or floury-brown dorsums with faint dark-brown transverse bars on the dorsum, limbs, and tail, and similarly-colored blotches on the flanks. Some females have broad dark subocular stripes and narrow supratemporal stripes, while others have a faint postympanic stripe. Sexual dimorphism is not easily evident in the species because of the level of polymorphism, but females do not have any orange on the head or a black patch on the throat. Additionally, females lack the turquoise hue present on the dorsum of some males. Juveniles have brown and green dorsums, with a paravertebral row of either dark brown blotches with pale spaces in between or pale blotches. They also have dark marks or flecks on head, dark supratemporal stripe and postocular blotch, and postympanic pale stripe. The flanks can have small pale blotches and black flecks, transverse rows of dark brown (nearly black) blotches and dark brown flecks, or faint transverse cream bands and dark brown marks.

== Distribution and habitat ==
Enyalioides feiruzae is known only from the Huallaga River basin in the Huánuco Department of Peru, where it is found on the Amazonian slope of the Andes at elevations between 830 and 1,614 m. The localities where the species were found are entirely within the Peruvian Yungas, in the provinces of Pachitea, Huánuco, and Leoncio Prado. In Pachitea and Huánuco, the species was found along the Huallaga River basin, in scattered patches of secondary forest surrounded by pasturelands and plantations in highly human-affected steep areas. In Leoncio Prado, it was found in the Tingo María National Park, where the dominant habitat is primary forest with streams and small, torrential waterfalls.

In secondary forest, most individuals were collected at night sleeping on vertical and horizontal stems of bushes 20–150 cm above the ground. One juvenile was found sleeping in the middle of a big leaf 30 cm above the ground. Another juvenile was found sleeping in a vertical stem, and when disturbed by the light of the headlamp, dropped and hid in a burrow under a large rock. One male was found at night sleeping on branches in a small patch of secondary forest surrounded by crops. Adults from Tingo María National Park were caught sleeping vertically on stems near streams and waterfalls, with one male-female pair found sleeping only 1.5 meters from each other.

== Gallery ==
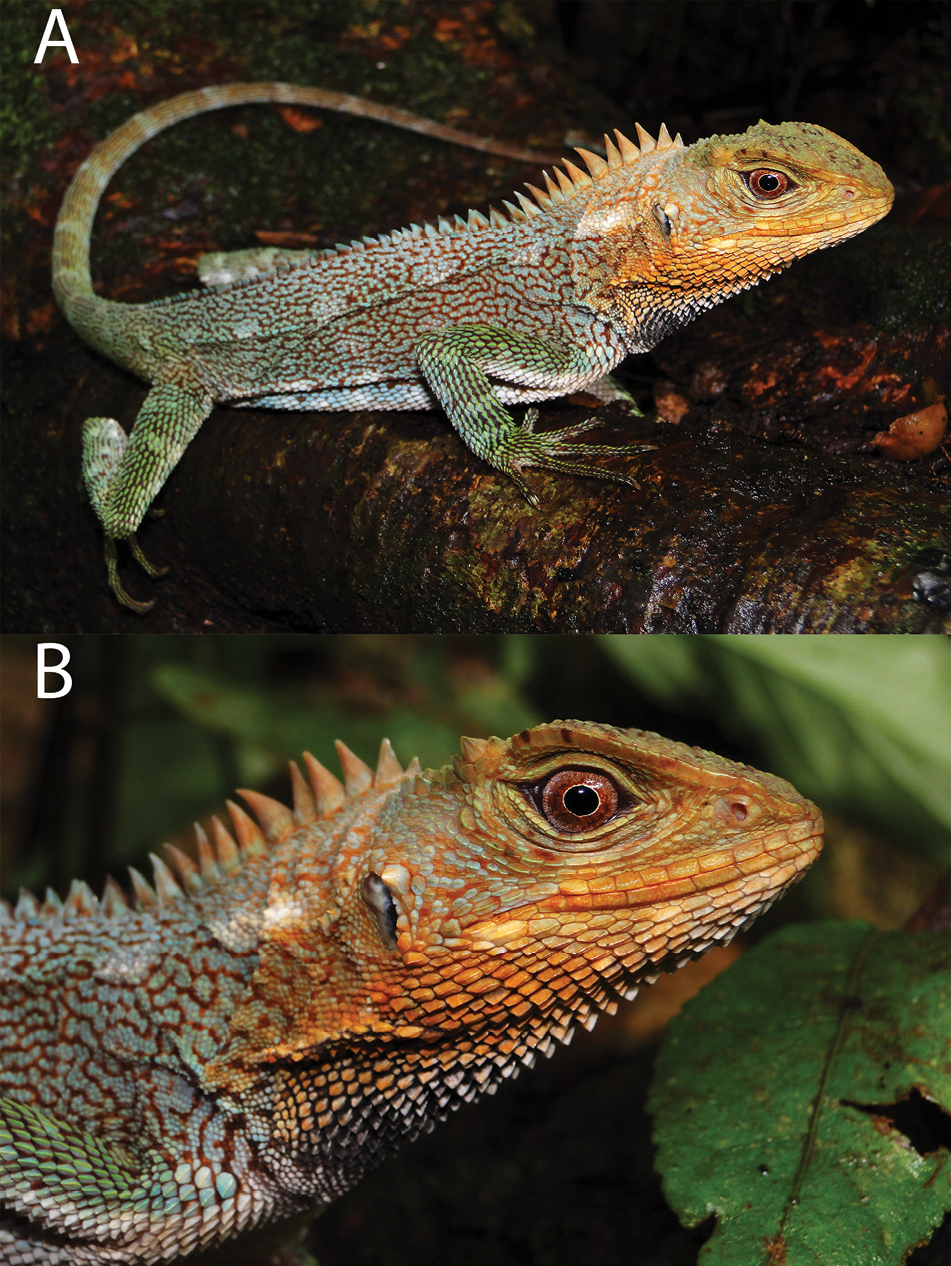
Holotype specimen (adult male)

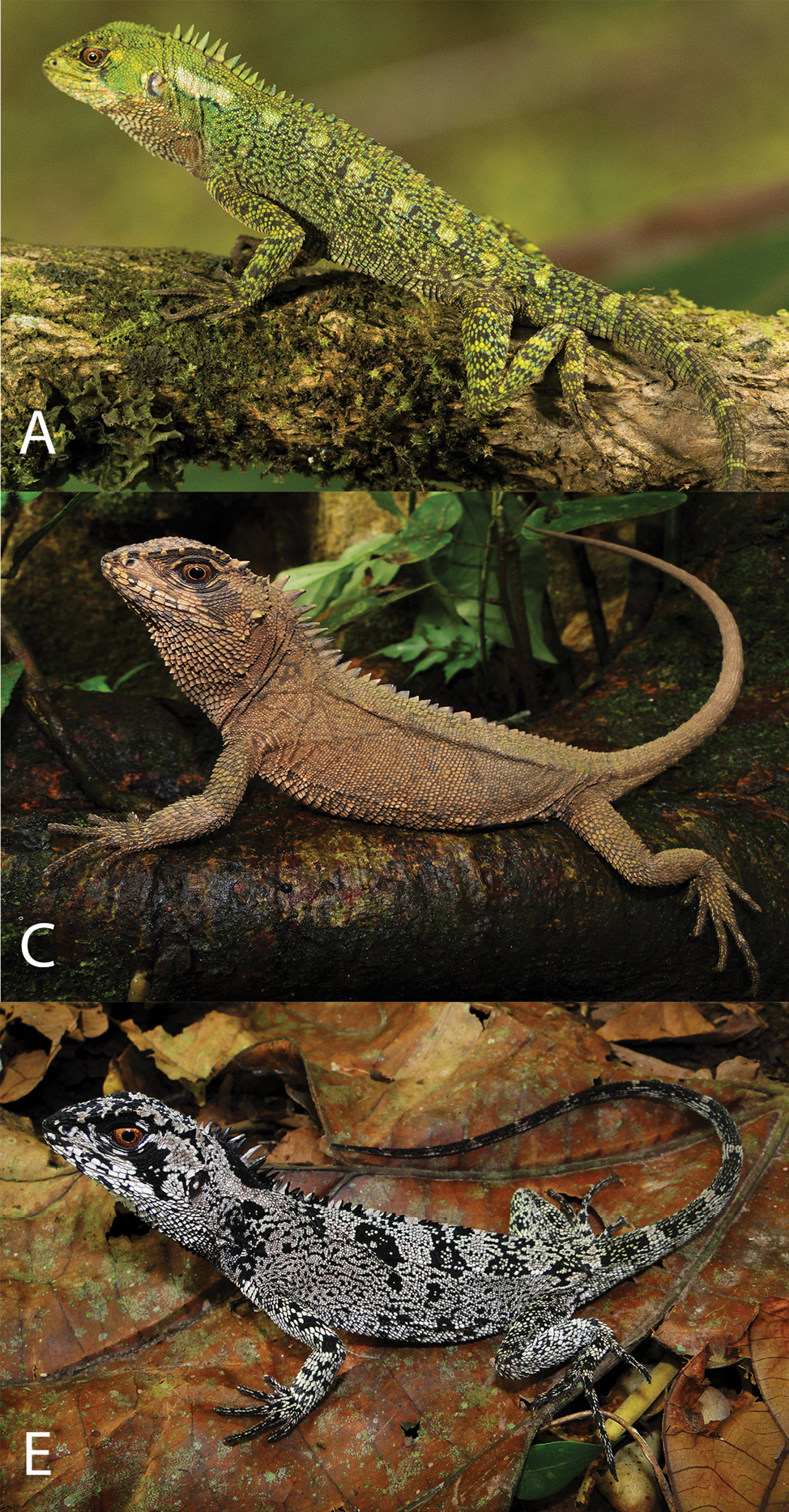
Adult male (A & E), adult female (C)

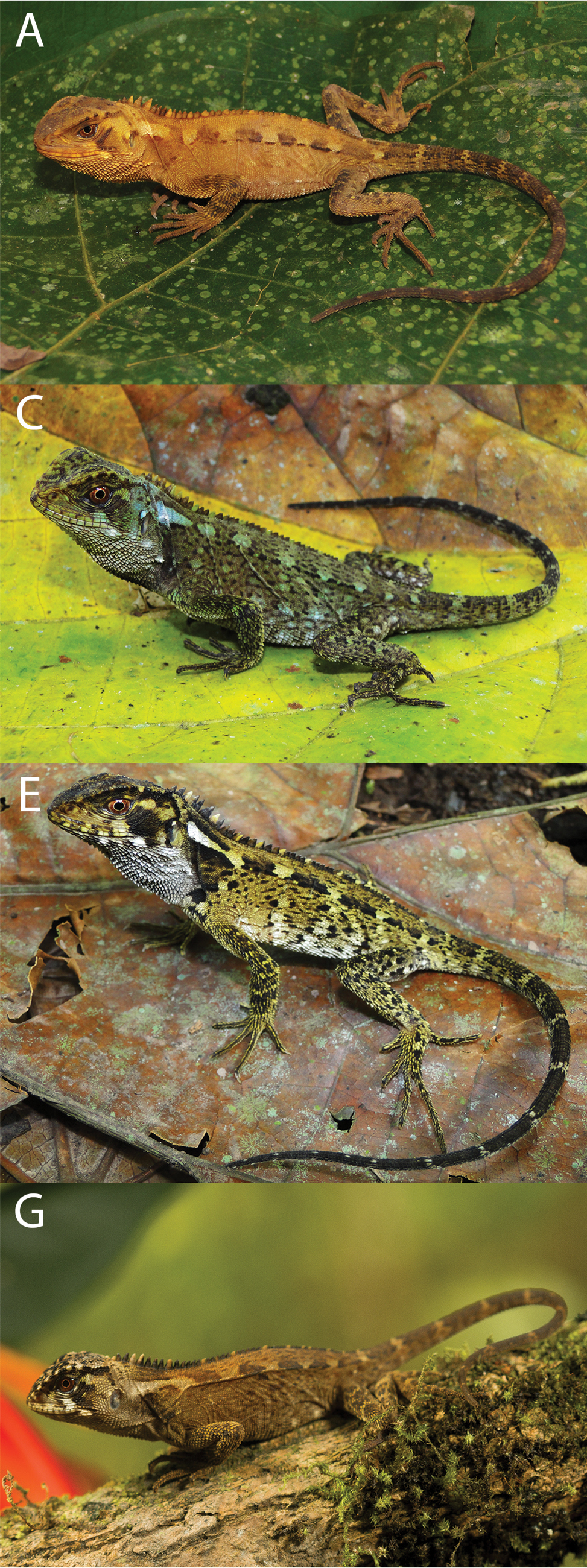
Juveniles
