= Henricus tingomariae =

Scientific classification
- Domain: Eukaryota
- Kingdom: Animalia
- Phylum: Arthropoda
- Class: Insecta
- Order: Lepidoptera
- Family: Tortricidae
- Genus: Henricus
- Species: H. tingomariae

Binomial name
- Henricus tingomariae Razowski & Wojtusiak, 2010

Species of moth

Henricus tingomariae is a species of moth of the family Tortricidae. It is found in Peru.

The wingspan is about 34 mm for males and 37 mm for females.

== Etymology ==
The species name refers to Tingo María, the type locality.
