= Chaetostoma taczanowskii =

Conservation status
- Least Concern (IUCN 3.1)

Scientific classification
- Kingdom: Animalia
- Phylum: Chordata
- Class: Actinopterygii
- Order: Siluriformes
- Family: Loricariidae
- Genus: Chaetostoma
- Species: C. taczanowskii

Binomial name
- Chaetostoma taczanowskii Steindachner, 1882

Synonyms
- Chaetostomus taczanowskii

Species of catfish

Chaetostoma taczanowskii is a species of catfish in the family Loricariidae. It is native to South America, where it occurs in the basins of the Huallaga River and the Urubamba River in Peru. The species reaches 17 cm (6.7 inches) in total length.

== Taxonomy ==
Chaetostoma taczanowskii was first described by Franz Steindachner in 1882. It is named in honor of Władysław Taczanowski, a Polish zoologist. It is classified in the order Siluriformes (the catfishes) in the class Actinopterygii. Its family, Loricariidae, is sometimes called the armoured catfishes. The species has been referred to by the synonym Chaetostomus taczanowskii. In Spanish, it is known by the common name "carachama".

== Distribution ==
The range of C. taczanowskii is limited to the Huallaga River and the Urubamba River basins of Peru, including the Huambo, Tingo, Mayo, Bella, Oro, and Santa rivers. Its range includes Tingo María National Park.

== Ecology ==
This species prefers rocky substrates and clear water, though it does not discriminate between quiet pools and whitewater rivers. It is primarily herbivorous, consuming algae and periphyton, though it opportunistically consumes macroinvertebrates that are present on periphyton. They are benthic (living near the river floor) and nocturnal. C. taczanowskii grows to a maximum of 17 cm (6.7 inches) in total length.

It is assessed as a least concern species on the IUCN Red List, as it faces few threats to its population. The fish is taken by subsistence fishermen in local communities. Hydroelectric dam construction in the area represents a potential future threat to the species.
