= Hermilio Valdizán District =

Coordinates: 9.9496°S 76.2512°W

Hermilio Valdizán
- District
- Interactive map of Hermilio Valdizán
- Country: Peru
- Region: Huánuco
- Province: Leoncio Prado
- Founded: May 27, 1952
- Capital: Hermilio Valdizán

Government
  - Mayor: Samuel Ernesto Zavala Flores

Area
  - Total: 117.24 km^{2} (45.27 sq mi)
- Elevation: 1,250 m (4,100 ft)

Population (2005 census)
  - Total: 3,742
  - Density: 31.92/km^{2} (82.67/sq mi)
- Time zone: UTC-5 (PET)
- UBIGEO: 100603

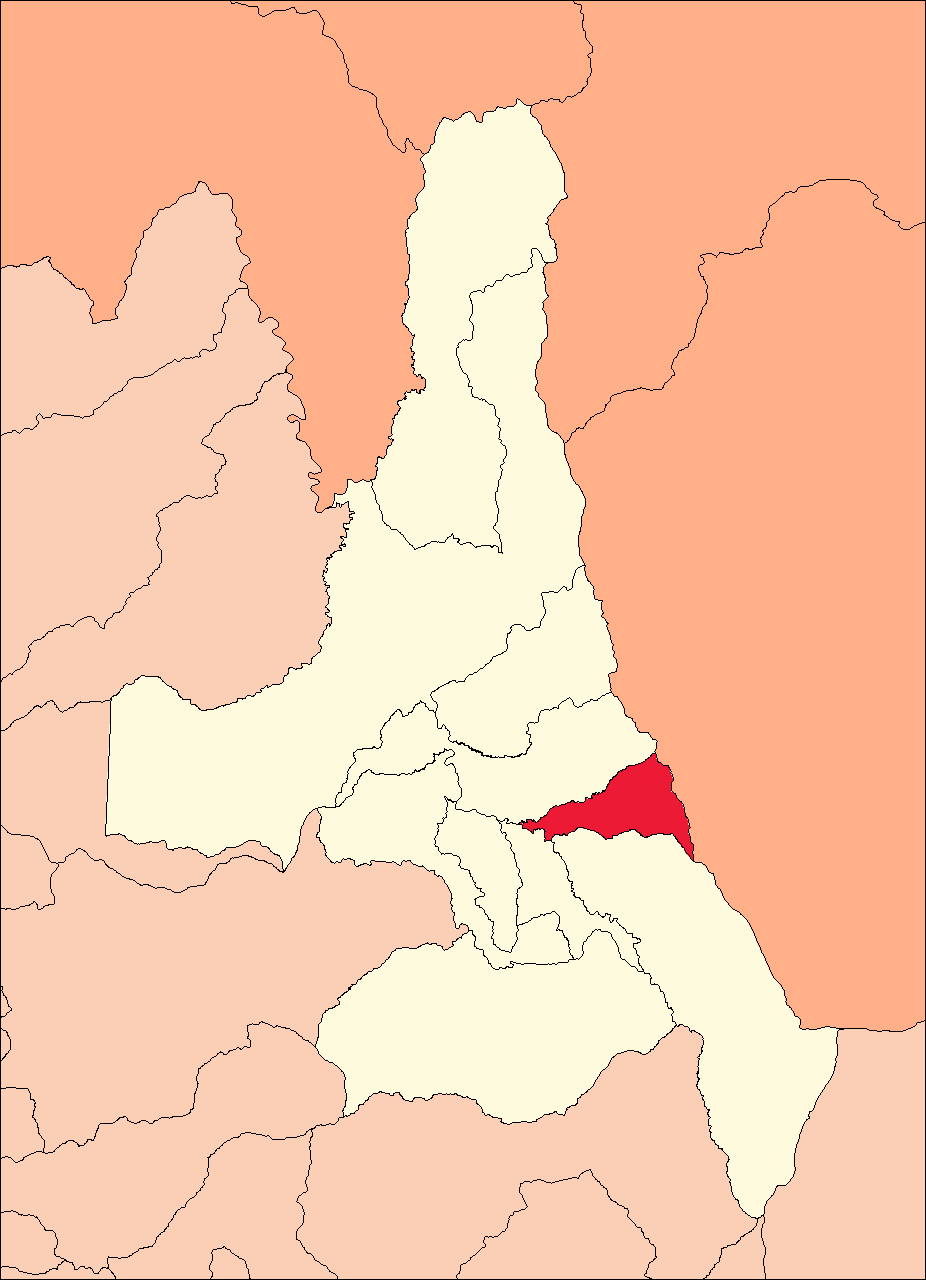
Area of the district

Hermilio Valdizán District is one of six districts of the province Leoncio Prado in Peru.
