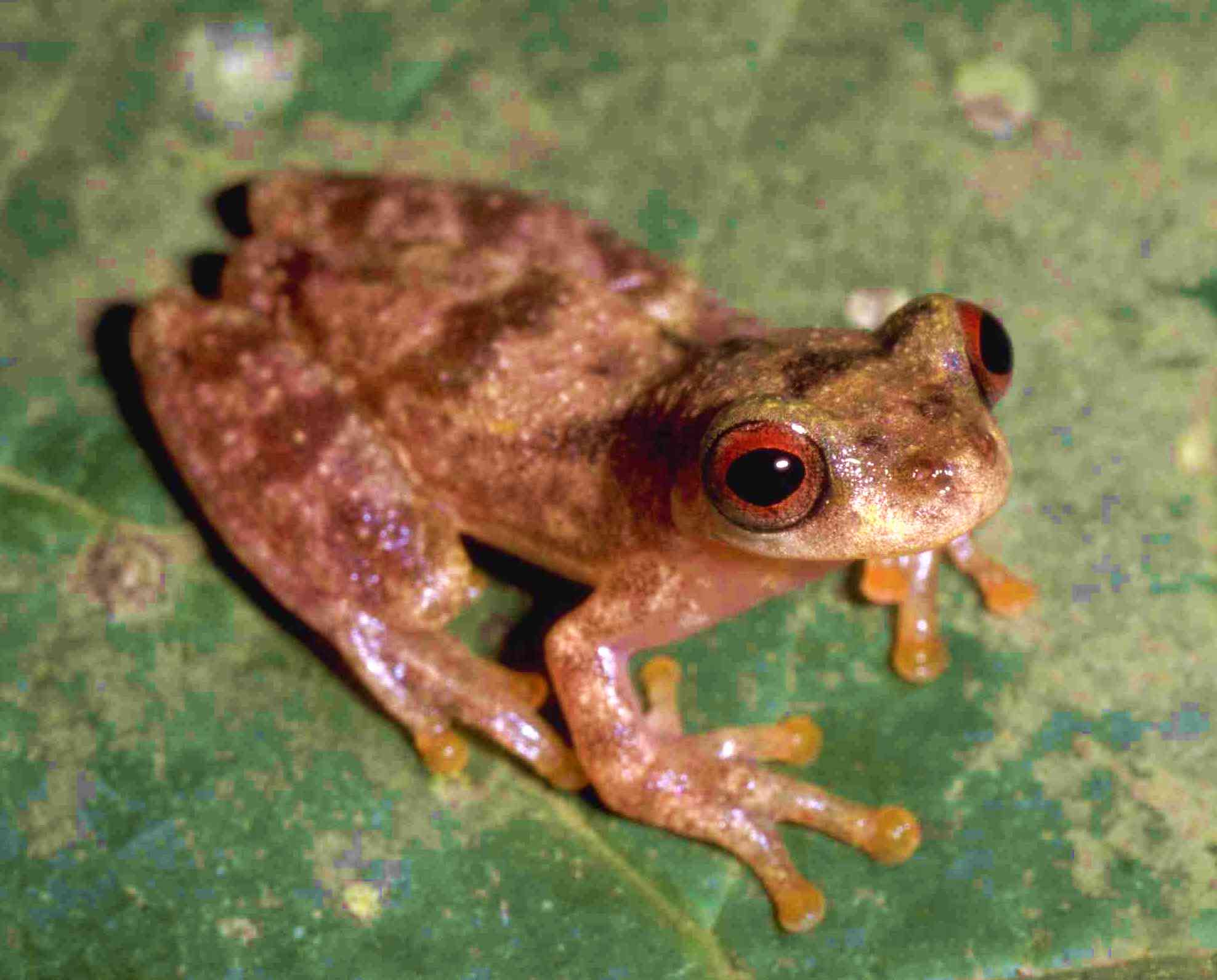

Conservation status
- Data Deficient (IUCN 3.1)

Scientific classification
- Kingdom: Animalia
- Phylum: Chordata
- Class: Amphibia
- Order: Anura
- Family: Hylidae
- Genus: Dendropsophus
- Species: D. joannae

Binomial name
- Dendropsophus joannae (J. Köhler & Lötters, 2001)

Synonyms
- Hyla joannae J. Köhler & Lötters, 2001

= Dendropsophus joannae =

Species of amphibian

Dendropsophus joannae is a species of frog in the family Hylidae. The species is known from Pando Department, northern Bolivia (where its type locality is), western Brazil (Acre and Amazonas states), and Madre de Dios Region of southeastern Peru. It is similar to Dendropsophus leali but is smaller, has a shorter snout, more protuberant eyes, and more tuberculate dorsal skin.

== Etymology ==
The specific name, joannae, is in honor of Mrs. Jo Ann Oxley Foster of Prescott, Arizona, a BIOPAT patron supporting taxonomic research and nature conservation.

== Description ==
Adult males of Dendrosophus joannae measure 15–19 mm (0.6–0.7 in) in snout-to-vent length (SVL), and adult females, based on two specimens only, 20–21 mm (0.8–0.8 in) in SVL. The body is slender. The snout is rounded. The tympanum is distinct with a prominent annulus; the supratympanic fold is evident. The fingers and the toes are short and bear large discs; the fingers are about two-fifths webbed while the toes are about four-fifths webbed. The dorsum is grayish or yellowish tan with brown markings. The finger and toe discs are dorsally bright yellow. The ventral surfaces of the limbs and the belly are fleshy transparent. The chest is cream, and the throat is yellowish. The inner iris is red, surrounded by narrow tan ring.

== Habitat ==
Dendropsophus joannae has been found in open habitats with tall grass surrounding small ponds and roadside ditches at elevations of 238–250 m (781–820 ft) above sea level.

== Reproduction ==
Breeding of Dendrosophus joannae presumably takes place in ponds and ditches. Males have a specific advertisement call that attracts the female frogs. This call consists of 2 short notes, with a 3-6 pulse in the first note and a 4-8 pulse in the second note.

== Conservation ==
Dendrosophus joannae appears to be an adaptable species and is considered not to likely to be facing major threats. It occurs in a number of protected areas in Brazil.
