= Luyando District =

Coordinates: 9.2469°S 75.9919°W

Luyando
- District
- Interactive map of Luyando
- Country: Peru
- Region: Huánuco
- Province: Leoncio Prado
- Founded: May 27, 1952
- Capital: Luyando

Government
  - Mayor: José Santos Quiroz Alva

Area
  - Total: 100.32 km^{2} (38.73 sq mi)
- Elevation: 620 m (2,030 ft)

Population (2005 census)
  - Total: 8,522
  - Density: 84.95/km^{2} (220.0/sq mi)
- Time zone: UTC-5 (PET)
- UBIGEO: 100605

Luyando District is one of six districts of the province Leoncio Prado in Peru.
