= Henricus chriograptus =

Scientific classification
- Kingdom: Animalia
- Phylum: Arthropoda
- Class: Insecta
- Order: Lepidoptera
- Family: Tortricidae
- Genus: Henricus
- Species: H. chriograptus

Binomial name
- Henricus chriograptus Razowski, 1999

Species of moth

Henricus chriograptus is a species of moth of the family Tortricidae. It is found in Costa Rica.
