= Henricus exploratus =

Scientific classification
- Kingdom: Animalia
- Phylum: Arthropoda
- Clade: Pancrustacea
- Class: Insecta
- Order: Lepidoptera
- Family: Tortricidae
- Genus: Henricus
- Species: H. exploratus

Binomial name
- Henricus exploratus Razowski & Becker, 1986

Species of moth

Henricus exploratus is a species of moth of the family Tortricidae. It is found in Costa Rica. The habitat consists of cloud forests.
