= Henricus icogramma =

Scientific classification
- Domain: Eukaryota
- Kingdom: Animalia
- Phylum: Arthropoda
- Class: Insecta
- Order: Lepidoptera
- Family: Tortricidae
- Genus: Henricus
- Species: H. icogramma

Binomial name
- Henricus icogramma (Clarke, 1968)

Synonyms
- Irazona icogramma Clarke, 1968

Species of moth

Henricus icogramma is a species of moth of the family Tortricidae. It is found in Guatemala.
