= Henricus cuspis =

Scientific classification
- Kingdom: Animalia
- Phylum: Arthropoda
- Clade: Pancrustacea
- Class: Insecta
- Order: Lepidoptera
- Family: Tortricidae
- Genus: Henricus
- Species: H. cuspis

Binomial name
- Henricus cuspis Razowski & Becker, 2007

Species of moth

Henricus cuspis is a species of moth of the family Tortricidae. It is found in Carchi Province, Ecuador.

The wingspan is about 12.5 mm.
