= Henricus bleptus =

Scientific classification
- Kingdom: Animalia
- Phylum: Arthropoda
- Clade: Pancrustacea
- Class: Insecta
- Order: Lepidoptera
- Family: Tortricidae
- Genus: Henricus
- Species: H. bleptus

Binomial name
- Henricus bleptus Razowski & Becker, 2007

Species of moth

Henricus bleptus is a species of moth of the family Tortricidae. It is found in Ecuador (Pichincha Province, Carchi Province).

The wingspan is about 18.5 mm.

== Etymology ==
The species name refers to the facies of the species and is derived from Greek bleptos (meaning worth seeing).
