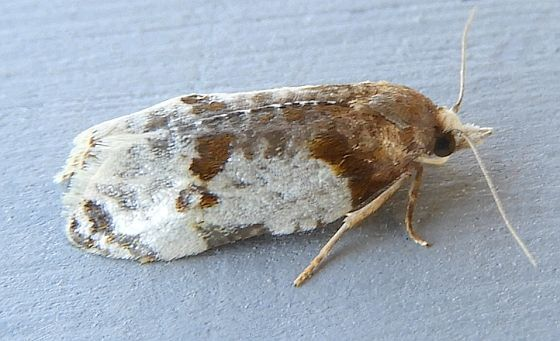
- Henricus fuscodorsana

Scientific classification
- Domain: Eukaryota
- Kingdom: Animalia
- Phylum: Arthropoda
- Class: Insecta
- Order: Lepidoptera
- Family: Tortricidae
- Genus: Henricus
- Species: H. fuscodorsana

Binomial name
- Henricus fuscodorsana (Kearfott, 1904)

Synonyms
- Commophila fuscodorsana Kearfott, 1904

= Henricus fuscodorsana =

Cone cochylid moth

Species of moth

Henricus fuscodorsana, the cone cochylid moth, is a species of moth of the family Tortricidae. It is found in western North America, where it has been recorded from Arizona, British Columbia, California, Colorado, Idaho, Oregon and Washington.

The wingspan is 17–18 mm. Adults have been recorded on wing from April to October.

The larvae mine the cones of Picea species (including Picea pungens), as well as Pseudotsuga, Sequoia, Abies and Larix species. They are reddish green.
