= Henricus melanoleuca =

Scientific classification
- Domain: Eukaryota
- Kingdom: Animalia
- Phylum: Arthropoda
- Class: Insecta
- Order: Lepidoptera
- Family: Tortricidae
- Genus: Henricus
- Species: H. melanoleuca

Binomial name
- Henricus melanoleuca (Clarke, 1968)

Synonyms
- Irazona melanoleuca Clarke, 1968

Species of moth

Henricus melanoleuca is a species of moth of the family Tortricidae. It is found in Mexico (Puebla, Tamaulipas) and Ecuador (Carchi Province).
