= Henricus infernalis =

Scientific classification
- Domain: Eukaryota
- Kingdom: Animalia
- Phylum: Arthropoda
- Class: Insecta
- Order: Lepidoptera
- Family: Tortricidae
- Genus: Henricus
- Species: H. infernalis

Binomial name
- Henricus infernalis (Heinrich, 1920)

Synonyms
- Commophila infernalis Heinrich, 1920; Henricus brevipalpata McDunnough, 1944

Species of moth

Henricus infernalis is a species of moth of the family Tortricidae. It is found in North America from Texas to Arizona, north to Utah, eastern British Columbia and Nebraska. The habitat consists of juniper woodlands.

The length of the forewings is 6–7.5 mm. Adults have been recorded on wing from May to August.

The larvae have been recorded feeding on the berries of Juniperus scopulorum.
