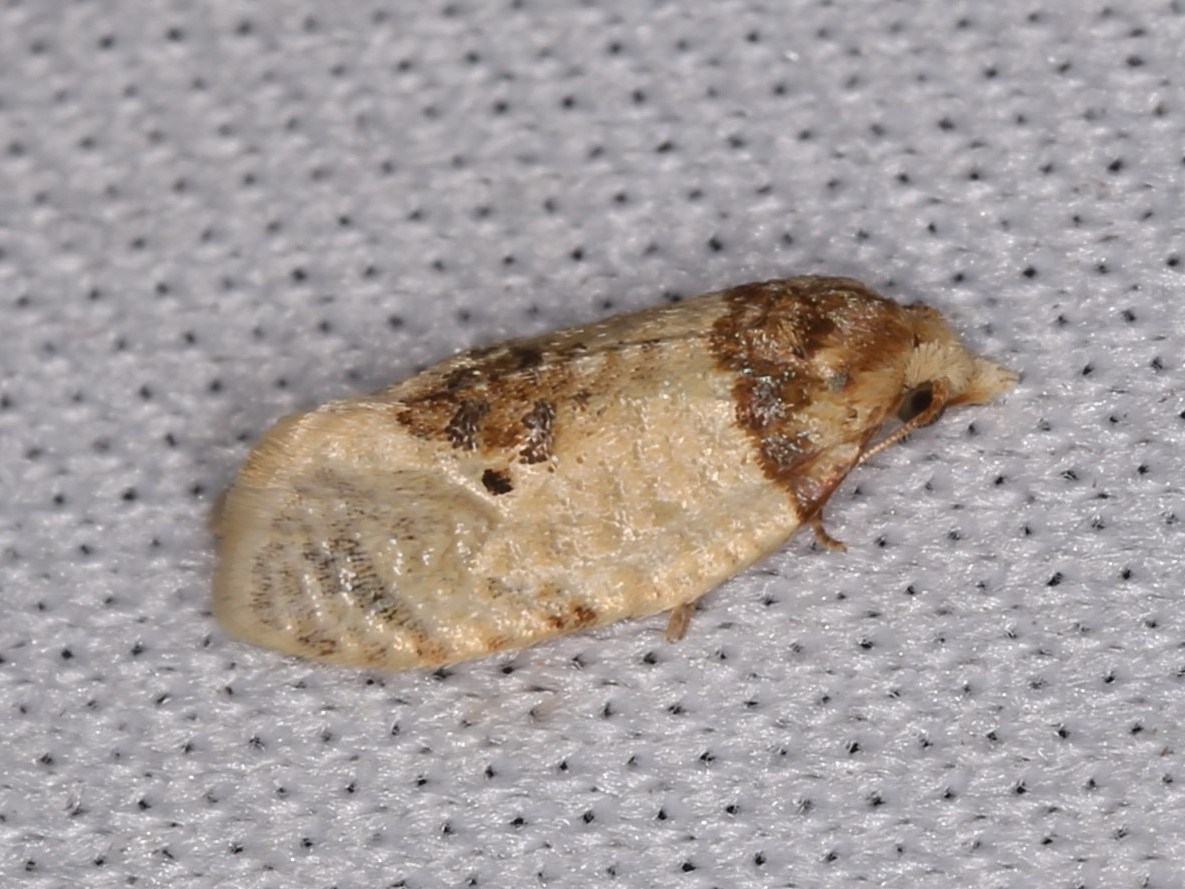
- Henricus umbrabasana

Scientific classification
- Kingdom: Animalia
- Phylum: Arthropoda
- Clade: Pancrustacea
- Class: Insecta
- Order: Lepidoptera
- Family: Tortricidae
- Tribe: Cochylini
- Genus: Henricus; Busck, 1943

Synonyms
- Heinrichia Busck, 1939 [preoccupied]; Irazona Razowski, 1964

= Henricus (moth) =

Genus of tortrix moths

Henricus is a genus of moths belonging to the family Tortricidae.

== Species ==
- Henricus acosmetes (Razowski, 1986)
- Henricus ademonia (Clarke, 1968)
- Henricus ateleutus Razowski, 1991
- Henricus attalus Razowski, 1994
- Henricus bibelonus Razowski & Becker, 2007
- Henricus bleptus Razowski & Becker, 2007
- Henricus ceramocerus Razowski, 1999
- Henricus cerussatus Razowski & Wojtusiak, 2006
- Henricus charagus Razowski, 1991
- Henricus chriograptus Razowski, 1999
- Henricus chroicopterus Razowski, 1991
- Henricus cognata (Walsingham, 1914)
- Henricus comes (Walsingham, 1884)
- Henricus contrastana (Kearfott, 1907)
- Henricus cristobalicus Razowski, 1999
- Henricus cuspis Razowski & Becker, 2007
- Henricus edwardsiana (Walsingham, 1884)
- Henricus ellampus Razowski, 1992
- Henricus exploratus Razowski & Becker, 1986
- Henricus exsanguis Razowski, 1994
- Henricus flebilis Razowski, 1994
- Henricus fuscodorsana (Kearfott, 1904)
- Henricus generosus Razowski, 1994
- Henricus glaesarius Razowski & Wojtusiak, 2006
- Henricus hemitelius Razowski, 1991
- Henricus icogramma (Clarke, 1968)
- Henricus improvisus Razowski & Becker, 1986
- Henricus inanimalis Razowski & Becker, 1986
- Henricus inchoatus Razowski & Becker, 1986
- Henricus infernalis (Heinrich, 1920)
- Henricus insolitus Razowski & Becker, 1986
- Henricus inspergatus Razowski & Becker, 1986
- Henricus macrocarpana (Walsingham, 1895)
- Henricus melanoleuca (Clarke, 1968)
- Henricus metalliferus Razowski & Pelz, 2001
- Henricus montanus Razowski & Wojtusiak, 2006
- Henricus montuosus Razowski & Becker, 2002
- Henricus ophryodes (Meyrick, 1927)
- Henricus palimpsestus Razowski & Becker, 1986
- Henricus pampasianus Razowski & Wojtusiak, 2008
- Henricus paredrus Razowski, 1991
- Henricus parmulus Razowski, 1991
- Henricus perissus Razowski & Becker, 2007
- Henricus platanillanus Razowski & Becker, 2007
- Henricus platina (Clarke, 1968)
- Henricus powelli Razowski, 1984
- Henricus rhiobursa Razowski, 1991
- Henricus rubrograptus Razowski, 1991
- Henricus sangayanus Razowski & Wojtusiak, 2009
- Henricus tenerima (Razowski, 1986)
- Henricus tingomariae Razowski & Wojtusiak, 2010
- Henricus turbula (Clarke, 1968)
- Henricus umbrabasana (Kearfott, 1908)
- Henricus zelotes Razowski & Becker, 1986

== See also ==
- List of Tortricidae genera
