= Gerhard Haszprunar =

Austrian zoologist and malacologist

Gerhard Haszprunar (born 25 February 1957 in Vienna) is an Austrian zoologist and malacologist.

He is credited with the invention of the modern species naming patronage model and is a founder of the BIOPAT non-profit organization.

== Honours and awards ==
- Cardinal Innitzer prize (for the Habilitation) (1989)
- Prize of the city of Innsbruck for scientific research at the University of Innsbruck for the project "Monoplacophora" (with Dr. Kurt Schaefer) (1994)
- Austrian Cross of Honour for Science and Art (2008)
