= Henricus powelli =

Scientific classification
- Kingdom: Animalia
- Phylum: Arthropoda
- Class: Insecta
- Order: Lepidoptera
- Family: Tortricidae
- Genus: Henricus
- Species: H. powelli

Binomial name
- Henricus powelli Razowski, 1984

Species of moth

Henricus powelli is a species of moth of the family Tortricidae. It is found in Mexico in the states of Tamaulipas, Nuevo León and Veracruz.
