= Henricus ophryodes =

Scientific classification
- Kingdom: Animalia
- Phylum: Arthropoda
- Class: Insecta
- Order: Lepidoptera
- Family: Tortricidae
- Genus: Henricus
- Species: H. ophryodes

Binomial name
- Henricus ophryodes (Meyrick, 1927)

Synonyms
- Phtheochroa ophryodes Meyrick, 1927

Species of moth

Henricus ophryodes is a species of moth of the family Tortricidae. It is found in Costa Rica.
