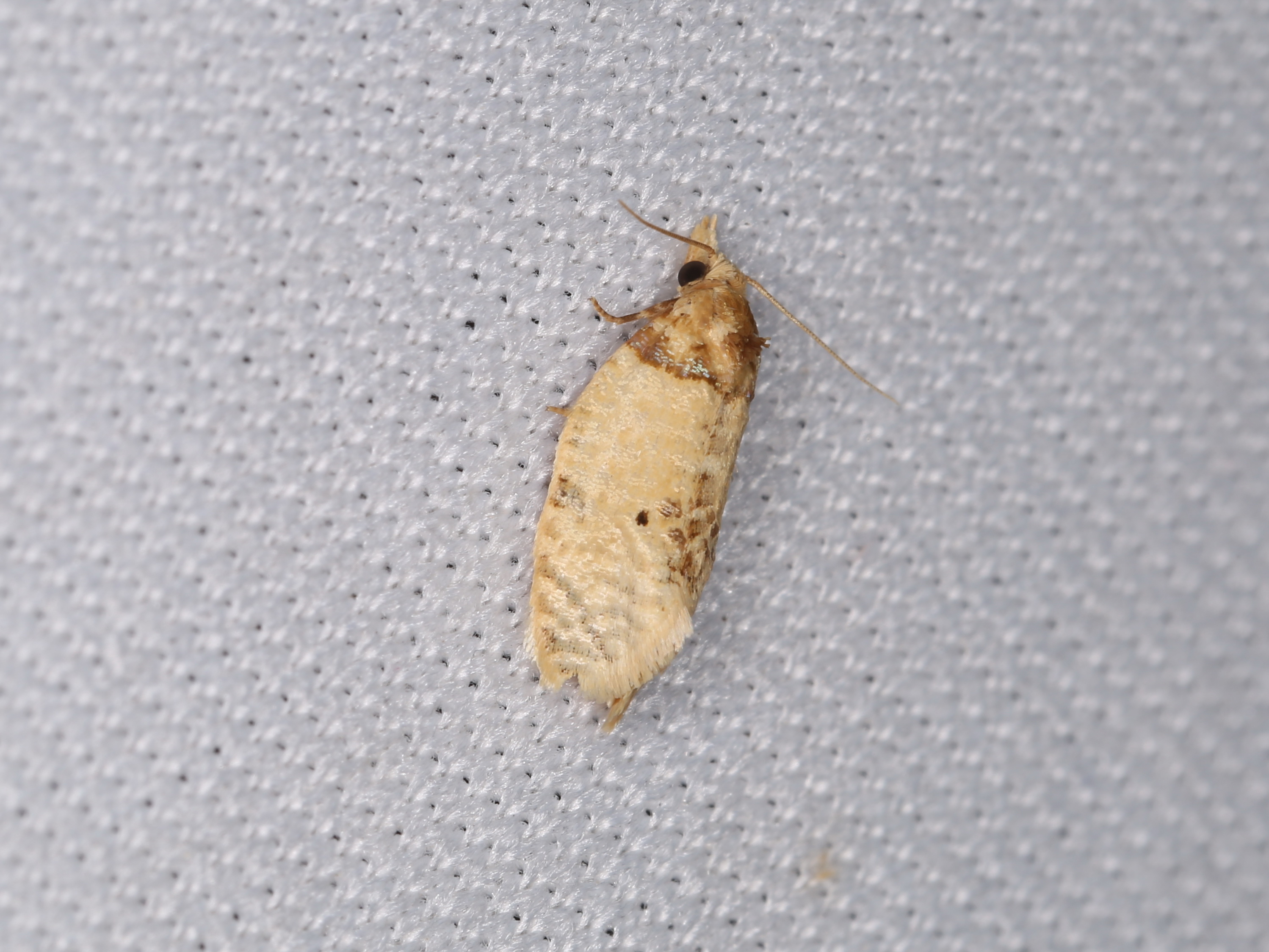

Scientific classification
- Domain: Eukaryota
- Kingdom: Animalia
- Phylum: Arthropoda
- Class: Insecta
- Order: Lepidoptera
- Family: Tortricidae
- Genus: Henricus
- Species: H. umbrabasana

Binomial name
- Henricus umbrabasana (Kearfott, 1908)

Synonyms
- Commophila umbrabasana Kearfott, 1908

= Henricus umbrabasana =

Species of moth

Henricus umbrabasana is a species of moth of the family Tortricidae. It is found in the United States, where it has been recorded from California and south-western Washington. It possibly also occurs in Oregon.

The length of the forewings is 7.5–9 mm.
