= Henricus palimpsestus =

Scientific classification
- Kingdom: Animalia
- Phylum: Arthropoda
- Clade: Pancrustacea
- Class: Insecta
- Order: Lepidoptera
- Family: Tortricidae
- Genus: Henricus
- Species: H. palimpsestus

Binomial name
- Henricus palimpsestus Razowski & Becker, 1986

Species of moth

Henricus palimpsestus is a species of moth of the family Tortricidae. It is found in Veracruz, Mexico.
