= Henricus acosmetes =

Scientific classification
- Domain: Eukaryota
- Kingdom: Animalia
- Phylum: Arthropoda
- Class: Insecta
- Order: Lepidoptera
- Family: Tortricidae
- Genus: Henricus
- Species: H. acosmetes

Binomial name
- Henricus acosmetes (Razowski, 1986)

Synonyms
- Phtheochroa acosmetes Razowski, 1986

Species of moth

Henricus acosmetes is a species of moth of the family Tortricidae. It was first described, as Phtheochroa acosmetes, by Józef Razowski, with a type locality in Durango, Mexico.
