= Tingo María National Park =

- Parque Nacional Tingo María
- IUCN category II (national park)
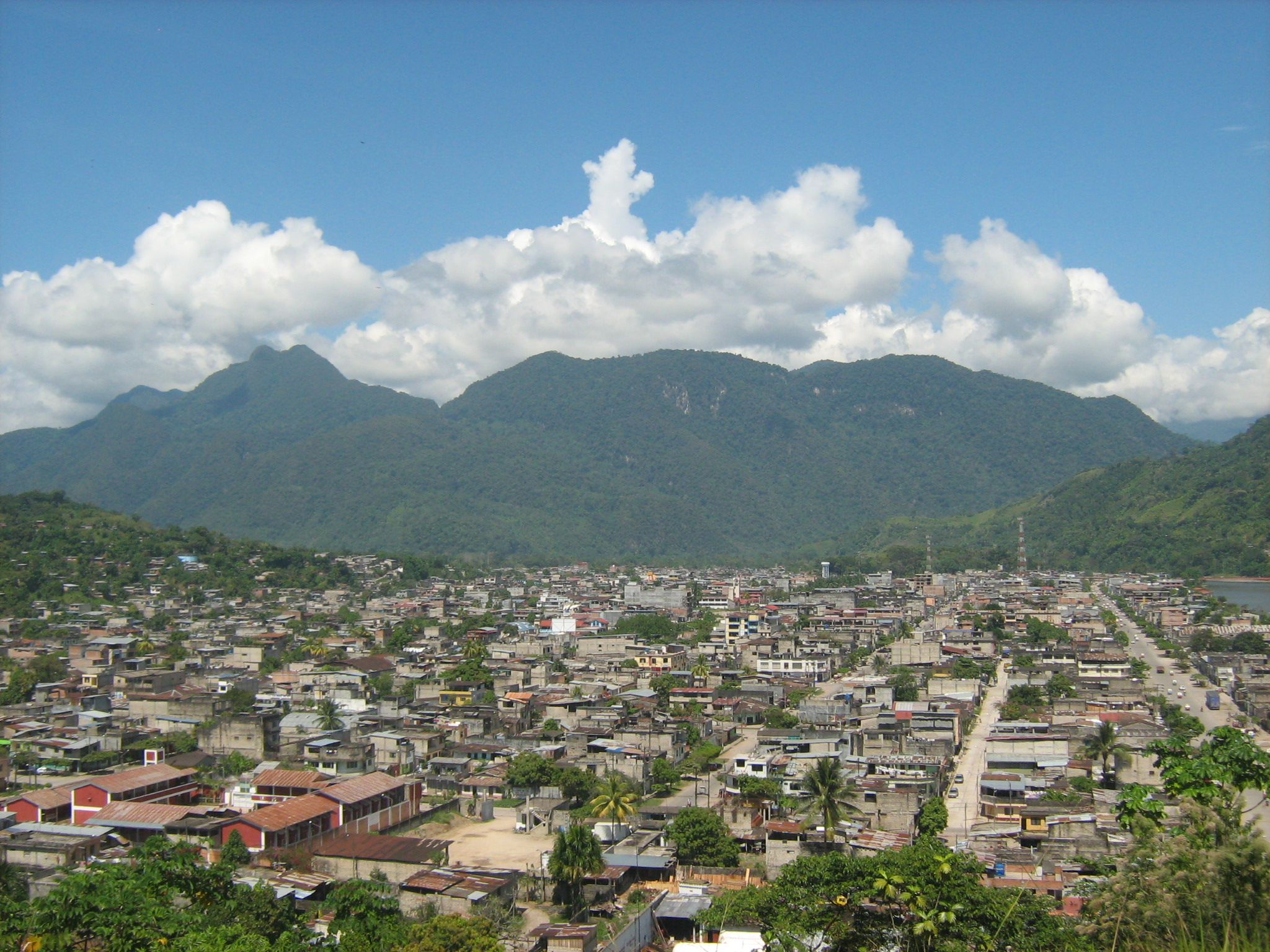
- La Bella Durmiente, a small massif in Tingo María National Park, viewed from the town of Tingo María

- Location within Peru
- Location: Peru; Huánuco
- Nearest city: Tingo María
- Coordinates: 9.377°S 75.998°W
- Area: 4,777.8 hectares (18.447 sq mi)
- Established: May 14, 1965
- Governing body: SERNANP
- Website: Parque Nacional Tingo María

Tingo María National Park (Spanish: Parque Nacional Tingo María) is located in the districts of Rupa Rupa and Mariano Dámaso, in the region of Huánuco, Peru. It was established on May 14, 1965 and its main attractions are the montane forest vegetation and the cave named Cueva de las Lechuzas (Spanish for Cave of the Owls) where the oilbirds nest. The park has an area of 4,777 hectares (18.44 sq mi) that include a mountain massif called La Bella Durmiente (Spanish for Sleeping Beauty).

== History ==
In 1940, 2 years after the foundation of the nearby town of Tingo María, some forest areas were spared from human development to create a new protected natural area.

In 1950, during the dictatorship of Manuel A. Odría, a protected area called Cueva de las Lechuzas National Reserve was created in the area of the future national park.

On May 14, 1965, Tingo María National Park was established by Law No. 15574, which stated that the area include the Bella Durmiente massif, the cave named Cueva de Las Lechuzas and adjacent forests. However, the law didn't specify the total area or the boundaries of the park.

In 2000, boundaries were defined and the total area was fixed at 4777,8 hectares.

== Geography ==
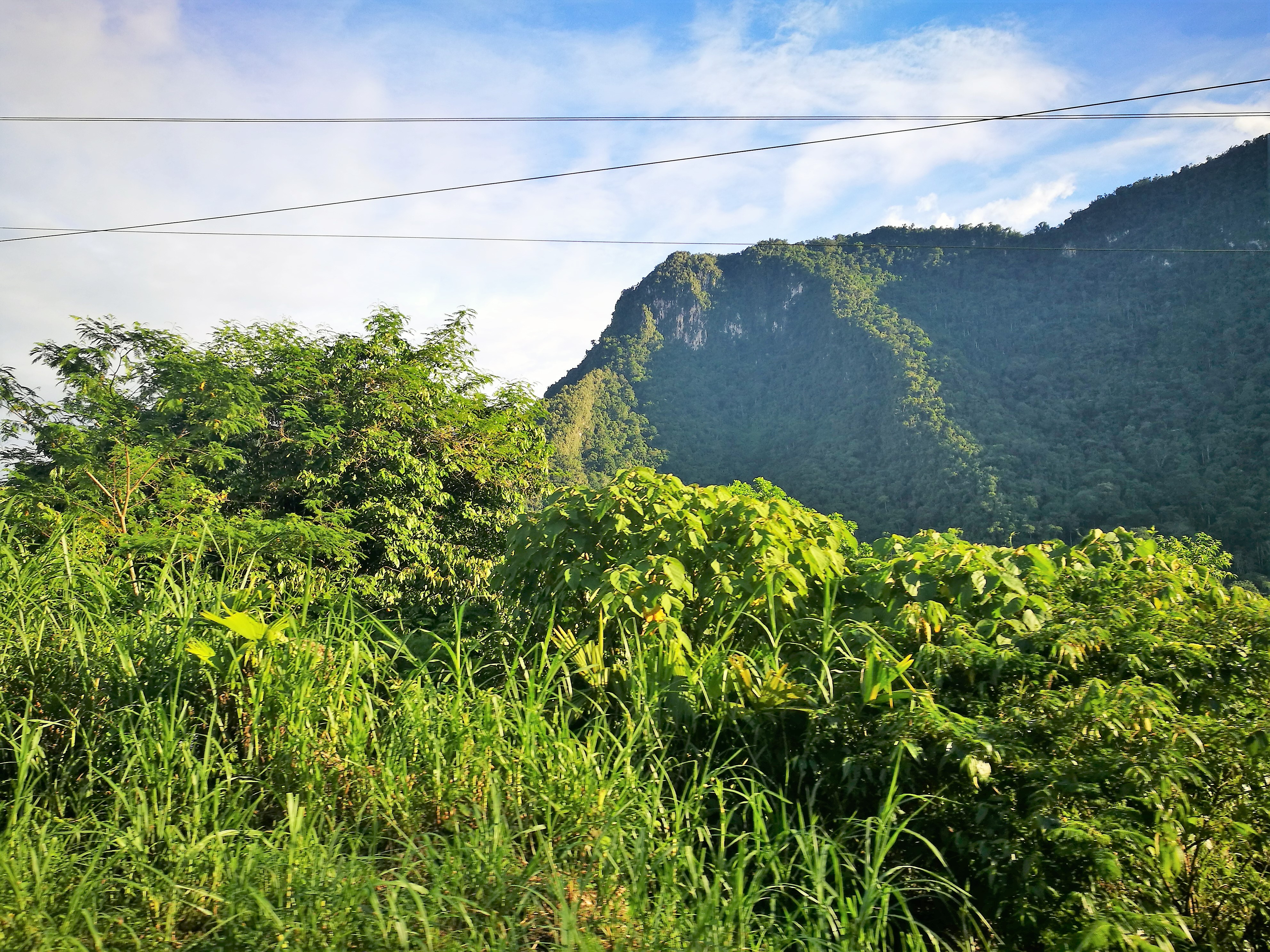
Owl Cave inside the national park

Tingo María

Climate chart (precipitation, max. and min. temperature)
J	F	M	A	M	J	J	A	S	O	N	D
418 30 19	357 30 19	331 30 19	267 31 19	209 31 19	130 31 18	130 31 18	112 31 18	158 31 18	268 31 18	313 31 19	349 31 19
- █ Average max. and min. temperatures in °C
- █ Precipitation totals in mm
- Source: Climate-Data.org
Imperial conversion
J	F	M	A	M	J	J	A	S	O	N	D
16 86 66	14 86 66	13 86 66	11 87 66	8.2 87 66	5.1 87 64	5.1 87 64	4.4 87 64	6.2 88 64	11 87 64	12 88 66	14 87 66
- █ Average max. and min. temperatures in °F
- █ Precipitation totals in inches

Topography in the park is steep and mountainous, because the Bella Durmiente massif occupies almost of its entire extension. Elevations in the park are in the range of 650–1808 m; rocky walls of 300–500 m in height are common. Soils are calcareous, rocky and thin, and landslides due to natural causes or past attempts of agriculture do occur.

Tingo María National Park is located at the confluence of the rivers Huallaga and Monzón (the name tingo, comes from Quechua for confluence or meeting). Due to the calcareous nature of the mountains, several rivers in the park have eroded the rock to form underground courses.

== Climate ==
The rainy season in the area goes from October to April, with a mean annual precipitation of 3300 mm. Access to the park in that season is limited due to weather conditions. The annual temperatures in the area have a maximum of 29.8 °C and a minimum of 19.2 °C, being the annual mean 24.5 °C.

== Ecology ==
=== Flora ===
Vegetation in the park is characterized by the presence of very humid montane forests frequently covered with mist, and trees covered with epiphyte plants, mosses and lichens due to humidity.

Among the most notable plant species in the park are trees like cedro colorado (Cedrela odorata), palo blanco (Cinchona pubescens), cumala blanca (Virola calophylla), cumala colorada (Iryanthera laevis), quinilla (Manilkara bidentata subsp. surinamensis), sapotillo (Quararibea macrocalyx), tulpay (Clarisia racemosa) and lagarto caspi (Calophyllum brasiliense); palms like huasaí (Euterpe precatoria), ungurahui (Oenocarpus bataua), pona (Iriartea deltoidea), yarina (Phytelephas macrocarpa) and palmiche (Geonoma spp.); tree ferns (Cyathea spp.) and numerous orchids, being the most frequent Phragmipedium spp. (although Phragmipedium besseae is a threatened species).

=== Fauna ===
Among the mammals present in the park are the South American tapir, the red brocket, the collared peccary, the ocelot, the black-capped squirrel monkey, the brown-mantled tamarin monkey, the red-faced spider monkey, the nine-banded armadillo, the pacarana, the Northern Amazon red squirrel, the kinkajou, and the South American coati.

Birds reported in the area are the Andean cock-of-the-rock, the oilbird, the white-eyed parakeet, Salvin's curassow, Spix's guan, the blue-headed parrot, the king vulture, the Amazonian motmot, among others.

== Activities ==
Birdwatching, hiking, ecotourism and cultural tourism are the main activities in the area.

== Environmental issues ==
Environmental issues that affect the biodiversity of this national park are: the extraction of wood for construction or fuel; the clearance of forest for agricultural crops, coca and pastures; uncontrolled tourism; hunting; fishing with toxins and explosives; the noise of helicopters departing from a nearby airbase; obstruction of an underground river due to debris from deforestation by nearby villages; and the extraction of gravel and other construction materials.

== See also ==
- La Bella Durmiente, Peru
