= Leoncio Prado province =

Coordinates: 9°17′24″S 75°59′24″W

Leoncio Prado
- Province
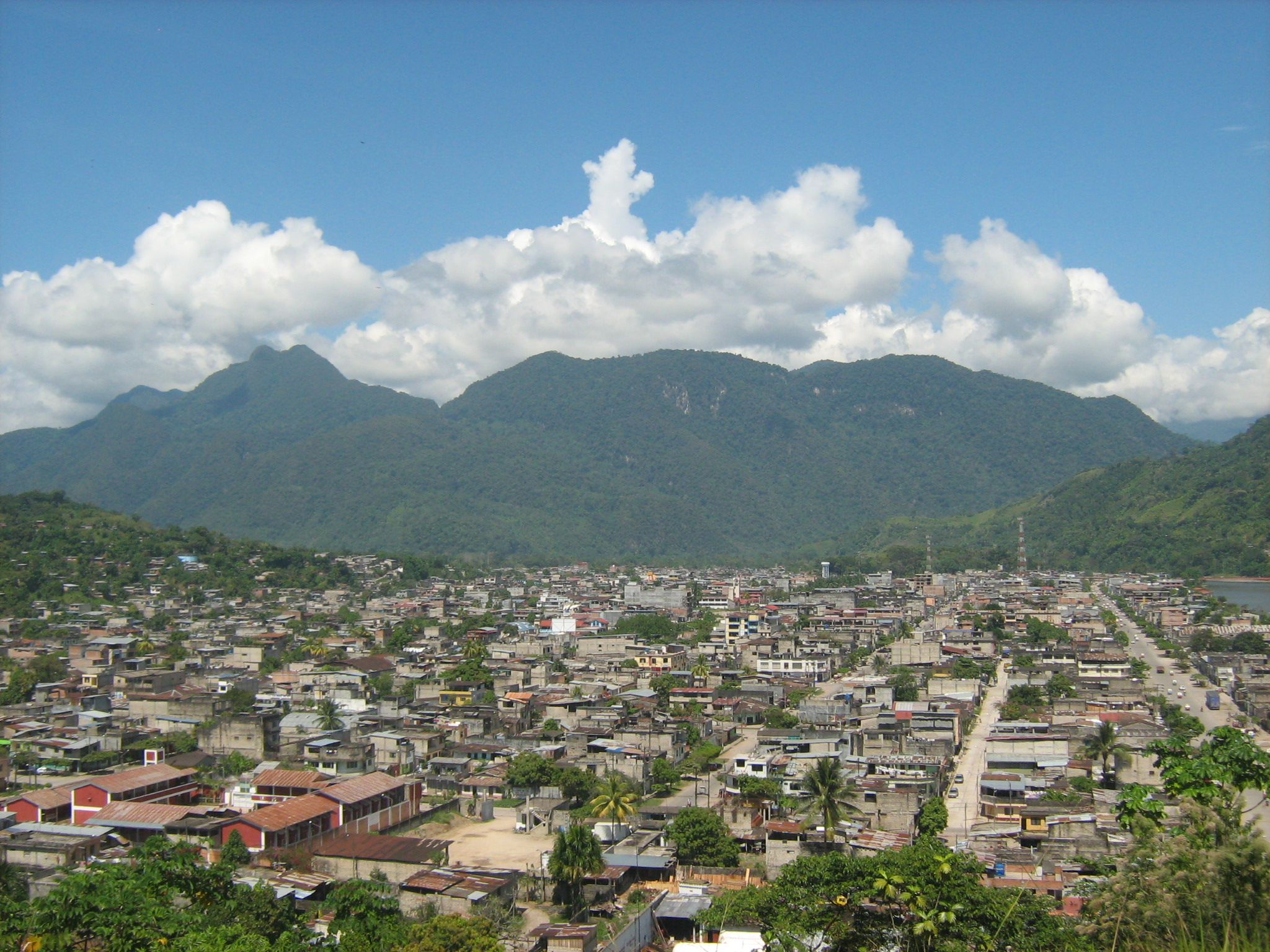
- The town Tingo María with the mountains named "The Sleeping Beauty" in the background

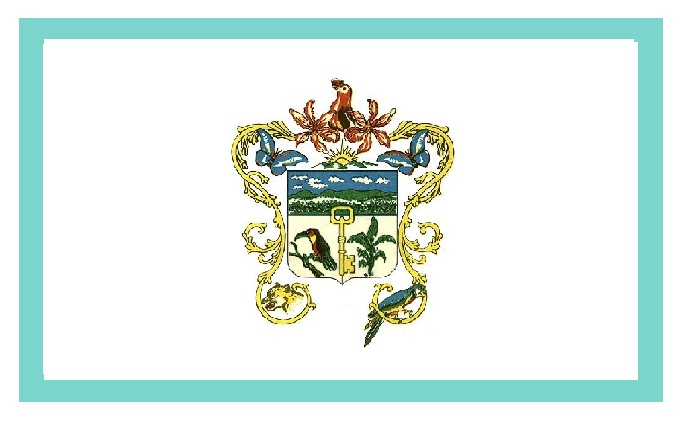
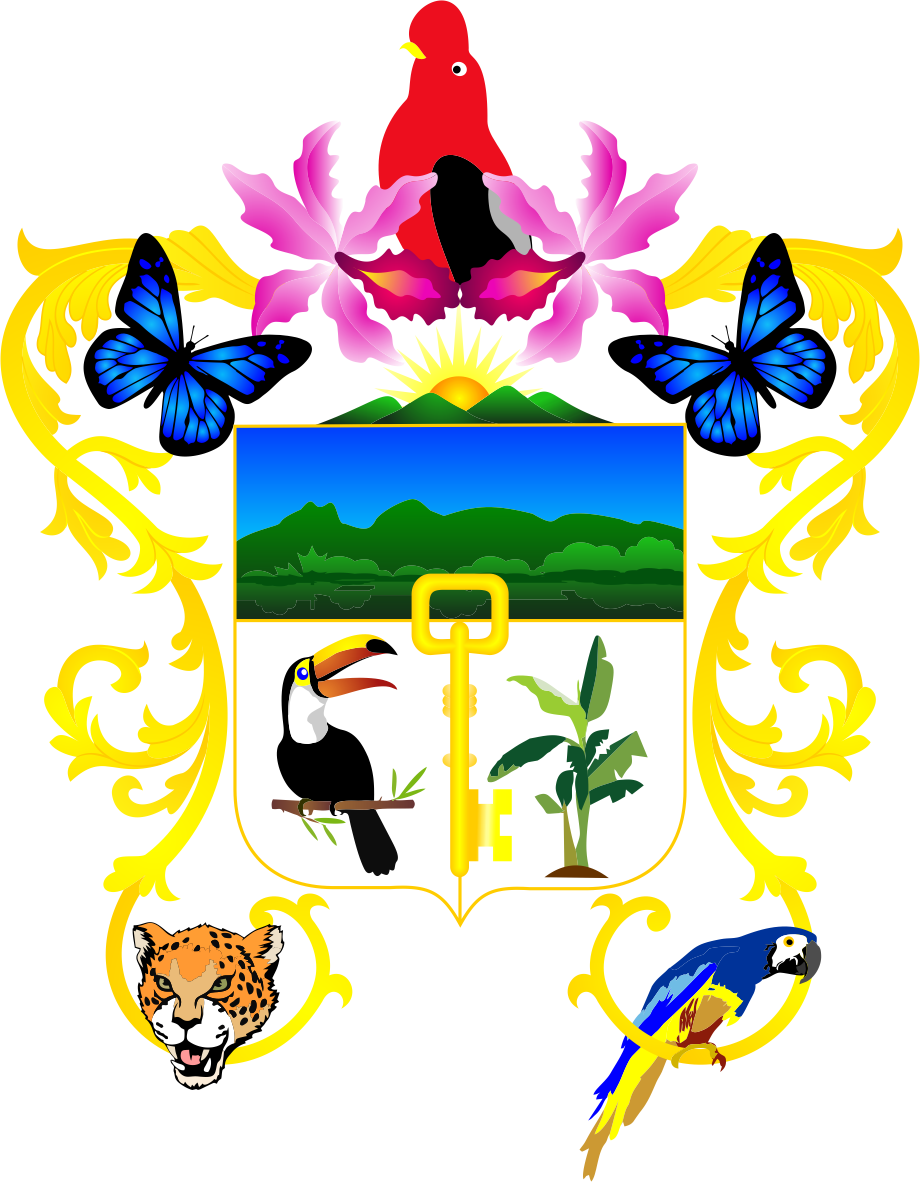
- Flag Coat of arms

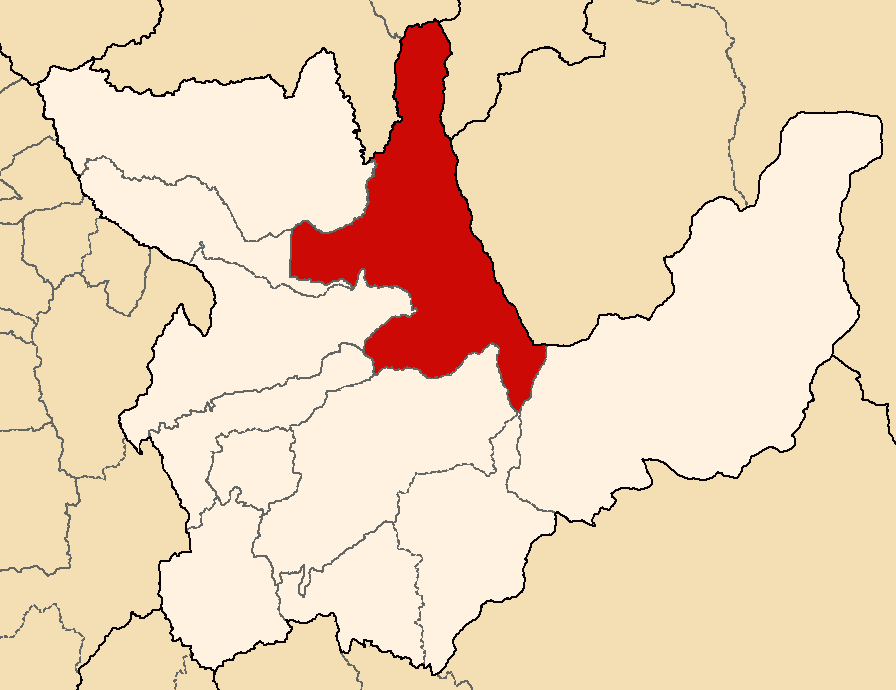
- Location of Leoncio Prado in the Huánuco Region
- Country: Peru
- Region: Huánuco
- Capital: Tingo María

Government
  - Mayor: Miguel Angel Meza Malpartida

Area
  - Total: 4,952.99 km^{2} (1,912.36 sq mi)

Population
  - Total: 127,793
  - Density: 25.8012/km^{2} (66.8248/sq mi)
- UBIGEO: 1006
- Website: www.municipalidadtingomaria.com

Leoncio Prado is one of eleven provinces of the Huánuco Region in Peru. The capital of this province is the city of Tingo María.

The province was named after the Peruvian mariner Leoncio Prado Gutiérrez.

== Boundaries ==
- North: San Martín Region
- East: Ucayali Region
- South: provinces of Puerto Inca, Pachitea and Huánuco
- West: provinces of Marañón, Dos de Mayo, Huacaybamba and Huamalíes

== Political division ==
The province is divided into six districts, which are:

- Daniel Alomías Robles (Pumahuasi)
- Hermilio Valdizán (Hermilio Valdizán)
- José Crespo y Castillo (Aucayacu)
- Luyando (Naranjillo)
- Mariano Dámaso Beraun (las Palmas)
- Rupa-Rupa (Tingo María)

== Ethnic groups ==
The province is inhabited by indigenous citizens of Quechua descent. Spanish is the language which the majority of the population (91.42%) learnt to speak in childhood, 8.23% of the residents started speaking using the Quechua language (2007 Peru Census).

== See also ==
- Pumarinri
