= Henricus tenerima =

Scientific classification
- Kingdom: Animalia
- Phylum: Arthropoda
- Class: Insecta
- Order: Lepidoptera
- Family: Tortricidae
- Genus: Henricus
- Species: H. tenerima

Binomial name
- Henricus tenerima (Razowski, 1986)

Synonyms
- Phtheochroa tenerima Razowski, 1986

Species of moth

Henricus tenerima is a species of moth of the family Tortricidae. It is found in Nuevo León, Mexico.
