= Henricus montanus =

Scientific classification
- Kingdom: Animalia
- Phylum: Arthropoda
- Clade: Pancrustacea
- Class: Insecta
- Order: Lepidoptera
- Family: Tortricidae
- Genus: Henricus
- Species: H. montanus

Binomial name
- Henricus montanus Razowski & Wojtusiak, 2006

Species of moth

Henricus montanus is a species of moth of the family Tortricidae. It is found in Venezuela.

The wingspan is about 21 mm.

== Etymology ==
The species name refers to the type locality.
