= Henricus comes =

Scientific classification
- Domain: Eukaryota
- Kingdom: Animalia
- Phylum: Arthropoda
- Class: Insecta
- Order: Lepidoptera
- Family: Tortricidae
- Genus: Henricus
- Species: H. comes

Binomial name
- Henricus comes (Walsingham, 1884)

Synonyms
- Conchylis comes Walsingham, 1884

Species of moth

Henricus comes is a species of moth of the family Tortricidae. It is found in Mexico (Veracruz) and the United States (Arizona and Texas).

The wingspan is about 16 mm. Adults have been recorded on wing in April and August.

== Subspecies ==
- Henricus comes comes
- Henricus comes vicecomes Razowski & Becker, 1986 (Mexico: Veracruz)
