= Henricus flebilis =

Scientific classification
- Kingdom: Animalia
- Phylum: Arthropoda
- Class: Insecta
- Order: Lepidoptera
- Family: Tortricidae
- Genus: Henricus
- Species: H. flebilis

Binomial name
- Henricus flebilis Razowski, 1994

Species of moth

Henricus flebilis is a species of moth of the family Tortricidae. It is found in Veracruz, Mexico.
