= Henricus platanillanus =

Scientific classification
- Kingdom: Animalia
- Phylum: Arthropoda
- Clade: Pancrustacea
- Class: Insecta
- Order: Lepidoptera
- Family: Tortricidae
- Genus: Henricus
- Species: H. platanillanus

Binomial name
- Henricus platanillanus Razowski & Becker, 2007

Species of moth

Henricus platanillanus is a species of moth of the family Tortricidae. It is found in San Luis Potosí, Mexico.

The wingspan is about 11 mm.
