= Daniel Alomías Robles District =

Coordinates: 9.1884°S 75.9549°W

Daniel Alomía Robles / Pumahuasi Pumawasi
- District
- Interactive map of Daniel Alomía Robles / Pumahuasi
- Country: Peru
- Region: Huánuco
- Province: Leoncio Prado
- Founded: May 27, 1952
- Capital: Daniel Alomía Robles

Government
  - Mayor: Walter Jesús Silva Mariño

Area
  - Total: 710.91 km^{2} (274.48 sq mi)
- Elevation: 650 m (2,130 ft)

Population (2005 census)
  - Total: 6,383
  - Density: 8.979/km^{2} (23.25/sq mi)
- Time zone: UTC-5 (PET)
- UBIGEO: 100602

Daniel Alomía Robles District or Pumahuasi District is one of six districts of the province Leoncio Prado in Peru. Its seat is the town of Pumahuasi.
