= Henricus ceramocerus =

Scientific classification
- Kingdom: Animalia
- Phylum: Arthropoda
- Class: Insecta
- Order: Lepidoptera
- Family: Tortricidae
- Genus: Henricus
- Species: H. ceramocerus

Binomial name
- Henricus ceramocerus Razowski, 1999

Species of moth

Henricus ceramocerus is a species of moth of the family Tortricidae. It is found in Costa Rica.
