= Henricus chroicopterus =

Scientific classification
- Kingdom: Animalia
- Phylum: Arthropoda
- Class: Insecta
- Order: Lepidoptera
- Family: Tortricidae
- Genus: Henricus
- Species: H. chroicopterus

Binomial name
- Henricus chroicopterus Razowski, 1991

Species of moth

Henricus chroicopterus is a species of moth of the family Tortricidae. It is found in Durango, Mexico.
