= Henricus pampasianus =

Scientific classification
- Domain: Eukaryota
- Kingdom: Animalia
- Phylum: Arthropoda
- Class: Insecta
- Order: Lepidoptera
- Family: Tortricidae
- Genus: Henricus
- Species: H. pampasianus

Binomial name
- Henricus pampasianus Razowski & Wojtusiak, 2008

Species of moth

Henricus pampasianus is a species of moth of the family Tortricidae. It is found in Cotopaxi Province, Ecuador.

The wingspan is about 22 mm.

== Etymology ==
The species name refers to the type locality of San Francisco de las Pampas.
