= Henricus exsanguis =

Scientific classification
- Kingdom: Animalia
- Phylum: Arthropoda
- Class: Insecta
- Order: Lepidoptera
- Family: Tortricidae
- Genus: Henricus
- Species: H. exsanguis

Binomial name
- Henricus exsanguis Razowski, 1994

Species of moth

Henricus exsanguis is a species of moth of the family Tortricidae. It is found in Costa Rica.
