= Henricus glaesarius =

Scientific classification
- Kingdom: Animalia
- Phylum: Arthropoda
- Clade: Pancrustacea
- Class: Insecta
- Order: Lepidoptera
- Family: Tortricidae
- Genus: Henricus
- Species: H. glaesarius

Binomial name
- Henricus glaesarius Razowski & Wojtusiak, 2006

Species of moth

Henricus glaesarius is a species of moth of the family Tortricidae. It is found in Venezuela.

The wingspan is about 24 mm.
