= Henricus metalliferus =

Scientific classification
- Kingdom: Animalia
- Phylum: Arthropoda
- Class: Insecta
- Order: Lepidoptera
- Family: Tortricidae
- Genus: Henricus
- Species: H. metalliferus

Binomial name
- Henricus metalliferus Razowski & Pelz, 2001

Species of moth

Henricus metalliferus is a species of moth of the family Tortricidae. It is found in Morona-Santiago Province, Ecuador.
