= Henricus montuosus =

Scientific classification
- Kingdom: Animalia
- Phylum: Arthropoda
- Clade: Pancrustacea
- Class: Insecta
- Order: Lepidoptera
- Family: Tortricidae
- Genus: Henricus
- Species: H. montuosus

Binomial name
- Henricus montuosus Razowski & Becker, 2002

Species of moth

Henricus montuosus is a species of moth of the family Tortricidae. It is found in Costa Rica.

The wingspan is about 20 mm.
