= Henricus cerussatus =

Scientific classification
- Kingdom: Animalia
- Phylum: Arthropoda
- Class: Insecta
- Order: Lepidoptera
- Family: Tortricidae
- Genus: Henricus
- Species: H. cerussatus

Binomial name
- Henricus cerussatus Razowski & Wojtusiak, 2006

Species of moth

Henricus cerussatus is a species of moth of the family Tortricidae. It is known from Morona-Santiago Province, Ecuador. The holotype was obtained at 2,200 m (7,200 ft) above sea level.

The wingspan of the holotype, a male, is 27.5 millimetres (1.08 in).
