= Henricus contrastana =

Contrasting henricus moth

Scientific classification
- Domain: Eukaryota
- Kingdom: Animalia
- Phylum: Arthropoda
- Class: Insecta
- Order: Lepidoptera
- Family: Tortricidae
- Genus: Henricus
- Species: H. contrastana

Binomial name
- Henricus contrastana (Kearfott, 1907)

Synonyms
- Commophila contrastana Kearfott, 1907

Species of moth

Henricus contrastana, the contrasting henricus moth, is a species of moth of the family Tortricidae. It is found from Michigan and Connecticut to Florida, in the south west to California.

The wingspan is 17–21 mm. Adults have been recorded on wing from April to July.
