= Henricus perissus =

Scientific classification
- Kingdom: Animalia
- Phylum: Arthropoda
- Clade: Pancrustacea
- Class: Insecta
- Order: Lepidoptera
- Family: Tortricidae
- Genus: Henricus
- Species: H. perissus

Binomial name
- Henricus perissus Razowski & Becker, 2007

Species of moth

Henricus perissus is a species of moth of the family Tortricidae. It is found in Carchi Province, Ecuador.

The wingspan is about 17.5 mm.

== Etymology ==
The species name refers to the shape of the bursa copulatrix and is derived from Greek perisson (meaning uneven).
