= Henricus sangayanus =

Scientific classification
- Domain: Eukaryota
- Kingdom: Animalia
- Phylum: Arthropoda
- Class: Insecta
- Order: Lepidoptera
- Family: Tortricidae
- Genus: Henricus
- Species: H. sangayanus

Binomial name
- Henricus sangayanus Razowski & Wojtusiak, 2009

Species of moth

Henricus sangayanus is a species of moth belonging to the family Tortricidae. It is found in Ecuador.

The wingspan is about 24.5 mm.

== Etymology ==
The name refers to the type locality, Sangay National Park in Morona-Santiago Province.
