= Tingo María =

- City
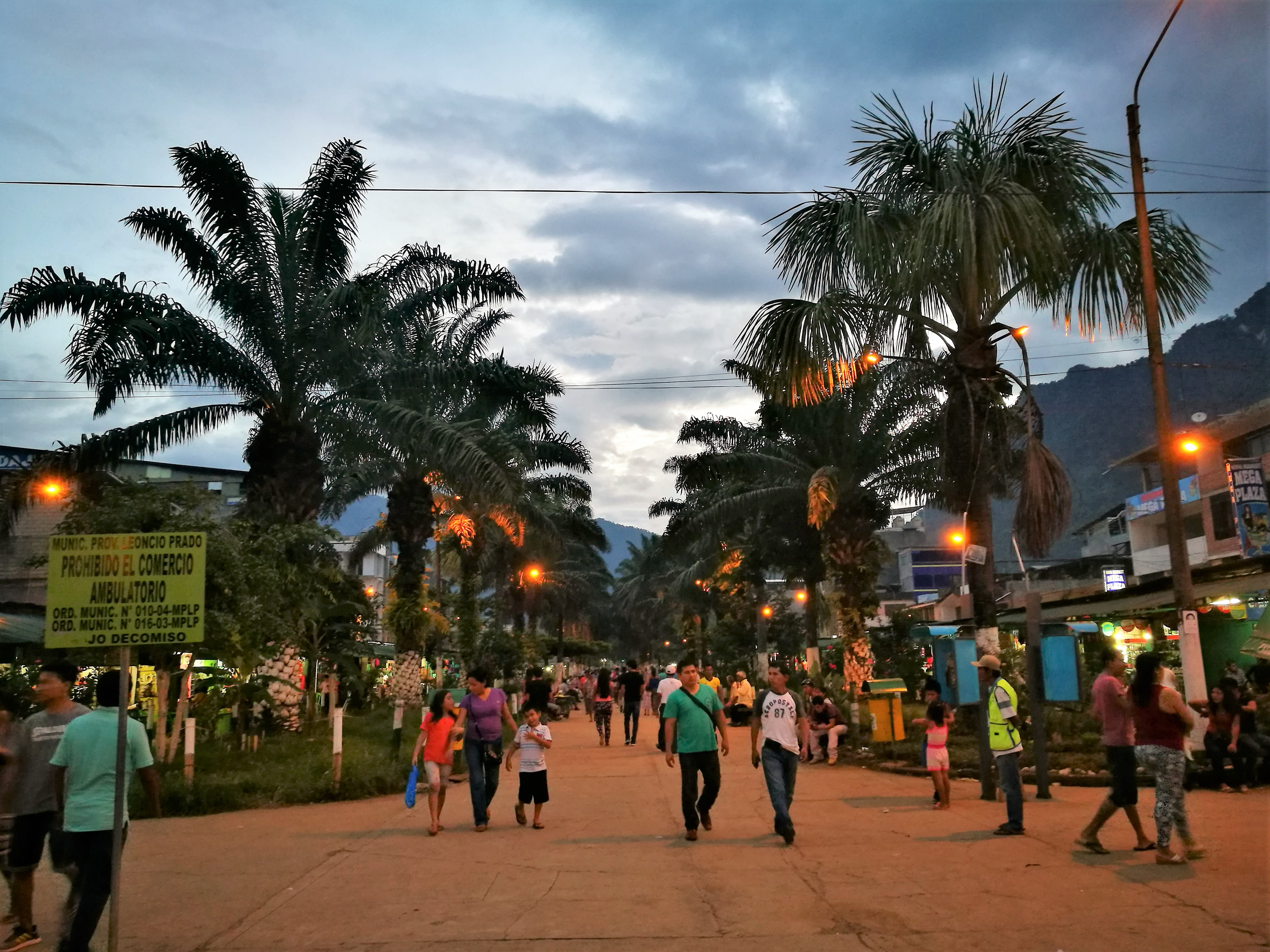
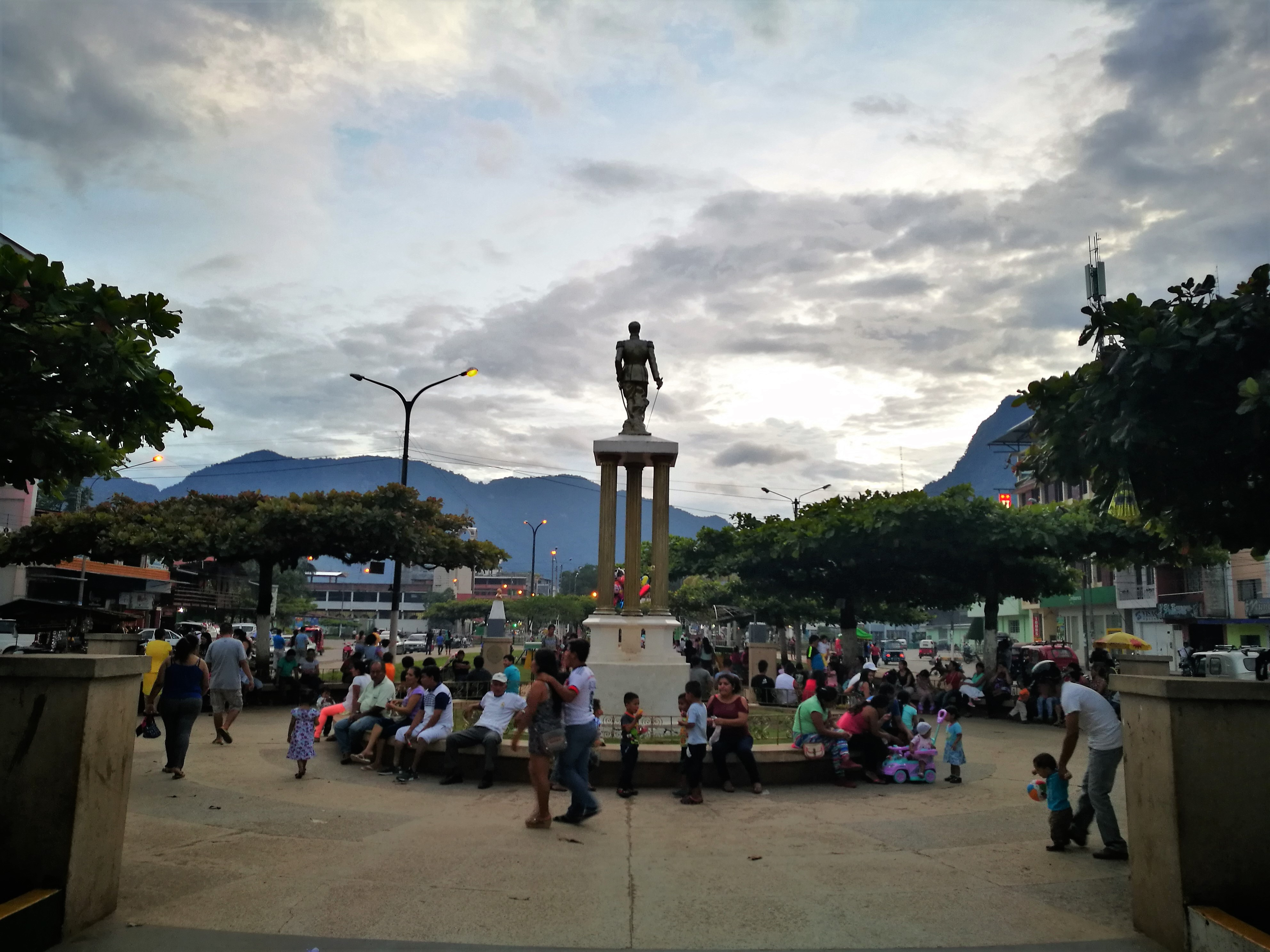
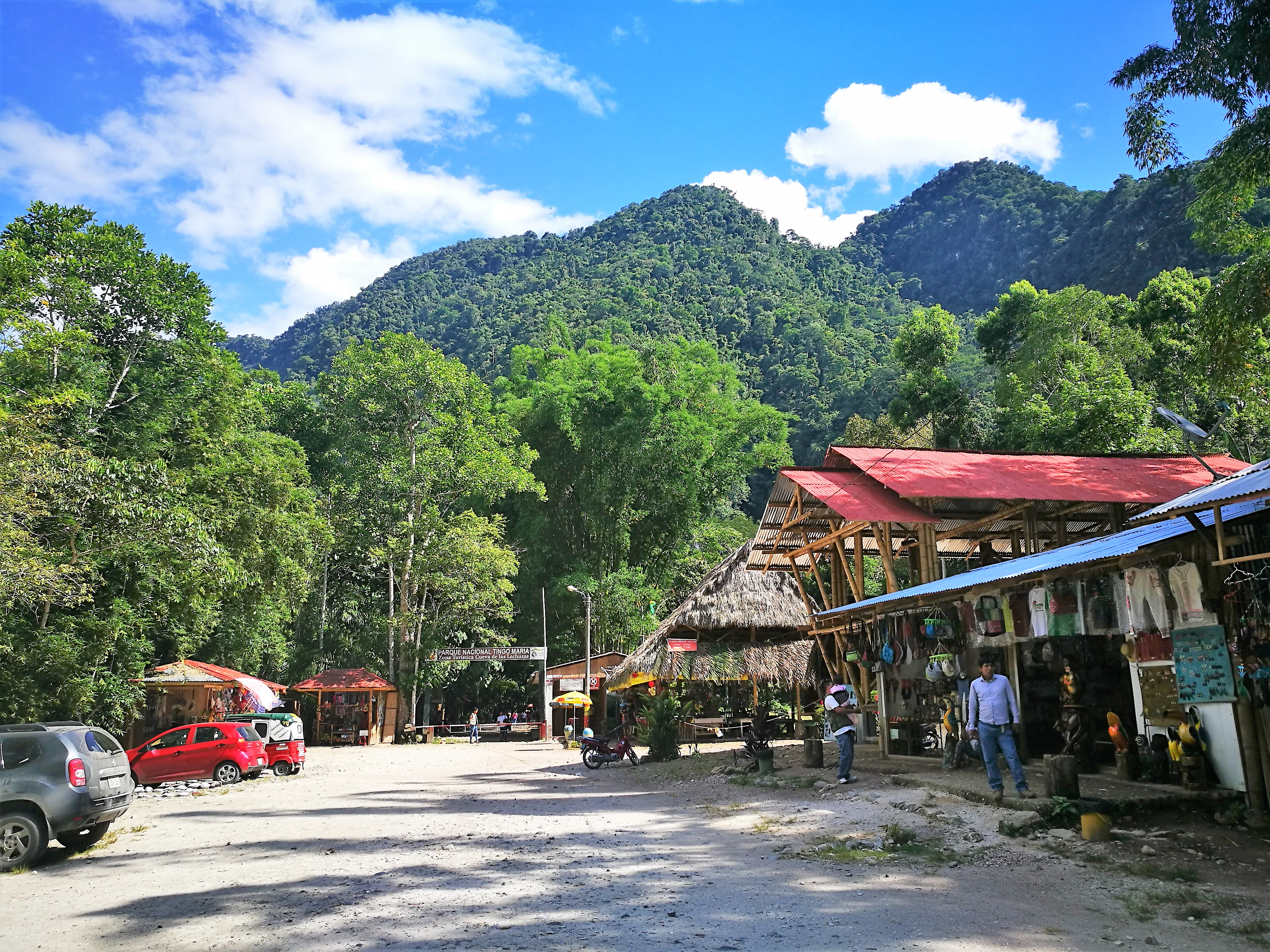
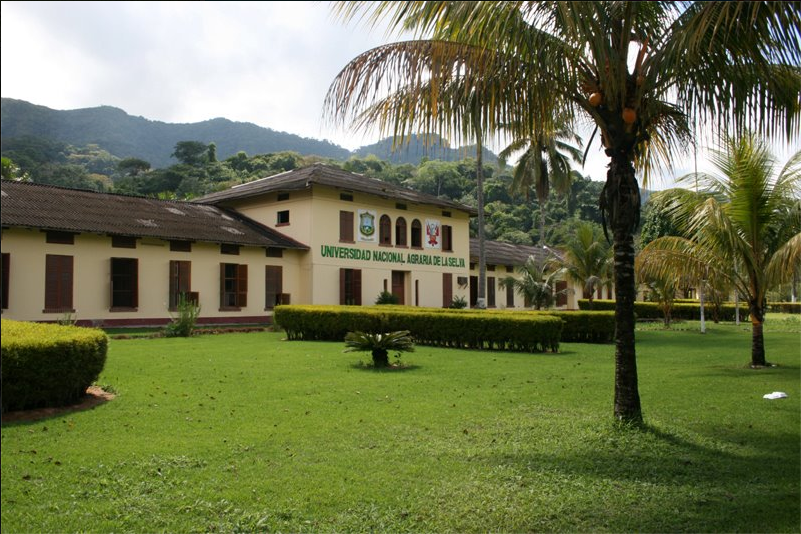
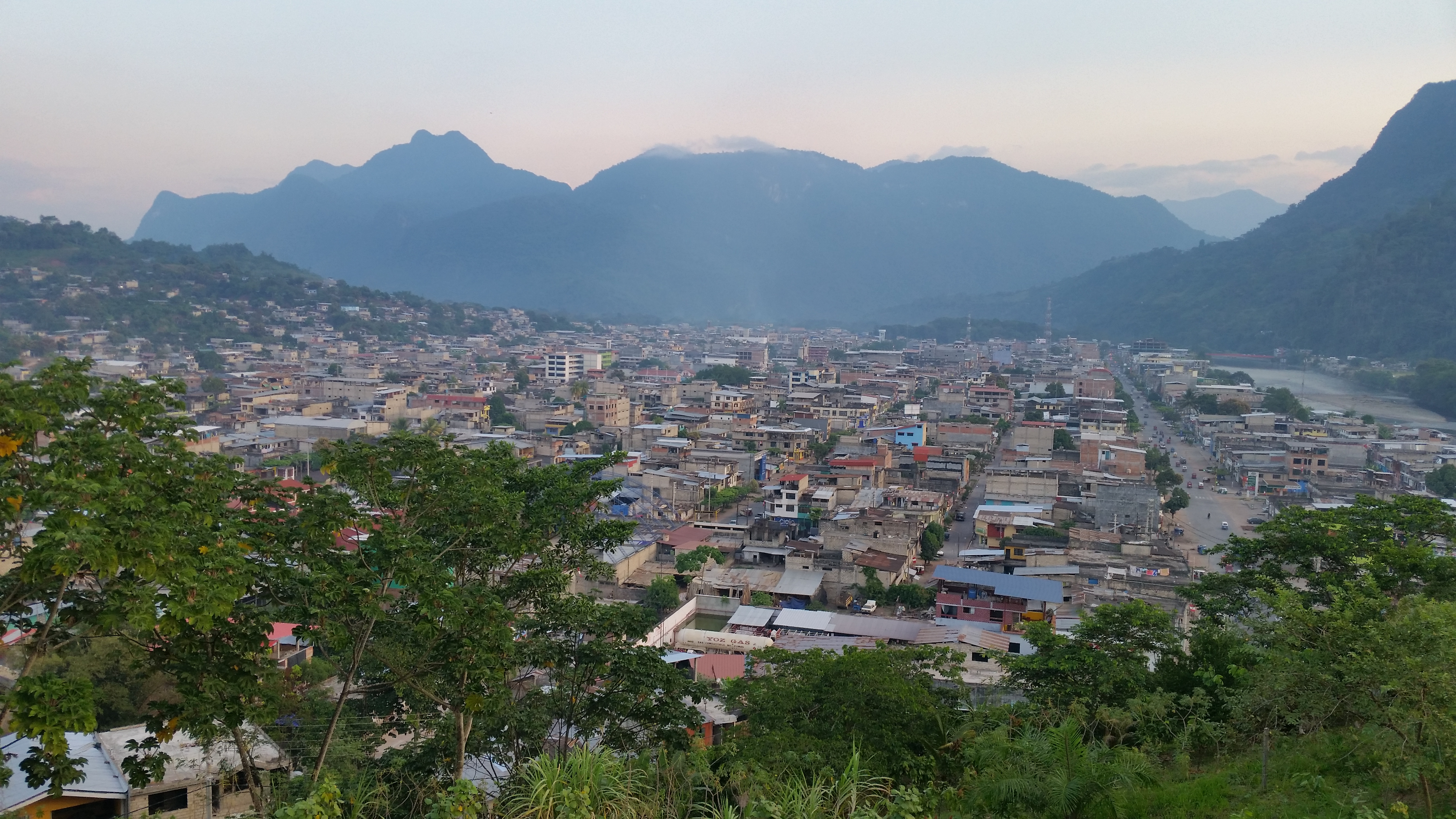

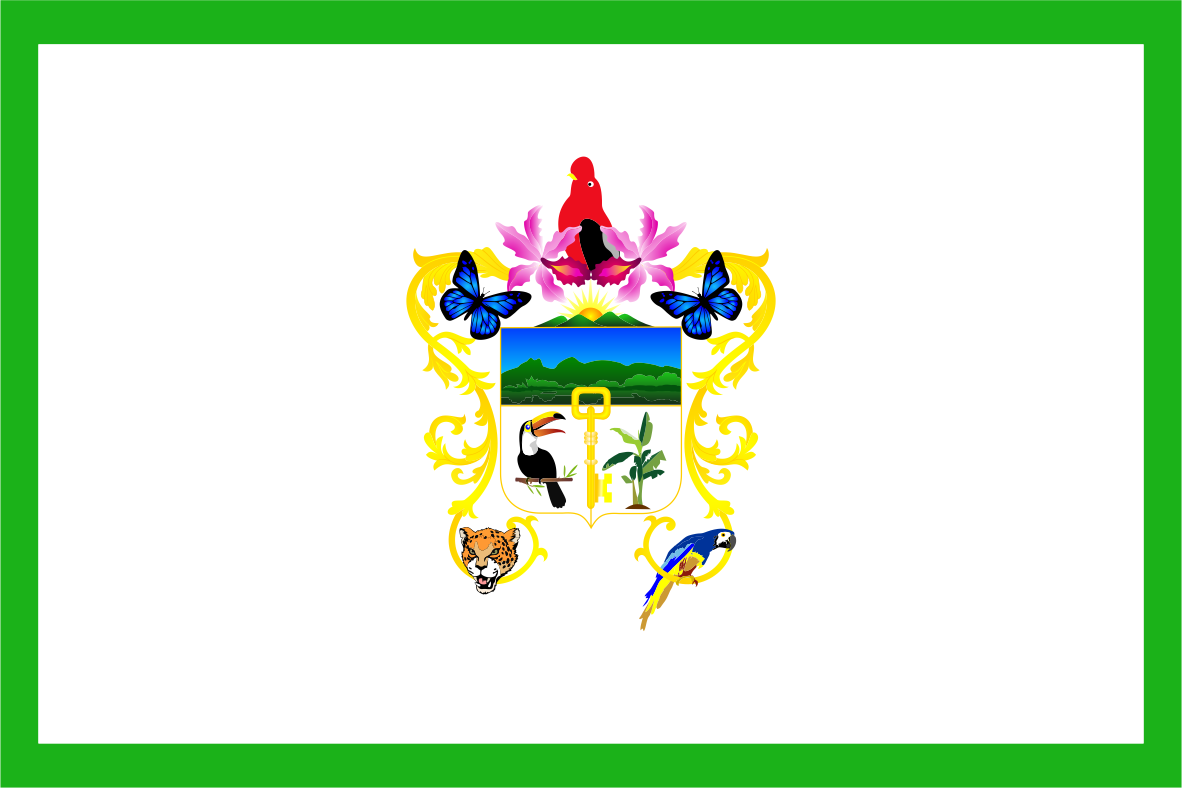
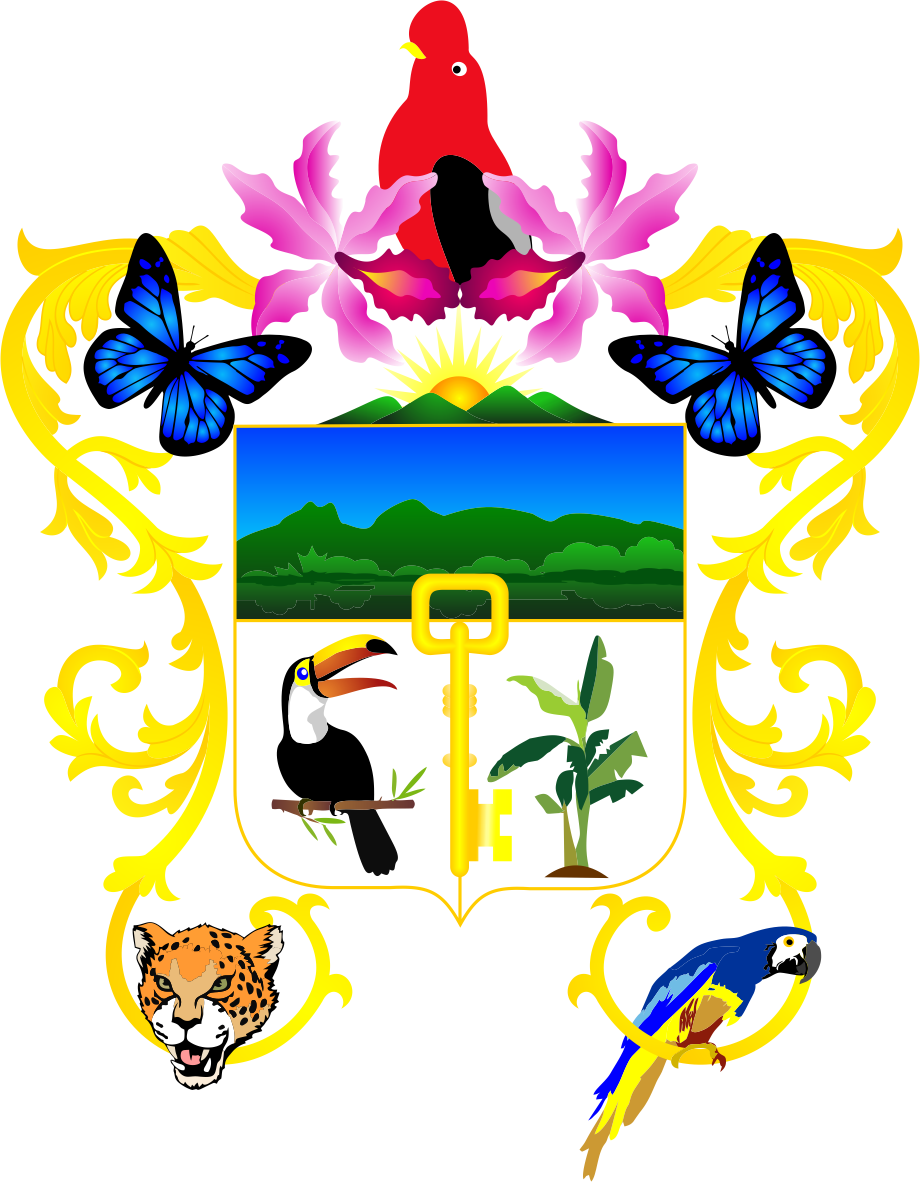
- Flag Coat of arms
- Nickname: The sleeping beauty
- Motto: The door to the Amazonia
- Anthem: Himno Oficial de Tingo María
- Location within Peru
- Coordinates: 9°17′43″S 75°59′51″W
- Country: Peru
- Region: Huánuco
- Province: Leoncio Prado
- District: Rupa-Rupa
- Founded: October 15, 1938

Government
  - Mayor: Miguel Angel Meza Malpartida

Area
  - Total: 4,395.46 km^{2} (1,697.10 sq mi)
- Elevation: 647 m (2,123 ft)

Population (2017)
  - Total: 46,191
  - Density: 10.509/km^{2} (27.218/sq mi)
- Time zone: UTC-5 (PET)
- Postal code: 10131
- Area code: +51+62
- Website: http://www.munitingomaria.gob.pe

Tingo María is the capital of Leoncio Prado Province in the Huánuco Region in central Peru. It has a population of 46,191 inhabitants (2017 census).

Tingo María was considered unreachable until 1936, when the Montaña Road reached the settlement. It was then that the state run Estacion Experimental Agricola was established due to its "comfortable" elevation (2,204 ft). In 1942, the U.S. Government began adding more funding to the station, and by 1960 over 40,000 acres (160 km^{2}) of land were under cultivation, especially along the Huallaga River valley where land was level. Coffee was a particularly valuable crop. The city nickname is "the Door of the Amazonia."

The city is placed where two important rivers meet; the Monzón and the Huallaga river, a main contributor of the Marañón river. The city headquarters the National University of the Forest (UNAS-www.unas.edu.pe); it has 7 faculties, a botanical park, and first level facilities. Near the city there is the Tingo María National Park of 180 km^{2} (43,000 acres (170 km^{2})) that preserves nature and a limestone mountain range in the shape of a woman that sleeps. It is called La Bella Durmiente (Spanish for Sleeping Beauty) or Pumarinri (Quechua for "cougar ear"). A legend explains the form of the range. The main attraction is a cave named Cueva de las Lechuzas (Spanish for "cave of the owls") (named after a colony of the superficially owl-like Oilbird found in it), probably the most attractive and accessible cave of Peru, though it is not the longest and deepest.

Tingo María has an airport served daily by regional jets and turbo-prop airplanes. A well-paved main road, now called "the Federico Basadre" Highway crosses the city halfway from Lima to Pucallpa; 16 km going to the east it meets the Marginal Highway that follows the river to the north and arrives at Tarapoto. A main road that comes from Casma port, on the coast of Ancash department, is being worked now. This road reinforces the position of Tingo María as a regional and national hub.

Tingo María is where actor Eric Fleming, star of American TV show Rawhide with Clint Eastwood, died on September 28, 1966, while shooting a TV movie titled High Jungle. His dugout canoe overturned in the Huallaga River. He was swept away by the current and drowned at age 41.

A relevant industry working on Cacao is the Cooperativa Agroindustrial Naranjillo, that sells its products to foreign markets.

== Climate ==
Tingo María has a tropical rainforest climate (Köppen: Af) with abundant rainfall. The period from November to March is particularly rainy.

Climate data for Tingo María, Rupa-Rupa, elevation 657 m (2,156 ft), (1991–2020)
Month	Jan	Feb	Mar	Apr	May	Jun	Jul	Aug	Sep	Oct	Nov	Dec	Year
Mean daily maximum °C (°F)	29.4 (84.9)	29.0 (84.2)	29.3 (84.7)	30.0 (86.0)	30.0 (86.0)	29.5 (85.1)	29.5 (85.1)	30.2 (86.4)	30.7 (87.3)	30.4 (86.7)	30.1 (86.2)	29.5 (85.1)	29.8 (85.6)
Mean daily minimum °C (°F)	20.6 (69.1)	20.5 (68.9)	20.5 (68.9)	20.6 (69.1)	20.3 (68.5)	19.6 (67.3)	19.0 (66.2)	19.2 (66.6)	19.6 (67.3)	20.2 (68.4)	20.6 (69.1)	20.6 (69.1)	20.1 (68.2)
Average precipitation mm (inches)	420.9 (16.57)	394.4 (15.53)	401.1 (15.79)	262.1 (10.32)	214.9 (8.46)	146.7 (5.78)	125.7 (4.95)	105.4 (4.15)	167.6 (6.60)	273.4 (10.76)	356.8 (14.05)	437.4 (17.22)	3,306.4 (130.18)
Source: National Meteorology and Hydrology Service of Peru
