= Henricus rhiobursa =

Scientific classification
- Kingdom: Animalia
- Phylum: Arthropoda
- Class: Insecta
- Order: Lepidoptera
- Family: Tortricidae
- Genus: Henricus
- Species: H. rhiobursa

Binomial name
- Henricus rhiobursa Razowski, 1991

Species of moth

Henricus rhiobursa is a species of moth of the family Tortricidae. It is found in Nayarit, Mexico.
