= Henricus macrocarpana =

Scientific classification
- Domain: Eukaryota
- Kingdom: Animalia
- Phylum: Arthropoda
- Class: Insecta
- Order: Lepidoptera
- Family: Tortricidae
- Genus: Henricus
- Species: H. macrocarpana

Binomial name
- Henricus macrocarpana (Walsingham, 1895)

Synonyms
- Phtheochroa macrocarpana Walsingham, 1895

Species of moth

Henricus macrocarpana is a species of moth of the family Tortricidae. It is found in the United States, where it has been recorded from Nevada and California.

The wingspan is about 22 mm. Adults have been recorded on wing in January, March, May, June, August and from October to November.
