= Henricus turbula =

Scientific classification
- Domain: Eukaryota
- Kingdom: Animalia
- Phylum: Arthropoda
- Class: Insecta
- Order: Lepidoptera
- Family: Tortricidae
- Genus: Henricus
- Species: H. turbula

Binomial name
- Henricus turbula (Clarke, 1968)

Synonyms
- Irazona turbula Clarke, 1968; Henricus turbulus

Species of moth

Henricus turbula is a species of moth of the family Tortricidae. It is found in Mexico (Tamaulipas, Chiapas) and Guatemala.
