= Henricus bibelonus =

Scientific classification
- Kingdom: Animalia
- Phylum: Arthropoda
- Clade: Pancrustacea
- Class: Insecta
- Order: Lepidoptera
- Family: Tortricidae
- Genus: Henricus
- Species: H. bibelonus

Binomial name
- Henricus bibelonus Razowski & Becker, 2007

Species of moth

Henricus bibelonus is a species of moth in the family Tortricidae. It is found in Carchi Province, Ecuador.

The wingspan is about 15 mm.
