= Henricus generosus =

Scientific classification
- Kingdom: Animalia
- Phylum: Arthropoda
- Class: Insecta
- Order: Lepidoptera
- Family: Tortricidae
- Genus: Henricus
- Species: H. generosus

Binomial name
- Henricus generosus Razowski, 1994

Species of moth

Henricus generosus is a species of moth of the family Tortricidae. It is found in Ecuador (Carchi Province, Napo Province).
