= Henricus ellampus =

Scientific classification
- Kingdom: Animalia
- Phylum: Arthropoda
- Class: Insecta
- Order: Lepidoptera
- Family: Tortricidae
- Genus: Henricus
- Species: H. ellampus

Binomial name
- Henricus ellampus Razowski, 1992

Species of moth

Henricus ellampus is a species of moth of the family Tortricidae. It is found in Costa Rica.

The wingspan is about 19 mm.
