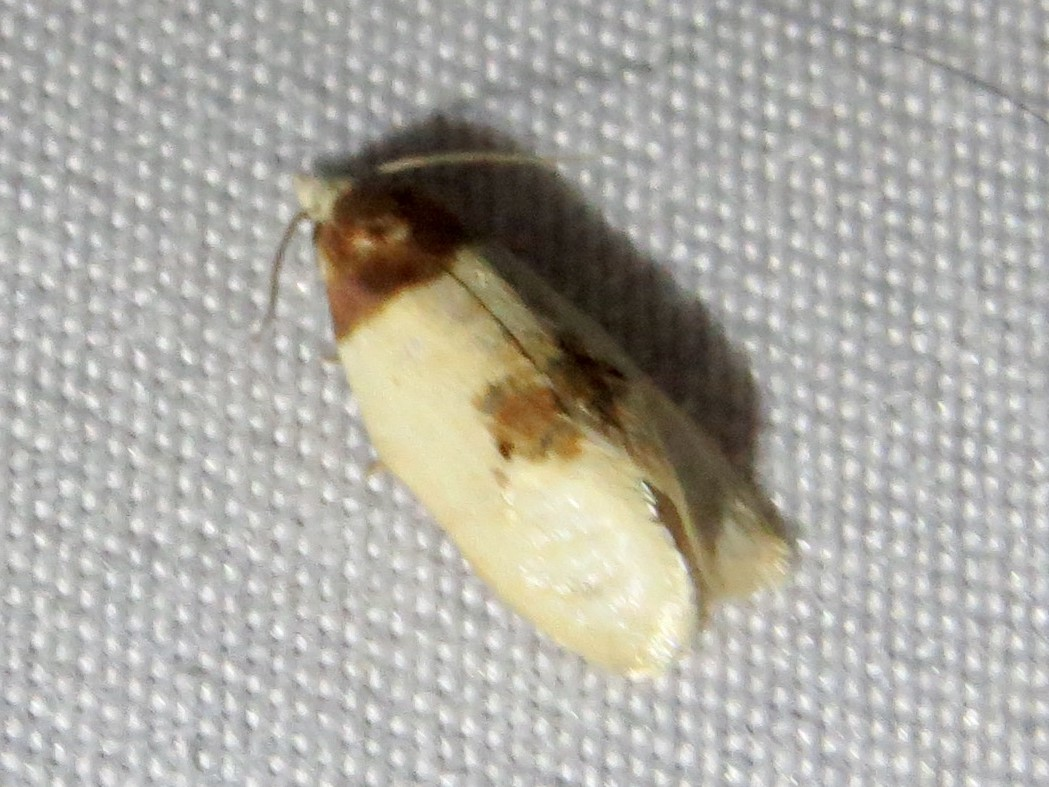

Scientific classification
- Domain: Eukaryota
- Kingdom: Animalia
- Phylum: Arthropoda
- Class: Insecta
- Order: Lepidoptera
- Family: Tortricidae
- Genus: Henricus
- Species: H. cognata

Binomial name
- Henricus cognata (Walsingham, 1914)

Synonyms
- Propira cognata Walsingham, 1914

= Henricus cognata =

Species of moth

Henricus cognata is a species of moth of the family Tortricidae. It is found in Mexico (Veracruz) and the southern United States.
