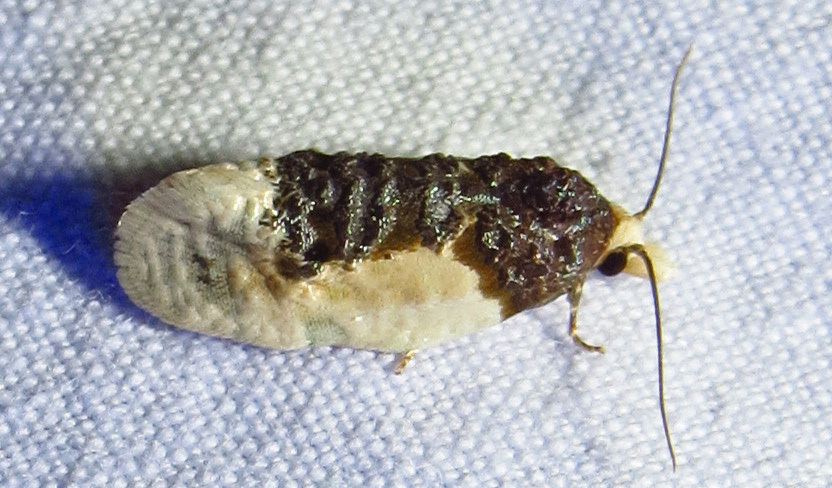

Scientific classification
- Domain: Eukaryota
- Kingdom: Animalia
- Phylum: Arthropoda
- Class: Insecta
- Order: Lepidoptera
- Family: Tortricidae
- Genus: Henricus
- Species: H. edwardsiana

Binomial name
- Henricus edwardsiana (Walsingham, 1884)

Synonyms
- Conchylis edwardsiana Walsingham, 1884

= Henricus edwardsiana =

Species of moth

Henricus edwardsiana is a species of moth of the family Tortricidae. It is found in the United States in Arizona and California.
