= Rupa-Rupa District =

Coordinates: 9.2960°S 75.9991°W

Rupa-Rupa Rupa Rupa
- District
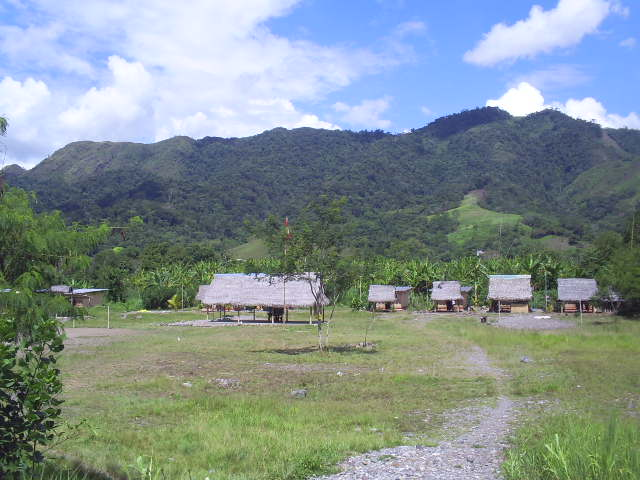
- Bena Jema, a village inhabited by Shipibo-Conibo people
- Interactive map of Rupa-Rupa
- Country: Peru
- Region: Huánuco
- Province: Leoncio Prado
- Founded: April 9, 1946
- Capital: Tingo María

Government
  - Mayor: Juan Orfilio Picon Quedo

Area
  - Total: 428.58 km^{2} (165.48 sq mi)
- Elevation: 649 m (2,129 ft)

Population (2005 census)
  - Total: 52,463
  - Density: 122.41/km^{2} (317.04/sq mi)
- Time zone: UTC-5 (PET)
- UBIGEO: 100601

Rupa-Rupa District is one of six districts of the province Leoncio Prado in Peru.

== Climate ==
Climate data for Tingo María, Rupa-Rupa, elevation 657 m (2,156 ft), (1991–2020)
Month	Jan	Feb	Mar	Apr	May	Jun	Jul	Aug	Sep	Oct	Nov	Dec	Year
Mean daily maximum °C (°F)	29.4 (84.9)	29.0 (84.2)	29.3 (84.7)	30.0 (86.0)	30.0 (86.0)	29.5 (85.1)	29.5 (85.1)	30.2 (86.4)	30.7 (87.3)	30.4 (86.7)	30.1 (86.2)	29.5 (85.1)	29.8 (85.6)
Mean daily minimum °C (°F)	20.6 (69.1)	20.5 (68.9)	20.5 (68.9)	20.6 (69.1)	20.3 (68.5)	19.6 (67.3)	19.0 (66.2)	19.2 (66.6)	19.6 (67.3)	20.2 (68.4)	20.6 (69.1)	20.6 (69.1)	20.1 (68.2)
Average precipitation mm (inches)	420.9 (16.57)	394.4 (15.53)	401.1 (15.79)	262.1 (10.32)	214.9 (8.46)	146.7 (5.78)	125.7 (4.95)	105.4 (4.15)	167.6 (6.60)	273.4 (10.76)	356.8 (14.05)	437.4 (17.22)	3,306.4 (130.18)
Source: National Meteorology and Hydrology Service of Peru
