= Mariano Dámaso Beraun District =

Coordinates: 9.3490°S 75.9809°W

Mariano Dámaso Beraun
- District
- Interactive map of Mariano Dámaso Beraun
- Country: Peru
- Region: Huánuco
- Province: Leoncio Prado
- Founded: May 27, 1952
- Capital: las Palmas

Government
  - Mayor: Freddy Hugo Fernandez Echevarria

Area
  - Total: 766.27 km^{2} (295.86 sq mi)
- Elevation: 719 m (2,359 ft)

Population (2005 census)
  - Total: 9,741
  - Density: 12.71/km^{2} (32.92/sq mi)
- Time zone: UTC-5 (PET)
- UBIGEO: 100606

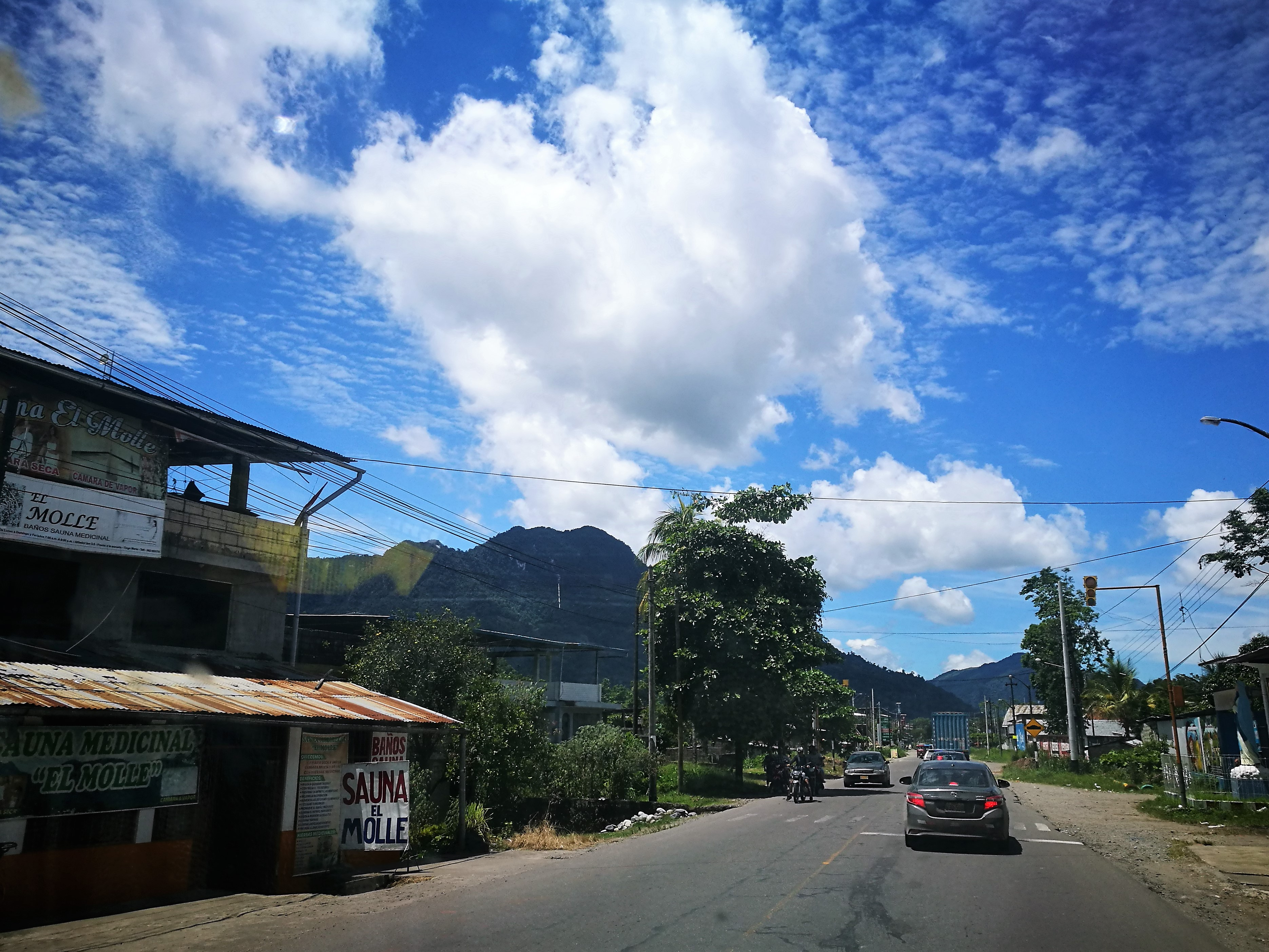
View of La Bella Durmiente

Mariano Dámaso Beraun District is one of six districts of the province Leoncio Prado in Peru.

== See also ==
- Pumarinri
