= Dendropsophus leali =

Conservation status
- Least Concern (IUCN 3.1)

Scientific classification
- Kingdom: Animalia
- Phylum: Chordata
- Class: Amphibia
- Order: Anura
- Family: Hylidae
- Genus: Dendropsophus
- Species: D. leali

Binomial name
- Dendropsophus leali (Bokermann, 1964)

Species of frog

Dendropsophus leali is a species of frog in the family Hylidae. It is found in Bolivia, Brazil, Peru, and possibly Colombia. Its natural habitats are subtropical or tropical moist lowland forests, subtropical or tropical swamps, intermittent freshwater marshes, rural gardens, and heavily degraded former forest. At last assessment, Dendropsophus leali's population trend was considered stable, i.e., its population is neither increasing or decreasing significantly in the wild.
