= La Bella Durmiente, Peru =

Mountain in Peru

La Bella Durmiente
- Puma Ringri
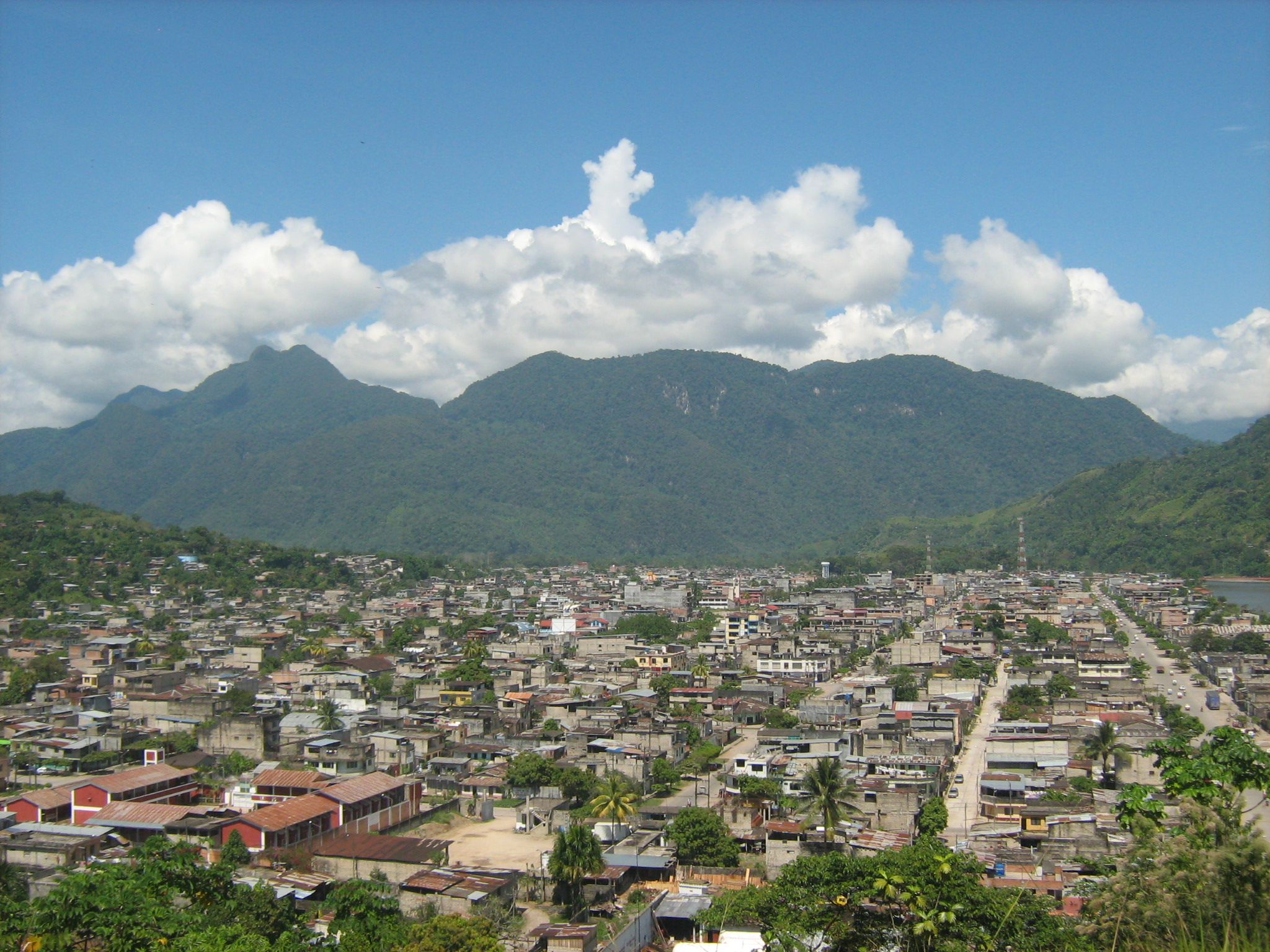
- La Bella Durmiente as seen from Tingo María

Highest point
- Elevation: 1,805 m (5,922 ft)
- Coordinates: 9°18′46″S 76°00′59″W

Geography
- Location within Peru
- Location: Leoncio Prado Province, Huánuco Region, Peru

La Bella Durmiente (Spanish for Sleeping Beauty), also known as Puma Ringri (possibly from Quechua puma cougar, puma, rinri ear, "puma ear"), is a mountain and prominent feature of Tingo María National Park, in the region of Huánuco, Peru. It is located in the district of Mariano Damaso, Leoncio Prado Province, Huánuco and reaches an elevation of 1,805 metres (5,922 ft).

== Name ==
The name comes from the shape of the mountain, which resembles a woman lying down, and is present in a local folktale.
