= BIOPAT – Patrons for Biodiversity =

Fund-raising organisation for the study of biodiversity

- Founded: December 1999
- Founder: Claus Bätke, Frank Glaw, Jörn Köhler
- Type: Voluntary association
- Purpose: Environmentalism
- Website: www.biopat.de

BIOPAT is non-profit-making association set up to raise funds, through donation, for use in studying biodiversity, systematically describing it, and supporting its preservation.

== History ==
BIOPAT was founded in 1999 by an international group of scientists and institutions and sponsored by the Deutsche Gesellschaft für Internationale Zusammenarbeit (GIZ). The concept was initially proposed by Dr. Frank Glaw and Dr. Jörn Köhler in 1998 based on an idea of Professor Gerhard Haszprunar of the State Zoological Collection in Munich. Recognizing the importance of additional funding for taxonomic research to ensure the protection of biodiversity despite declining public support, they proposed a model whereby benefactors would provide funds for taxonomic research and nature conservation in exchange for a new species being named after them.

Similar models have since been adopted by other international environmental and biodiversity organizations, including the Wildlife Conservation Society, the Audubon Society, and Purdue University. It has also been the subject of a paper by the United Nations Environmental Programme

== Funding and accountability ==
The majority of BIOPAT’s income comes from benefactors who provide funds in exchange for a species being named after them by scientists. 50% of this money goes to support taxonomy and biodiversity research, the other half is used in support of nature conservation projects. All members of the Association, including the Scientific Advisory Council, provide their services on a volunteer basis and are not compensated.

To date, over 120 species have been sponsored by BIOPAT.

BIOPAT adheres to the International Non-Governmental Organisations (INGO) Commitment to Accountability Charter.

== Image gallery ==
Examples of species named through the BIOPAT initiative:

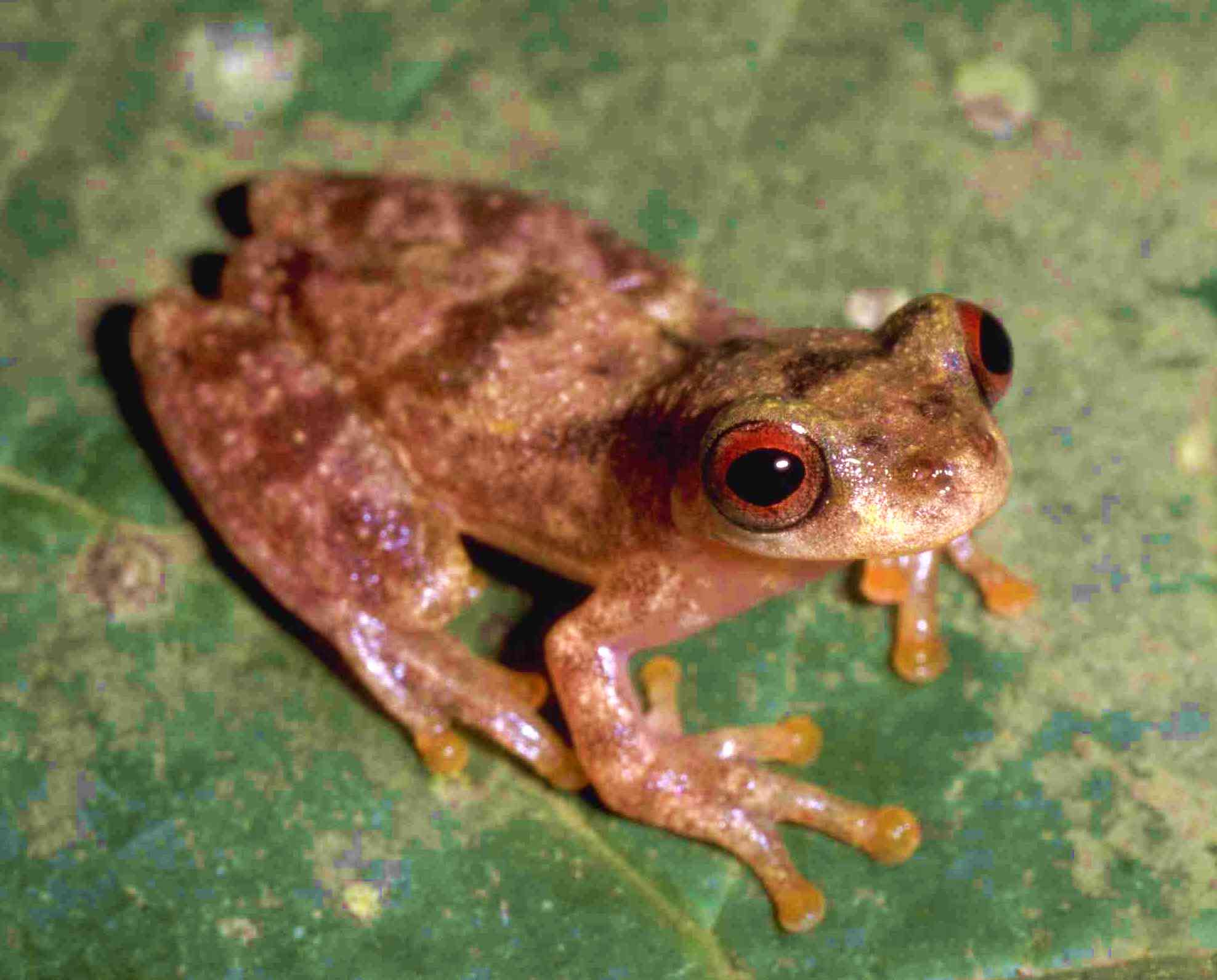
Dendropsophus joannae
