= Hermilio Valdizán =

Peruvian physician

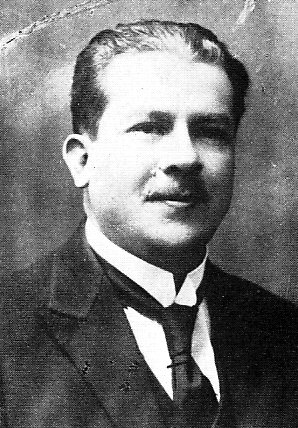
Hermilio Valdizán

Hermilio Valdizán (November 20, 1885 – December 25, 1929) was a Peruvian physician who specialized in psychiatry. He founded the Peruvian Society of Psychiatry in 1923 and was its first president.

== Works written ==
- Crime in Peru (1909)
- Sexual perversions in the early Peruvians (1911)
- Medical problems of marriage (1912)
- Psychiatry in Peru (1912)
- A Psichiatra of secolo XVI (1913)
- The art of the barber (1913)
- Martin de Porres surgeon (1913)
- From the past... (1914)
- Locos of the colony (1919)
- Peruvian[folk medicine (1922, in three volumes, in collaboration with Angel Maldonado).
- Sick Story (1923), narrative work.
- A collection of the works of Dr. Jose Casimiro Ulloa, in two volumes (1924-1925).
- Peruvian Medical Dictionary in six volumes, the first volume being published in 1923. The second volume appeared in 1938, and the rest of the work was published in installments in the Annals of the Faculty of Medicine since 1957. It is a work that brings abundant biographical information, literature, etymology, and medical folk.
- Italian Doctors in Peru (1924)
- History of the Faculty of Medicine of Lima 1811-1911 (1925, in three volumes).
- children Nelida Bardinet (1924)
- Dr. Hipólito Unanue (1926).
- Notes for Peruvian medical literature (1928)
- Reforming medical studies (1928)
- Medical Chronicles (1929)
- You, you're father (1934)
- History of Peruvian medicine (posthumous, 1944).
