= Magnuviator =

Magnuviator Temporal range: Campanian, 75.5 Ma

Scientific classification
- Kingdom: Animalia
- Phylum: Chordata
- Class: Reptilia
- Order: Squamata
- Clade: Iguanomorpha
- Genus: †Magnuviator; DeMar et al., 2017

Type species
- Magnuviator ovimonsensis DeMar et al., 2017

Extinct genus of lizards

Magnuviator is a genus of extinct iguanomorph lizard from the Late Cretaceous of Montana, US. It contains one species, M. ovimonsensis, described in 2017 by DeMar et al. from two specimens that were discovered in the Egg Mountain nesting site. Magnuviator is closest related to the Asian Saichangurvel and Temujinia, which form the group Temujiniidae. Unlike other members of the Iguanomorpha, however, Magnuviator bears a distinct articulating notch on its tibia for the ankle bones (astragalus and calcaneum), which has traditionally been considered a characteristic of non-iguanomorph lizards. The morphology of its teeth suggests that its diet would have mainly consisted of wasps, like the modern phyrnosomatid iguanians Callisaurus and Urosaurus, although it also shows some adaptations to herbivory.

== Description ==
For an iguanomorph, Magnuviator was large, measuring 21.6 centimetres (8.5 in) long without the tail. Both of the known specimens were adults, judging by the extensive fusion of the pelvis (ilium, ischium, and pubis) at the acetabulum.

=== Skull ===
On the skull, the frontal bone is fused completely into a single element, or azygous, with no visible sutures. Viewed from the top, it is hourglass-shaped, with the narrowest point being above the eye socket, and the surface is somewhat roughened. It contacts the prefrontal bone at its front end; the contact is curved, such that the prefrontal wraps around the front of the frontal. The prefrontal itself bears a protrusion of bone. At the back, the frontal contacts the parietal bone; here, there is a very visible and wide suture that is slightly concave relative to the front of the skull, and the opening of the parietal eye is located in the middle of this suture. The back halves of the sides of the frontal bear rounded ridges.

The postorbital bone has three branches, with the front and interior edges of the bone being concave when viewed from the top, while the outer edge was mostly straight. On the postorbital, the interior edge bears a projection around its midpoint, and forms the front margin of the supratemporal fenestra. At the bottom, the postorbital tapers to a rounded point, and articulates with the backward-projecting and overlapping postorbital process of the jugal bone; at the back, it also tapers, and has a narrow groove that would have articulated with the squamosal bone. The distance between these two articulations is rather short, suggesting that most of the bottom of the postorbital would have been hidden in life. The squamosal bone itself bears a branch that stretches towards the top of the skull.

Although it is poorly preserved, the half-moon-shaped postfrontal bone would have extended from a process from the postorbital up to the level of the suture between the frontal and parietal, overlapping the postorbital when viewed from the top. The end that contacted the postorbital appears to be split into two. On the underside of the jaw, the palatine bone uniquely bears an opening near the front end that extends forward into the skull to connect to the infraorbital canal.

=== Mandible and postcrania ===
The jaw of Magnuviator is long and slender, and the Meckelian canal is open. On the jaw, there are 22 to 24 closely spaced columnar teeth. They are pleurodont, meaning that they extend out from the interior side of the jawbone, they are roughly equal in height, and they do not have V-shaped wear facets. At the front of the jaw, the teeth have a single cusp (monocuspid); further back, the teeth gain an additional cusp at the back (bicuspid), then an additional one at the front (tricuspid). The splenial bone uniquely reaches forward to about 2/3 the length of the tooth row. On the splenial, the anterior inferior alveolar foramen is also located partially on the dentary, and is uniquely located behind and above the anterior mylohyoid foramen. Meanwhile, the angular bone bears a process in front of the jaw joint.

On the vertebrae, the zygosphere processes are separate, and located on a distinct foot, or pedicle, of the vertebral arch. In the shoulder girdle, the clavicle is expanded and bears a notch on its interior edge, while the interclavicle bears an expansion on its front end. The scapulocoracoid bears a primary coracoid fenestra, but apparently not a secondary coracoid fenestra. Whether or not it has a scapular fenestra is unclear. On the pubis, the symphysis was rather thin. Unlike all other iguanomorphs, the tibia bears a special notch for articulation with the astragalum-calcaneum.

== Discovery and naming ==
Both known specimens of Magnuviator are known from the Egg Mountain locality of the Two Medicine Formation, which represents a nesting site. This locality is located in Teton County, Montana, and would have been at 48° N in the Campanian age of the Cretaceous period; more specifically, it has been dated to 75.5 ± 0.4 million years ago. The two specimens are MOR 6627, the holotype, and MOR 7042, both nearly complete skeletons stored at the Museum of the Rockies. They were collected by Dr. David Varricchio, who coauthored a study that described the genus which was published in 2017.

The genus name Magnuviator combines the Latin words magnus ("mighty") and viātor ("traveller"), in reference to its large size and close affinities to the Asian Temujiniidae. Meanwhile, the specific name ovimonsensis, from Latin ovi- ("egg"), mons ("mountain"), and -ēnsis ("from"), refers directly to the Egg Mountain locality.

== Classification ==
In 2017, Magnuviator was found to be an iguanomorph, most closely related to the Asian Temujiniidae (which contains Saichangurvel and Temujinia). Three characteristics allow Magnuviator to be recognized as a member of the Iguanomorpha: the parietal eye being located at the frontal-parietal suture; the boss on the prefrontal; and the angular process in front of the jaw joint. Like the Temujiniidae, the splenial anterior inferior alveolar foramen is shared between the splenial and the dentary in Magnuviator, and it also has a thin pubic symphysis.

However, unlike the Temujiniidae but like most other iguanomorphs, Magnuviator also has an upwards-directed process of the squamosal. It also differs from the Pleurodonta in that the Meckelian canal is open; and from the Chamaeleontiformes, containing the Acrodonta, in its lack of enlarged, fang-like teeth, the lack of V-shaped wear facets on the teeth, and its possession of more teeth in general. Its presence of an astralago-calcaneal notch is only otherwise seen in non-iguanians.

The following phylogenetic tree illustrates the position of Magnuviator among iguanomorphs.

- Iguanomorpha
  - Chamaeleontiformes
    - - Acrodonta
      - Priscagamidae
    - Ctenomastax parva
  - - Magnuviator ovimonsensis
    - Temujiniidae
      - Saichangurvel davidsoni
      - Temujinia ellisoni
  - - - - Isodontosaurus gracilis
        - Polrussia mongoliensis
      - Zapsosaurus sceliphros
    - Pleurodonta

As the oldest known North American iguanomorph, Magnuviator helps to complete the picture of the emergence of the Pleurodonta, a clade only definitely known from the Eocene forward due to scarcity of fossil remains in the southern parts of North America. Molecular phylogenies have predicted that Pleurodonta originated in the Late Cretaceous. The location, temporal context, and phylogenetic placement of Magnuviator indicates at both Magnuviator itself, as well as the Pleurodonta, are part of a low-latitude evolutionary radiation of iguanomorphs across the continent of Laurasia in response to warm, tropical climates. This radiation may have occurred even earlier, possibly within the Early Cretaceous.

== Paleobiology ==
=== Diet ===
Both insectivorous and herbivorous iguanians have teeth with multiple cusps, but herbivorous iguanians tend to have wider, flatter, blade-like teeth. Magnuviator has a mixture of different tooth morphologies, from the herbivory-adapted teeth described above to the blunt, peg-like teeth like the insectivorous Phrynosoma (horned lizard). Overall, the slender, cylindrical teeth of Magnuviator best recall the phyrnosomatids Callisaurus (zebra-tailed lizard) and Urosaurus (tree lizard), some species of which feed mostly on bees and wasps. Given that hymenopteran pupal cases, probably attributable to wasps, are known from the Egg Mountain locality, it is plausible that Magnuviator would have fed on these wasps. It would, however, have also been energetically capable of digesting plants, given its large size.

== Paleoecology ==
The Egg Mountain locality, which Magnuviator inhabited, represented a seasonally semi-arid upland floodplain. Fossils known from the locality exclusively represent terrestrial animals; dinosaurs found at Egg Mountain include the ornithopod Orodromeus makelai and small specimens of the paravian Troodon sp., and the mammals Alphadon halleyi and Cimexomys judithae are also known from the locality. Also from Egg Mountain are unnamed varanoid lizards, as well as various non-body fossils, including wasp pupal cases, nests, and dinosaurian coprolites. Overall, the environment of the Egg Mountain locality more closely parallels that of the Mongolian Djadochta Formation (from where temujiniids and other basal iguanomorphs are known), than that of its contemporary non-iguanomorph squamates in North America (largely preserved in lowland systems of freshwater rivers).
