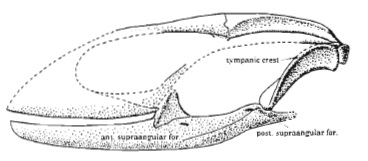

Scientific classification
- Domain: Eukaryota
- Kingdom: Animalia
- Phylum: Chordata
- Class: Reptilia
- Order: Squamata
- Suborder: Iguania
- Clade: †Gobiguania
- Genus: †Igua; Borsuk-Białynicka and Alifanov, 1991

Type species
- †Igua minuta Borsuk-Białynicka and Alifanov, 1991

= Igua =

Igua Temporal range: Late Cretaceous

Extinct genus of lizards

Igua is an extinct genus of iguanian lizards belonging to a group called Gobiguania that was endemic to the Gobi Desert during the Late Cretaceous. The type species Igua minuta was named in 1991 on the basis of a skull from the Barun Goyot Formation in Mongolia. The skull itself is very small, only 14 millimetres (0.55 in) long, and may have belonged to a juvenile given that it possesses a large fontanelle and that many of the bones are unfused. The snout-vent length of the individual (the total body length minus the tail) is estimated to have been 55 to 65 millimetres (2.2 to 2.6 in). Igua differs from related gobiguanians like Polrussia in having a more rounded skull. It is similar in appearance to the living genera Liolaemus and Tropidurus. The teeth are tricuspid and pleurodont, meaning they are attached to inner surfaces of the jaws.

Below is a cladogram from Daza et al. (2012) showing the phylogenetic relationships of Igua:

- Iguania
  - †Hoyalacerta sanzi
  - - - †Huehuecuetzpalli mixtecus
      - †Pristiguana brasiliensis
    - - Chamaeleontiformes
        - †Priscagamidae
        - Acrodonta
      - Iguanoidea (=Pleurodonta)
        - - Silvaiguana
            - Hoplocercidae
            - Polychrotidae
          - †Gobiguania
            - †Polrussia mongoliensis
            - †Igua minuta
            - †Isodontosaurus gracilis
            - - †Anchaurosaurus gilmorei
              - †Zapsosaurus sceliphros
            - - †Saichangurvel davidsoni
              - - †Temujinia ellisoni
                - †Ctenomastax parva
        - Euiguana
          - Corytophanidae
          - Terraiguana
          - - - Iguanidae
              - Crotaphytidae
            - - Phrynosomatidae
              - - Opluridae
                - - †Uquiasaurus
                  - - Liolaemidae
                    - - Leiocephalus
                      - Tropiduridae
