= Anchaurosaurus =

Anchaurosaurus Temporal range: Late Cretaceous

Scientific classification
- Kingdom: Animalia
- Phylum: Chordata
- Class: Reptilia
- Order: Squamata
- Suborder: Iguania
- Clade: †Gobiguania
- Genus: †Anchaurosaurus; Gao and Hou, 1995

Type species
- †Anchaurosaurus gilmorei Gao and Hou, 1995

Extinct genus of lizards

Anchaurosaurus (meaning "morning lizard" in Latin) is an extinct genus of iguanian lizard from the Late Cretaceous of Inner Mongolia, China. It belongs to an extinct clade of iguanians called Gobiguania that was endemic to the Gobi Desert during the Late Cretaceous. The type species, Anchaurosaurus gilmorei, was named in 1995 on the basis of a well-preserved skull and incomplete skeleton from the Djadochta Formation. Compared to other iguanians, Anchaurosaurus has a relatively elongated skull, large eye sockets, and higher tooth crowns. Phylogenetic analysis indicates that among gobiguanians, Anchaurosaurus is most closely related to Zapsosaurus from Mongolia. Below is a cladogram from Daza et al. (2012) showing the phylogenetic relationships of Anchaurosaurus:

- Iguania
  - †Hoyalacerta sanzi
  - - - †Huehuecuetzpalli mixtecus
      - †Pristiguana brasiliensis
    - - Chamaeleontiformes
        - †Priscagamidae
        - Acrodonta
      - Iguanoidea (=Pleurodonta)
        - - Silvaiguana
            - Hoplocercidae
            - Polychrotidae
          - †Gobiguania
            - †Polrussia mongoliensis
            - †Igua minuta
            - †Isodontosaurus gracilis
            - - †Anchaurosaurus gilmorei
              - †Zapsosaurus sceliphros
            - - †Saichangurvel davidsoni
              - - †Temujinia ellisoni
                - †Ctenomastax parva
        - Euiguana
          - Corytophanidae
          - Terraiguana
          - - - Iguanidae
              - Crotaphytidae
            - - Phrynosomatidae
              - - Opluridae
                - - †Uquiasaurus
                  - - Liolaemidae
                    - - Leiocephalus
                      - Tropiduridae
