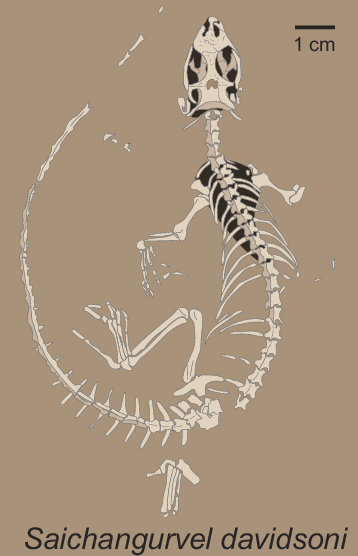
- Line drawing of type specimen

Scientific classification
- Kingdom: Animalia
- Phylum: Chordata
- Class: Reptilia
- Order: Squamata
- Suborder: Iguania
- Clade: †Gobiguania
- Genus: †Saichangurvel; Conrad and Norell, 2007

Type species
- †Saichangurvel davidsoni Conrad and Norell, 2007

= Saichangurvel =

Saichangurvel Temporal range: Late Cretaceous

Extinct genus of lizards

Saichangurvel (meaning "beautiful lizard" in Mongolian) is an extinct genus of iguanian lizards from the Late Cretaceous of Mongolia. It is a member of a clade called Gobiguania, an exclusively Late Cretaceous group of iguanian lizards that was likely endemic to the Gobi Desert. The type species, Saichangurvel davidsoni, was named by paleontologists Jack Conrad and Mark Norell of the American Museum of Natural History in 2007. It is known from a single nearly complete and fully articulated skeleton called IGM 3/858, which was found eroding from a block of sandstone during a thunderstorm at a fossil locality called Ukhaa Tolgod. IGM 3/858 comes from the Djadochta Formation, which is between 75 and 71 million years in age. Just as it is today, the Gobi was a desert during the Cretaceous. IGM 3/858 may have died in a collapsing sand dune, the rapid burial preserving its skeleton in pristine condition.

Saichangurvel has a lightly built skull with a short snout and large eye sockets. It differs from other gobiguanians such as Ctenomastax and Temujinia in that it has a large uncalcified region (a fontanelle) around an opening in its skull roof called the pineal foramen. It also lacks the large caniniform teeth seen in some other gobiguanians. Below is a cladogram from Daza et al. (2012) showing its phylogenetic relationships with other gobiguanians:

- Iguania
  - †Hoyalacerta sanzi
  - - - †Huehuecuetzpalli mixtecus
      - †Pristiguana brasiliensis
    - - Chamaeleontiformes
        - †Priscagamidae
        - Acrodonta
      - Iguanoidea (=Pleurodonta)
        - - Silvaiguana
            - Hoplocercidae
            - Polychrotidae
          - †Gobiguania
            - †Polrussia mongoliensis
            - †Igua minuta
            - †Isodontosaurus gracilis
            - - †Anchaurosaurus gilmorei
              - †Zapsosaurus sceliphros
            - - †Saichangurvel davidsoni
              - - †Temujinia ellisoni
                - †Ctenomastax parva
        - Euiguana
          - Corytophanidae
          - Terraiguana
          - - - Iguanidae
              - Crotaphytidae
            - - Phrynosomatidae
              - - Opluridae
                - - †Uquiasaurus
                  - - Liolaemidae
                    - - Leiocephalus
                      - Tropiduridae
