= Polrussia =

Polrussia Temporal range: Late Cretaceous

Scientific classification
- Domain: Eukaryota
- Kingdom: Animalia
- Phylum: Chordata
- Class: Reptilia
- Order: Squamata
- Suborder: Iguania
- Clade: †Gobiguania
- Genus: †Polrussia; Borsuk-Białynicka and Alifanov, 1991

Type species
- †Polrussia mongoliensis Borsuk-Białynicka and Alifanov, 1991

Extinct genus of lizards

Polrussia is an extinct genus of iguanian lizards dating to the Late Cretaceous epoch, found in what is now Mongolia. It belongs to a group of extinct iguanians called Gobiguania that was endemic to the Gobi Desert during the Late Cretaceous. The type species Polrussia mongoliensis was named in 1991 on the basis of a skull found in the Barun Goyot Formation. The genus name refers to the Polish and Russian paleontologists who worked together to find and describe the material. Polrussia has a short skull, slightly pointed and flattened snout, and large eye sockets. The teeth each have one cusp, as opposed to the multiple cusps seen in some other gobiguanians. The skull is only 1.2 centimetres (0.47 in) long, making Polrussia one of the smallest gobiguanians.

Below is a cladogram from Daza et al. (2012) showing the phylogenetic relationships of Polrussia:

- Iguania
  - †Hoyalacerta sanzi
  - - - †Huehuecuetzpalli mixtecus
      - †Pristiguana brasiliensis
    - - Chamaeleontiformes
        - †Priscagamidae
        - Acrodonta
      - Iguanoidea (=Pleurodonta)
        - - Silvaiguana
            - Hoplocercidae
            - Polychrotidae
          - †Gobiguania
            - †Polrussia mongoliensis
            - †Igua minuta
            - †Isodontosaurus gracilis
            - - †Anchaurosaurus gilmorei
              - †Zapsosaurus sceliphros
            - - †Saichangurvel davidsoni
              - - †Temujinia ellisoni
                - †Ctenomastax parva
        - Euiguana
          - Corytophanidae
          - Terraiguana
          - - - Iguanidae
              - Crotaphytidae
            - - Phrynosomatidae
              - - Opluridae
                - - †Uquiasaurus
                  - - Liolaemidae
                    - - Leiocephalus
                      - Tropiduridae
