= Xihaina =

Xihaina Temporal range: Late Cretaceous

Scientific classification
- Domain: Eukaryota
- Kingdom: Animalia
- Phylum: Chordata
- Class: Reptilia
- Order: Squamata
- Suborder: Iguania
- Clade: Pleurodonta
- Genus: †Xihaina; Gao and Hou, 1995

Type species
- †Xihaina aquilonia Gao and Hou, 1995

Extinct genus of lizards

Xihaina is an extinct genus of iguanian lizard from the Late Cretaceous of Inner Mongolia, China. The type species Xihaina aquilonia was named in 1995 from the Djadochta Formation and is known from a partial skeleton that preserves parts of the skull, most of the vertebral column, the pelvis, and the right hind limb. The incomplete nature of this specimen makes the classification of Xihaina difficult; it has never been incorporated into a phylogenetic analysis, but it shares similarities with a group of Late Cretaceous Mongolian lizards called Gobiguania, particularly the gobiguanian genera Anchaurosaurus and Polrussia. The fact that many skeletal elements are missing yet the rest of the skeleton is articulated suggests the individual may have been partially eaten by a predator or scavenger and then rapidly buried soon after.
