= I. gracilis =

I. gracilis may refer to:

- Ipomoea gracilis, a plant species found in Australia
- Ischnocalanus gracilis, a copepod species in the genus Ischnocalanus
- Isodontosaurus gracilis, a prehistoric lizard species in the genus Isodontosaurus

== See also ==
- Gracilis (disambiguation)
