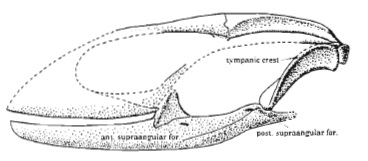
- Igua minuta

Scientific classification
- Domain: Eukaryota
- Kingdom: Animalia
- Phylum: Chordata
- Class: Reptilia
- Order: Squamata
- Suborder: Iguania
- Clade: Pleurodonta
- Clade: †Gobiguania; Conrad and Norell, 2007

Genera
- †Anchaurosaurus †Ctenomastax †Igua †Isodontosaurus †Polrussia †Saichangurvel †Temujinia †Zapsosaurus

= Gobiguania =

Gobiguania Temporal range: Late Cretaceous, 84.9–70.6 Ma

Extinct clade of lizards

Gobiguania is an extinct clade of iguanian lizards from the Late Cretaceous. All known gobiguanians are endemic to the Gobi Desert of Mongolia. Gobiguania was given a phylogenetic definition by Jack Conrad and Mark Norell in 2007 as all taxa more closely related to Anchaurosaurus gilmorei than to Iguana iguana (the green iguana), Crotaphytus collaris (the common collared lizard), or Agama agama (the common agama). According to Conrad and Norell's phylogenetic analysis, Gobiguania includes Anchaurosaurus as well as several other Late Cretaceous lizards such as Ctenomastax, Temujinia, Saichangurvel, and Zapsosaurus. A phylogenetic analysis published in 2012 indicated that three other lizard genera — Igua, Isodontosaurus, and Polrussia, all from Mongolia and all from the Late Cretaceous — are also gobiguanians. Below is a cladogram from the analysis:

- Iguania
  - †Hoyalacerta sanzi
  - - - †Huehuecuetzpalli mixtecus
      - †Pristiguana brasiliensis
    - - Chamaeleontiformes
        - †Priscagamidae
        - Acrodonta
      - Iguanoidea (=Pleurodonta)
        - - Silvaiguana
            - Hoplocercidae
            - Polychrotidae
          - †Gobiguania
            - †Polrussia mongoliensis
            - †Igua minuta
            - †Isodontosaurus gracilis
            - - †Anchaurosaurus gilmorei
              - †Zapsosaurus sceliphros
            - - †Saichangurvel davidsoni
              - - †Temujinia ellisoni
                - †Ctenomastax parva
        - Euiguana
          - Corytophanidae
          - Terraiguana
          - - - Iguanidae
              - Crotaphytidae
            - - Phrynosomatidae
              - - Opluridae
                - - †Uquiasaurus
                  - - Liolaemidae
                    - - Leiocephalus
                      - Tropiduridae
