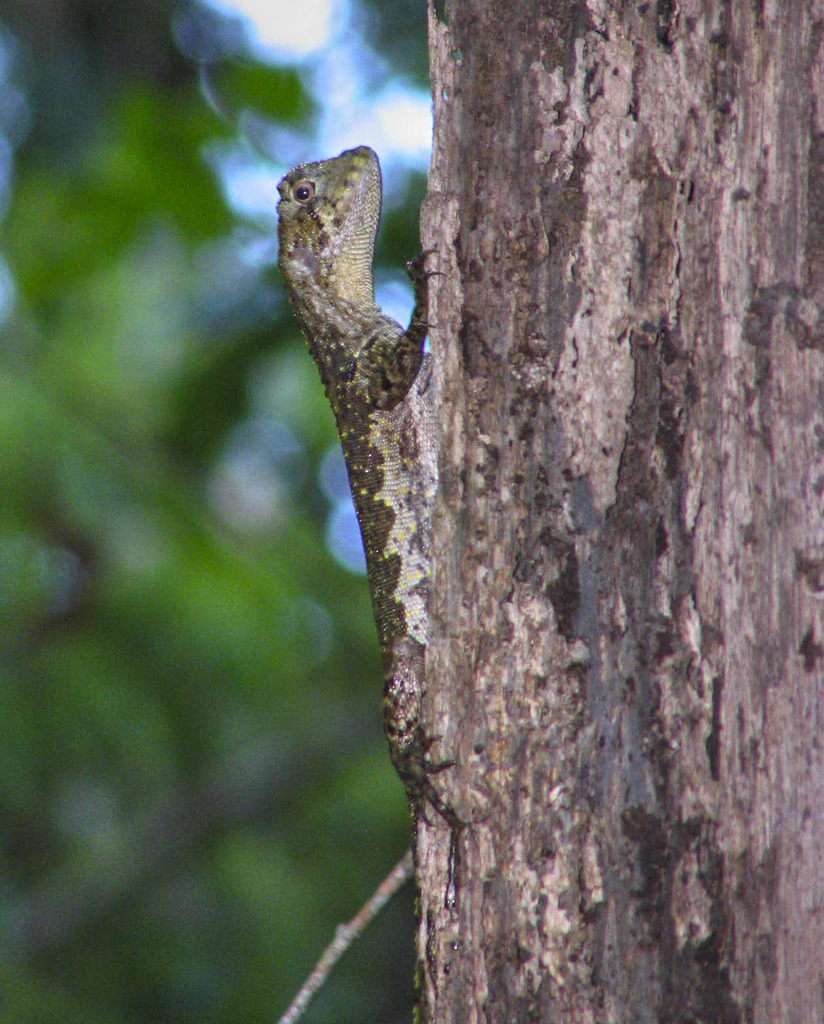

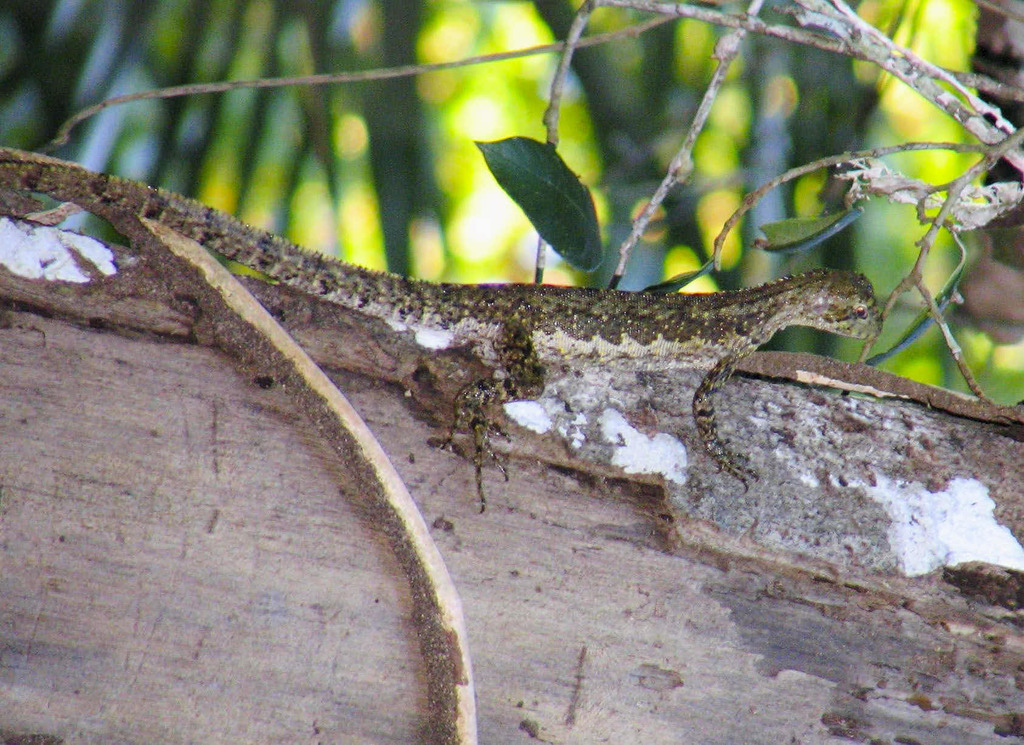

Conservation status
- Least Concern (IUCN 3.1)

Scientific classification
- Kingdom: Animalia
- Phylum: Chordata
- Class: Reptilia
- Order: Squamata
- Suborder: Iguania
- Family: Tropiduridae
- Genus: Uranoscodon; Kaup, 1825
- Species: U. superciliosus

Binomial name
- Uranoscodon superciliosus (Linnaeus, 1758)

Synonyms
- Lacerta superciliosa Linnaeus, 1758; Iguana superciliosa (Linnaeus, 1758); Agama stellaris Daudin, 1802; Agama tigrina Merrem, 1820; Lophyrus xiphosurus Spix, 1825; Lophyrus aureonitens Spix, 1825; Ophryessa superciliosa (Linnaeus, 1758); Ophryessa aureonitens Boie, 1825; Hypsibatus (Ophryoessa) superciliosa (Linnaeus, 1758); Tropidurus superciliosa (Linnaeus, 1758)

= Uranoscodon =

Species of lizard

Uranoscodon is a monotypic genus of iguanomorph lizard belonging to the family Tropiduridae, the Neotropical ground lizards. Its sole member, Uranoscodon superciliosus, is commonly known as the diving lizard, brown tree climber or mophead iguana. It is found near water in the Amazon rainforest of South America.

== Taxonomy ==
Uranoscodon was first described as a genus in 1825 by the German naturalist Johann Jakob Kaup, its only species being Lacerta superciliosa which had been described by Carl Linnaeus in the 10th edition of his Systema Naturae published in 1758. Linnaeus gave the type locality as "Indiis", however, in 1973 this was narrowed down to the confluence of the Cottica River and Perica Creek in Suriname. The genus Uranoscodon is classified within the family Tropiduridae which, in turn, is within the clade Iguanoidea within the infraorder Iguanomorpha, which is also known as Iguania.

== Description ==
Uranoscodon superciliosus has a relatively small head, with a body and tail which show latero-lateral compression but it is not extremely flattened. It has a relatively long tail and legs. The overall colour is brown. There is a frill around the heads of adults which gives rise to the common name mop-headed iguana. The snout-vent length is up to c. 16 cm (6.3 in) with the tail being twice as long; sexual maturity is reached at a snout-vent length of 9–11 cm (3.5–4.3 in).

== Distribution and habitat ==
Uranoscodon superciliosus is found in the Amazonian regions of Brazil, French Guiana, Guyana, Suriname, eastern Venezuela, eastern Colombia, Bolivia and northeastern Peru. However, in Peru it is known only a single locality near to the Colombian/Brazilian border and it has not been recorded in Ecuador. This species occurs in igapó and várzea flood forests and in riparian areas of terre firme forests, i.e. forests not subjected to seasonal flooding.

== Biology ==
Uranoscodon superciliosus spends most of its time on tree trunks and is largely insectivorous. It is an ambush predator which feeds mainly on orthopterans, cockroaches, earthworms and caterpillars, as well small vertebrates like frogs. They seem to eat the largest amount of larvae around the period of peak egg laying in July to November. When threatened these lizards are known to dive into water. They lay up to 16 eggs and are known to nest in burrows or in tree hollows.

== Utilisation ==
Uranoscodon superciliosus is occasionally traded in the pet trade. In Brazil these lizards are hunted illegally to be used in Umbanda ceremonies to treat impotence.
