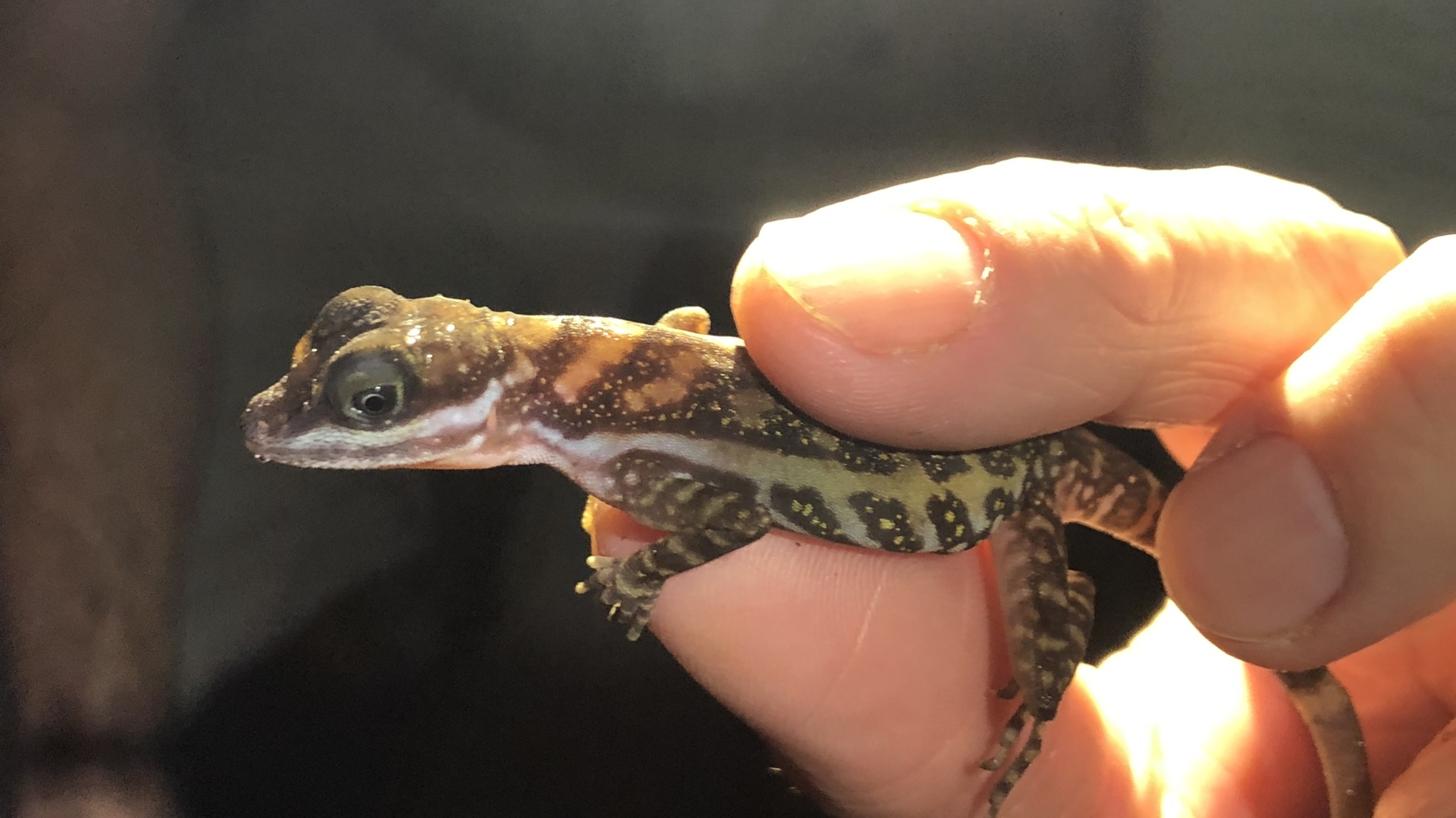

Conservation status
- Least Concern (IUCN 3.1)

Scientific classification
- Kingdom: Animalia
- Phylum: Chordata
- Class: Reptilia
- Order: Squamata
- Suborder: Iguania
- Family: Anolidae
- Genus: Anolis
- Species: A. aquaticus

Binomial name
- Anolis aquaticus Taylor, 1956

= Anolis aquaticus =

Species of reptile

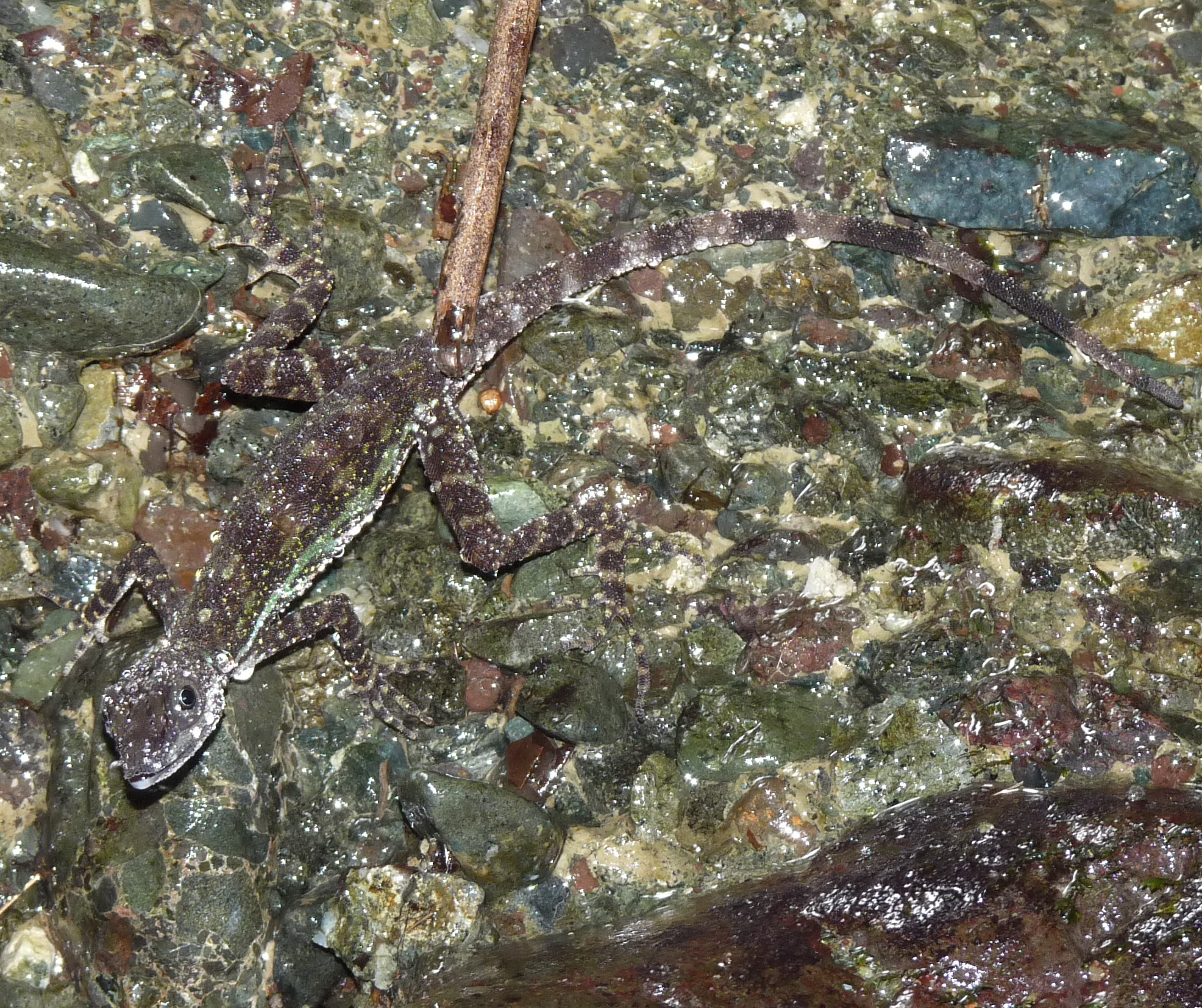
A well-camouflaged aquarit anole

An aquatic anole in Corcovado National Park, Costa Rica

Anolis aquaticus, commonly known as the water anole, is a semi-aquatic species of anole, a lizard in the family Dactyloidae, native to southwestern Costa Rica and far southwestern Panama. The species demonstrates adaptations that allows it to spend periods of time underwater up to approximately a quarter of an hour, forming an air bubble which clings to its head and serves to recycle the animal's air supply while it spends time beneath the surface. Although highly unusual, similar adaptions and behavior are found in other species of semi-aquatic anoles.

== Taxonomy ==
The order of the water anole is Squamata, which refers to scaled reptiles. Squamata is the largest order of reptiles, including species of lizards, snakes, and amphisbaenians. Members of this order are found on every continent other than Antarctica, and they live in a variety of habitats, while showcasing various different traits.

Iguania is a suborder that includes species of chameleons, iguanas, and New World lizards such as the water anole. Most species in the Iguania suborder are arboreal, meaning they travel by tree, but many other notable species are described as being terrestrial. They typically have tongues that are non-prehensile and fleshy, with the exception of chameleons. There are fossil records of members of this suborder dating back to the Early Jurassic period, with the earliest known member being the Bharatagama which lived in modern day India around 190 million years ago.

The water anole is categorized in the group Dactyloidae, which is a family under the suborder Iguania. Dactyloidae refer to lizards that are in locations ranging from Paraguay to the southeastern regions of the United States, and are commonly referred to as anoles.

Anolis refers to a genus of anoles that are native to North and South America. There are currently more than 425 species that are known, and they are under the suborder Iguania and family Dactyloidae. Anolis used to be included in the family Polychrotidae, but recently they have been categorized under the family Dactyloidae.

Despite being under the same genus, different species under Anolis have exhibited many differences, mostly in the context of their habitat and location. They fill up different niches due to the isolation and separation of the species into significantly different habitats, which has led to morphological changes that better fit their habitats. Examples include a difference in limb length based on the diameter of the trees that different species walk on, with thinner trees leading to lizards with shorter limbs, and wider trees leading to lizards with longer limbs. The water anole, in contrast, is terrestrial, and spends most of its time on the ground or climbing rocks and large boulders.

== Physical description ==
The order Squamata are notable for their jaw structure, which provides them flexible jaws and a powerful biting force. Members of this order have developed a movable hinge in their skull called the quadratojugal hinge, and along with increased jaw muscle development, have given these organisms a strong biting force. Squamata are divided into many different suborders, and the water anole is part of the suborder Iguania.

In most species of Dactyloidae, males have a flap of skin that extends from their necks, which is often brightly colored and used for display. Despite being very distantly related, they show many similarities to geckos, such as their anatomy and the ability to break off their tail.

=== Body coloration ===
Being part of the group Dactyloidae, their bodies are most often a green or brown color, but like the water anole, many species are able to change colors. The water anole has the ability to change the color of the stripes that are throughout the length of their bodies. The colors display the level of stress that they are under. It has been determined through experimentation with the lizard species that brighter colored stripes signify that they are under more stress. When the lizard is exposed to a stressor, the stripes on the lizards' body transition from a brown color to a pale blue or green.

These lizards also tend to use these brighter colored stripes when they are walking over surfaces that are dull colors, such as green and brown. This is called disruptive camouflage. With the use of contrasting colors and patterns, organisms are able to make the outlines of their body less visible to predators.

The brighter body coloration is also used by individuals in the species to increase their mating success. By making their colors more noticeable and conspicuous, they are able to become more noticeable by potential mates. At the same time, however, the brighter colors also make them more susceptible to being attacked by predators. Water anoles with brighter body and dewlap coloration are attacked by predators at a higher rate than those with duller colors. Therefore, the trait of body coloration is one that is under the influence of two contradicting results: an increase in reproductive success and a decrease in survival rate.

== Behavior ==
=== Physiological ===
The water anole is unusual in that it is able to stay underwater for long periods of time – a behavior that is described as "scuba diving". Experiments have confirmed that this species has the ability to remain underwater for up to 16 minutes. Since these lizards have relatively slow running speeds compared to their predators, it has been hypothesized that these lizards have adapted this "scuba diving" to enable them to avoid predators. By submerging themselves underwater for prolonged periods of time, the water anole is able to remain invisible to its predator. These lizards often endure extreme hypoxia before returning to the surface if they perceive a predator and compromise their ability for future escape ability. It has also been confirmed that many of the insects found in the water anoles' stomachs live primarily underwater. The water anoles use this "scuba diving" ability to hunt prey that live underwater and would otherwise be inaccessible to the lizards. Therefore, the anoles can escape predators and forage for food with this unique "scuba diving" behavior.

The reason that these lizards are able to remain submerged for long periods of time is their ability to create a bubble of air over heads while underwater. These anoles are semi-aquatic and when threatened or searching for prey they will jump from trees or rocks into water. When submerged, the lizards exhale and form an air bubble on the end of their snouts. Researchers have suggested that this species inhales and exhales the oxygen in the air bubble for a lengthy time period - a mechanism that ultimately permits their prolonged submersion. Researchers have also measured the oxygen saturation inside the air bubble over time and have found that it decreases with time underwater. This suggests the lizards are rebreathing through the air bubble. In addition, it has been suggested that the lizard simultaneously uses the air bubble to remove carbon dioxide from its body. The inspiration of carbon dioxide shortens the duration of the dive and the air bubble can serve as a way to get rid of waste carbon dioxide. Carbon dioxide is highly soluble in water and because the partial pressure of carbon dioxide is much higher in the bubble than in the surrounding water, the carbon dioxide can easily be cleared from the bubble. The formation of an air bubble in water anoles is likely facilitated by the highly hydrophobic character of their skin. In 2024, the idea that these lizards use air bubbles for rebreathing was empirically tested by applying an emollient to their skin to prevent bubble formation. Lizards that could rebreathe normally were able to stay underwater an average 32% longer than those which could not.

=== Social ===
The water anole exhibits the behavior of residing in different locations based on age and gender. These locations are determined based on their distance from the river, and their height above the river. Members of the species prefer to be located as close to the river as they can. Those of higher social or demographic class reside on higher perches, and live closer to the river. These perches are occupied by adult males, who tend to live on the highest perches and live closest to the river. Juvenile lizards and male lizards tend to live in exposed areas beside the river, while adult female lizards tend to choose areas that have cover.

== Reproduction ==
The reproductive season for this species is year round. On average, their clutch size is around one or two eggs per reproductive cycle. Female water anoles reach sexual maturity at an earlier age than their male counterparts, and also have a smaller snout-anus length than males do at their sexual maturity. Males have a larger growth rate than females, and they reach a greater body size than females when they are of the same age. Site selection has been determined to be carried out by the female, meaning that the male approaches the female in the mating process. Complete copulation takes from around 90 seconds to 105 seconds, and they do not exhibit any courtship behaviors after the copulation has concluded. The water anoles lay their eggs in cracks and openings in rocks and earth. The average incubation temperature is from 19° to 23 °C in natural conditions, and the average incubation time is from 75 to 82 days.

== Predators ==
There are three species that have been documented to be preying on the Anolis aquaticus: one species of crab and two species of bird. When threatened, the Anolis aquaticus partakes in a combination of surface swimming and "scuba diving". These anti-predatory behaviors allow this lizard to migrate between the banks and boulders of its habitat into nearby streams. These behaviors may also allow the water anole to swim a short distance with upstream current or with the downstream current to a different location. In both scenarios, the water anole's ability to remain underwater for a prolonged period enables them to engage in both of these effective anti-predatory strategies.

== Population ==
There is some notable activity within the water anole species that can be seen by analyzing characteristics within the species' populations. The sex ratio in the population remains at around 1:1 between males and females. Females reach sexual maturity at around 4 to 6 months of age, and males reach sexual maturity at around 5 to 7 months of age. This means that on average, females reach sexual maturity earlier than males. Males in the species tend to keep one to three females in their territory, and these females do not allow other females from entering the territory. There is significant sexual dimorphism that can be seen by the size difference between males and females in the species, with males being larger than females. Although male adults grow to a larger size than female adults, their growth rates after they have reached adulthood is about the same. The growth rate of a juvenile male is therefore significantly greater than the growth rate of a juvenile female.

The abundance of all members of a population, including males, females, and juveniles, fluctuates based on the season, with drier seasons yielding larger population sizes. The population sizes have been seen ranging from 86 individuals to 575 individuals, which would lead to different population densities based on the season. In populations of this species, there tends to be greater numbers of individuals that are mature and large in size compared to the relatively fewer individuals that are still considered juvenile. New members are introduced to a population and recruited at a rate of around 25% to 37% of the population size before recruitment. On average, more males are recruited than females, and males also tend to outlive and survive for a longer time than females.

== Evolution and adaptation ==
Diving lizards, such as the Anolis aquaticus, are believed to have evolved to be able to respire while staying underwater by holding air between their cuticles and the water that they are surrounded with. This is a development that was necessary for the lizards, that were initially terrestrial creatures restricted only to breathing directly through the air, to be able to dive underwater, which aids them in concealing themselves from predators. It is through this mechanisms that these semi-aquatic anoles are able to stay underwater for such long periods of time. These lizards have developed a method known as "rebreathing", in which they are able to breathe in and out using a nasal air bubble, which is made possible by a layer of air between the water and hydrophobic skin of the lizard. This hydrophobic skin, however, is a trait that can be seen among terrestrial anole species as well, that may benefit them in their ability to effectively dive. This suggests that a shift in function, or exaptation, may have occurred over the course of the anoles' evolution.
