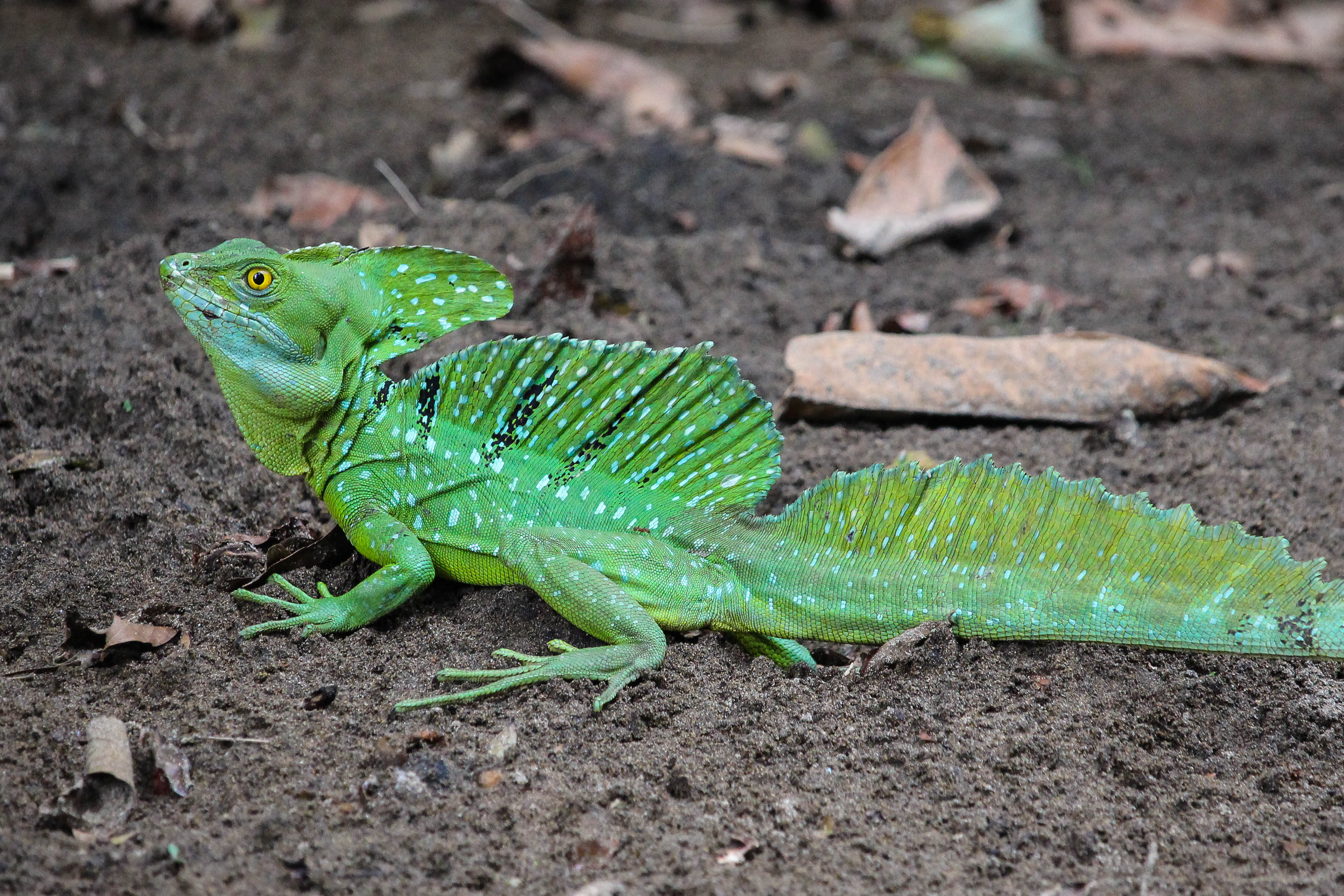
- Male, Alajuela Province, Costa Rica
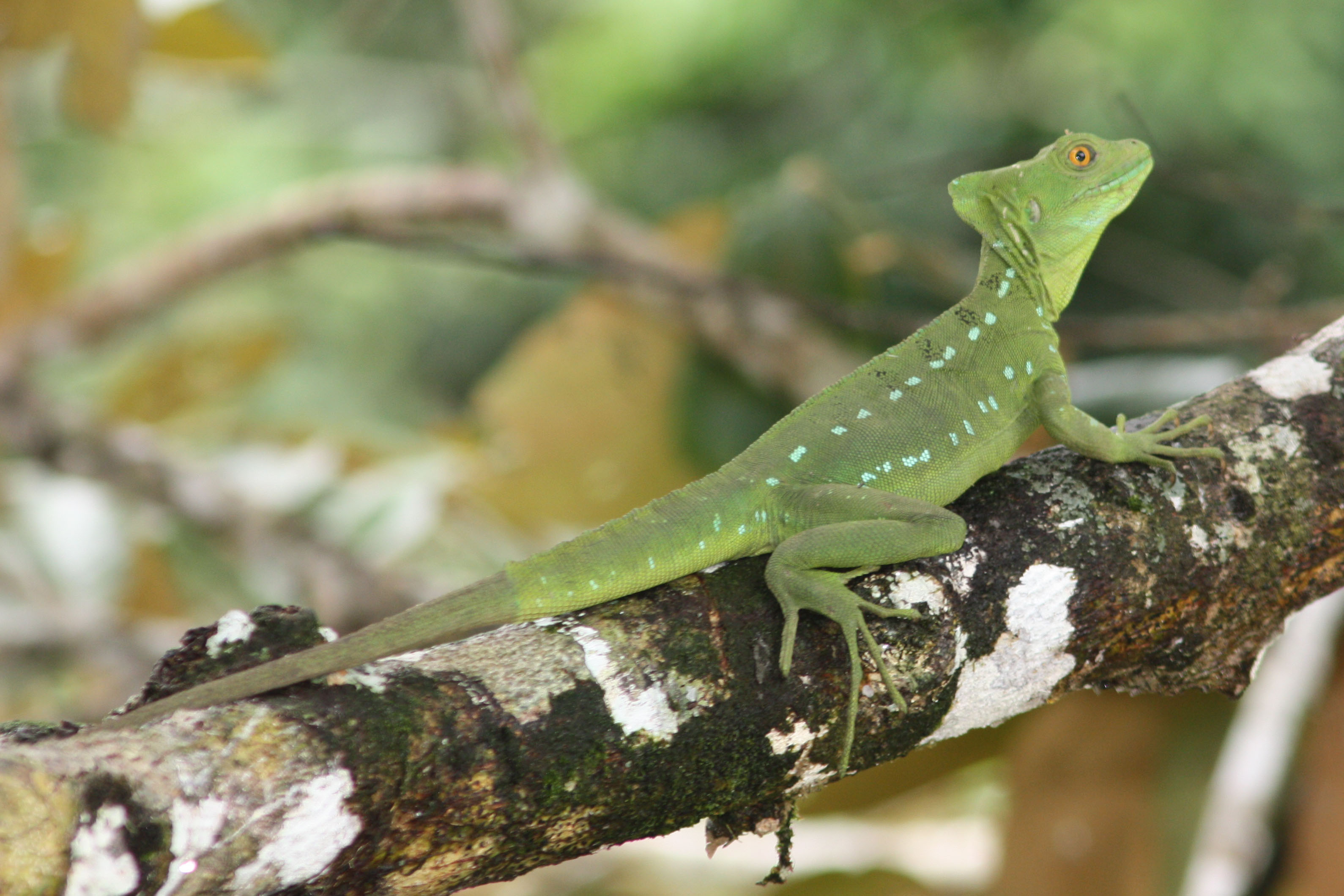
- Female plumed basilisk

Conservation status
- Least Concern (IUCN 3.1)

Scientific classification
- Kingdom: Animalia
- Phylum: Chordata
- Class: Reptilia
- Order: Squamata
- Suborder: Iguania
- Family: Corytophanidae
- Genus: Basiliscus
- Species: B. plumifrons

Binomial name
- Basiliscus plumifrons Cope, 1875

= Plumed basilisk =

Species of lizard

The plumed basilisk (Basiliscus plumifrons), also called the green basilisk, double crested basilisk, or Jesus Christ lizard, is a species of lizard in the family Corytophanidae. The species is native to Central America.

The plumed basilisk's native range spans southern Mexico and northern Colombia. B. plumifrons inhabits hot, humid rainforests that contain streams, rivers or other water bodies.

The physical appearance of the plumed basilisk is striking: it sports a bright green color along its body with black and white streaks along its neck and back. Their physical appearance differs by sex, as they are sexually dimorphic; males have a distinct crest on the back and tail and large plumes on top of their heads, while females typically only have a singular, much smaller, crest on their head.

The green crested or plumed lizard is unique in its ability to run across water with speed and the method it employs to do this. It displays the behaviour as a threat response, when fleeing predators. High speed is maintained in order to prevent sinking.

This lizard is extraordinarily territorial and is known for its aggressive behaviour to the extent that multiple male lizards cannot be maintained within the same enclosure. However, they do exist in the wild in large groups that allow for multiple males.

== Habitat and distribution ==
B. plumifrons’ habitat is restricted to rainforests that are in close proximity to running streams, such as occur in southern Mexico and northern Colombia. Moist lowlands of wet, mature forest, with running streams are their preferred environments. Their habitat is typically hot and humid. Agroforestry systems, with the integration of forest life (trees), is necessary for the preservation of the B. plumifrons species. While the plumed basilisk is native to southern Mexico and northern Colombian rainforests, there is evidence to suggest that it occupies land across the Atlantic versant spanning eastern Honduras to western Panama. Additionally, B. plumifrons have been sighted along the Pacific coast in southwestern Costa Rica.

B. plumifrons is arboreal (preferential to tree landscape for their habitat), and diurnally active (active during the day). Of the three species of Basiliscus present in Costa Rica each is found commonly on both versants (borders of land). B. plumifrons are aquatic lizards, found in high prevalence and widespread in Central American inland rivers, streams, ponds, and lakes, in addition to beaches and seashores. This species is unique in that it is both arboreal and aquatic and can be found in large numbers in both trees and perched on boulders near bodies of water.

The temperature preference of B. plumifrons is between 31.7 ± 0.5 °C (89.1 ± 0.9 °F).

== Taxonomy and etymology ==
The Green basilisk's generic name Basiliscus is taken from the legendary reptilian creature of European mythology which could kill with a glance, by turning a person to stone with its gaze: the Basilisk. This name derives from the Greek basilískos (βασιλίσκος) meaning "little king". This generic name was given in Carl Linnaeus' 10th edition of Systema Naturae.

For the origin of the nickname "Jesus Christ lizard", see § Behaviour.

== Description ==
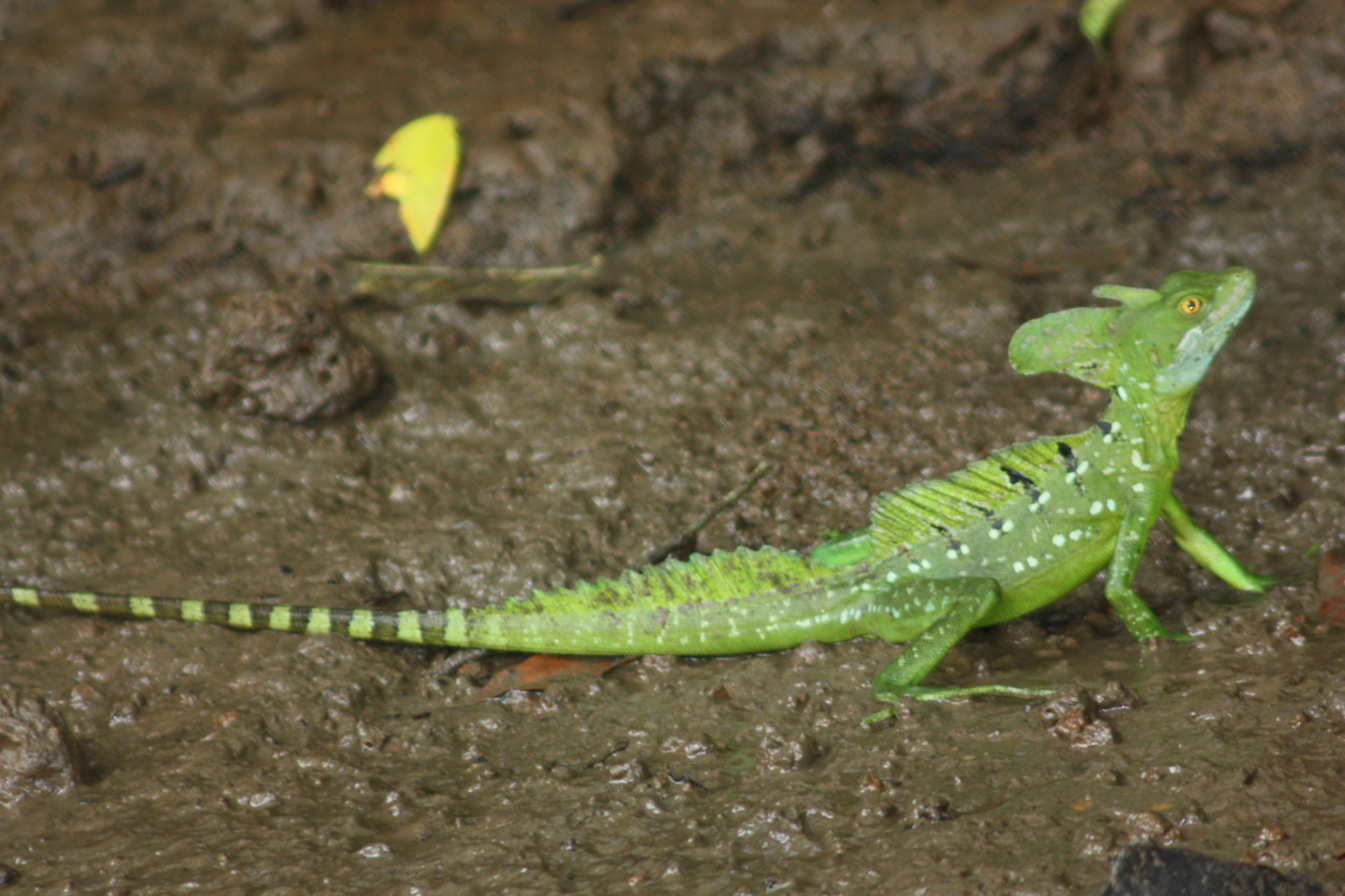
Male plumed basilisk

The plumed basilisk is the largest basilisk species, with an average snout-to-vent length (SVL) of 10 inches (25 cm). Including the tail, it can reach 3 feet (91 cm) in total length. Adults are brilliant green, with bright yellow eyes, and small bluish spots along the dorsal ridge. Males have three crests: one on the head, one on the back, and one on the tail, while females have only the head crest. Juveniles are less conspicuously colored, and lack the characteristic crests.

The green crested basilisk of B. plumifrons is a bright green lizard species found with varying streaks of white dark grey, and blue markings along its body. However, some alternative forms or subspecies of B. plumifrons have been seen to sport only black markings along its dorsal side. The underbelly of this lizard is typically a lighter shade of green than the bright green that is shown throughout its body. Its head is triangular from side view or profile, with openings for ears. These openings are slightly larger than the size of their eyes. The B. plumifrons mostly have round eyes, round pupils, and yellow irises. Small granular scales comprise the main covering for their skin. The length of the hind legs are longer than the front limbs as the hind legs are used for water running. In addition, their toes are laterally angled and flat to allow for water running. Adult males have four prominent vertebral crests: a dorsal crest, a tail crest, one atop the crown of the head, and one between their eyes. These crests form the greater physical distinction between female and male plumed basilisks. The females have only two reduced crests: a tail crest, and head crest. This characteristic is shared with the juveniles of the species.

Video clip

== Predators ==
The predators of B. plumifrons include birds of prey, opossums, coati, and snakes.

== Behaviour ==
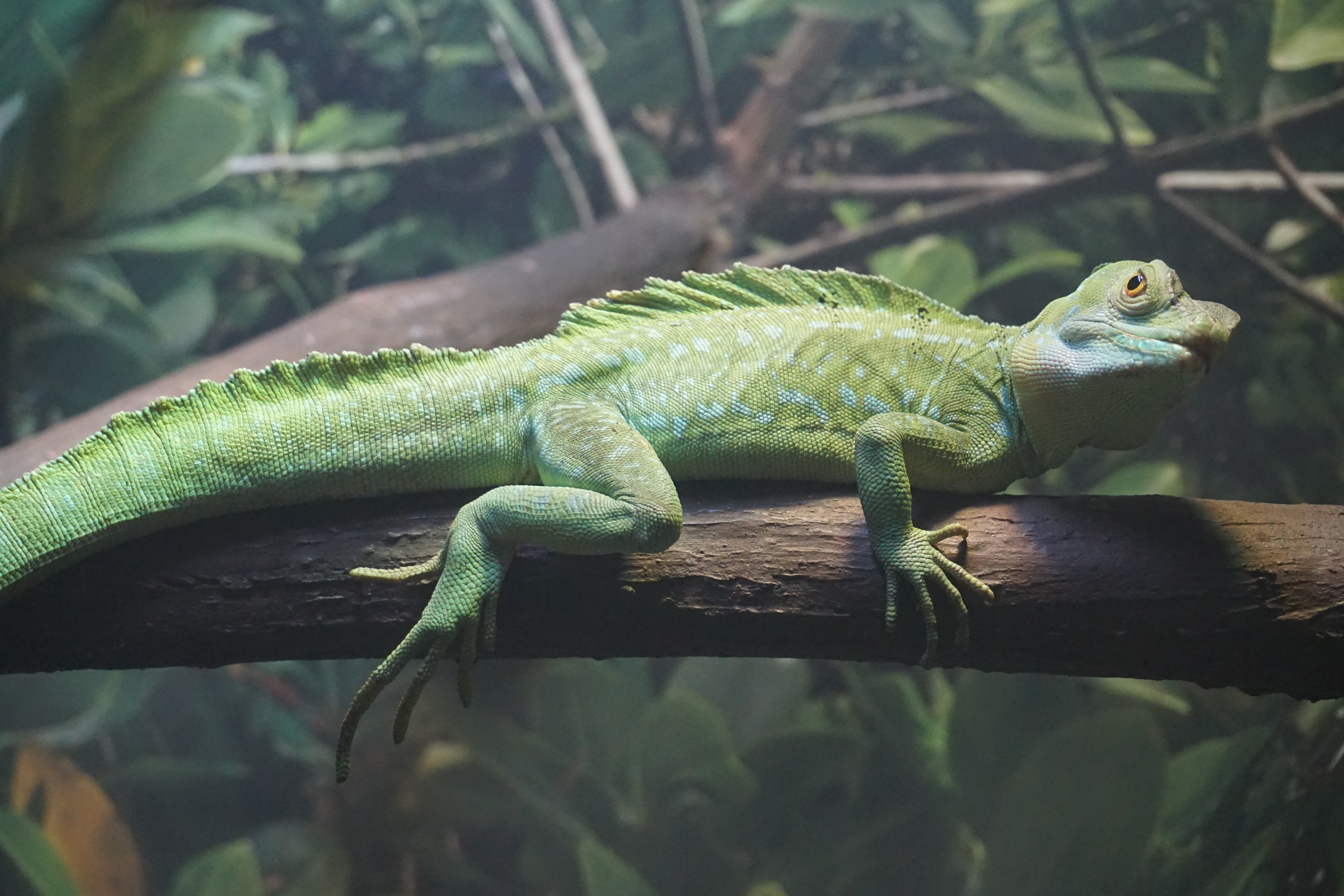
A plumed basilisk at the Milwaukee Public Museum

Male plumed basilisks are territorial; a single male may defend a territory that several females inhabit, with which he mates. Plumed basilisks do not tolerate much handling when kept in captivity.

B. plumifrons is able to run short distances across the water using both its feet and tail for support, an ability shared with other basilisks and the Malaysian sail-finned lizard, When running, they create an air cavity which they use to push themselves forward with their feet which is mostly seen in adult basilisk lizards. The adults have a greater mass than juveniles so there is less hydrodynamic lag and they are able to run across the water in order to escape their predators. This has earned the plumed basilisk the nickname "Jesus Christ lizard", as a reference to the biblical event of Jesus walking on water. It is also an excellent swimmer and can stay underwater for up to an hour.

Most distinct to the B. plumifrons is the ability to run across water. Plumed basilisks will employ this behaviour in response to perceived threats experienced from surrounding predators or predatory potential. They use this strategy most commonly when they are in fear or under duress. B. plumifrons run bipedally (applying the use of both hind legs), utilizing both the foot and shank for immersion into water when their limbs are outstretched. Other lizard species utilise similar threat responses (for example, Anolis aquaticus, A. barkeri). This behaviour may be more advantageous than other responses such as water diving or swimming used by other lizard species, as it allows for escape from other aquatic predators (such as snakes, crocodiles, and large fish).

The speed at which the plumed basilisk is able to navigate water running is determined largely by each individual's hindlimb elongation potential. The hindlimb controls the locomotor gait and the stretch of the hindlimb allows for greater surface area and thus a greater velocity. In addition, it is proposed that the surface area of the lizard's foot is a considerable factor in gaining speed. This is a unique benefit to the B. plumifrons, as it has toes directed in a rotated orientation allowing for greater surface area of the foot to run across water. Typically the adult B. plumifrons is able to run across water at a speed of 2.14 m/s (7.0 ft/s) and lesser speed for juvenile B. plumifrons. While other species of lizards do employ water running behaviours, it has been shown that B. plumifrons are of the more preferential lizard species to water running and are typically less hesitant to utilize this skill.

=== Running on water ===
Basilisk lizards are notable for their remarkable ability to scamper across water from the time they are born. Both juvenile and adult basilisk lizards tend to use this unique trait to avoid predation. The mechanisms that allow these lizards to run across water is the result of elongated hind legs with webbing between the toes. This webbing captures pockets of air which allows the basilisk to quickly push off of water.

While some insects are able to run on water using surface tension, basilisk lizards, which have much more mass, achieve this through alternative fluid dynamics. This lizard will use its hind leg to penetrate the surface of the water beneath it to create an air-filled cavity and then retract its leg before the cavity closes. This enables the basilisk lizard to minimize its contact with water. Additionally, this running technique reduces the drag experienced during the run while simultaneously allowing the lizard's body to be propelled across the water at an average speed of 1.6 m/s (5.2 ft/s).

Although all Basilisk lizards harness this water-running ability, there is notably kinematic variation in these runs for these lizards - variation that is primarily due to differences in running velocity and not differences in the mass of the lizards running. This kinematic variation is unique to basilisk lizards. For other land lizards, kinematic variations in their running are generally similar. Studies have also indicated that the basilisks hindlimbs act as the primary force producer when they are running on water.

The basilisk lizard's remarkable ability to run on water has allowed scientists working with bipedal and quadrupedal robots to potentially create man-made technology that could also run on water through similar mechanisms.

=== Reproduction and life cycle ===
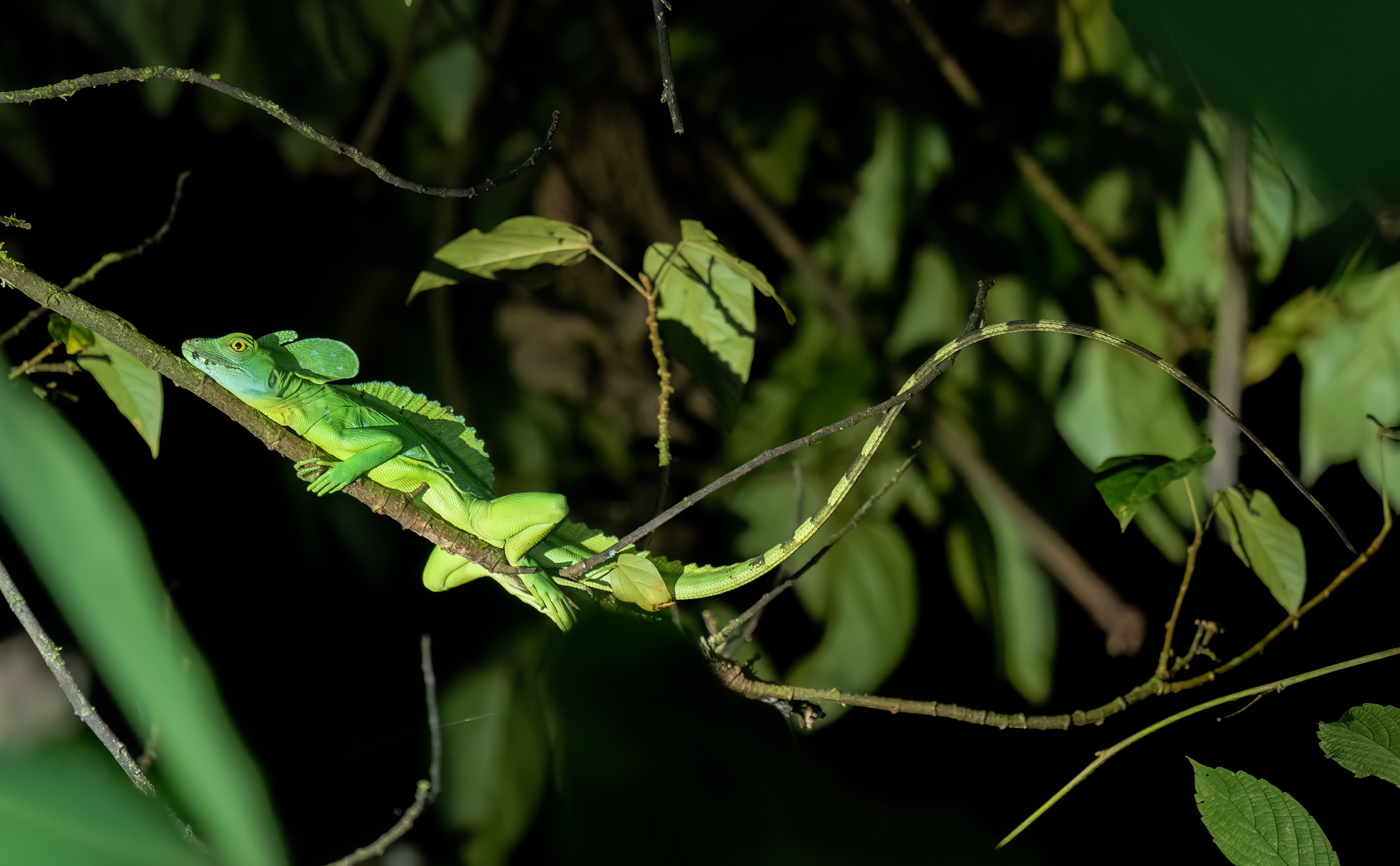
Plumed basilisk resting at night in Costa Rica

During the week prior to laying, sexually mature females of B. plumifrons were observed presenting herself to the male. The female would position herself about 0.5 m (1 ft 8 in) from the male, lowering her forebody to the sand and raising her pelvic region and tail. Females lay five to fifteen eggs at a time in warm, damp sand or soil. One mother lizard in captivity actually was observed to start digging holes (sometimes referred to as nests) in the soil six months prior to ovipositing, well ahead of the breeding season. The eggs hatch after eight to ten weeks, at which point they emerge as fully independent lizards, although averaging only 43 mm (1.7 in) SVL (Snout-to-Vent Length) and weighing only about 2 grams (0.071 oz). The juvenile males would start to develop the large crests which are characteristic of the male B. plumifrons after six month or up to more than one year, depending on the body conditions of the juveniles.

Female B. plumifrons start "showing" (become visibly plump) one to two weeks post-fertilization. During the third week of gestation, females will begin to search for a site to burrow or lay approximately 14–17 eggs. Typically, the size and quantity of eggs will vary depending on the lifestyle and physical characteristics of the mother (i.e. age, health, and size). It is common for plumed basilisk females to lay multiple clutches within a given season and this event will occur up to four or five times during a given breeding season. Hatching of eggs occurs over a one to two day period after a gestation and incubation period of eight to ten weeks.

=== Diet ===
B. plumifrons are an omnivorous species, their diet is inclusive of both animals and vegetation. While vertebrate meat may be a stretch from their typical consumption, they choose to eat a large variety of insects and worms. While they are capable of consuming vegetation (such as fruits, seeds, flowers, and leaves), it is less sought out in the wild as opposed to captivity for the B. plumifrons. While they do hunt smaller sized animals such as fish, small mammals (such as rodents), small birds, small nonvenomous snakes, smaller species of lizards, amphibians, and invertebrates (crustaceans, such as freshwater shrimp and crayfish, and spiders), they are most often found in search of insects for their diet.

They typically consume brown crickets, black crickets, and locusts. In captivity, some owners choose to feed their B. plumifrons or green crested lizard wax worms, calciworms, cockroaches, mealworms, and beetle worms on occasion. This latter selection of worms, roaches, and beetles are not the best suitable for the B. plumifrons diet as they are found to be high in fat and can be difficult to digest for juvenile B. plumifrons.
