= Uquiasaurus =

Uquiasaurus Temporal range: Late Pliocene (Uquian)

Scientific classification
- Kingdom: Animalia
- Phylum: Chordata
- Class: Reptilia
- Order: Squamata
- Suborder: Iguania
- Infraorder: Pleurodonta
- Genus: †Uquiasaurus; Daza et al., 2012

Type species
- †Uquiasaurus heptanodonta Daza et al., 2012

Extinct genus of lizards

Uquiasaurus is an extinct genus of iguanian lizards represented by the type species Uquiasaurus heptanodonta from the Late Pliocene of Argentina. Uquiasaurus was first described in 2012 on the basis of isolated snout and jaw bones within the Uquía Formation, the namesake of the genus. These bones were preserved in a midden of predatory bird pellets and are part of a microvertebrate assemblage that includes the bones of rodents, marsupials, frogs, birds, and other lizards, one of the few to document the mixing of North and South American faunas during the Great American Interchange. Phylogenetic analysis indicates that Uquiasaurus is part of a clade (evolutionary grouping) of iguanians that includes the living families Liolaemidae, Leiocephalidae, and Tropiduridae. The status of U. heptanodonta as a valid taxon was contested by Scanferla & Díaz-Fernández (2023), who reinterpreted the type series of this species as a fossil bone assemblage composed by more than one species of Liolaemus. Below is a cladogram from Daza et al. (2012) showing its phylogenetic relationships:

== Taxonomy ==
- Iguania
  - Hoyalacerta
  - - - Huehuecuetzpalli
      - Pristiguana
    - - Chamaeleontiformes
        - †Priscagamidae
        - Acrodonta
      - Iguanoidea
        - - †Gobiguania
          - Silvaiguana
            - Polychrotidae
            - Hoplocercidae
        - Euiguana
          - Corytophanidae
          - Terraiguana
            - - Iguanidae
              - Crotaphytidae
            - - Phrynosomatidae
              - - †Uquiasaurus
                - - Liolaemidae
                  - - Leiocephalidae
                    - Tropiduridae
