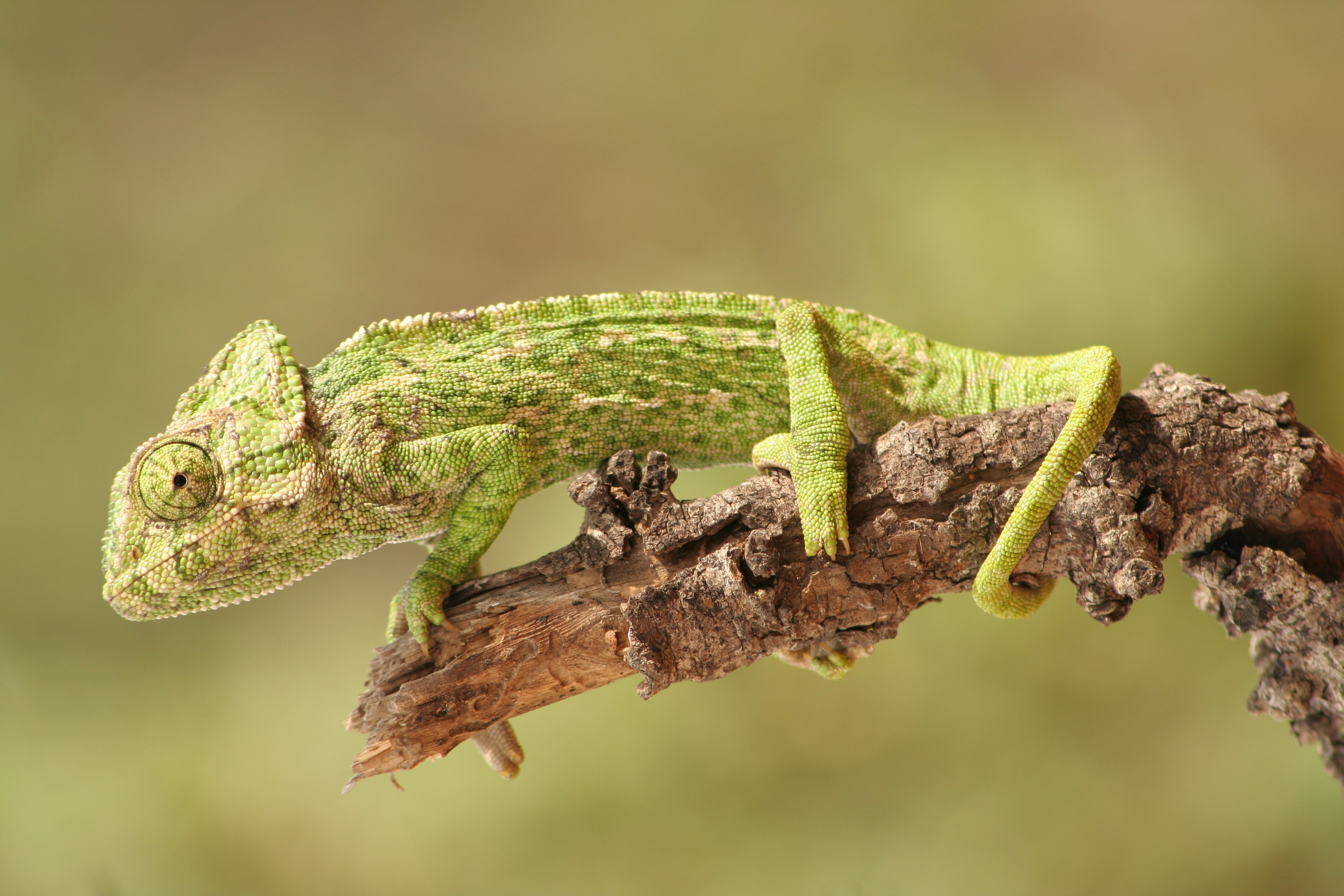
- Common chameleon, Chamaeleo chamaeleon

Scientific classification
- Kingdom: Animalia
- Phylum: Chordata
- Class: Reptilia
- Order: Squamata
- Suborder: Iguania
- (unranked): Chamaeleontiformes; Conrad, 2008

Subgroups
- †Isodontosaurus? †Priscagamidae; Acrodonta

= Chamaeleontiformes =

Chamaeleontiformes Temporal range: Early Jurassic- present, 190–0 Ma

Clade of lizards

Chamaeleontiformes is a hypothesized clade (evolutionary grouping) of iguanian lizards defined as all taxa sharing a more recent common ancestor with Chamaeleo chamaeleon (the common chamaeleon) than with Hoplocercus spinosus (the Brazilian spiny-tailed lizard), Polychrus marmoratus (bush lizard), or Iguana iguana (green iguana). It was named by paleontologist Jack Conrad in 2008 to describe a clade recovered in his phylogenetic analysis that included the extinct genus Isodontosaurus, the extinct family Priscagamidae, and the living clade Acrodonta, which includes agamids and chameleons. It is a stem-based taxon and one of two major clades within Iguania, the other being Pleurodonta. Below is a cladogram from Daza et al. (2012) showing this phylogeny:

- Iguanomorpha
  - †Hoyalacerta sanzi
  - - - †Huehuecuetzpalli mixtecus
      - †Pristiguana brasiliensis
    - Iguania
      - Chamaeleontiformes
        - †Priscagamidae
        - Acrodonta
      - Iguanoidea (=Pleurodonta)

Other analyses place Priscagamidae outside Iguania altogether, resulting in a Chamaeleontiformes that only includes Isodontosaurus and Acrodonta. Below is a cladogram from Conrad (2015) with this phylogeny:

- Iguanomorpha
  - †Priscagamidae
  - - †Gobiguania
    - Iguania
      - Chamaeleontiformes
        - †Isodontosaurus gracilis
        - Acrodonta
      - Pleurodonta
