= Bharatagama =

Bharatagama Temporal range: Early Jurassic, 190 Ma

Scientific classification
- Kingdom: Animalia
- Phylum: Chordata
- Class: Reptilia
- Superorder: Lepidosauria
- Genus: †Bharatagama; Evans, Prasad & Manhas, 2002

Type species
- †Bharatagama rebbanensis Evans, Prasad & Manhas, 2002

Extinct genus of lizards

Bharatagama is an extinct genus of lepidosaur from the Early Jurassic of India. It has been suggested to be one of the oldest known lizards and the oldest known iguanian. The type and only species is Bharatagama rebbanensis, named in 2002. Over one hundred fossils of Bharatagama have been found in the Kota Formation, which outcrops in the Pranhita–Godavari Basin and dates back to about 190 million years ago (Ma). Despite its abundance, Bharatagama is known only from isolated jaw bones mixed together in microvertebrate assemblages with equally fragmentary remains of fish, sphenodontians, dinosaurs, crocodylomorphs, and mammals. These fossils represent all stages of development, from hatchlings to adults. The total length of the skull in adult specimens is estimated to have been about 15 millimetres (0.59 in). Later analysis suggested that the taxon might be a member of Rhynchocephalia.

== Description and relationships ==
Bharatagama has been suggested to belong a group of iguanians called Acrodonta, which today includes chameleons and agamids. Modern acrodontans are characterized by their acrodont dentition, meaning that their teeth implant along the margins of the jaws rather than their inner surfaces, the so-called pleurodont dentition seen in most other lizards. Most of the teeth in the jaws of Bharatagama are acrodont, but the first five pairs in the lower jaw and first four in the upper jaw are pleurodont. These teeth are enlarged, recurved, and striated. The acrodont teeth behind them are sharp and triangular, likely adapted for shearing food. Some specimens preserve hatchling teeth between the acrodont and pleurodont teeth, which are conical and laterally compressed.

Sphenodontians are also abundant in the Kota microvertebrate assemblage and have acrodont dentitions, raising the possibility that Bharatagama is not one of the earliest lizards but rather a sphenodontian misidentified as a lizard. Bharatagama also shares with sphenodontians an enlarged coronoid process on the lower jaw. However, this feature is also seen in some acrodontans and is not unique to Sphenodontia. The combination of features such as pleurodont teeth at the front of the jaws, hatchling teeth behind them, the lack of wear marks on the inner surfaces of the teeth (a characteristic feature of sphenodontians), and the shape of the maxilla, premaxilla, and angular bones were suggested to be evidence Bharatagama being an early acrodont lizard. However, a later 2018 study suggested that the taxon had more in common with rhynchocephalians that squamates, and that it had no unambiguous synampomorphies that would warrant it being placed in Squamata.

== Biogeography and evolutionary context ==
Aside from Bharatagama, the oldest known lizards are from circa-165 Ma Middle Jurassic deposits in England. These lizards are all members of Scleroglossa, a large clade or evolutionary grouping hypothesized to include all non-iguanian lizards. The presence of Bharatagama 190 million years ago in India provides evidence that the basal split between Iguania and Scleroglossa occurred around this time, and that the earliest iguanians underwent an evolutionary radiation in the southern supercontinent Gondwana. The paucity of early Mesozoic microvertebrate assemblages in regions formerly part of Gondwana may explain the large time gap between Bharatagama and Cretaceous iguanians, which lived in the northern supercontinent Laurasia and have a good fossil record in North America, Europe, and Asia.
