= Ipomoea gracilis =

Scientific classification
- Kingdom: Plantae
- Clade: Tracheophytes
- Clade: Angiosperms
- Clade: Eudicots
- Clade: Asterids
- Order: Solanales
- Family: Convolvulaceae
- Genus: Ipomoea
- Species: I. gracilis

Binomial name
- Ipomoea gracilis R.Br.

Synonyms
- Convolvulus gracilis (R.Br.) Spreng.

Species of flowering plant

Ipomoea gracilis is a plant in the bindweed family, Convolvulaceae. It is found in northern and north-eastern Australia.
