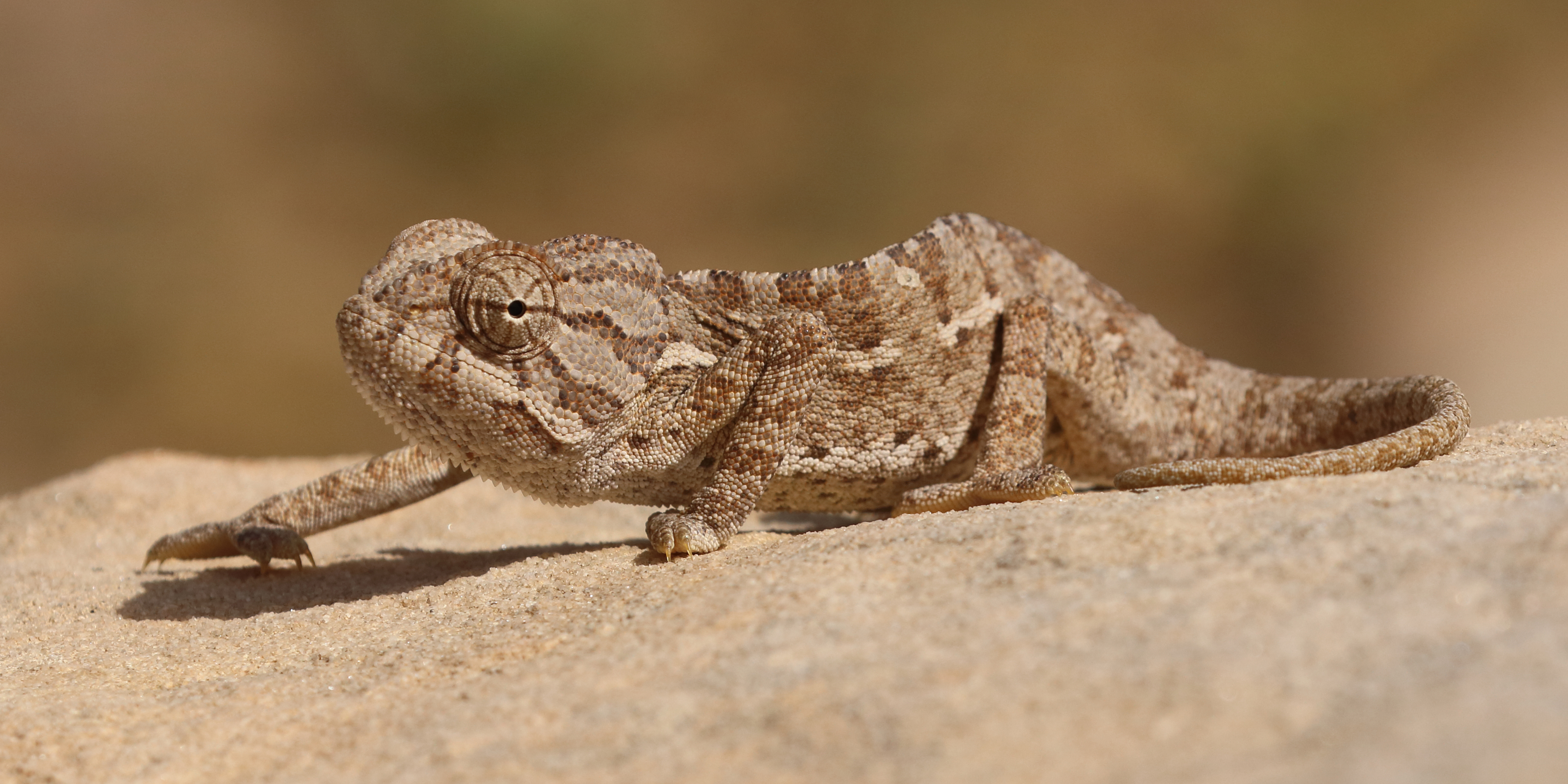
- C. c. recticrista Dana Biosphere Reserve, Jordan

Conservation status
- Least Concern (IUCN 3.1)

Scientific classification
- Kingdom: Animalia
- Phylum: Chordata
- Class: Reptilia
- Order: Squamata
- Suborder: Iguania
- Family: Chamaeleonidae
- Genus: Chamaeleo
- Species: C. chamaeleon

Binomial name
- Chamaeleo chamaeleon (Linnaeus, 1758)

Synonyms
- List: Cameleo siculus Grohmann, 1832; Chamaeleo carinatus Merrem, 1820; Chamaeleo cinereus Strauch, 1862; Chamaeleo parisiensium Laurenti, 1768; Chamaeleo saharicus Müller, 1887; Chamaeleo vulgaris Turner, 1853; Chamaeleo (Chamaeleo) chamaeleon Necas, 1999; Chamaeleon auratus Gray, 1865; Chamaeleon chamaeleon saharicus Werner, 1911; Chamaeleon fasciatus Smith, 1866; Chamaeleon vulgaris Daudin, 1802; Chameleo vulgaris Duméril, Bibron & Duméril, 1854; Chameleon parisiensis Gray, 1845; Chameleon parisientium Bosca, 1880; Lacerta chamaeleon Linnaeus, 1758

= Common chameleon =

Species of lizard

The common chameleon or Mediterranean chameleon (Chamaeleo chamaeleon) is a species of chameleon native to the Mediterranean Basin and parts surrounding the Red Sea. It is the only extant species of Chamaeleonidae with a range that naturally extends into Europe.

== Subspecies ==
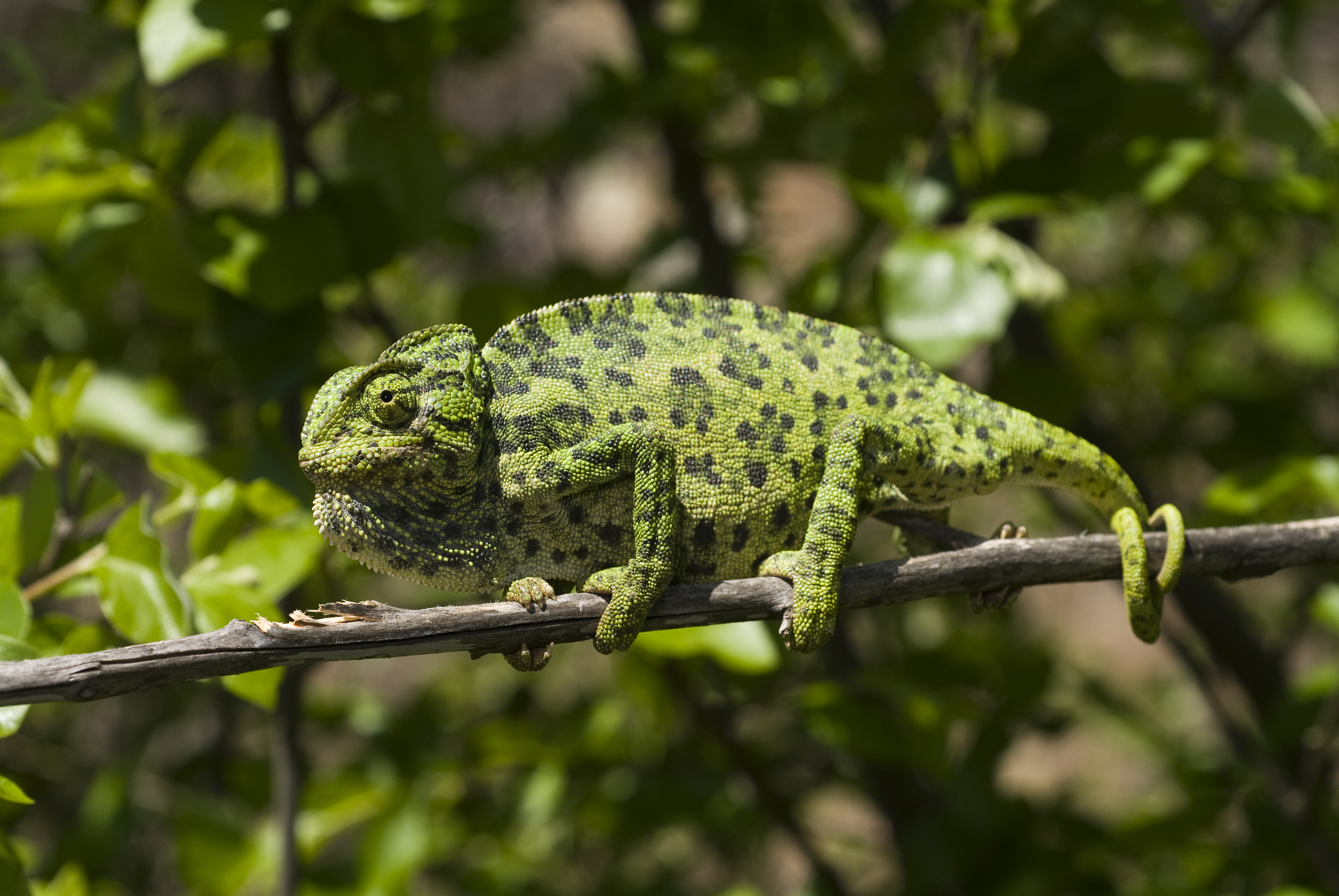
Chamaeleo chameleon

Four subspecies are currently recognized:

- C. c. chamaeleon (Linnaeus, 1758) – the nominate subspecies
- C. c. musae (Steindacher, 1900)
- C. c. orientalis (Parker 1938)
- C. c. rectricrista (Boettger, 1880)

== Description ==
The average length of the common chameleon is 20–40 cm (8–16 inches), with females often being substantially larger than males. The colour of the common chameleon is variable, between yellow/brown through green to a dark brown. Whatever the background colour is, the common chameleon will have two light coloured lines along its side. It has a small beard of scales and some small hard scales on the top of its back. Many assume the color changes undergone by the chameleon are a result of its attempting to camouflage itself, when in reality the chameleon changes its color as a response to light and temperature stimuli and as an expression of its emotions (like chameleon body language). Often when caught for analysis, the chameleon may turn a dark color. Their colors are also important for intraspecies communication, especially during the mating season.

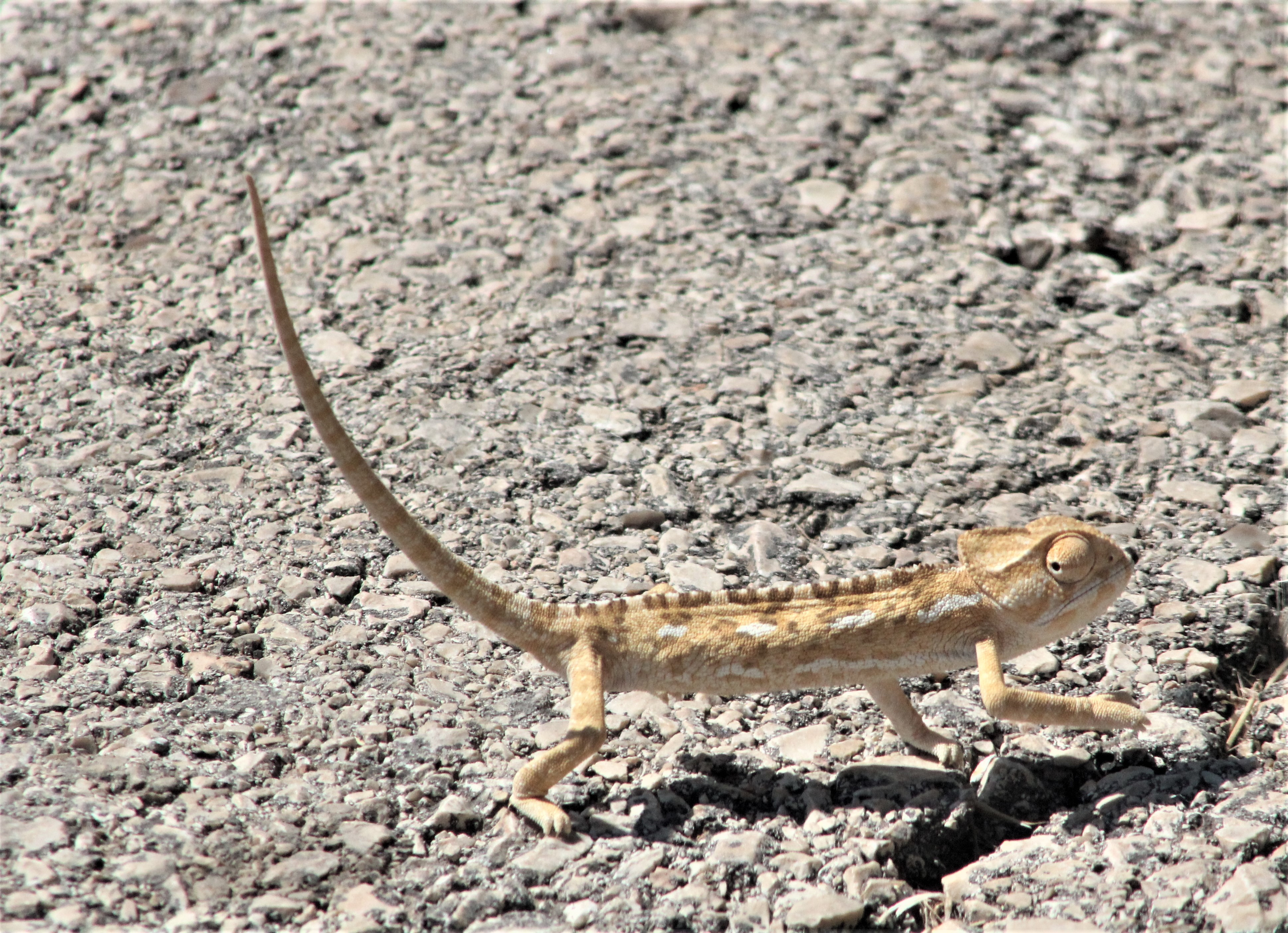
Chameleon in Northern Israel looking backwards

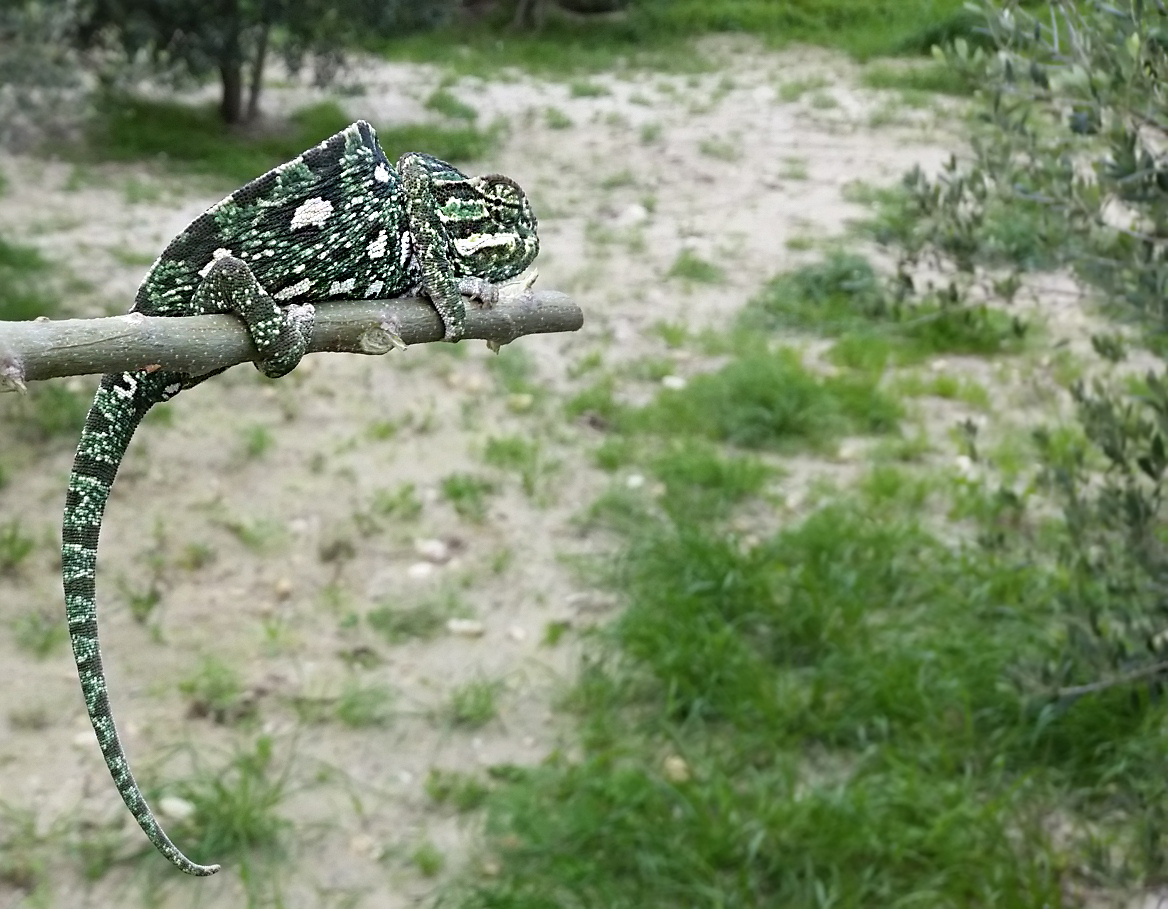
Bright-coloured chameleon in Malta

== Ecology ==
=== Diet ===
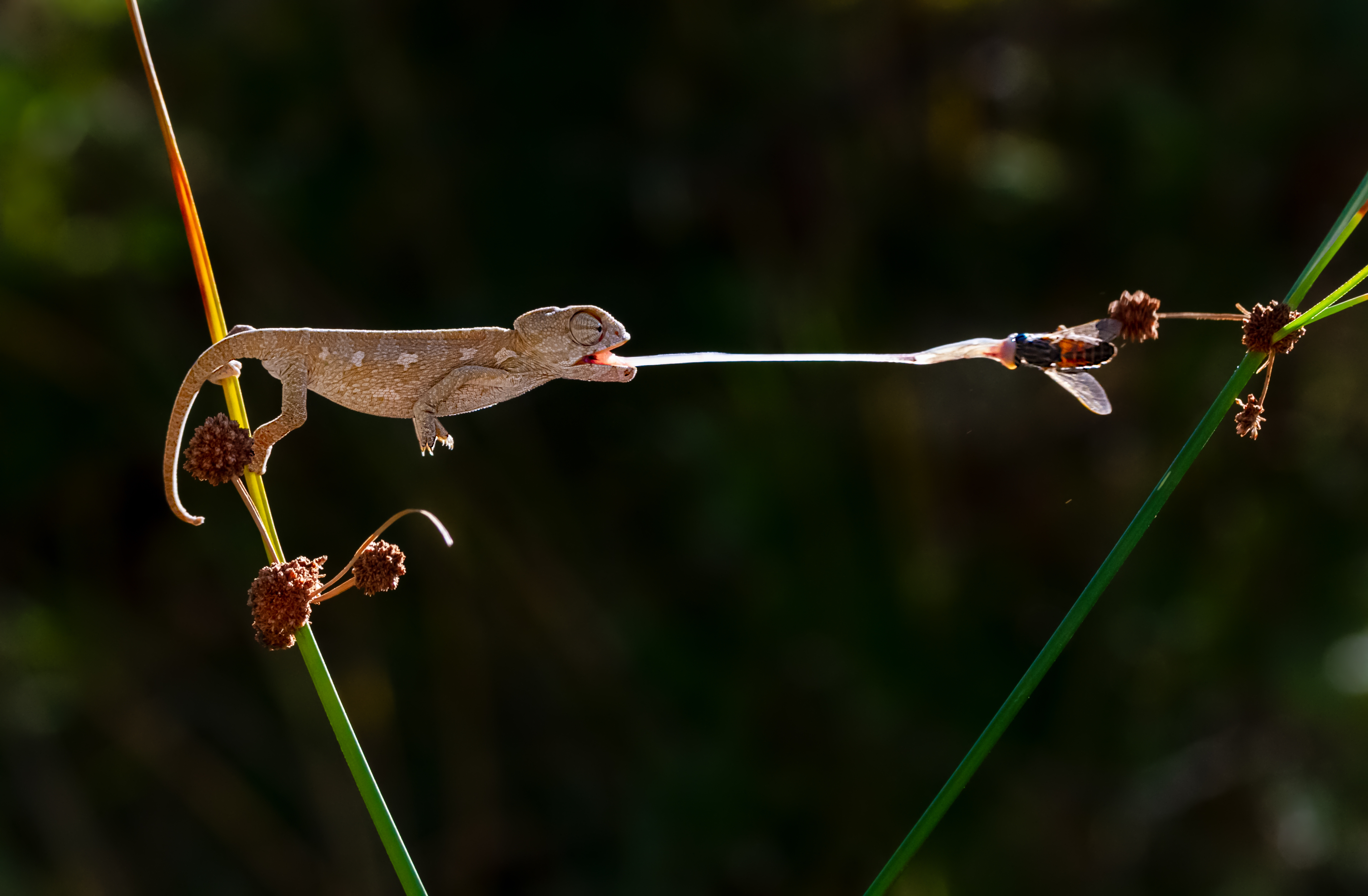
Common chameleon catching an insect.

The common chameleon is insectivorous, capturing insects by stealth and the rapid extension of its long tongue, which has a terminal pad which grasps and adheres to the prey. Common prey items include flies (Diptera), hymenopterans (Hymenoptera), true bugs (Heteroptera), crickets and grasshoppers (Orthoptera), and beetles (Coleoptera). Adults are known to eat young chameleons and have been observed to eat fruit.

=== Behaviour ===
The common chameleon like others of its family enjoys an arboreal habitat, scrambling about in trees and bushes with feet that have five toes, in groups of two or three on each side for grasping branches. It also uses its prehensile tail to maintain balance and stability. Movement is usually leisurely, often with a slight swaying motion to avoid detection by predators. The animal can move more rapidly when involved in a territorial dispute.

=== Reproduction ===
The common chameleon is usually solitary, maintaining a territory and only tolerating members of the opposite sex during the mating season. It is sexually mature within one year and the females produce one clutch of eggs per year. Larger females produce more eggs and are more attracted to males who will fight over a female. The mating season for the common chameleon is from mid-July to mid-September. The animals descend to lowers levels of vegetation or to the ground to search for a mate. The eggs are laid in the soil and take from 10–12 months to incubate. Adult animals, especially males, will eat young that they encounter.

== Distribution ==
In Europe, it is only autochthonous to: southern Portugal, southern Spain, southern Italy, Cyprus and the Greek island of Samos. Nevertheless, it has been successfully introduced into the Canary Islands and Malta. In Malta, Jesuit priests are thought to have introduced this species around 1880 in a small private garden in St. Julian's. Since then, this species seems to have flourished and spread across the island, with sightings being reported in Gozo, Malta's sister island. A small population is reported to be present in Apulia and Calabria in southern Italy.

In North Africa and the Middle East, it occurs in Morocco, Algeria, Tunisia, Libya, Egypt, Israel, Palestine, Jordan, Western Sahara, Saudi Arabia, Yemen, Turkey, Lebanon, Syria, Iraq, and Iran. In Greece, the species is now only found on the island of Samos, having disappeared from the other islands in recent years. Conservation efforts on Samos are being led by the Archipelagos Institute of Marine Conservation to preserve the remaining populations, but the species is not currently evaluated under the IUCN redlist.

== Conservation and threats ==
While the species is common throughout most of its range, it is threatened locally by habitat loss, principally through urban development, the intensification of agriculture, predation by domestic animals(especiallly cats), illegal collection for the pet trade, and high roadkill mortality. Wildfires constitute a threat in Turkey.
