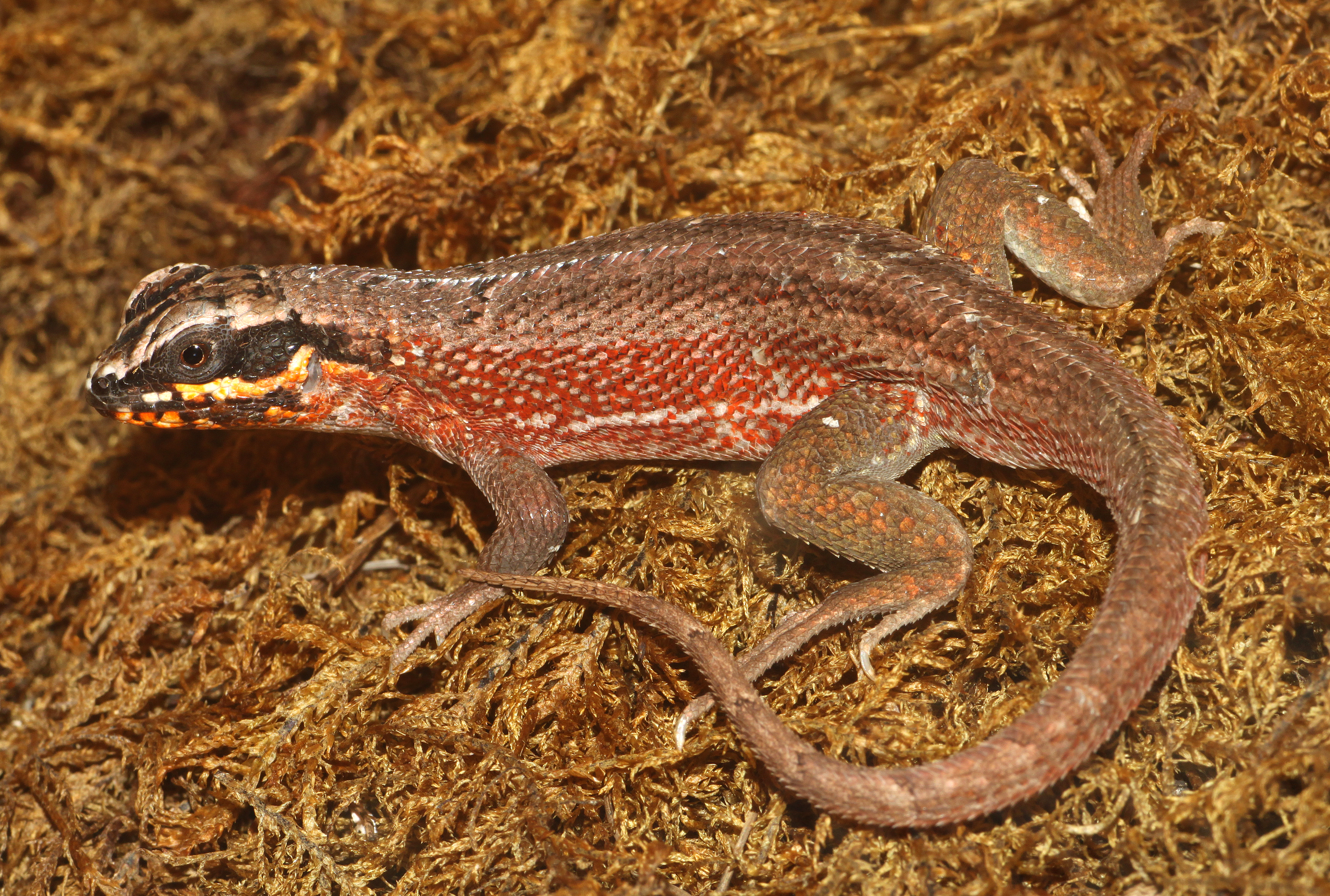
- Hispaniolan masked curly-tailed lizard (Leiocephalus personatus)
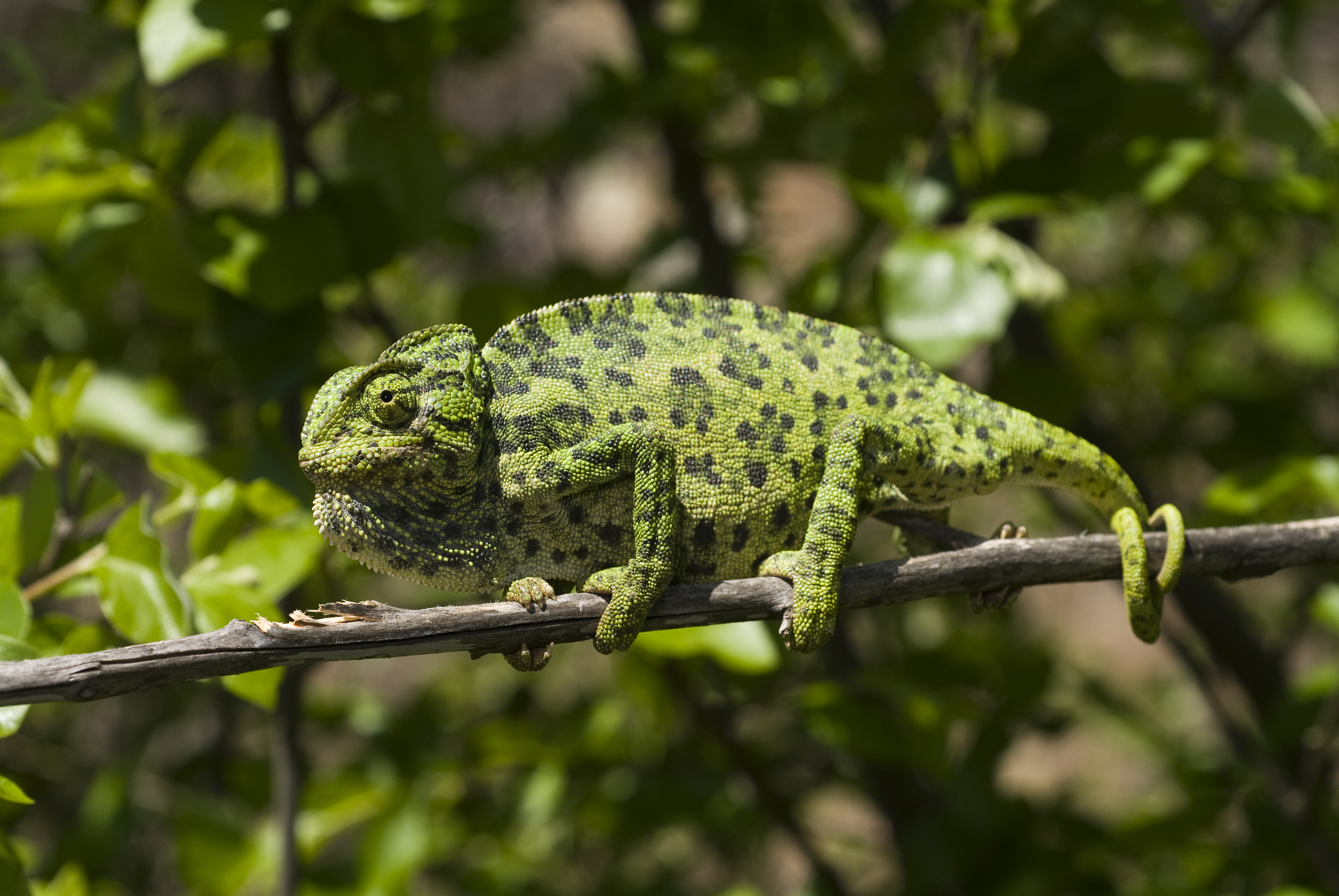
- Common chameleon (Chamaeleo chamaeleon)

Scientific classification
- Kingdom: Animalia
- Phylum: Chordata
- Class: Reptilia
- Order: Squamata
- Clade: Toxicofera
- Clade: Iguanomorpha
- Suborder: Iguania; Cope, 1864

Infraorders
- Acrodonta; Pleurodonta

= Iguania =

Iguania Temporal range: Early Cretaceous–Recent

Suborder of lizards

Iguania is a suborder of squamate reptiles that includes iguanas, chameleons, agamids, and New World lizards. Using morphological features as a guide to evolutionary relationships, the Iguania are believed to form the sister group to the Squamata, which comprise nearly 11,000 named species, roughly 2000 of which are iguanians. However, molecular information has placed Iguania well within the Squamata as sister taxa to the Anguimorpha and closely related to snakes. The order has been under debate and revisions after being classified by Charles Lewis Camp in 1923 due to difficulties finding adequate synapomorphic morphological characteristics. Most iguanians are arboreal but there are several terrestrial groups. They usually have primitive fleshy, non-prehensile tongues, although the tongue is highly modified in chameleons. Today they are scattered occurring in Madagascar, the Fiji and Friendly Islands and Western Hemisphere.

== Classification ==
The Iguania currently includes these extant families:

- Infraorder Acrodonta
  - Family Agamidae – agamid lizards, Old World arboreal lizards
  - Family Chamaeleonidae – chameleons
- Infraorder Pleurodonta – American arboreal lizards, chuckwallas, iguanas
  - Family Leiocephalidae
    - Genus Leiocephalus: curly-tailed lizards
  - Family Corytophanidae – helmet lizards
  - Family Crotaphytidae – collared lizards, leopard lizards
  - Family Hoplocercidae – dwarf and spinytail iguanas
  - Family Iguanidae – marine, Fijian, Galapagos land, spinytail, rock, desert, green, and chuckwalla iguanas
  - Family Tropiduridae – tropidurine lizards
    - subclade of Tropiduridae Tropidurini – neotropical ground lizards
  - Family Dactyloidae – anoles
  - Family Polychrotidae
    - subclade of Polychrotidae Polychrus
  - Family Phrynosomatidae – North American spiny lizards
  - Family Liolaemidae – South American swifts
  - Family Opluridae – Malagasy iguanas
  - Family Leiosauridae – leiosaurs
    - subclade of Leiosaurini Leiosaurae
    - subclade of Leiosaurini Anisolepae

== Phylogeny ==
Below is a cladogram from the phylogenetic analysis of Daza et al. (2012) (a morphological analysis), showing the interrelationships of extinct and living iguanians:

- Iguanomorpha
  - †Hoyalacerta sanzi
  - - - †Huehuecuetzpalli mixtecus
      - †Pristiguana brasiliensis
    - Iguania
      - Chamaeleontiformes
        - †Priscagamidae
          - †Mimeosaurus crassus
          - - †Priscagama gobiensis
            - †Phrynosomimus asper
        - Acrodonta
          - Physignathus
          - - - Agama
              - - Uromastyx
                - Leiolepis
            - - Rhampholeon
              - Brookesia
      - Iguanoidea (=Pleurodonta)
        - - †Gobiguania
            - †Polrussia mongoliensis
            - †Igua minuta
            - †Isodontosaurus gracilis
            - - †Anchaurosaurus gilmorei
              - †Zapsosaurus sceliphros
            - - †Saichangurvel davidsoni
              - - †Temujinia ellisoni
                - †Ctenomastax parva
          - Silvaiguana
            - Hoplocercidae
              - Enyalioides
              - - Morunasaurus
                - Hoplocercus
            - Polychrotidae
              - - Polychrus gutturosus
                - - Polychrus marmoratus
                  - - Polychrus femoralis
                    - †Afairiguana avius
              - - - Leiosaurus
                  - - Anisolepis
                    - - Enyalius
                      - Pristidactylus
                - - †Anolis electrum
                  - - Anolis occultus
                    - - Anolis heterodermus
                      - Anolis vermiculatus
        - Euiguana
          - Corytophanidae
            - Laemanctus
            - - Basiliscus
              - Corytophanes
          - Terraiguana
            - - Iguanidae
              - Crotaphytidae
                - Crotaphytus
                - Gambelia
            - - Phrynosomatidae
                - Phrynosoma
                - - Uta
                  - - - Petrosaurus
                    - - Sceloporus
                      - Urosaurus
              - - Opluridae
                  - Chalarodon madagascariensis
                  - - Oplurus quadrimaculatus B
                    - - Oplurus quadrimaculatus A
                      - Oplurus cyclurus
                - - †Uquiasaurus
                  - - Liolaemidae
                      - Phymaturus
                      - - Ctenoblepharys
                        - Liolaemus
                    - - Leiocephalus
                      - Tropiduridae
                        - Stenocercus
                        - - Tropidurus
                          - Uranoscodon

The extinct Arretosauridae (Paleogene iguanians from Central Asia) are alternatively classified in either the Acrodonta with other Old World iguanians, or in Pleurodonta as a sister group to the Crotaphytidae.

== Conservation status ==
As of 2020 The IUCN Red List of threatened species lists 63.3% of the species as Least concern, 6.7% Near Threatened, 8.2 vulnerable, 9.1% endangered, 3.1% critically endangered, 0.3 extinct and 9.2% data deficient. The major threats include agriculture, residential and commercial development.
