= Pristiguana =

Pristiguana Temporal range: Maastrichtian ~70.6–66.0 Ma

Scientific classification
- Kingdom: Animalia
- Phylum: Chordata
- Class: Reptilia
- Order: Squamata
- Genus: †Pristiguana
- Species: †P. brasiliensis

Binomial name
- †Pristiguana brasiliensis Estes & Price 1973

Extinct genus of lizards

Pristiguana is an extinct genus of possible iguanian lizard from the Maastrichtian Marília Formation of Brazil. The type species is P. brasiliensis.

== Description ==
Pristiguana was discovered in the Bauru Group of Brazil. Its discoverers said, in 1973, that it is originally considered as the oldest fossil lizard in the family Iguanidae. It resembles living primitive South American iguanids in some features, and shares some features with teiids. However, in 2012 study, phylogenic analysis found that it was a primitive iguanian forming a clade with Huehuecuetzpalli (which is considered as stem-squamate in more recent studies). Later studies questioned its pleurodontan and iguanian affinity. The specimen is apparently lost.
