= Hoyalacerta =

Hoyalacerta Temporal range: Early Cretaceous

Scientific classification
- Kingdom: Animalia
- Phylum: Chordata
- Class: Reptilia
- Order: Squamata
- Suborder: Iguania (?)
- Genus: †Hoyalacerta; Evans and Barbadillo, 1999
- Species: †H. sanzi

Binomial name
- †Hoyalacerta sanzi Evans and Barbadillo, 1999

Extinct genus of lizards

Hoyalacerta is an extinct genus of lizard known from the type species Hoyalacerta sanzi, which is from the Early Cretaceous Las Hoyas fossil site in Spain. Hoyalacerta was named in 1999 and is considered either a member of the group Iguania or a stem squamate, meaning that it lies outside the squamate crown group that includes all living lizards and snakes. Hoyalacerta is a small lizard with an elongated body and short limbs. It is thought to have spent most of its time on the ground. Several other lizards are also known from Las Hoyas, including Meyasaurus (thought to have lived near the water), Scandensia (thought to be a climber), and Jucaraseps (which, like Hoyalacerta, probably lived on the ground away from water). Features of Hoyalacerta that distinguish it from other Las Hoyas lizards include smooth skull bones, simple cone-shaped teeth, and short limbs relative to body length.
