= Isodontosaurus =

Isodontosaurus Temporal range: Late Cretaceous, 84.9–70.6 Ma

Scientific classification
- Domain: Eukaryota
- Kingdom: Animalia
- Phylum: Chordata
- Class: Reptilia
- Order: Squamata
- Suborder: Iguania
- Clade: †Gobiguania
- Genus: †Isodontosaurus; Gilmore, 1943

Type species
- †Isodontosaurus gracilis Gilmore, 1943

Extinct genus of lizards

Isodontosaurus is an extinct genus of iguanian lizard from the Late Cretaceous of Mongolia and China. The type species is Isodontosaurus gracilis. Isodontosaurus is part of an extinct group of Late Cretaceous iguanians called Gobiguania, which is currently thought to be endemic to Mongolia.
