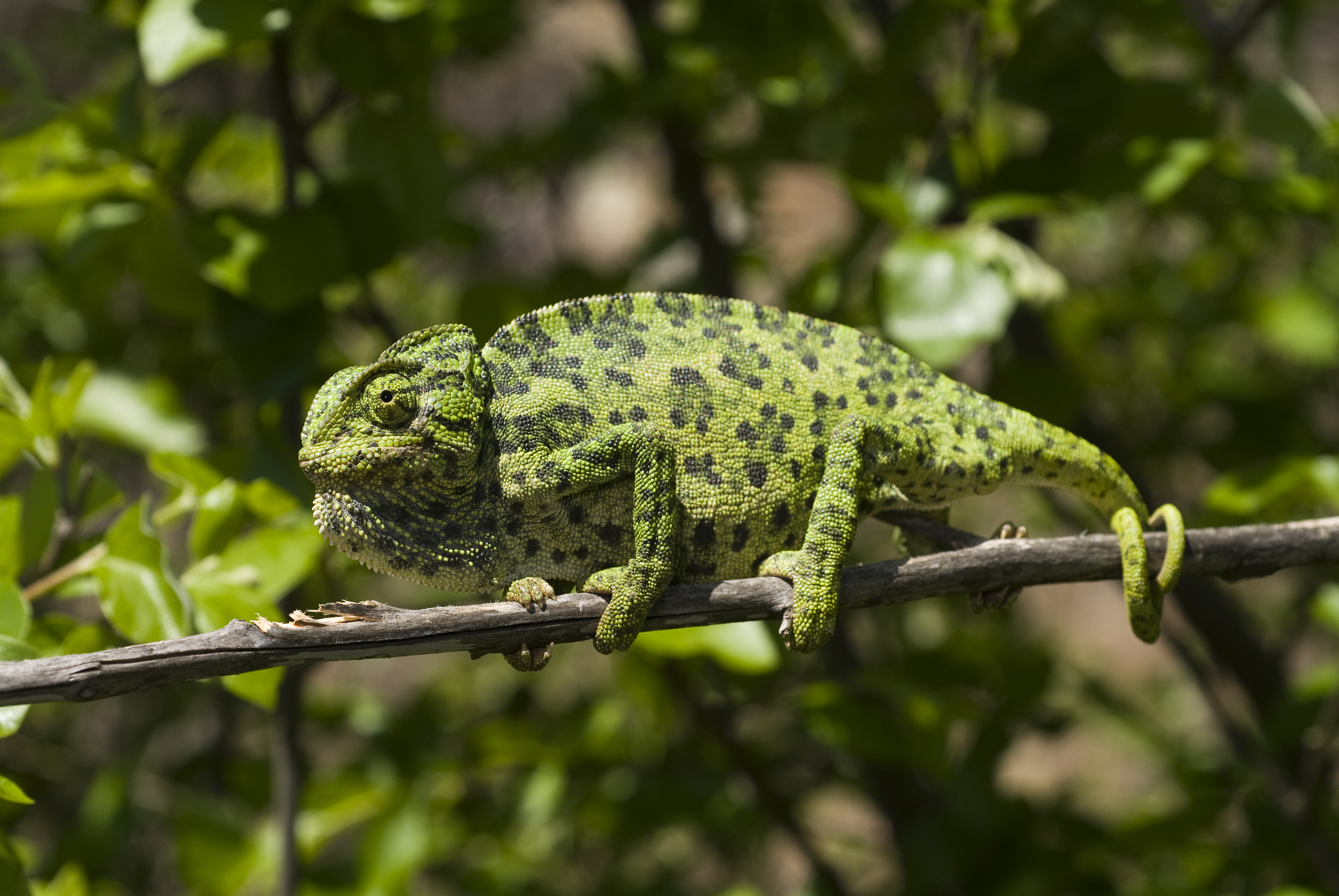
- Common chameleon, Chamaeleo chamaeleon
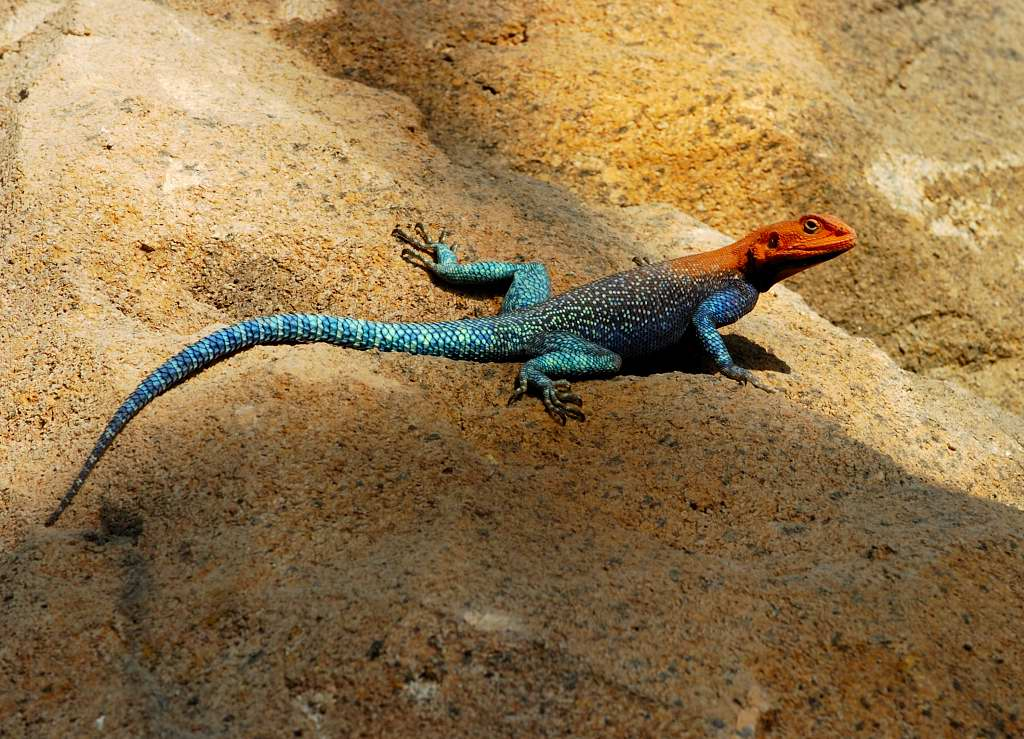
- Common agama, Agama agama

Scientific classification
- Kingdom: Animalia
- Phylum: Chordata
- Class: Reptilia
- Order: Squamata
- Suborder: Iguania
- Infraorder: Acrodonta; Cope, 1864

Subclades
- †Bharatagama?; †Gueragama; Chamaeleonidae; Agamidae

= Acrodonta (lizard) =

Acrodonta Temporal range: Early Cretaceous- present, 125–0 Ma

Subclade of lizards

Acrodonta are a subclade of iguanian squamates consisting almost entirely of Old world taxa. Extant representation include the families Chamaeleonidae (chameleons) and Agamidae (dragon lizards), with at least over 500 species described. Two fossil genera, Gueragama and Bharatagama, were found in Brazil, making them the only known American representatives of the group. However, doubt has since been cast on the placement of each of these within Acrodonta.

The group is eponymously named from their acrodont dentition, whereby the teeth are consolidated with the summit of the alveolar ridge of the jaw without sockets. There are, however, other animals that have acrodont dentition such as tuataras.

== Systematics ==
Usually acrodonts are divided into two families Chamaeleonidae and Agamidae, there are a few studies that suggest chameleons are nested within Agamidae. In order to maintain the familial status of Chamaeleonidae some authors suggested placing the clades Uromastycinae and Leiolepidinae in a third family Leiolepididae. However a majority of papers concerning acrodont phylogenetics support the traditional dichotomy of the group.

Below is the phylogeny of the acrodont lineages after Pyron et al. (2013):

- Acrodonta
  - Chamaeleonidae (chameleons)
    - Brookesiinae (leaf chameleons)
    - Chamaeleoninae (greater chameleons)
  - Agamidae (dragon lizards)
    - Uromastycinae (mastigures)
    - - Leiolepidinae (butterfly dragons)
      - - Hydrosaurinae (sailfin dragons)
        - - Amphibolurinae (Australasian dragons)
          - - Draconinae (Asian dragons)
            - Agaminae (Afro-Eurasian dragons)

The extinct Arretosauridae (Paleogene iguanians from Central Asia) are also sometimes classified in Acrodonta. However, other studies instead suggest it to be a sister group to the Crotaphytidae in Pleurodonta.
