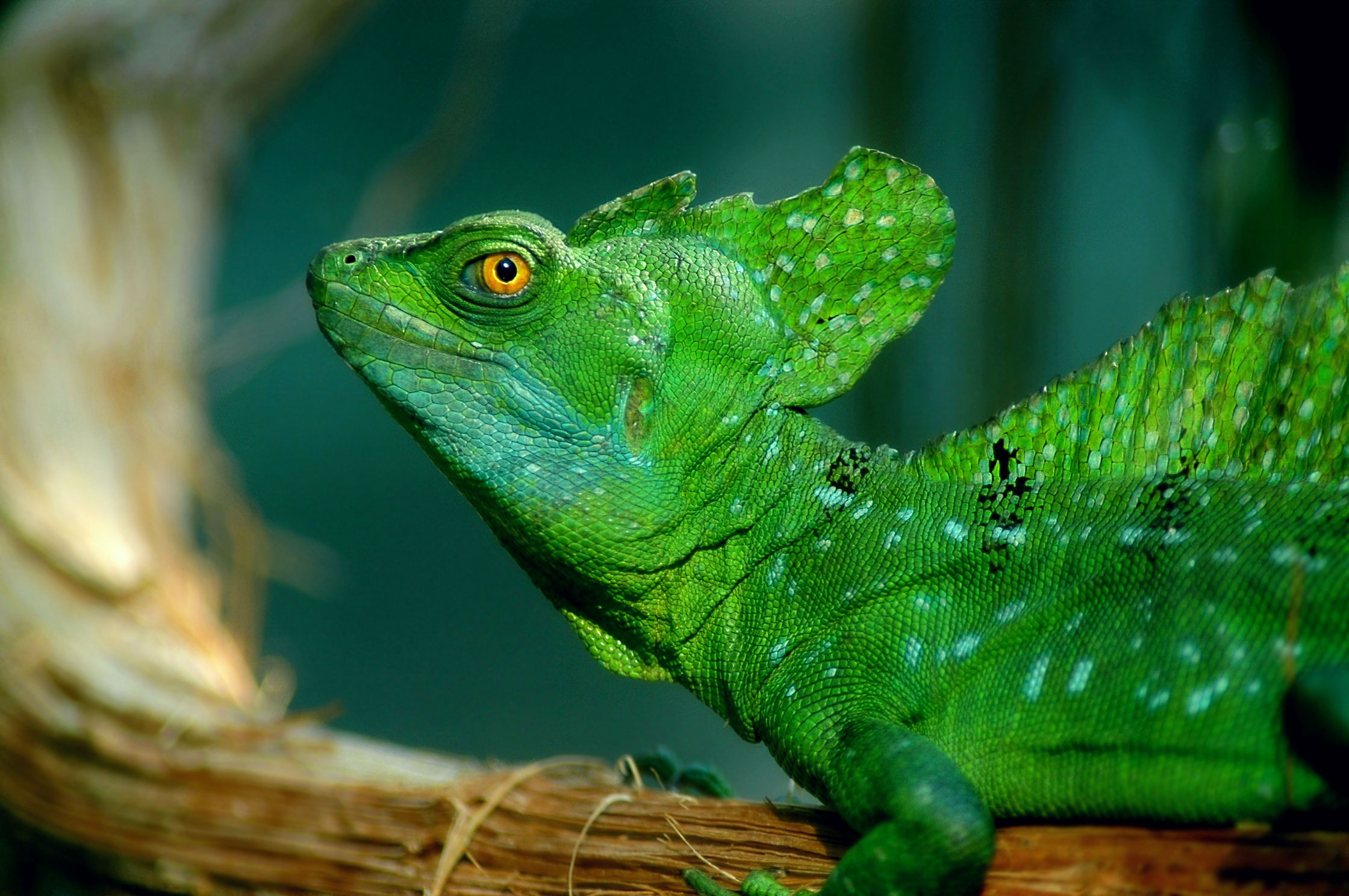
- Plumed basilisk (Basiliscus plumifrons)

Scientific classification
- Kingdom: Animalia
- Phylum: Chordata
- Class: Reptilia
- Order: Squamata
- Suborder: Iguania
- Infraorder: Pleurodonta; Cope, 1864

Subgroups
- †Gobiguania; Leiocephalidae; Iguanidae; Hoplocercidae; Crotaphytidae; Corytophanidae; Tropiduridae; Phrynosomatidae; Anolidae; Polychrotidae; Liolaemidae; Leiosauridae; Opluridae

= Pleurodonta =

Clade of lizards

Pleurodonta (from Greek lateral teeth, is a infraorder of lizards reference to the position of the teeth on the jaw) is one of the two subdivisions of Iguania, the other being Acrodonta (teeth on the top [of the jaw]). Pleurodonta includes all families previously split from Iguanidae sensu lato (Corytophanidae, Crotaphytidae, Hoplocercidae, Opluridae, Polychrotidae, etc.), whereas Acrodonta includes Agamidae and Chamaeleonidae. The name Pleurodonta was first used by paleontologist and herpetologist Edward Drinker Cope in 1864, although he used it in a different sense than it is used today. Because of this difference, the name Iguanoidea has been proposed as a replacement for Pleurodonta in phylogenetic nomenclature.

Pleurodonta is also a synonym of gastropod genus Pleurodonte.
