= Giant ameiva =

There are three species of lizard named giant ameiva:

- Ameiva ameiva
- Ameiva atrigularis
- Ameiva praesignis
