= Amazon racerunner =

There are three species of lizard named Amazon racerunner:

- Ameiva ameiva
- Ameiva atrigularis
- Ameiva praesignis
