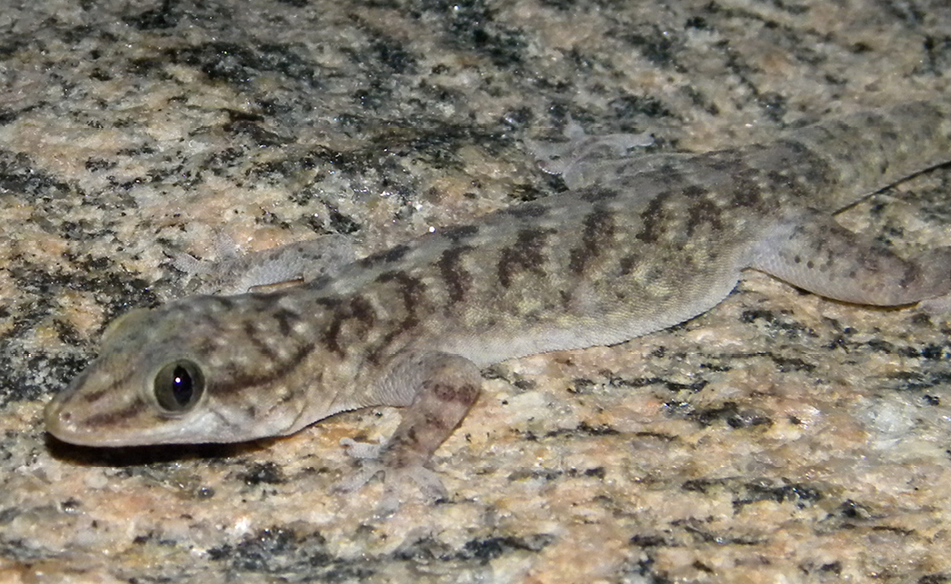
- Phyllopezus pollicaris

Scientific classification
- Kingdom: Animalia
- Phylum: Chordata
- Class: Reptilia
- Order: Squamata
- Suborder: Gekkota
- Family: Phyllodactylidae
- Genus: Phyllopezus; W. Peters, 1877

= Phyllopezus =

Genus of lizards

Phyllopezus is a genus of South American geckos, lizards in the family Phyllodactylidae. The genus contains eight described species.

== Habitat ==
Phyllopezus species occur in a variety of open and forested habitats across South America including Caatinga, Cerrado, Chaco, seasonally dry tropical forest, and Atlantic Forest.

== Species and geographic ranges ==
The following species are recognized as being valid.

- Phyllopezus diamantino Dubeux, Goncalves, Palmeira, Nunes, Cassimiro, Gamble, Werneck, Rodrigues, & Mott, 2022
- Phyllopezus heuteri Cacciali, Lotzkat, Gamble & G. Köhler, 2018 – Heuter's gecko – Paraguay
- Phyllopezus lutzae (Loveridge, 1941) – Lutz's gecko, Bogert's gecko, Lutz' marked gecko – Brazil
- Phyllopezus maranjonensis Koch, Venegas & Böhme, 2006 – Peru
- Phyllopezus periosus Rodrigues, 1986 – Paraíba gecko, Peraiba gecko – Brazil
- Phyllopezus pollicaris (Spix, 1825) – Brazilian gecko – Argentina, Bolivia, Brazil
- Phyllopezus przewalskii Koslowsky, 1895 – Przewalsky's gecko – Argentina, Bolivia, Brazil, Paraguay
- Phyllopezus selmae Dubeux, Goncalves, Palmeira, Nunes, Cassimiro, Gamble, Werneck, Rodrigues, & Mott, 2022

Nota bene: An binomial authority in parentheses indicates that the species was originally described in a genus other than Phyllopezus.
