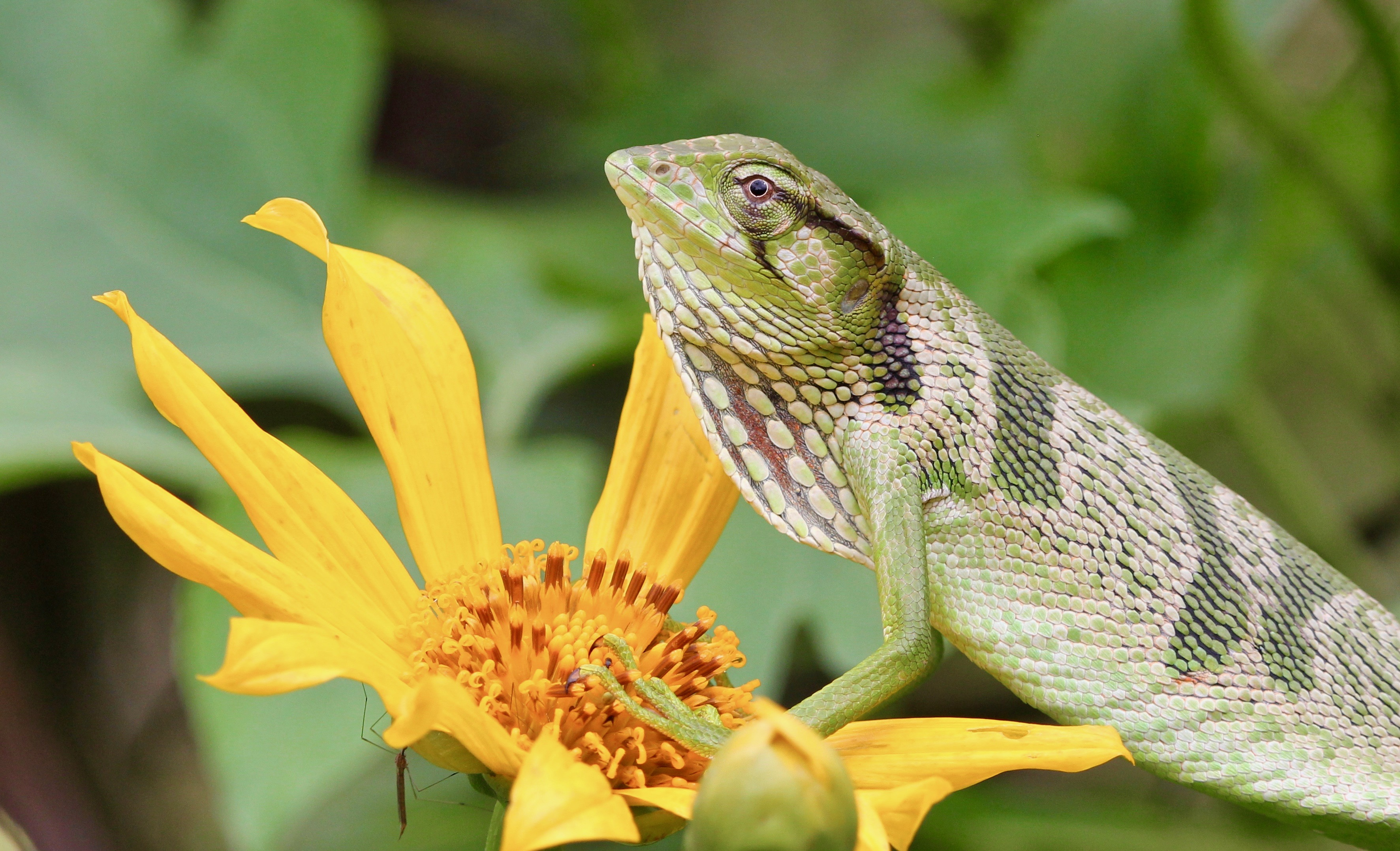

Conservation status
- Least Concern (IUCN 3.1)

Scientific classification
- Kingdom: Animalia
- Phylum: Chordata
- Class: Reptilia
- Order: Squamata
- Suborder: Iguania
- Family: Polychrotidae
- Genus: Polychrus
- Species: P. gutturosus

Binomial name
- Polychrus gutturosus Berthold, 1845

Synonyms
- Polychrus (Chaunolaemus) multicarinatus; Polychrus spurrelli; Polychrus gutturosus spurrelli

= Polychrus gutturosus =

Species of lizard

Polychrus gutturosus, also known as Berthold's bush anole or monkey tailed anole, is a species of lizard found in tropical Central and South America. It is sometimes referred to as a "forest iguana". It lives in forests and jungles from Honduras to Ecuador. It can reach up to 70 cm (2.3 ft) in total length, including its very long tail, and males are considerably smaller than females. This insectivorous lizard is a climbing species that can often be seen holding onto branches. It can even hold on with its hind legs, though it moves slowly that way.

Genus Polychrus is often classified in the family, Polychrotidae, but some prefer to treat it as a subfamily, Polychrotinae, under the family Iguanidae.
