= Polychrus femoralis =

Conservation status
- Least Concern (IUCN 3.1)

Scientific classification
- Domain: Eukaryota
- Kingdom: Animalia
- Phylum: Chordata
- Class: Reptilia
- Order: Squamata
- Suborder: Iguania
- Family: Polychrotidae
- Genus: Polychrus
- Species: P. femoralis

Binomial name
- Polychrus femoralis Werner, 1910

Species of lizard

Polychrus femoralis, or Werner's bush anole, is a species of anole native to Ecuador and Peru. It can be found in forests and shrublands.
