= Polychrus auduboni =

Scientific classification
- Domain: Eukaryota
- Kingdom: Animalia
- Phylum: Chordata
- Class: Reptilia
- Order: Squamata
- Suborder: Iguania
- Family: Polychrotidae
- Genus: Polychrus
- Species: P. auduboni

Binomial name
- Polychrus auduboni Hallowell, 1845

Species of lizard

Polychrus auduboni, or smooth-backed bush anole, common monkey lizard, or many-colored bush anole, is a species of anole native to Venezuela and Trinidad and Tobago. It can be found in forests and shrublands.
