= Polychrus jacquelinae =

Conservation status
- Data Deficient (IUCN 3.1)

Scientific classification
- Kingdom: Animalia
- Phylum: Chordata
- Class: Reptilia
- Order: Squamata
- Suborder: Iguania
- Family: Polychrotidae
- Genus: Polychrus
- Species: P. jacquelinae

Binomial name
- Polychrus jacquelinae Koch, Venegas, Garcia-Bravo and Böhme, 2011

Species of lizard

Polychrus jacquelinae or Jacqueline's bush anole is a species of bush anole. It is endemic to Peru and was dedicated to Jacqueline Maria Charles. It can be found in elevations of 1,460 to 1,570 meters.
