= Polychrus peruvianus =

Conservation status
- Vulnerable (IUCN 3.1)

Scientific classification
- Domain: Eukaryota
- Kingdom: Animalia
- Phylum: Chordata
- Class: Reptilia
- Order: Squamata
- Suborder: Iguania
- Family: Polychrotidae
- Genus: Polychrus
- Species: P. peruvianus

Binomial name
- Polychrus peruvianus (Noble, 1924)

Species of reptile

Polychrus peruvianus, the Peruvian bush anole, is a species of bush anole native to Peru and Ecuador. It was initially placed in the genus, Polychroides, before being corrected in 1965.

== Description ==
Polychrus peruvianus have a maximum length of 152 millimeters. Males are larger than females. A dorsal or gular crest is present on individuals.
