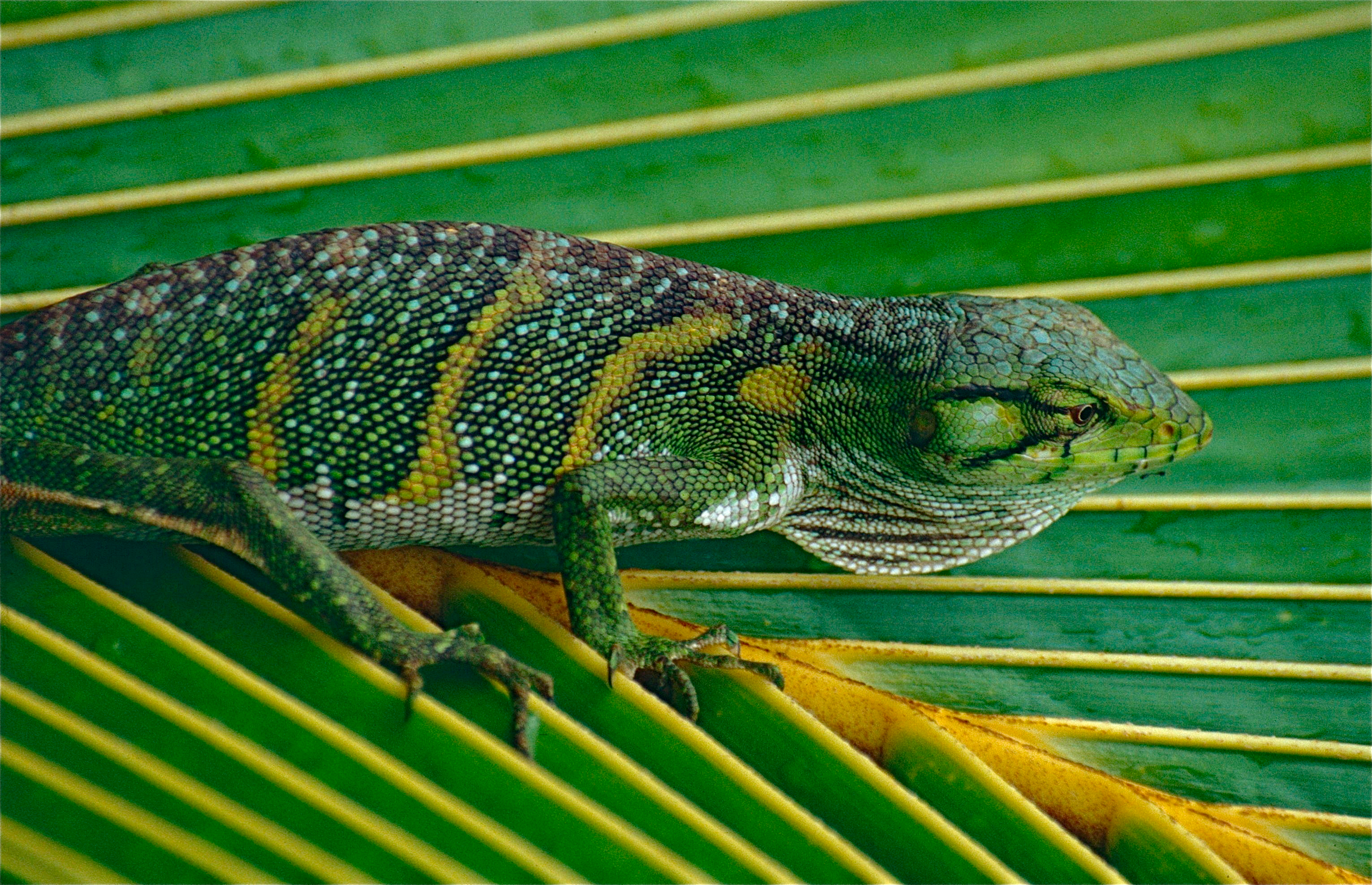
- Polychrus marmoratus in Guyana
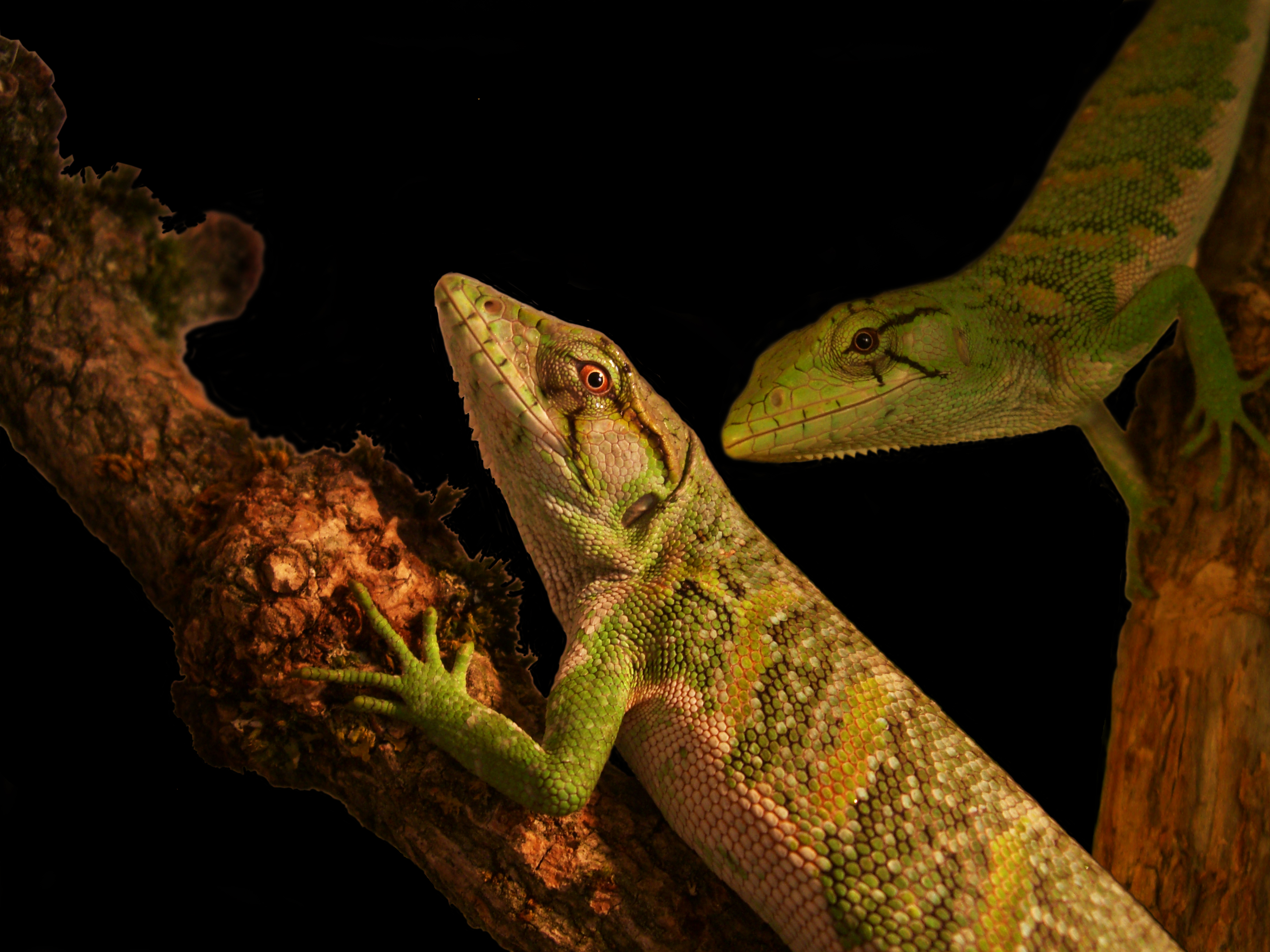

Conservation status
- Least Concern (IUCN 3.1)

Scientific classification
- Kingdom: Animalia
- Phylum: Chordata
- Class: Reptilia
- Order: Squamata
- Suborder: Iguania
- Family: Polychrotidae
- Genus: Polychrus
- Species: P. marmoratus

Binomial name
- Polychrus marmoratus Linnaeus, 1758

= Polychrus marmoratus =

Species of lizard

Polychrus marmoratus or many-colored bush anole is a species of bush anole. It is also commonly referred to as the monkey lizard due to its slow movement. The lizard has many predators, including spiders and primates.

== Description ==
Polychrus marmoratus weighs 101.19 grams. The lizard is 30 to 50 centimeters long. It has a blunt snout with large and smooth scales on the dorsal surface of the head. The scales on the flank and skin are smaller. The lizard is commonly brown or olive-grey. Blue or black spots may be present on the head. The neck is bluish, while the ventral region is whitish. Five or six "V-shaped bands" are present on the back.

The lizard hunts insects and spiders using an ambush method. It will also feed on flowers and seeds. The lizard inhabits semi-deciduous forests.

== Distribution ==
The species is present in Guyana, Brazil, Peru, and Ecuador. The species has also been sighted in Trinidad and Tobago, Venezuela, and Florida.
