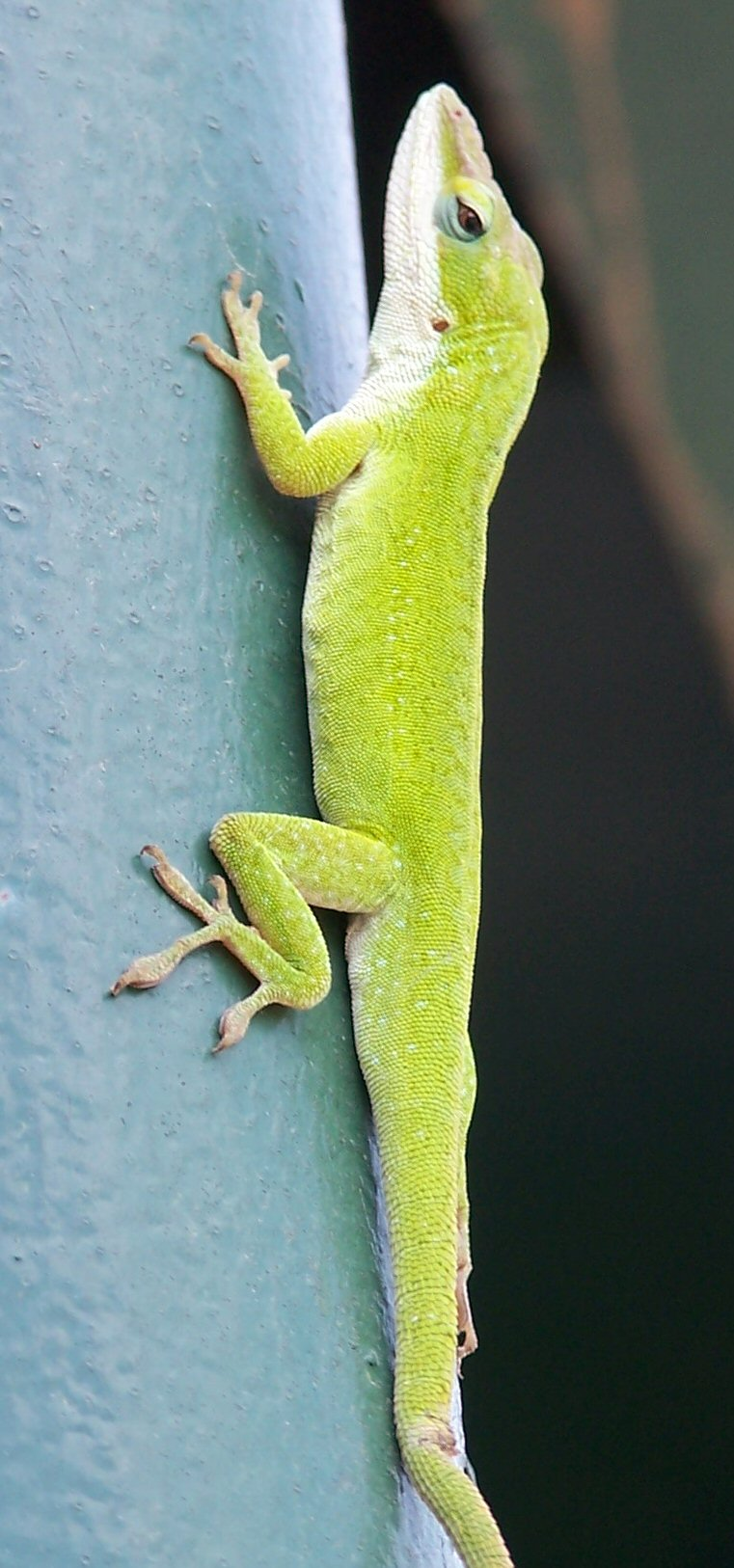
- Green anole (Anolis carolinensis)

Scientific classification
- Kingdom: Animalia
- Phylum: Chordata
- Class: Reptilia
- Order: Squamata
- Suborder: Iguania
- Family: Anolidae
- Genus: Anolis; Daudin, 1802

Type species
- Anolis punctatus Daudin, 1802

Species
- circa 425 spp., see text

= Anolis =

Anolis Temporal range: Early Miocene–present

Genus of lizards

Anolis is a genus of anoles, iguanian lizards in the family Anolidae, native to the Americas. With more than 425 species, it represents the world's most species-rich amniote tetrapod genus, although many of these have been proposed to be moved to other genera, in which case only about 45 Anolis species remain. Previously, it was classified under the family Polychrotidae that contained all the anoles, as well as Polychrus, but recent studies place it in the Dactyloidae.

== Taxonomy ==
This very large genus displays considerable paraphyly, but phylogenetic analysis suggests a number of subgroups or clades. Whether these clades are best recognized as subgenera within Anolis or separate genera remains a matter of dispute.

If the clades are recognized as full genera, about 45 species remain in Anolis, with the remaining moved to Audantia (9 species), Chamaelinorops (7 species), Ctenonotus (more than 40 species), Dactyloa (circa 95 species), Deiroptyx (almost 35 species), Norops (about 190 species), and Xiphosurus (around 15 species). Some of these can be further subdivided. For example, Phenacosaurus was often listed as a full genus in the past, but it is a subclade within Dactyloa (Dactyloa heteroderma species group). Among the subgroups within Anolis are:

- carolinensis species group (13 species)
- isolepis species group (three species)

In 2011, the green (or Carolina) anole (Anolis carolinensis) became the first reptile to have its complete genome published.

Closely related, recently diverged anole lizards exhibited more divergence in thermal biology than in morphology. These anole lizards are thought to have the same structural niche and have similarities in their size and shape, but they inhabit different climatic niches with variability in temperature and openness of the environment. This suggests that thermal physiology is more associated with recently diverged anole lizards.

== Ecomorphs ==
Anolis lizards are some of the best examples of both adaptive radiation and convergent evolution. Populations of lizards on isolated islands diverge to occupy separate ecological niches, mostly in terms of the location within the vegetation where they forage (such as in the crown of trees vs. the trunk vs. underlying shrubs). These divergences in habitat are accompanied by morphological changes primarily related to moving on the substrate diameter they most frequently encounter, with twig ecomorphs having short limbs, while trunk ecomorphs have long limbs.

In addition, these patterns repeat on numerous islands, with animals in similar habitats converging on similar body forms repeatedly. This demonstrates adaptive radiation can actually be predictable based on habitat encountered, and experimental introductions onto formerly lizard-free islands have proven Anolis evolution can be predicted.

After appearing on each of the four Greater Antillean Islands about 50 million years ago, Anolis lizards spread on each island to occupy niches in the island's trees. Some living in the tree canopy area, others low on the tree trunk near the ground; others in the mid-trunk area, others on twigs. Each new species developed its own distinct body type, called an ecomorph, adapted to the tree niche where it lived. Together, the different species occupied their various niches in the trees as a "community". A study of lizard fossils trapped in amber shows that the lizard communities have existed for about 20 million years or more. Four modern ecomorph body types, trunk-crown, trunk-ground, trunk, and twig, are represented in the amber fossils study. Close comparison of the lizard fossils with their descendants alive today in the Caribbean shows the lizards have changed little in the millions of years.

== Behavior ==
As ectotherms, Anolis lizards must regulate their body temperature partly through behavioral changes and bask in the sunlight to gain enough heat to become fully active, but lizards cannot behaviorally warm themselves at night when temperatures drop. Because of this, cold tolerance evolves faster than heat tolerance in these lizards. On the island of Hispaniola, both high-altitude and low-altitude lizard populations exist, and the thermal conditions at high and low elevations differ significantly. High-altitude lizards have shifted their ecological niche to boulder environments, where warming themselves is easier, and they show changes in the shape of limbs and skull that make them better adapted to these environments.

To escape dangers, species that evolved near water have adapted the ability to stay submerged for as long as 18 minutes.

== Species ==
The Anolis lizards that are less susceptible to predation are those with a dewlap in which both the scales and the exposed skin areas between them match the usual pale gray or whitish of the rest of the ventral surface.

== Dewlap ==
The dewlap is a flap of skin found beneath the jaw or throat of Anolis lizards. It can present in a variety of colorations, and is most present in male anoles. The dewlap is extended by means of the hyoid muscles in the throat, and can be flashed in a "pulse" pattern where the flap is extended repeatedly, or a "moving flag" pattern, where the lizard flashes it continuously while bobbing up and down. The coloration of the dewlap is caused by two pigments, pterins and carotenoids. Pterin pigments are compounds synthesized from guanine, whereas carotenoids are pigments acquired from the diet. Both cause the red-yellow hues most commonly found in Anolis lizard dewlaps. The function of the dewlap in Anolis lizards has been a topic of debate for centuries. It is thought that the dewlap is flashed as a visual signal for other competing males, or as a courtship signal for single females. It has also been hypothesized that the dewlap serves as a signal for sex recognition.

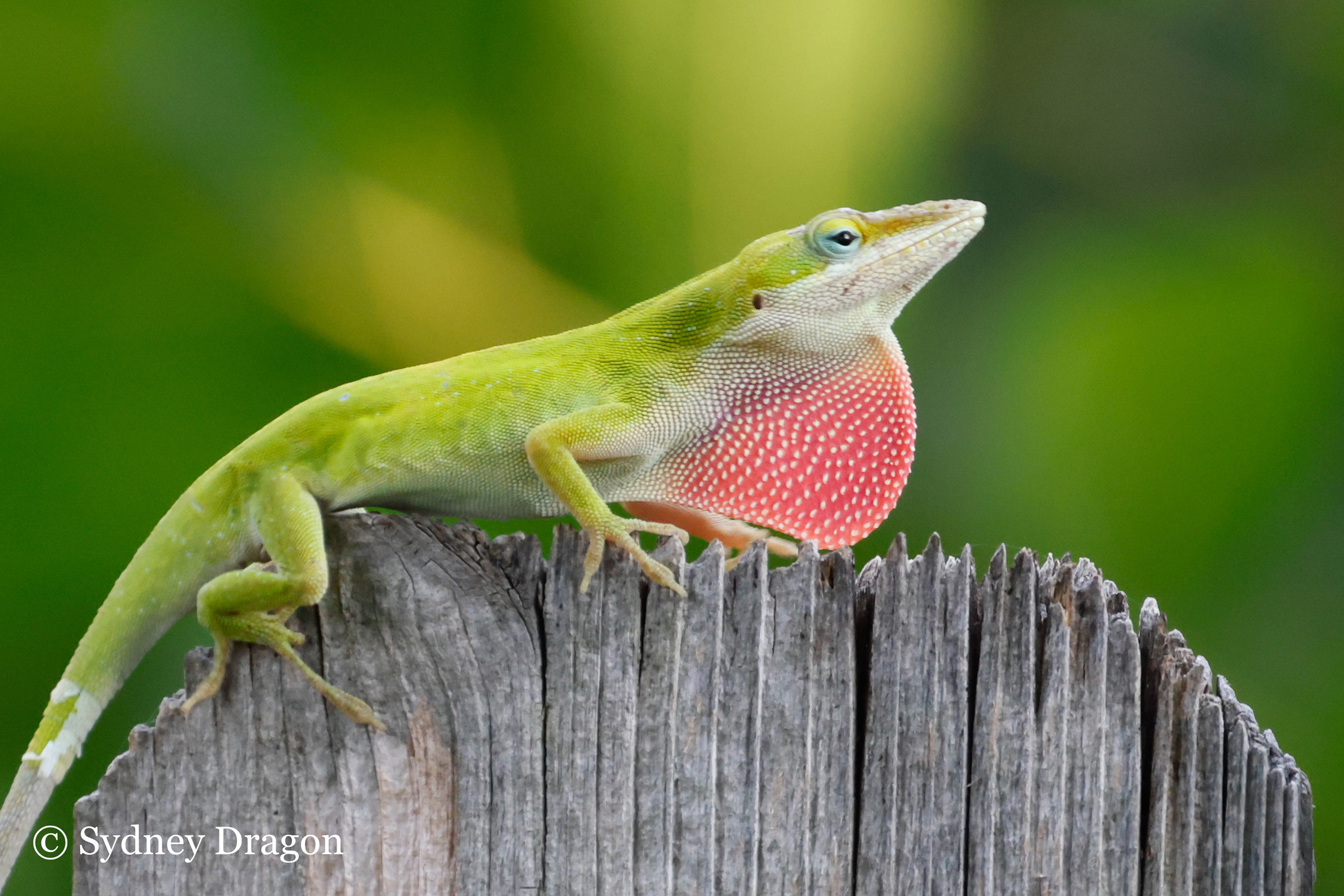
Pink dewlap on an Anolis carolinensis lizard

=== Initial studies ===
The first study done on dewlap function was by Mertens (1926). The initial assumption was that the dewlap was flashed as a method of sexual selection, and that the males would use it in order to attract females. It is hypothesized that female Anolis lizards are more attracted to males who flash their dewlaps more often, or have more brightly colored dewlaps. This was then challenged by the hypothesis that males flashed their dewlap as a way to threaten other males in the area. During intermale fights, dewlaps are flashed. More currently, many studies have been done on the dewlap as a function for species recognition, with focus on the relationship of the contrast between dewlap color and environment.

=== Relationship with environment ===
The dewlap comes in a variety of colors, including yellow, blue, and red. It was previously believed that the color of the dewlap is what mattered most in interlizard interactions, but it has since been found that there exists a relationship between habitat light conditions and dewlap color. This means that, rather than the color being of importance, it is the contrast of the dewlap against the background of its environment that best visually signals to other lizards. There have been many methods used to determine this. Persons et al. (1999) found that the probability of a dewlap showing being detected goes up with the contrast of dewlap against the background. They determined this by measuring the number of times a "positive response" of the lizard's eyes turning towards a flashed dewlap occurred among different background contrasts. Similarly, Leal and Fleishman (2002) found that the light conditions in which a lizard displays its dewlap affects the probability of it being visually detected. They did this by measuring the UV spectral reflectance of dewlaps in Anolis cristatellus lizards using a spectroradiometer, then measuring the spectral sensitivity of the lizards' retinal responses using electroretinographic (ERG) flicker photometry.

=== Evolution ===
Anolis lizards have emerged to be a good example of adaptive radiation. The difference in dewlap morphology among Anolis lizard populations demonstrates this phenomenon. Anolis lizards have the ability to adapt to different areas of the environment in a way where multiple species can coexist effectively. The amount of vegetation in an environment affects the amount of light absorbed. Studies have shown that lighting affects the dewlap's function as a visual signal. The diversity in vegetation in Anolis lizards' environments has caused a similar diversity in dewlap morphology, as different species of anoles adapt to the lighting conditions in their environment. The ability for a lizard to signal effectively also means it is able to defend its territory and attract mates more effectively, making it a good competitor.

The relationship between background contrast and visual signals also suggests that there exists a coevolution between the signals and sensory systems of Anolis lizards. The environmental diversity of Anolis habitats causes a diversity in the recognition of individuals. Sensory systems must be able to effectively pick up on dewlap signals, thus coevolving with the changes in dewlap characteristics.

One of the main limitations to these theories is that of gene flow. Population genetic theory says that gene flow can counteract evolutionary adaptations made and prevent signal divergence, due to an influx of abnormal alleles into the new population. This causes a genetic homogenization and challenges the idea that dewlap morphology in Anolis lizards and their sensory systems have coevolved.
