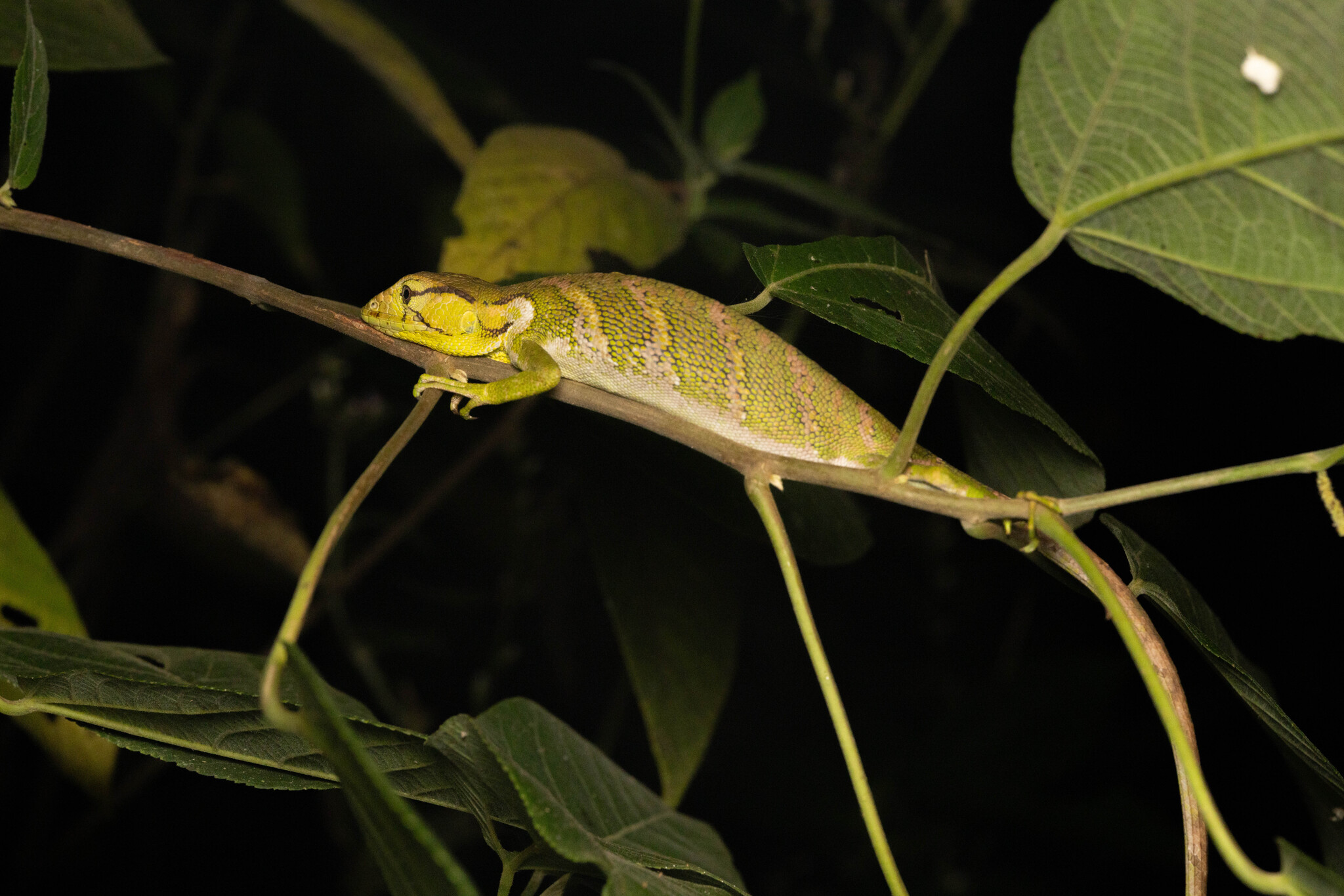

Conservation status
- Least Concern (IUCN 3.1)

Scientific classification
- Kingdom: Animalia
- Phylum: Chordata
- Class: Reptilia
- Order: Squamata
- Suborder: Iguania
- Family: Polychrotidae
- Genus: Polychrus
- Species: P. liogaster

Binomial name
- Polychrus liogaster Boulenger, 1908

= Polychrus liogaster =

Species of reptile

Polychrus liogaster or Boulenger's bush anole is a species of bush anole native to Peru, Brazil, Bolivia, and Ecuador. The species is found in elevations of around 750 meters.

== Description ==
The anole weighs 110.34 grams. The species has a blunt snout, with large and smooth scales on the head. Scales are widened and larger on the neck and around the same size on the tail; ventral scales are smooth. There is no sexual dimorphism in color and three black lines radiate from each eye. The species is arboreal and diurnal.

== Distribution ==
The species is endemic to the western portion of the Amazon rainforest. This includes along the banks and tributaries Juruá River, Purus River, Guaporé River, and the Madeira River. In Peru, Polychrus liogaster has been confirmed to be present in La Convención and Bajo Puyantimarí. In Bolivia, the species has been confirmed in Marbán, Ichilo, and Santa Cruz. The species' range in Brazil includes Amazonas, Acre, Mato Grosso, and Rondônia.
