= Phyllopezus selmae =

Scientific classification
- Kingdom: Animalia
- Phylum: Chordata
- Class: Reptilia
- Order: Squamata
- Suborder: Gekkota
- Family: Phyllodactylidae
- Genus: Phyllopezus
- Species: P. selmae

Binomial name
- Phyllopezus selmae Dubeux, Goncalves, Palmeira, Nunes, Cassimiro, Gamble, Werneck, Rodrigues, & Mott, 2022

Species of lizard

Phyllopezus selmae is a species of gecko, a lizard in the family Phyllodactylidae. The species is endemic to northeastern Brazil.

== Etymology ==
Its scientific species name (selmae) stems from "Selma Torquato", the curator of Coleção Herpetológica do Museu de História Natural da Universidade Federal de Alagoas.

== Description ==
Its skin varies from light to beige (depending on age) with dark brown and black spots. The females are ca. 8-10 cm. (3-4 inches) from snout to vent (SVL) and males are ca. 9-10 cm. (3,5-4 inches) from snout to vent (SVL).

== Behavior and ecology ==
They are nocturnal and spend the day in hiding, which they do in tree bark and plants. They have been observed to be most active in the evening when they forage. They have been observed to mostly fourage in forested areas near rivers. They have been observed to "squeak" when defending themselves.
