= Ameiva provitaae =

Conservation status
- Endangered (IUCN 3.1)

Scientific classification
- Kingdom: Animalia
- Phylum: Chordata
- Class: Reptilia
- Order: Squamata
- Suborder: Lacertoidea
- Family: Teiidae
- Genus: Ameiva
- Species: A. provitaae

Binomial name
- Ameiva provitaae García-Pérez, 1995

Species of lizard

Ameiva provitaae is a species of teiid lizard endemic to Venezuela.
