= Echinosaura panamensis =

Conservation status
- Least Concern (IUCN 3.1)

Scientific classification
- Kingdom: Animalia
- Phylum: Chordata
- Class: Reptilia
- Order: Squamata
- Suborder: Lacertoidea
- Family: Gymnophthalmidae
- Genus: Echinosaura
- Species: E. panamensis

Binomial name
- Echinosaura panamensis Barbour, 1924

Species of lizard

Echinosaura panamensis, the Panama teiid, is a species of lizard in the family Gymnophthalmidae. It is endemic to Panama.
