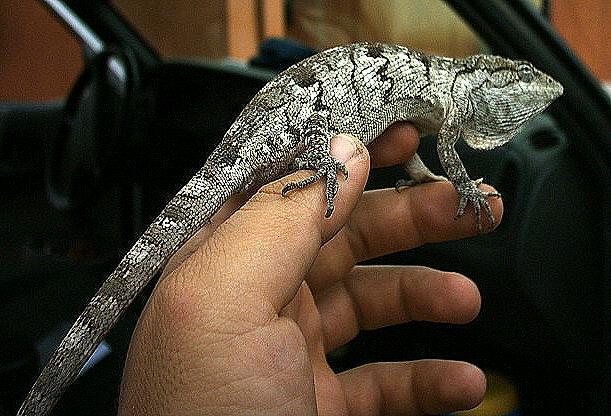
- A specimen being held

Conservation status
- Least Concern (IUCN 3.1)

Scientific classification
- Kingdom: Animalia
- Phylum: Chordata
- Class: Reptilia
- Order: Squamata
- Suborder: Iguania
- Family: Polychrotidae
- Genus: Polychrus
- Species: P. acutirostris

Binomial name
- Polychrus acutirostris Spix, 1825

= Polychrus acutirostris =

Species of lizard

Polychrus acutirostris, the Brazilian bush anole, is a species of lizard native to southern and eastern Brazil, Paraguay, Argentina, and eastern Bolivia. It is diurnal.

== Description ==
It is an oviparous animal with an arboreal habit, which inhabits a large part of South America. Its color becomes stronger during mating season, but it can also change to obtain better camouflage. Despite presenting several characteristics similar to those of "true chameleons", such as eyes that move independently and the ability to change color, the species does not belong to the same family as the Chameleon, but still has a level of kinship with the same, belonging to the same suborder: Sauria. Their diet basically consists of insects. The species is being threatened by habitat loss. With a calm temperament, it does not pose a danger to humans.

Another peculiar characteristic of the animal is the one that characterizes it by its popular name of "sloth lizard", its movements are slow, especially when compared to other reptiles that normally have agility in their locomotion. It tends to remain motionless most of the time to camouflage itself, which, along with its subtle ability to change color, is its greatest defenses. Its slow mobility, in addition to affecting its diet, makes it easy prey, possibly placing it in a group at risk of extinction.

A diurnal species, it usually lives in trees. The males of the species defend their territories. It is difficult to find, because of its ability to camouflage itself, being confused with the environment. Its reproduction is annual, females usually lay 7 to 31 eggs. To attract females, during the breeding season, males acquire a reddish color on their heads. It can be found in the Andes, from southern Pará to northern Argentina, in savanna formations.
