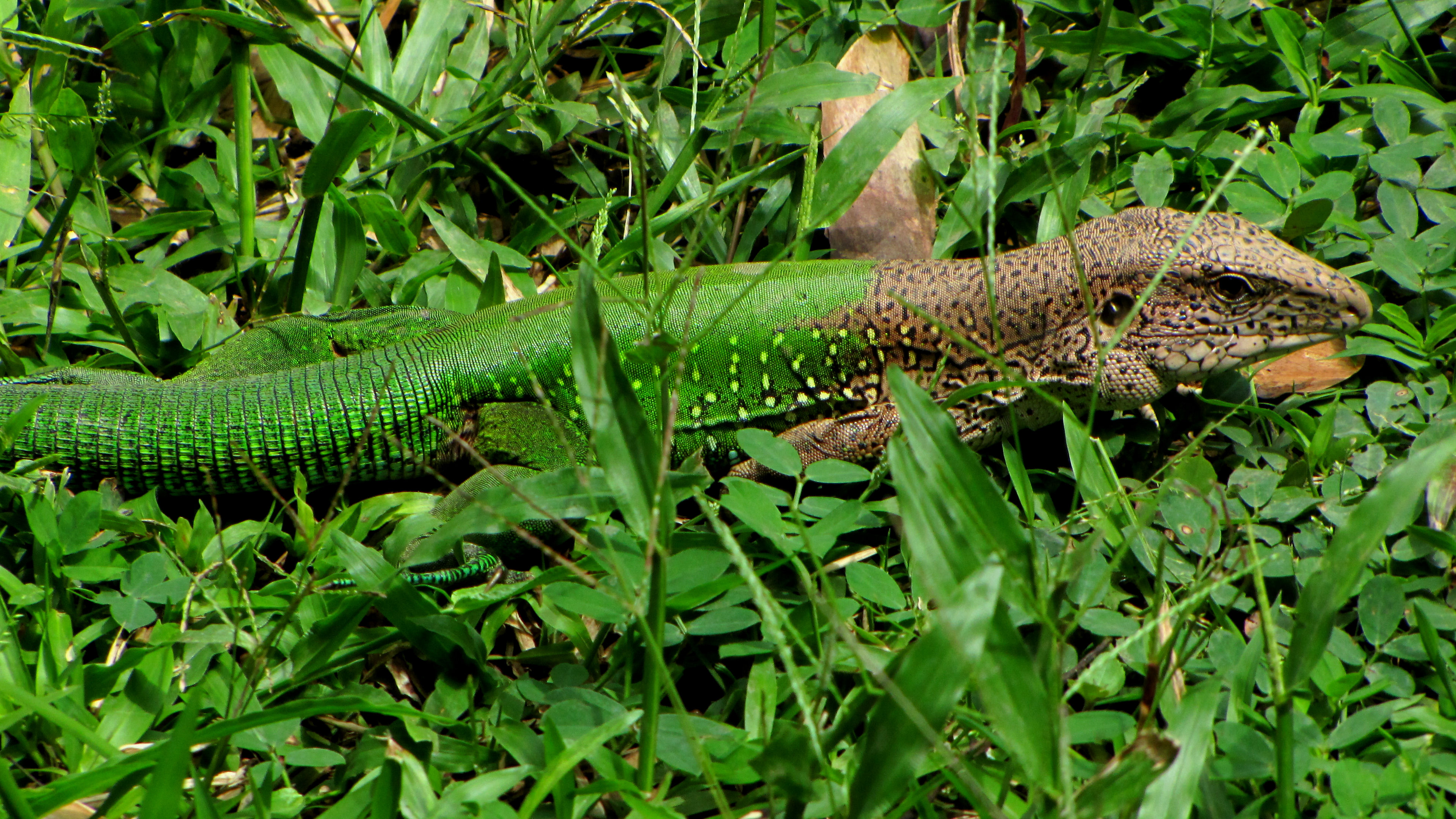
- Ameiva ameiva male

Scientific classification
- Kingdom: Animalia
- Phylum: Chordata
- Class: Reptilia
- Order: Squamata
- Family: Teiidae
- Genus: Ameiva; F. Meyer, 1795

Species
- 14, see text

= Ameiva =

Genus of lizards

Ameiva, commonly called jungle-runners, is a genus of whiptail lizards that belongs to the family Teiidae.

== Geographic range ==
Member species of the genus Ameiva are found in South America, Central America and the Caribbean (West Indies). Their major habitat in four regions of Brazil include: Caatinga, Cerrado, the Amazonian rain forest, and the Amazonian savanna. Additionally, Ameiva ameiva has been introduced to Florida in the United States.

== Species ==
Sourced from "The Reptile Database".

Image	Name	Distribution
	Ameiva aggerecusans Koch, Venegas, Rödder, Flecks & Böhme, 2013	Peru
	Ameiva ameiva (Linnaeus, 1758) – giant ameiva, green ameiva, South American ground lizard, Amazon racerunner	Central, South America, and some Caribbean Islands.
	Ameiva atrigularis (Garman, 1887) – giant ameiva, Amazon racerunner	Trinidad and Tobago and in Venezuela.
	Ameiva bifrontata Cope, 1862 – Cope's ameiva	Peru, Colombia, Venezuela, Netherlands Antilles, and Aruba.
	Ameiva concolor (Ruthven, 1924)	Peru.
	Ameiva fuliginosa (Cope, 1892)	Isla de Providencia, San Andrés, and the Swan Islands.
	Ameiva jacuba Giugliano, Nogueira, Valdujo, Collevatti & Colli, 2013	Brazil.
	Ameiva nodam Koch, Venegas, Rödder, Flecks & Böhme, 2013	Peru.
	Ameiva pantherina Ugueto & Harvey, 2011	Venezuela.
	Ameiva parecis (Colli, Costa, Garda, Kopp, Mesquita, Péres, Valdujo, Vieira & Wiederhecker, 2003)	Brazil.
	Ameiva praesignis (Baird & Girard, 1852) – giant ameiva, Amazon racerunner	Costa Rica, Panama, Venezuela, and Colombia.
	Ameiva provitaae García-Pérez, 1995	Venezuela.
	Ameiva reticulata Landauro, Garcia-Bravo & Venegas, 2015	Peru.
	Ameiva tobagana Cope, 1879 – Antillean ameiva	Grenada and St. Vincent.

Nota bene: A binomial authority in parentheses indicates that the species was originally described in a genus other than Ameiva.
