= Ameiva reticulata =

Scientific classification
- Kingdom: Animalia
- Phylum: Chordata
- Class: Reptilia
- Order: Squamata
- Family: Teiidae
- Genus: Ameiva
- Species: A. reticulata

Binomial name
- Ameiva reticulata Landauro, Garcia-Bravo, & Venegas, 2015

Species of lizard

Ameiva reticulata is a species of teiid lizard endemic to Peru.
