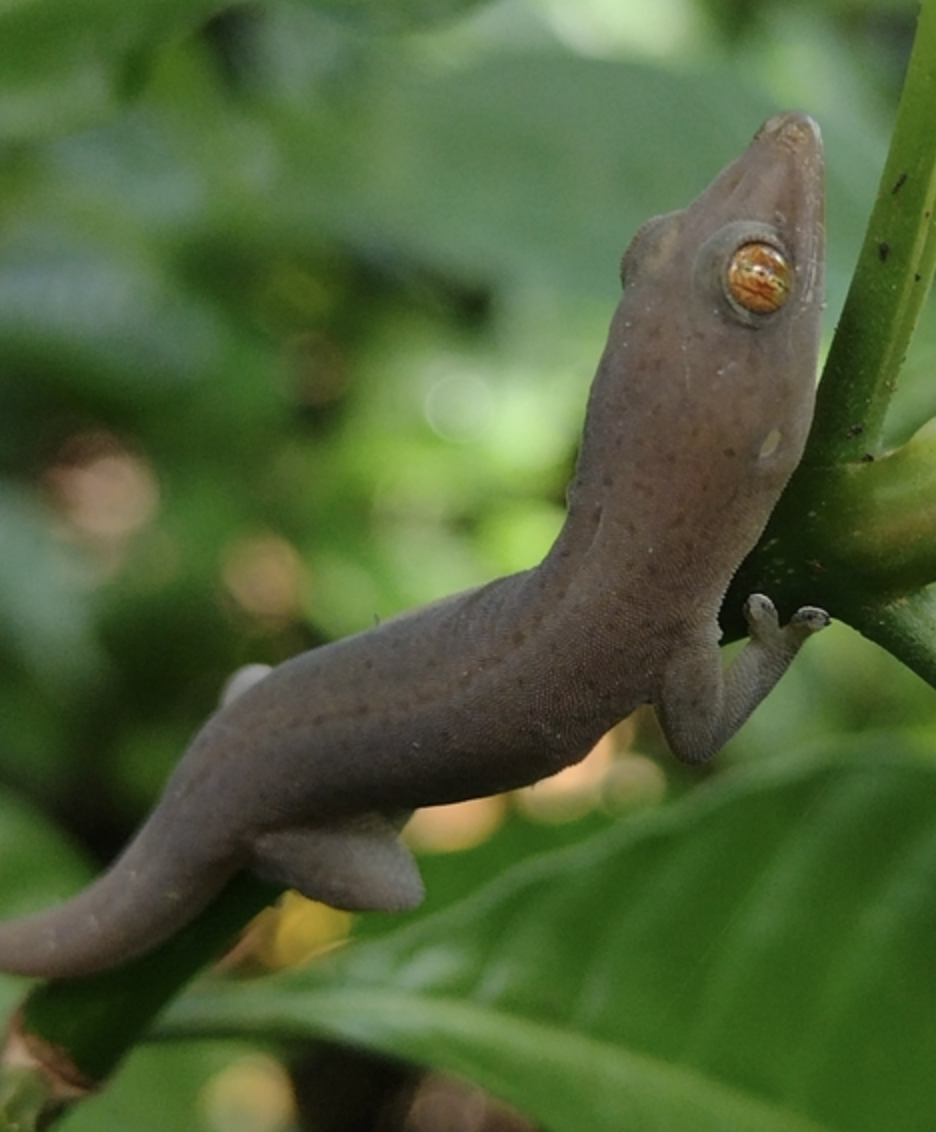
- Phyllopezus lutzae in Sergipe, Brazil

Conservation status
- Least Concern (IUCN 3.1)

Scientific classification
- Kingdom: Animalia
- Phylum: Chordata
- Class: Reptilia
- Order: Squamata
- Suborder: Gekkota
- Family: Phyllodactylidae
- Genus: Phyllopezus
- Species: P. lutzae

Binomial name
- Phyllopezus lutzae (Loveridge, 1941)

Synonyms
- Bogertia lutzae Loveridge, 1941; Phyllopezus lutzae — Gamble et al., 2012

= Lutz's gecko =

Species of lizard

Lutz's gecko (Phyllopezus lutzae), also known commonly as Bogert's gecko and Lutz' marked gecko, is a species of lizard in the family Phyllodactylidae. The species is endemic to Brazil.

== Etymology ==
The specific name, lutzae, is in honor of Brazilian herpetologist Bertha Lutz. The original generic name, Bogertia, was in honor of American herpetologist Charles Mitchill Bogert.

== Geographic range ==
Phyllopezus lutzae is found in northeastern Brazil, in the Brazilian states of Bahia, Paraíba, and Pernambuco.

== Habitat ==
The preferred natural habitat of Phyllopezus lutzae is forest.

== Behavior ==
Phyllopezus lutzae is terrestrial, and it is both diurnal and nocturnal.

== Defensive behavior ==
If threatened, Phyllopezus lutzae may vocalize, and it may shed its tail (autotomy).

== Diet ==
Phyllopezus lutzae preys upon arthropods, mainly spiders and beetles. Its diet varies ontogenetically and seasonally.

== Reproduction ==
Phyllopezus lutzae is oviparous.

== Taxonomy ==
This species was originally described as Bogertia lutzae by Loveridge (1941). Based on DNA analysis, Gamble et al. (2012) placed the species Bogertia lutzae in the genus Phyllopezus as Phyllopezus lutzae, along with three other described species and several undescribed species.
