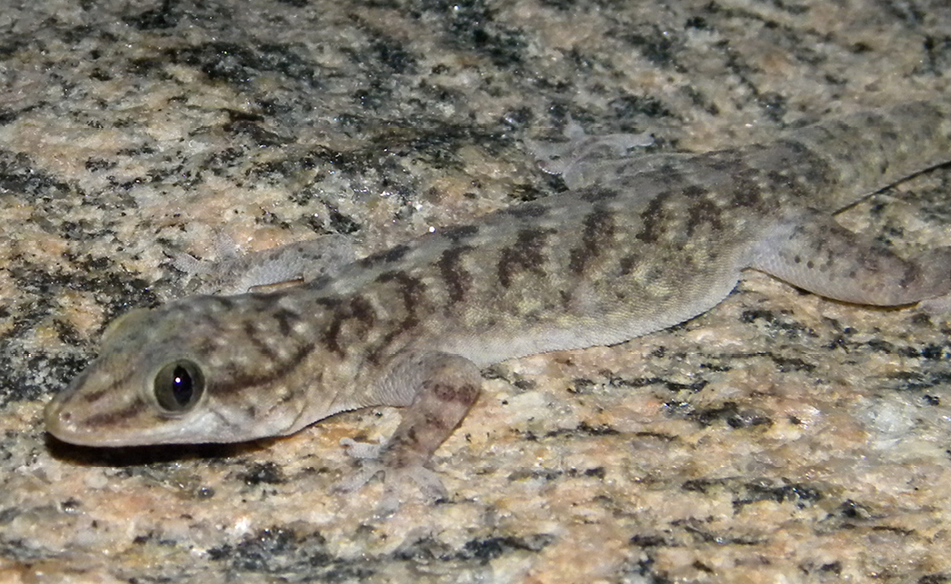
- Phyllopezus pollicaris (10.3897-zoologia.37.e46661) Figures 10–15

Scientific classification
- Kingdom: Animalia
- Phylum: Chordata
- Class: Reptilia
- Order: Squamata
- Suborder: Gekkota
- Family: Phyllodactylidae
- Genus: Phyllopezus
- Species: P. pollicaris

Binomial name
- Phyllopezus pollicaris (Spix, 1825)

Synonyms
- Thecadactylus pollicaris Spix, 1825; Phyllopezus goyazensis W. Peters, 1878; Platydactylus Spixii Schlegel in L. Müller & Brongersma, 1933; Phyllopezus pollicaris — Rodrigues, 1986

= Brazilian gecko =

Species of lizard

The Brazilian gecko (Phyllopezus pollicaris) is a species of gecko, a lizard in the family Phyllodactylidae. The species is endemic to South America. The Brazilian gecko feeds mostly on arthropods, specifically Diptera.

== Geographic range ==
P. pollicaris is found in Argentina, Bolivia, and Brazil. They can be found in a variety of places from Amazonia areas to also urban areas.

== Description ==
Dorsally, P. pollicaris is gray-brown, with darker brown transverse band-like spots.

== Reproduction ==
P. pollicaris is oviparous.
