= Phyllopezus heuteri =

Scientific classification
- Kingdom: Animalia
- Phylum: Chordata
- Class: Reptilia
- Order: Squamata
- Suborder: Gekkota
- Family: Phyllodactylidae
- Genus: Phyllopezus
- Species: P. heuteri

Binomial name
- Phyllopezus heuteri Cacciali, Lotzkat, Gamble & G. Köhler, 2018

Species of lizard

Phyllopezus heuteri is a species of gecko, a lizard in the family Phyllodactylidae. The species is endemic to Paraguay.

== Geographic range ==
P. heuteri is found in Cordillera Department, Paraguay.

== Etymology ==
The specific name, heuteri, is in honor of German biologist Horst Heuter.

== Description ==
Maximum recorded snout-to-vent length (SVL) for P. heuteri is 8.8 cm (3.5 in).
