= Stenocercus omari =

Scientific classification
- Kingdom: Animalia
- Phylum: Chordata
- Class: Reptilia
- Order: Squamata
- Suborder: Iguania
- Family: Tropiduridae
- Genus: Stenocercus
- Species: S. omari

Binomial name
- Stenocercus omari Venegas, Echevarría, García-Burneo, & Koch, 2016

Species of lizard

Stenocercus omari is a species of lizard of the family Tropiduridae. It is found in Peru.
