= Echinosaura brachycephala =

Conservation status
- Endangered (IUCN 3.1)

Scientific classification
- Kingdom: Animalia
- Phylum: Chordata
- Class: Reptilia
- Order: Squamata
- Family: Gymnophthalmidae
- Genus: Echinosaura
- Species: E. brachycephala

Binomial name
- Echinosaura brachycephala G. Köhler, Bohme, & Schmitz, 2004

Species of lizard

Echinosaura brachycephala is a species of lizard in the family Gymnophthalmidae. It is endemic to Ecuador.
