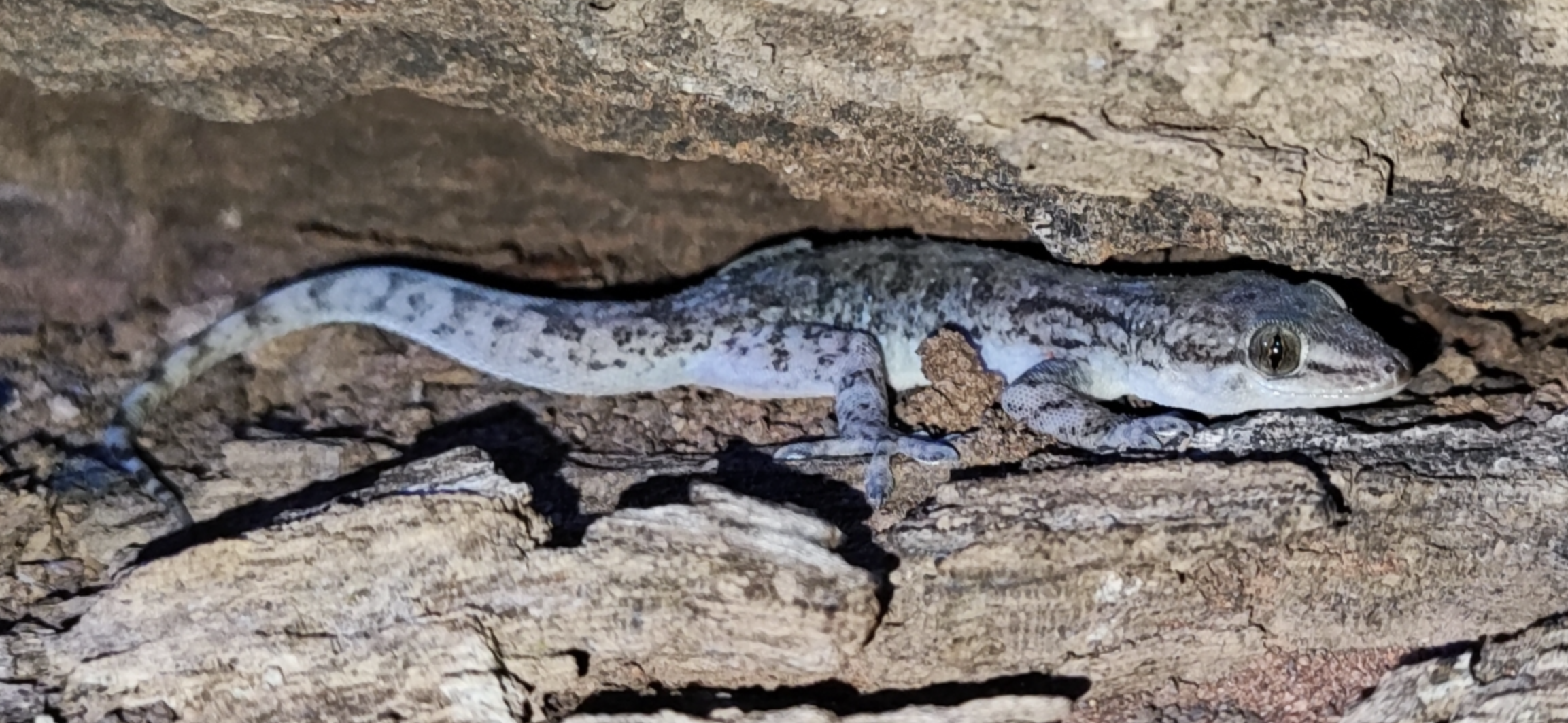
- in Mato Grosso, Brazil

Scientific classification
- Kingdom: Animalia
- Phylum: Chordata
- Class: Reptilia
- Order: Squamata
- Suborder: Gekkota
- Family: Phyllodactylidae
- Genus: Phyllopezus
- Species: P. przewalskii

Binomial name
- Phyllopezus przewalskii Koslowsky, 1895

Synonyms
- Phyllopezus przewalskii Koslowsky, 1895; Phyllopezus goyazensis Peracca, 1895; Phyllopezus pollicaris przewalskyi — Vanzolini, 1952; Phyllopezus przewalskii — Gallardo, 1956

= Przewalsky's gecko =

Przewalski's gecko

Species of lizard

Przewalski's gecko (Phyllopezus przewalskii) or Przewalski's gecko, is a species of gecko, a lizard in the family Phyllodactylidae. The species is endemic to South America.

== Etymology ==
The specific name, przewalskii, is in honor of Russian naturalist Nikolay Przhevalsky.

== Geographic range ==
P. przewalskii is found in Argentina, Bolivia, Brazil, and Paraguay.

== Description ==
The holotype has the following measurements: total length 123 mm (4.8 in); head, 20 mm (0.79 in); body, 50 mm (2.0 in); tail, 53 mm (2.1 in).
