= Ameiva parecis =

Scientific classification
- Kingdom: Animalia
- Phylum: Chordata
- Class: Reptilia
- Order: Squamata
- Family: Teiidae
- Genus: Ameiva
- Species: A. parecis

Binomial name
- Ameiva parecis (Colli, Costa, Garda, Kopp, Mesquita, Péres, Valdujo, Vieira, & Wiederhecker, 2003)

Species of lizard

Ameiva parecis is a species of teiid lizard endemic to Brazil.
