= Echinosaura centralis =

Scientific classification
- Kingdom: Animalia
- Phylum: Chordata
- Order: Squamata
- Family: Gymnophthalmidae
- Genus: Echinosaura
- Species: E. centralis

Binomial name
- Echinosaura centralis Dunn, 1944

Species of lizard

Echinosaura centralis is a species of lizard in the family Gymnophthalmidae. It is endemic to Colombia.
