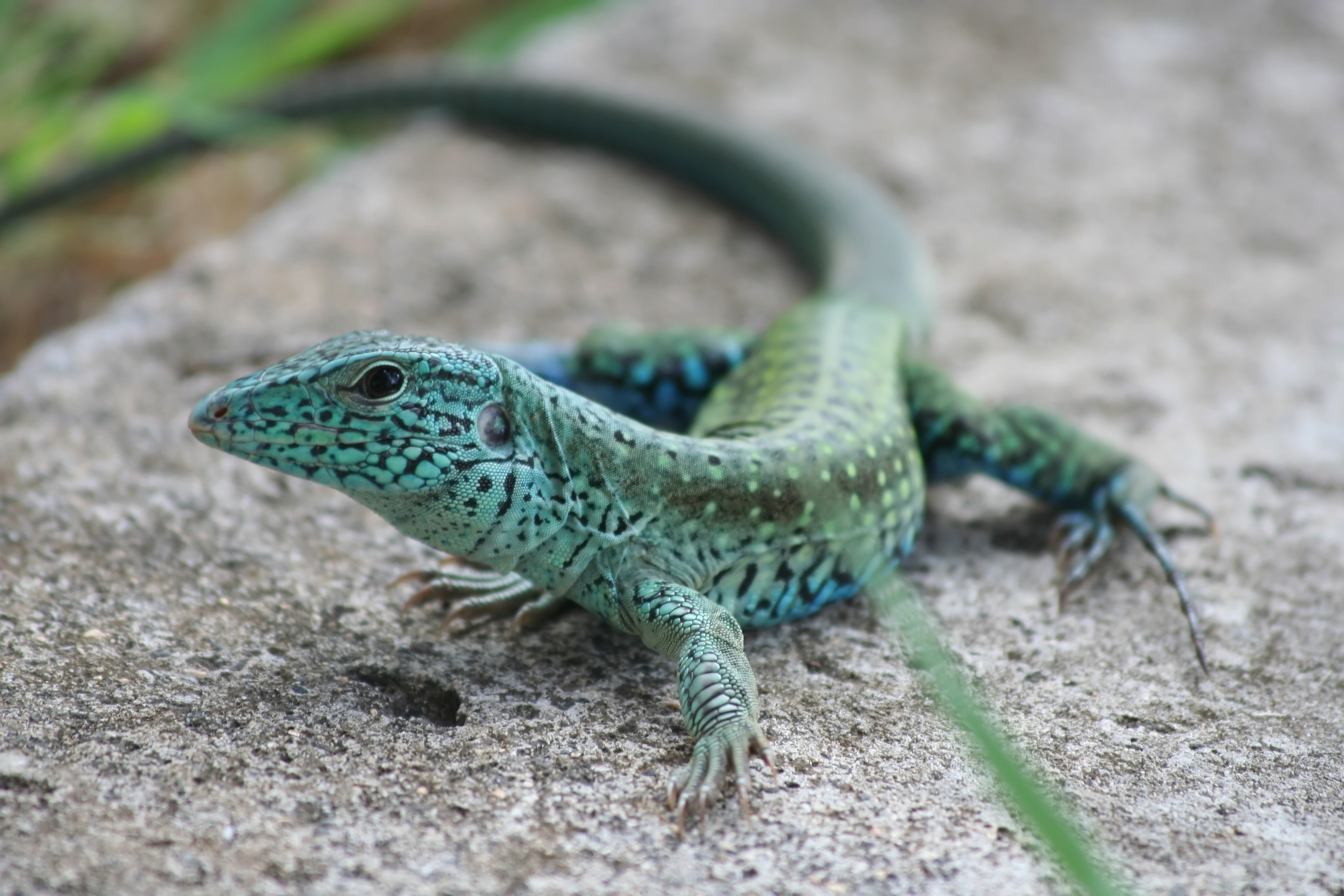

Scientific classification
- Domain: Eukaryota
- Kingdom: Animalia
- Phylum: Chordata
- Class: Reptilia
- Order: Squamata
- Family: Teiidae
- Genus: Ameiva
- Species: A. tobagana

Binomial name
- Ameiva tobagana Cope, 1879

= Ameiva tobagana =

Species of lizard

Ameiva tobagana, also known as the Antillean ameiva, is a species of teiid lizard found in Grenada and St. Vincent.
