= Key tegu =

Conservation status
- Vulnerable (IUCN 3.1)

Scientific classification
- Kingdom: Animalia
- Phylum: Chordata
- Class: Reptilia
- Order: Squamata
- Family: Gymnophthalmidae
- Genus: Echinosaura
- Species: E. keyi

Binomial name
- Echinosaura keyi (Fritts & H.M. Smith, 1969)

Synonyms
- Teuchocercus keyi Fritts & H.M. Smith, 1969; Echinosaura keyi — Torres-Carvajal et al., 2016

Species of lizard

The Key tegu (Echinosaura keyi), also known commonly as Key's teiid, is a species of lizard in the family Gymnophthalmidae. The species is endemic to the northwestern part of Ecuador.

== Taxonomy ==
The first description of Echinosaura keyi was published in 1969 by Thomas H. Fritts and Hobart Muir Smith, under the name Teuchocercus keyi, the type species of the genus Teuchocercus. The specific name, keyi, is in honor of American physician and amateur herpetologist George Key (1942–1999), who collected the holotype of the species, a male, in February 1966, with the type locality given as 4 km (2.5 mi) west of "Rio Baba bridge", 24 km (15 mi) south of Santo Domingo, Ecuador, at an elevation of about 600 m (2,000 ft). A 2016 paper moved the species to the genus Echinosaura.

== Description ==
The Key tegu has five digits with sharp claws on each limb, and a tail with six transverse rows of greatly enlarged scales that have a conical shape. Its dorsum is brown with white spots, while its belly chequered in brown and white. It is an oviparous species.

== Distribution and habitat ==
The Key tegu is endemic to an area of Ecuador that is under 13,000 km^{2} (5,000 sq mi) in size. The area spans elevations of 350–1,200 m (1,150–3,940 ft) in the provinces of Santo Domingo de los Tsachilas, Pichincha and Esmeraldas, with the habitat consisting of the Western Ecuador moist forests and the western slopes of the Andes, with their humid evergreen forests. In these forests the Key tegu is usually found along streams. It is listed as a vulnerable species on the IUCN Red List due to the limited extent of its distribution.
