= Tantilla tjiasmantoi =

Scientific classification
- Kingdom: Animalia
- Phylum: Chordata
- Class: Reptilia
- Order: Squamata
- Suborder: Serpentes
- Family: Colubridae
- Genus: Tantilla
- Species: T. tjiasmantoi

Binomial name
- Tantilla tjiasmantoi Koch & Venegas, 2016

Species of snake

Tantilla tjiasmantoi is a species of snake in the subfamily Colubrinae of the family Colubridae. The species is endemic to Peru.

== Description ==
Large for its genus, Tantilla tjiasmantoi may attain a snout-to-vent length (SVL) of 51.3 cm (20.2 in) and a total length (tail included) of 63.8 cm (25.1 in). Unusual for its genus, T. tjiasmantoi has a dorsal color pattern of crossbars, unlike most of its congeners which are striped.

== Etymology ==
The specific name, tjiasmantoi, is in honor of Wewin Tjiasmanto of Indonesia in recognition of his support of nature conservation and taxonomic research through the BIOPAT initiative.

== Geographic distribution ==
Tantilla tjiasmantoi is found in Department of La Libertad, Peru.

== Habitat ==
The preferred natural habitat of Tantilla tjiasmantoi is forest, at altitudes of 1,154–1,726 m (3,786–5,663 ft).

== Reproduction ==
Tantilla tjiasmantoi is oviparous.
