= Echinosaura fischerorum =

Scientific classification
- Kingdom: Animalia
- Phylum: Chordata
- Class: Reptilia
- Order: Squamata
- Family: Gymnophthalmidae
- Genus: Echinosaura
- Species: E. fischerorum

Binomial name
- Echinosaura fischerorum Yánez-Muñoz, Torres-Carvajal, Reyes-Puig, Urgiles-Merchán, & Koch, 2021

Species of lizard

Echinosaura fischerorum is a species of lizard in the family Gymnophthalmidae. It is endemic to Ecuador.
