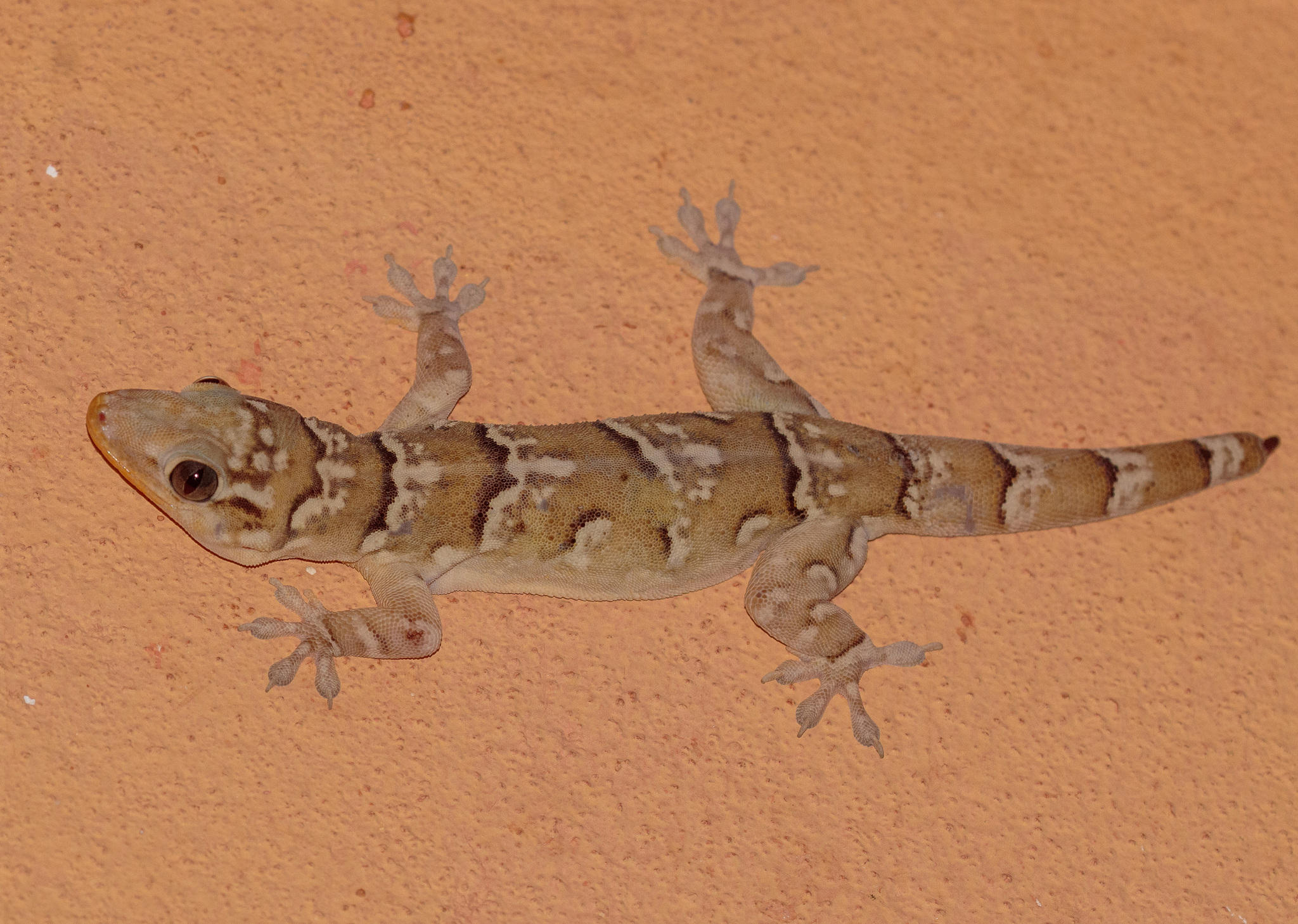
- in Rio Grande do Norte, Brazil

Conservation status
- Least Concern (IUCN 3.1)

Scientific classification
- Kingdom: Animalia
- Phylum: Chordata
- Class: Reptilia
- Order: Squamata
- Suborder: Gekkota
- Family: Phyllodactylidae
- Genus: Phyllopezus
- Species: P. periosus

Binomial name
- Phyllopezus periosus Rodrigues, 1986

= Peraiba gecko =

Species of lizard

The Paraíba gecko (Phyllopezus periosus), also commonly called the Peraiba gecko, is a species of gecko, a lizard in the family Phyllodactylidae. The species is endemic to Brazil.

== Etymology ==
The specific name, periosus, is Latin from the Greek περισσότερο, meaning "big, huge". The common name, "Paraíba gecko", refers to the Brazilian state of Paraíba.

== Geographic range ==
P. periosus is found in the Brazilian states of Alagoas, Bahia, Ceará, Paraíba, Pernambuco, and Rio Grande do Norte.

== Description ==
Dorsally, P. periosus has six or seven, dark brown, irregular-shaped crossbars, on a light gray ground color. Ventrally, adults are golden yellow, but juveniles are milky white.

Average snout-to-vent length (SVL) is 8 cm (3.1 in), but may reach 11 cm (4.3 in).

== Diet ==
P. periosus preys on insects and spiders.

== Reproduction ==
P. periosus is oviparous.
