= Phyllodactylus pachamama =

Scientific classification
- Kingdom: Animalia
- Phylum: Chordata
- Class: Reptilia
- Order: Squamata
- Suborder: Gekkota
- Family: Phyllodactylidae
- Genus: Phyllodactylus
- Species: P. pachamama

Binomial name
- Phyllodactylus pachamama Koch, Flecks, Venegas, Bialke, Valverde, & Rodder, 2016

Species of lizard

Phyllodactylus pachamama is a species of gecko. It is endemic to Peru.
