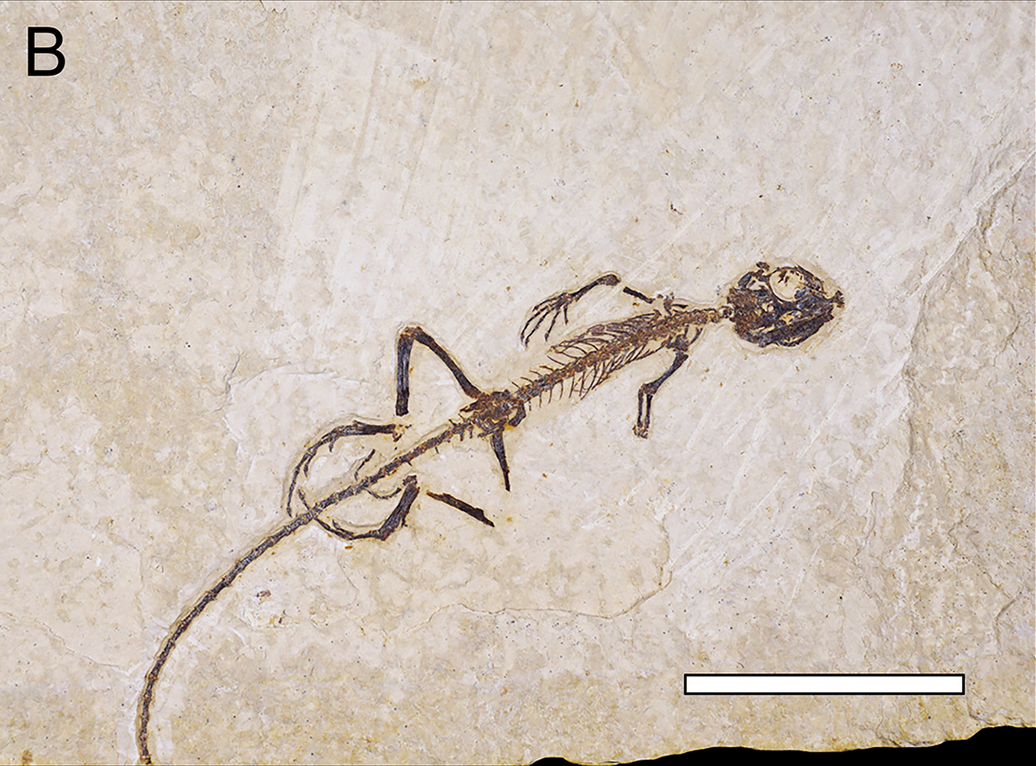
- holotype

Scientific classification
- Kingdom: Animalia
- Phylum: Chordata
- Class: Reptilia
- Order: Squamata
- Suborder: Iguania
- Family: Polychrotidae
- Genus: †Afairiguana

Type species
- †Afairiguana avius Conrad et al., 2007

= Afairiguana =

Afairiguana Temporal range: Eocene 52–51 Ma

Extinct genus of lizards

Afairiguana avius is an extinct iguanid lizard known from a nearly complete and articulated skeleton discovered in rocks of the Early Eocene-aged Green River Formation of Wyoming, United States. As of the initial description, the skeleton represents the oldest complete iguanian from the Western Hemisphere, and is the oldest representative of the extant iguanid family of anoles, Polychrotidae.

== Description ==
Afairiguana is based on FMNH PR 2379, a skeleton collected from the Warfield Springs locality of the Fossil Butte Member of the Green River Formation. It was described in 2007 by Jack Conrad, Olivier Rieppel, and Lance Grande. The type species is A. avius. The genus is a combination of the Ancient Greek word for abstract (afairo) and iguana, while the species name is derived from the Latin word meaning lost (avius), referring to the species' geographic distance from other polychrotids.

FMNH PR 2379 is essentially complete, including some cartilaginous elements, but is somewhat weathered. The skeleton is articulated and is preserved on a limestone slab, on which it is exposed in ventral view. It can be distinguished from other iguanians by details of the skull and lower jaw, the form of the ribs, and the location of the autotomy planes in the tail vertebrae (the features that allow tail separation). It was a small animal, with the thigh bones being shorter than 2 centimetres (0.79 in) in length. Conrad et al. performed a phylogenetic analysis and found Afairiguana to be a polychrotid iguanian. Upon description, it became both the oldest Western Hemisphere iguanian known from reasonably complete remains, and the oldest representative of a living iguanian family.

== Paleoecology ==
Afairiguana is one of several lizards known from the Fossil Butte Member of the Green River Formation. This rock unit represents part of Fossil Lake, the smallest and shortest-lived of three prehistoric lake systems that make up the Green River Formation. The lake sediments include a volcanic ash dating to 51.66 million years ago, during the Early Eocene. The Warfield Springs locality may have been part of a delta system. Fossils are abundant in the rocks of Fossil Lake, and illustrate a diverse assemblage of plants, bivalves, snails, crustaceans, insects, rays, bony fish, salamanders, turtles, lizards, snakes, crocodilians, birds, and mammals.
