= Phyllopezus maranjonensis =

Scientific classification
- Kingdom: Animalia
- Phylum: Chordata
- Class: Reptilia
- Order: Squamata
- Suborder: Gekkota
- Family: Phyllodactylidae
- Genus: Phyllopezus
- Species: P. maranjonensis

Binomial name
- Phyllopezus maranjonensis Koch, Venegas & Böhme, 2006

Species of lizard

Phyllopezus maranjonensis is a species of gecko, a lizard in the family Phyllodactylidae. The species is endemic to Peru.

== Geographic range ==
P. maranjonensis is found in Chachapoyas Province, Amazonas Department, Peru.

== Description ==
P. maranjonensis may attain a snout-to-vent length (SVL) of 11.5 cm (4.5 in). It is the largest species of gecko in the New World.

== Reproduction ==
P. maranjonensis is oviparous. The adult female lays two eggs per clutch, laying multiple clutches in one year.
