= Phyllopezus diamantino =

Scientific classification
- Kingdom: Animalia
- Phylum: Chordata
- Class: Reptilia
- Order: Squamata
- Suborder: Gekkota
- Family: Phyllodactylidae
- Genus: Phyllopezus
- Species: P. diamantino

Binomial name
- Phyllopezus diamantino Dubeux, Goncalves, Palmeira, Nunes, Cassimiro, Gamble, Werneck, Rodrigues, & Mott, 2022

Species of lizard

Phyllopezus diamantino is a species of gecko, a lizard in the family Phyllodactylidae. The species is endemic to Brazil.
