= Ameiva bifrontata =

Conservation status
- Least Concern (IUCN 3.1)

Scientific classification
- Domain: Eukaryota
- Kingdom: Animalia
- Phylum: Chordata
- Class: Reptilia
- Order: Squamata
- Family: Teiidae
- Genus: Ameiva
- Species: A. bifrontata

Binomial name
- Ameiva bifrontata Cope, 1862

Species of lizard

Ameiva bifrontata, known as Cope's ameiva, is a species of teiid lizard found in Peru, Colombia, Venezuela, Netherlands Antilles, and Aruba.
