= Ameiva nodam =

Scientific classification
- Kingdom: Animalia
- Phylum: Chordata
- Class: Reptilia
- Order: Squamata
- Family: Teiidae
- Genus: Ameiva
- Species: A. nodam

Binomial name
- Ameiva nodam Koch, Venegas, Rudder, Flecks, & Böhme, 2013

Species of lizard

Ameiva nodam is a species of teiid lizard endemic to Peru.
