= Claudia Koch =

German herpetologist

- Born: 1980
- Education: University of Bonn
- Known for: Research on Neotropical herpetofauna
- Scientific career
- Fields: Herpetology
- Workplaces: Museum Koenig

Claudia Koch (born 1980) is a German herpetologist and curator specializing in reptiles and amphibians, particularly the herpetofauna of Peru. She is a curator in the herpetology department of Museum Koenig in Bonn, Germany.

== Biography ==
Koch completed her secondary education at Gymnasium am Ölberg in Oberpleis, Königswinter, in May 2000. In October of that year, she began studying biology, zoology, palaeontology and geography at the University of Bonn (Rheinische Friedrich-Wilhelms-Universität Bonn). In March 2006, she completed her diploma thesis, The amphibians and reptiles of the Tumbesian dry forest region of Northern Peru, under the supervision of Wolfgang Böhme. In April 2008, she began doctoral studies at the same university and received her doctorate in natural sciences in February 2014 for her dissertation, The Herpetofauna of the Peruvian dry forest along the Andean valley of the Marañón River and its tributaries, with a focus on endemic iguanians, geckos and tegus (Squamata: Iguanidae, Phyllodactylidae, Teiidae). Since June 2014, she has worked as a curator in the herpetology department of Museum Koenig, where she also serves as a radiation protection officer and micro-computed tomography (micro-CT) officer.

Koch's research encompasses biological systematics, taxonomy, biogeography, phylogenetics, ecology and conservation biology, with a particular focus on the Neotropical herpetofauna of Peru. Her research projects include the phylogeny of American lanceheads (Bothrops), the systematics of blind snakes, the biodiversity of herpetofauna in Andean valleys, species diversity in Neotropical bush anoles (Polychrus), and the herpetofauna of Peru's tropical dry forests.

Koch has participated in the scientific description of numerous species of scaled reptiles and amphibians from Central America and South America.

Koch is a member of the executive board of the German Society for Herpetology and Herpetoculture (Deutsche Gesellschaft für Herpetologie und Terrarienkunde, DGHT), serving as vice-president for scientific herpetology. She is also a member of the Societas Europaea Herpetologica, the Alexander Koenig Society, the Society for Biological Systematics, and the Association for Tropical Biology and Conservation.

== Taxa described ==
The following species have been described with Koch as an author or co-author:

- Ameiva aggerecusans
- Ameiva nodam
- Bothrops sonene
- Echinosaura fischerorum
- Epictia antoniogarciai
- Epictia septemlineata
- Epictia rioignis
- Epictia vanwallachi
- Epictia venegasi
- Epictia vonmayi
- Neacomys marci
- Noblella naturetrekii
- Phyllodactylus delsolari
- Phyllodactylus pachamama
- Phyllodactylus thompsoni
- Phyllopezus maranjonensis
- Polychrus jacquelinae
- Stenocercus omari
- Tantilla tjiasmantoi
