= Bothrops sonene =

Scientific classification
- Kingdom: Animalia
- Phylum: Chordata
- Class: Reptilia
- Order: Squamata
- Suborder: Serpentes
- Family: Viperidae
- Genus: Bothrops
- Species: B. sonene

Binomial name
- Bothrops sonene Carrasco, Grazziotin, Cruz-Farfán, Koch, Ochoa, Scrocchi, Leynaud & Chaparro, 2019

Species of snake

Bothrops sonene is a species of venomous snake in the genus Bothrops found in Peru and Bolivia.

== Geographical range ==
Bothrops sonene is found in the Pampas del Heath region of the Bahuaja-Sonene National Park in Peru, and in adjacent areas of Bolivia. This species inhabits lowland tropical rainforests and is typically found at elevations around 200 meters above sea level.
