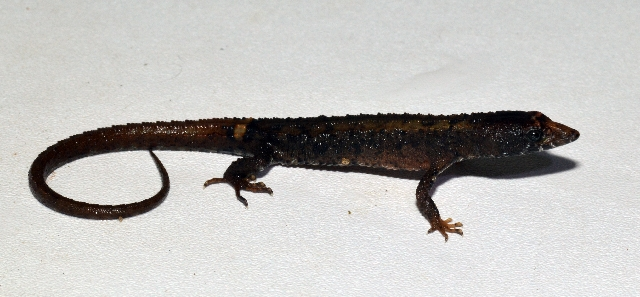
- Echinosaura palmeri

Scientific classification
- Kingdom: Animalia
- Phylum: Chordata
- Class: Reptilia
- Order: Squamata
- Family: Gymnophthalmidae
- Tribe: Cercosaurini
- Genus: Echinosaura; Boulenger, 1890

Species
- Eight, see text.

= Echinosaura =

Genus of lizards

Echinosaura is a genus of lizards, called commonly the spined tegus, in the family Gymnophthalmidae. The genus is native to Central America and South America.

== Geographic range and habitat ==
Species of Echinosaura occur in tropical rainforests of Panama and South America.

== Description ==
Spined tegu lizards are normally brown in color and have spines on the head, torso, and tail.

== Species ==
Eight species are recognised as being valid.

- Echinosaura brachycephala G. Köhler, Böhme & Schmitz, 2004
- Echinosaura centralis Dunn, 1944
- Echinosaura fischerorum Yánez-Muñoz, Torres-Carvajal, Reyes-Puig, Urgilés-Merchán & Koch, 2021
- Echinosaura horrida Boulenger, 1890 – rough teiid
- Echinosaura keyi Fritts & H.M. Smith, 1969 – Key tegu
- Echinosaura orcesi Fritts, Almendáriz & Samec, 2002
- Echinosaura palmeri Boulenger, 1911 – Palmer's teiid
- Echinosaura panamensis Barbour, 1924 – Panama teiid
