= Phyllodactylus thompsoni =

Conservation status
- Endangered (IUCN 3.1)

Scientific classification
- Kingdom: Animalia
- Phylum: Chordata
- Class: Reptilia
- Order: Squamata
- Suborder: Gekkota
- Family: Phyllodactylidae
- Genus: Phyllodactylus
- Species: P. thompsoni

Binomial name
- Phyllodactylus thompsoni Venegas, Townsend, Koch & Böhme, 2008

Species of lizard

Phyllodactylus thompsoni is a species of gecko, a lizard in the family Phyllodactylidae. The species is endemic to Peru.

== Etymology ==
The specific name, thompsoni, is in honor of American malacologist Fred Gilbert Thompson (1934–2016), who was also a herpetologist and collected the holotype of this species.

== Geographic range ==
P. thompsoni is found in northwestern Peru, in the regions (formerly departments) of Amazonas, Cajamarca, and La Libertad.

== Habitat ==
The preferred natural habitats of P. thompsoni are shrubland and forest, at altitudes of 900–1,880 m (2,950–6,170 ft).

== Description ==
P. thompsoni has an enlarged postanal scale, a character lacking in all other species of its genus in mainland South America. Not a large species, its maximum recorded snout-to-vent length (SVL) is only 4.2 cm (1.7 in).

== Reproduction ==
P. thompsoni is oviparous.
