= Przhevalsky Museum =

Museum in Kyrgyzstan

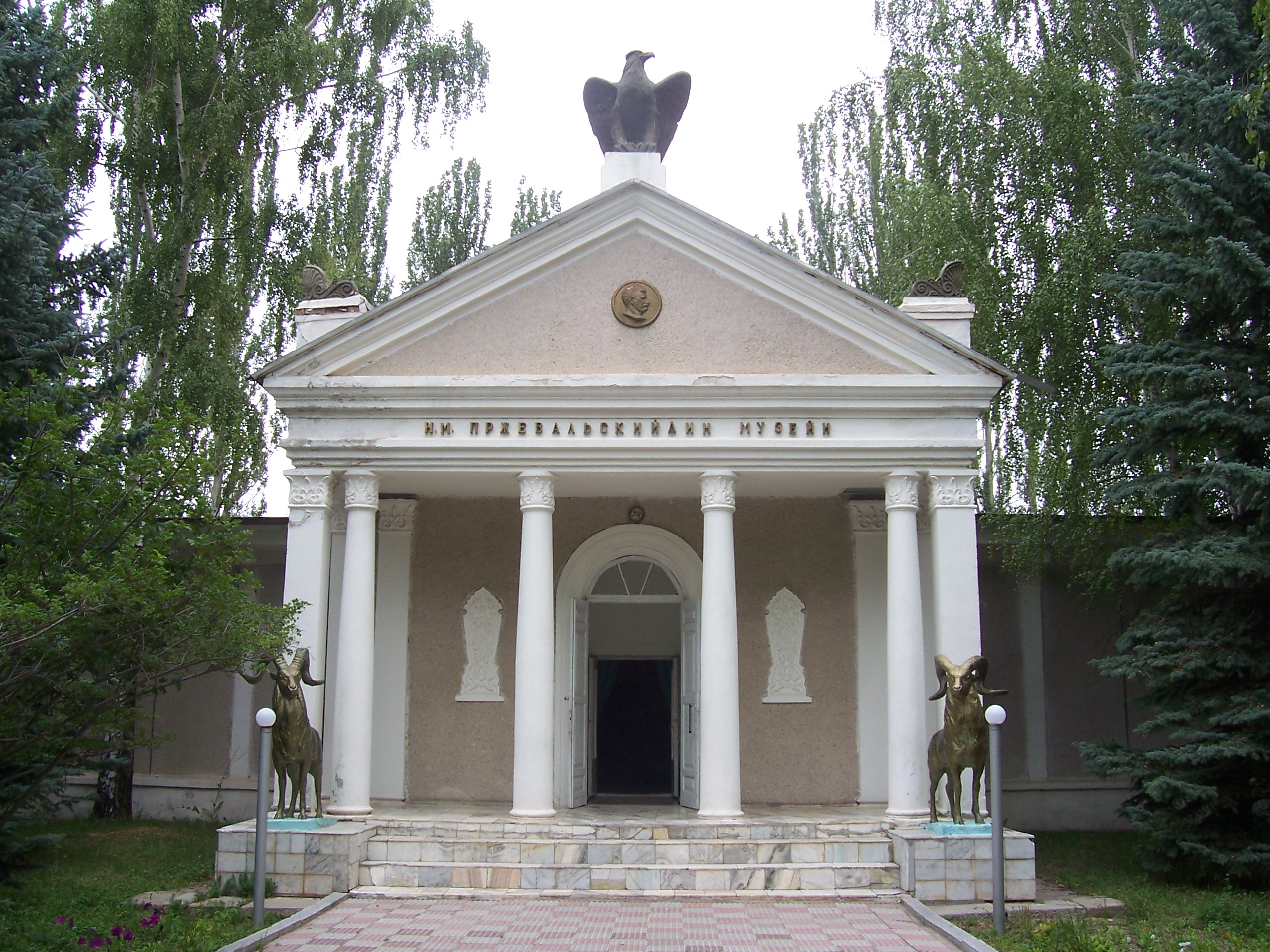
- Established: April 29, 1957; 67 years ago
- Location: Karakol, Kyrgyzstan
- Coordinates: 42.572960°N 78.321025°E

The Przhevalsky Museum (Kyrgyz: Пржевальск музей; Russian: Пржевальский музей) is a museum located in Karakol, Kyrgyzstan.

== History ==
The museum was created to commemorate the life of the explorer Nikolai Mikhailovich Przhevalsky. The museum was inaugurated in 1957, in the first three years of the museum's existence, it had obtained about 386 exhibits. In addition, a selected number of Przhevalsky's works and photographs have been transferred to the museum, one of them from the archives of the Geographical Society of the USSR. In 1958, artists Vasiliev, Gladkov and Kharlamov made 14 paintings to be exhibited in the museum, and the museum acquired 10 books from a Leningrad bookstore. The museum garden contains a sculpture of a bronze eagle that was built in 1893.

== Collections ==
The museum contains a variety of objects including instruments, drawings, maps, manuscripts. In addition, the museum contains a collection of specimens on animals and plants, these specimens were collected by Przhevalsky. The museum also has saddle bags and stuffed animals. Among the maps contained in the museum, there is a copy of the map sent from Leningrad that describes with Przhevalsky's last four travels. The museum also contains a map of Central Asia and Tibet. The museum also includes Przhevalsky's personal belongings, as well as photographs and documents. The museum contains around 2000 exhibits.

== Gallery ==
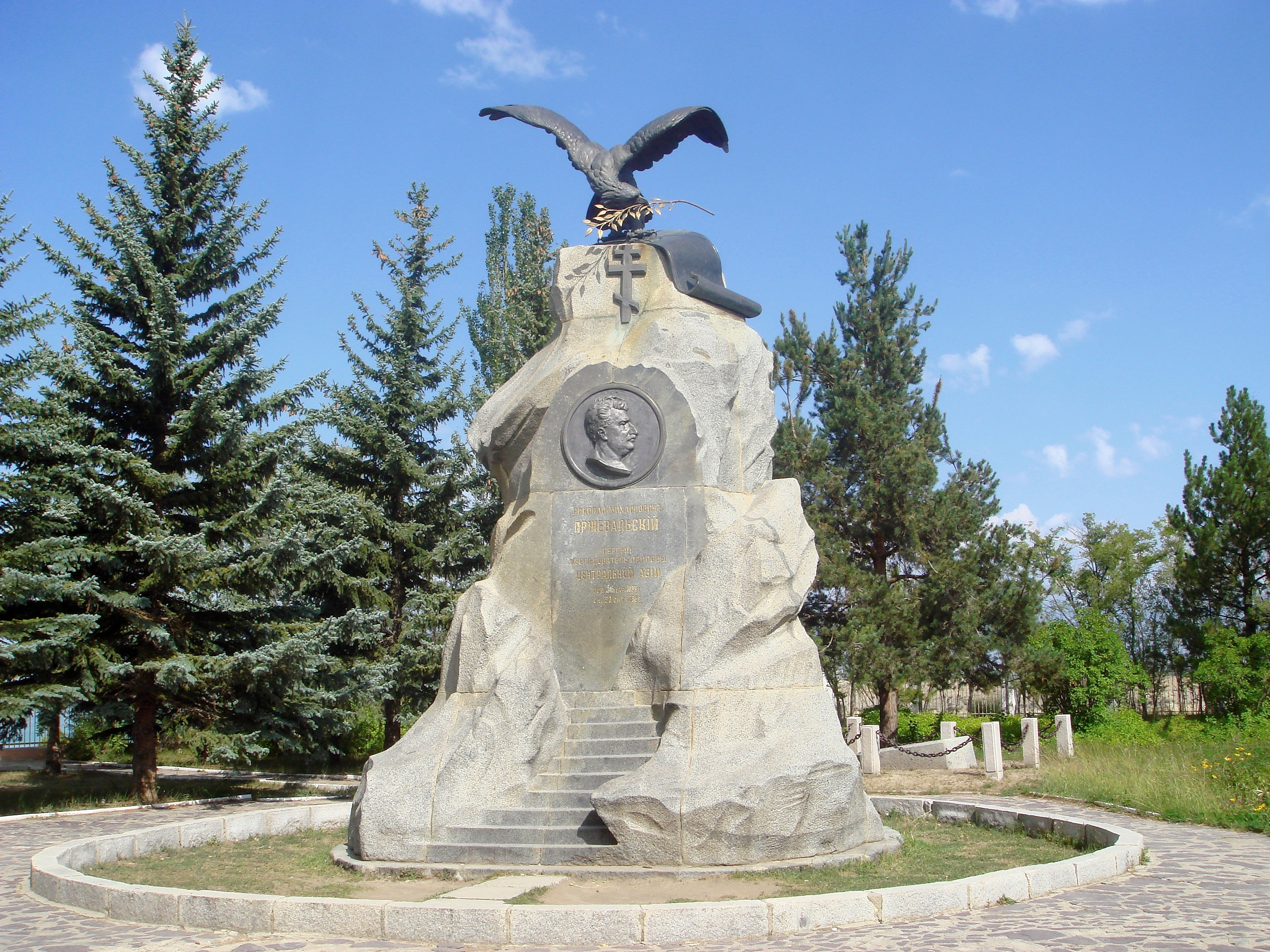
Przhevalsky Monument

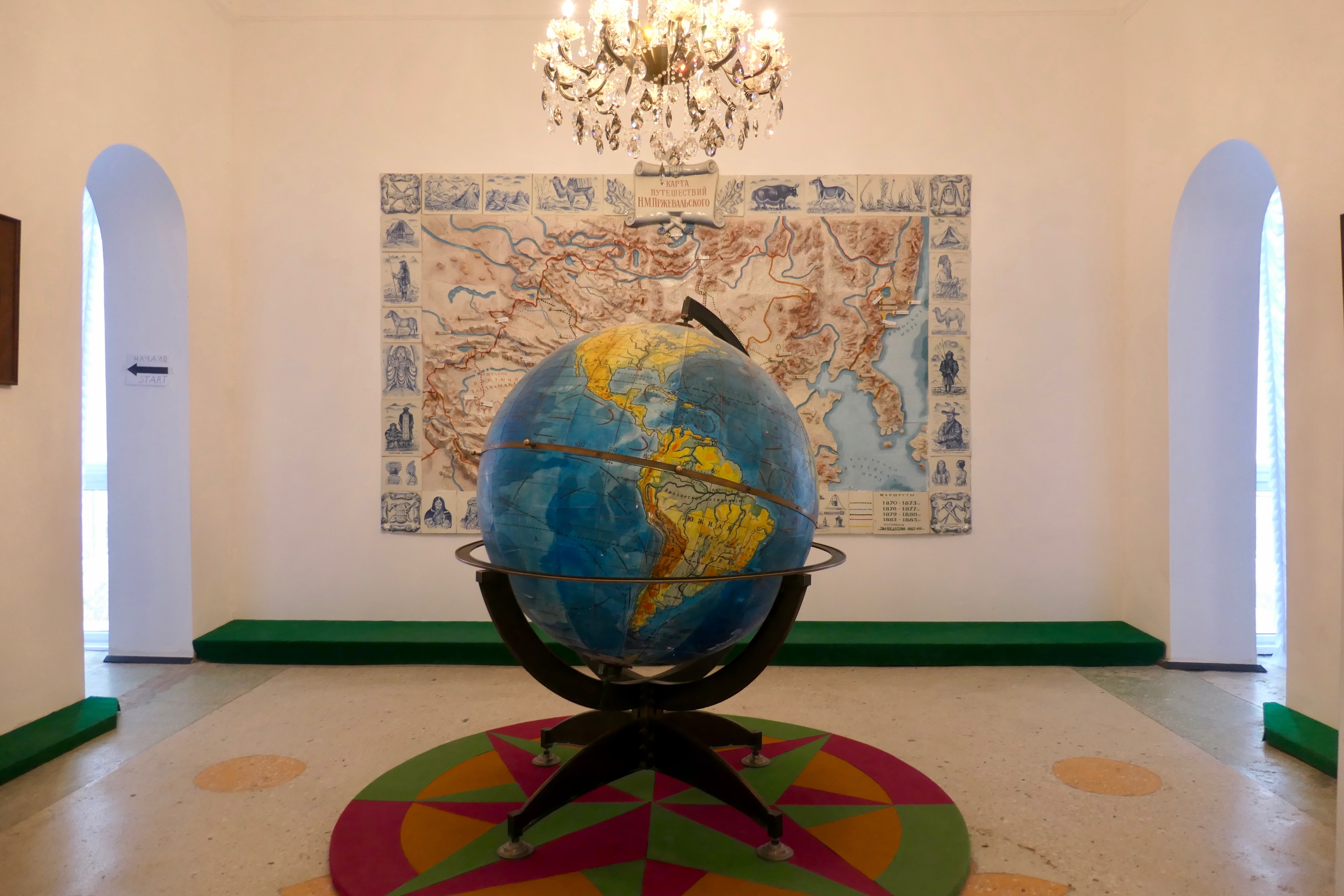
Interior of one of the museum rooms
