= Echinosaura orcesi =

Conservation status
- Near Threatened (IUCN 3.1)

Scientific classification
- Kingdom: Animalia
- Phylum: Chordata
- Class: Reptilia
- Order: Squamata
- Family: Gymnophthalmidae
- Genus: Echinosaura
- Species: E. orcesi

Binomial name
- Echinosaura orcesi Fritts, Almendáriz & Samec, 2002

Species of lizard

Echinosaura orcesi is a species of lizard in the family Gymnophthalmidae. The species is native to northwestern South America.

== Etymology ==
The specific name, orcesi, is in honor of Ecuadorian herpetologist Gustavo Orcés.

== Geographic distribution ==
Echinosaura orcesi is found in southern Colombia, in Valle del Cauca Department; and in northern Ecuador, in Carchi Province and Esmeraldas Province.

== Habitat ==
The natural habitats of Echinosaura orcesi are forest and wetlands.

== Behavior ==
Echinosaura orcesi is terrestrial and semiaquatic.

== Reproduction ==
Echinosaura orcesi is oviparous.
