= Ameiva concolor =

Conservation status
- Least Concern (IUCN 3.1)

Scientific classification
- Kingdom: Animalia
- Phylum: Chordata
- Class: Reptilia
- Order: Squamata
- Suborder: Lacertoidea
- Family: Teiidae
- Genus: Ameiva
- Species: A. concolor

Binomial name
- Ameiva concolor (Ruthven, 1924)

Species of lizard

Ameiva concolor is a species of teiid lizard endemic to Peru.
