= Echinosaura horrida =

Conservation status
- Least Concern (IUCN 3.1)

Scientific classification
- Kingdom: Animalia
- Phylum: Chordata
- Class: Reptilia
- Order: Squamata
- Suborder: Lacertoidea
- Family: Gymnophthalmidae
- Genus: Echinosaura
- Species: E. horrida

Binomial name
- Echinosaura horrida Boulenger, 1890

Species of lizard

Echinosaura horrida, the rough teiid, is a species of lizard in the family Gymnophthalmidae. It is found in Ecuador and Colombia.
