= Ameiva jacuba =

Scientific classification
- Kingdom: Animalia
- Phylum: Chordata
- Class: Reptilia
- Order: Squamata
- Family: Teiidae
- Genus: Ameiva
- Species: A. jacuba

Binomial name
- Ameiva jacuba Giugliano, Nogueira, Valdujo, Collevatti, & Colli, 2013

Species of lizard

Ameiva jacuba is a species of teiid lizard endemic to Brazil.
