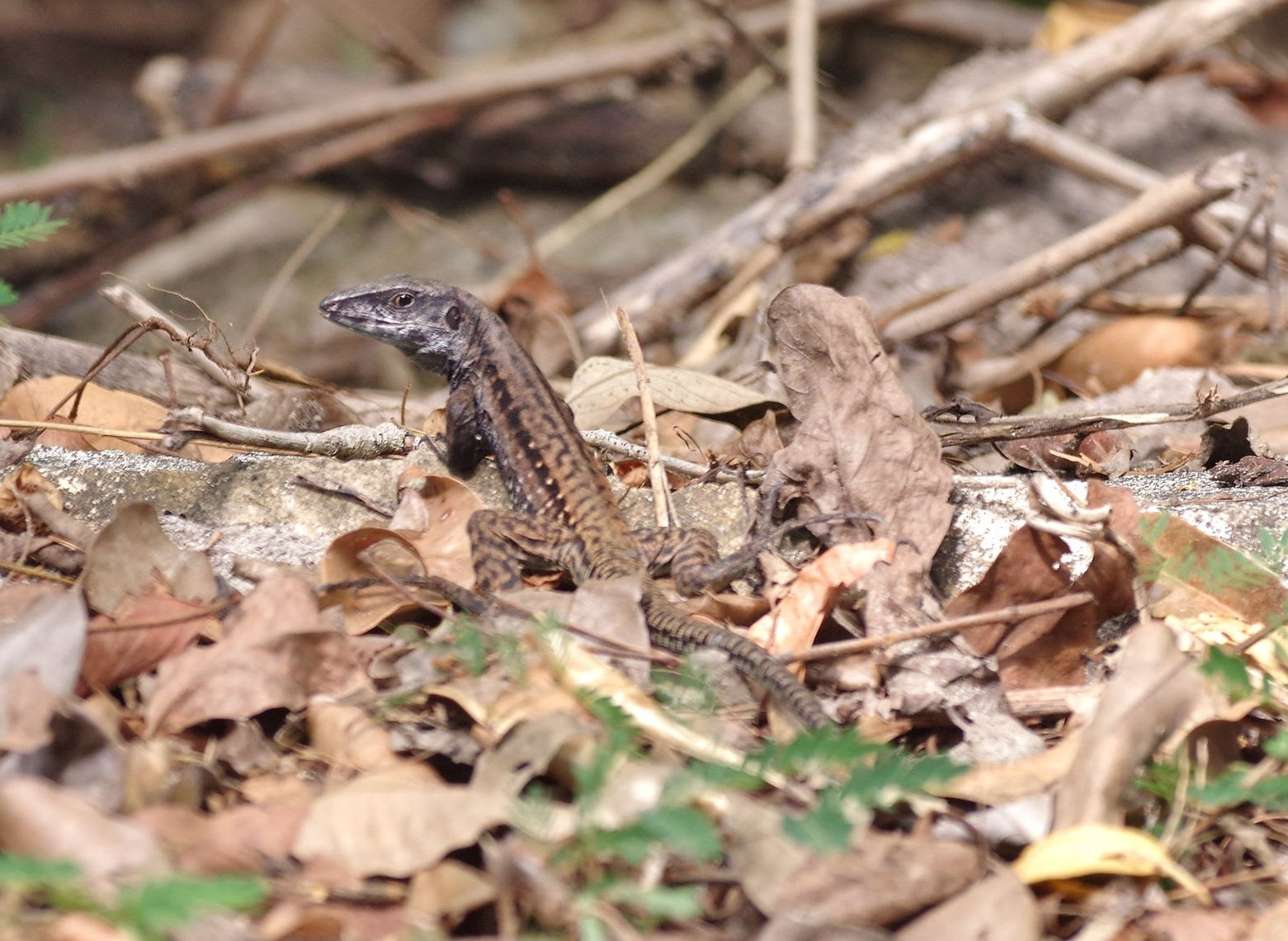

Scientific classification
- Kingdom: Animalia
- Phylum: Chordata
- Class: Reptilia
- Order: Squamata
- Family: Teiidae
- Genus: Ameiva
- Species: A. fuliginosa

Binomial name
- Ameiva fuliginosa (Cope, 1892)

= Ameiva fuliginosa =

Species of lizard

Ameiva fuliginosa is a species of teiid lizard found on Isla de Providencia, San Andrés, and the Swan Islands.

Reproduction: oviparous.
