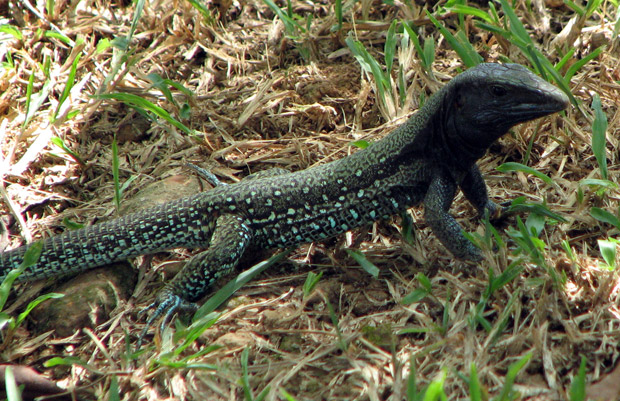

Conservation status
- Least Concern (IUCN 3.1)

Scientific classification
- Kingdom: Animalia
- Phylum: Chordata
- Class: Reptilia
- Order: Squamata
- Suborder: Lacertoidea
- Family: Teiidae
- Genus: Ameiva
- Species: A. atrigularis

Binomial name
- Ameiva atrigularis Garman, 1887

= Ameiva atrigularis =

Species of lizard

Ameiva atrigularis, known as giant ameiva and Amazon racerunner, is a species of teiid lizard found on Trinidad and Tobago and in Venezuela. Males can reach a snout–vent length of 186 mm (7.3 in).
