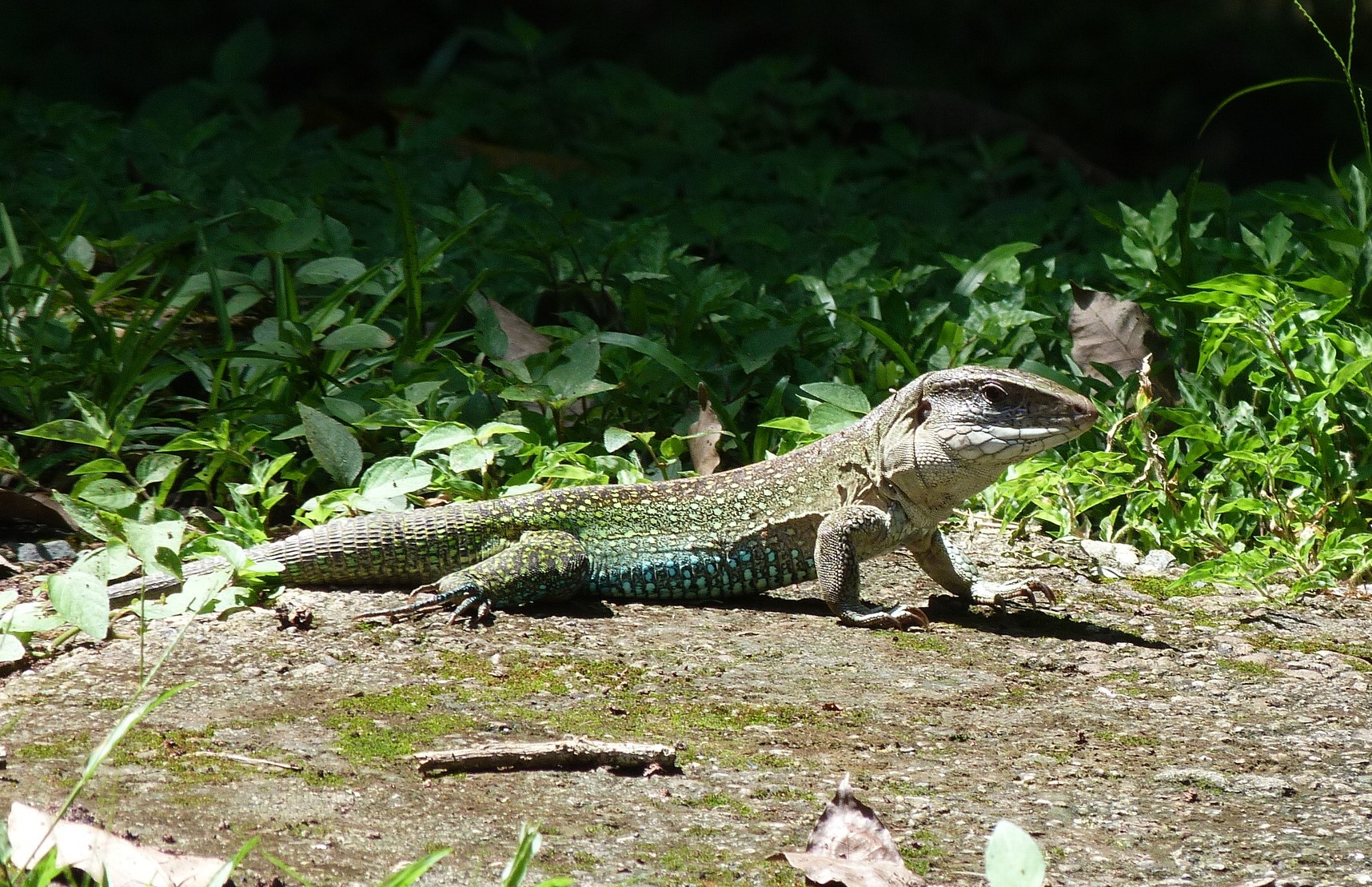

Conservation status
- Least Concern (IUCN 3.1)

Scientific classification
- Kingdom: Animalia
- Phylum: Chordata
- Class: Reptilia
- Order: Squamata
- Family: Teiidae
- Genus: Ameiva
- Species: A. praesignis

Binomial name
- Ameiva praesignis (Baird & Girard, 1852)

= Ameiva praesignis =

Species of lizard

Ameiva praesignis, known as Caripial comehuevo, giant ameiva and Amazon racerunner, is a species of teiid lizard found in Costa Rica, Panama, Venezuela, and Colombia.
