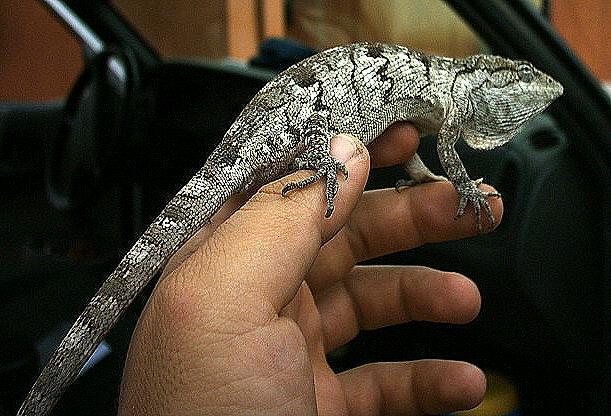
- Polychrus acutirostris

Scientific classification
- Kingdom: Animalia
- Phylum: Chordata
- Class: Reptilia
- Order: Squamata
- Suborder: Iguania
- Family: Polychrotidae
- Genus: Polychrus; Cuvier, 1817

Type species
- Draco marmoratus Linnaeus, 1758

Species
- See text

= Polychrus =

Genus of lizards

Polychrus is the only extant genus of polychrotid lizards in the world. Commonly called bush anoles, they are found in Central and South America, as well as nearby Trinidad and Tobago.

Polychrus means "many colored". True anoles in other genera are now placed in Dactyloidae. Polychrus is presently in the family Polychrotidae.

== Species ==
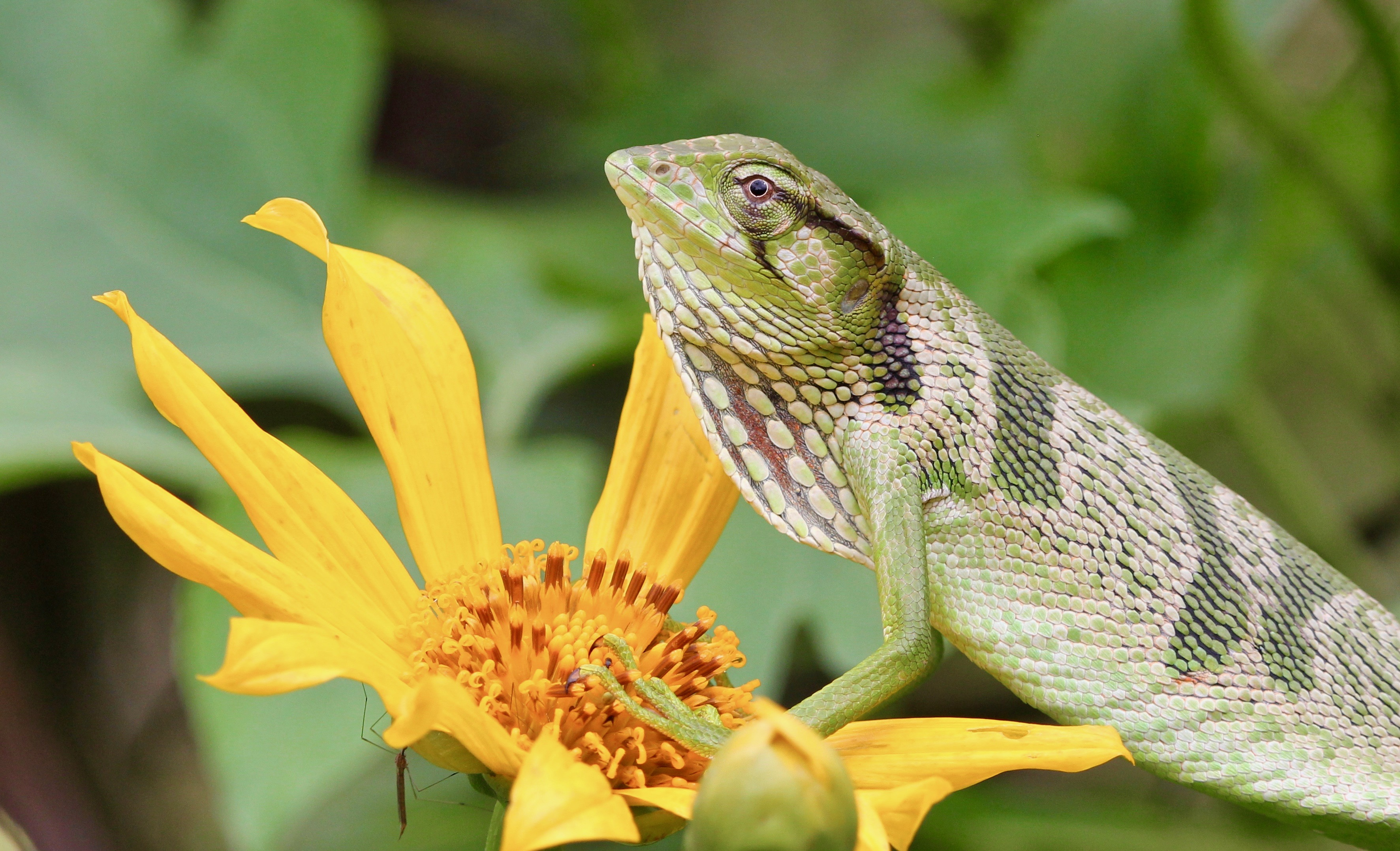
Polychrus gutturosus seen in Tapir Valley, Tenorio Volcano National Park, Costa Rica.

- Polychrus acutirostris – Brazilian bush anole Spix, 1825
- Polychrus auduboni – Many-colored bush anole Hallowell, 1845
- Polychrus femoralis – Werner's bush anole Werner, 1910
- Polychrus gutturosus – Berthold's bush anole Berthold, 1845
- Polychrus jacquelinae – Jacqueline's bush anole Koch, Venegas, Garcia-Bravo, and Böhme, 2011
- Polychrus liogaster – Boulenger's bush anole Boulenger, 1908
- Polychrus marmoratus – many-colored bush anole Linnaeus, 1758
- Polychrus peruvianus – Peruvian bush anole Noble, 1924

== Fossil history ==
Though species of Polychrus have an almost exclusively South American distribution today, a stem representative, Sauropithecoides charisticus, was reported from the late Eocene of North Dakota, USA.
