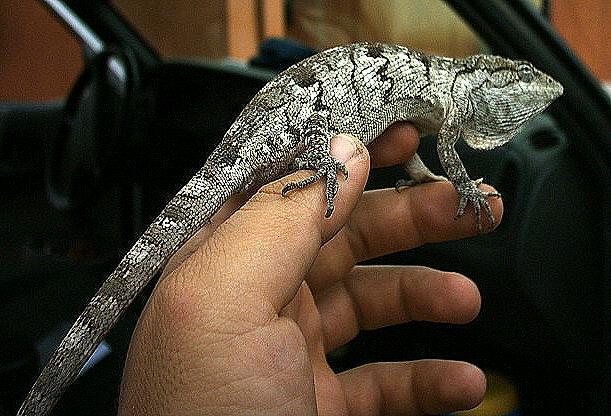
- Polychrus acutirostris

Scientific classification
- Kingdom: Animalia
- Phylum: Chordata
- Class: Reptilia
- Order: Squamata
- Suborder: Iguania
- Infraorder: Pleurodonta
- Family: Polychrotidae; Frost & Etheridge, 1989

Genera
- †Afairiguana; Polychrus

= Polychrotidae =

Polychrotidae Temporal range: Eocene - present, 52–0 Ma

Family of lizards

The Polychrotidae family of iguanian lizards contains the living genus Polychrus (commonly called bush anoles) and the extinct genus Afairiguana. The family Polychrotidae was once thought to encompass all anoles, including those in the genus Anolis (which are now included in the family Dactyloidae). Studies of the evolutionary relationships of anoles based on molecular information has shown that Polychrus is not closely related to Anolis, but instead closer to Hoplocercidae. It is therefore not part of Dactyloidae and instead is treated as the family, Polychrotidae.
