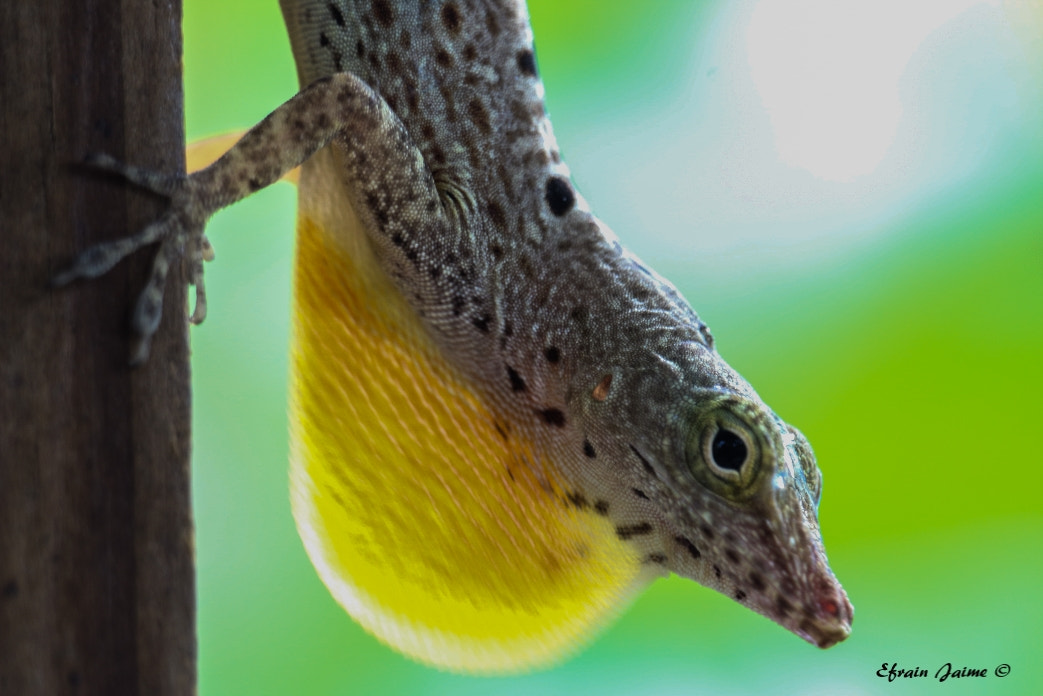
- Male with extended dewlap

Conservation status
- Least Concern (IUCN 3.1)

Scientific classification
- Kingdom: Animalia
- Phylum: Chordata
- Class: Reptilia
- Order: Squamata
- Suborder: Iguania
- Family: Anolidae
- Genus: Anolis
- Species: A. stratulus

Binomial name
- Anolis stratulus Cope, 1861

Synonyms
- Anolis dorsomaculatus Reinhardt & Lütken, nomen nudum; Anolis striatulus Cope, 1862, lapsus; Ctenonotus stratulus (Cope, 1862)

= Anolis stratulus =

Species of reptile

Anolis stratulus is a moderately-sized species of anole (US: /əˈnoʊ.li/) (family Dactyloidae) found in Puerto Rico, the United States Virgin Islands and the British Virgin Islands. It is a gray-colored lizard spotted with brown markings. It is arboreal, usually found positioned on tree bark on branches in the canopies of forest trees, where in some areas of Puerto Rico it can be incredibly abundant, with tens of thousands of the lizards being present per hectare.

It is locally known as the lagartijo manchando in Puerto Rico. Names which have been coined for it in English are spotted anole, Puerto Rican spotted anole (in Puerto Rico), banded anole (in Puerto Rico), saddled anole, salmon lizard, barred anole, St. Thomas anole or the somewhat of a misnomer chameleon, because it can change color. It is known as the "spotted anole" because of the black markings on its back; the Spanish word manchado means as much. There are no salmon in Puerto Rico; the name "salmon lizard" may have been invented for tourists in 2007 by Alan Mowbray, 'interpretive media writer' for the website of El Yunque National Forest, referring to the trout-like colour pattern of its flanks or the perhaps his interpretation of the color of the skin. The names "saddled anole" and "barred anole" are likely taken from the 1862 description by Edward Drinker Cope, although it is not really true, Cope believed that the lizards were characteristically saddled with brown transverse bars on their back. The name "banded anole" may also refer to that. "St. Thomas anole" is also from Cope; although he was immediately corrected in a 1862 Danish publication, in his original English-language publication he stated the anole was only found on the island of St. Thomas.

== Taxonomy ==
This species of lizard, along with many other reptiles, was first studied by the Danish apothecary Albert Heinrich Riise who in 1838 had moved to town of Taphus (which means 'bar', owing to the amount of rum produced and served there) on Sankt Thomas Island in the Danish West Indies to eventually open a pharmacy and distillery of medicinal rums and bitters. Riise, successful in this endeavour, was also extremely interested in the natural history of his surroundings, and by the 1840s had begun to ship ample specimens of plants and animals to Copenhagen, and many also found their way elsewhere throughout Europe and the young United States. In Copenhagen the zoologists Johannes Theodor Reinhardt and Christian Frederik Lütken had begun work on a great monograph, eventually some 200 pages excluding illustrations, on the amphibians and reptiles of the Danish West Indies and the wider Caribbean, much of it based on the extensive collections of Riise. Riise had collected numerous specimens of this lizard from the islands of St. Thomas, Puerto Rico, Vieques, Tortola and Jost van Dyke, which Reinhardt and Lütken had described as Anolis dorsomaculatus, and named as such numerous specimens that had already been distributed to museums throughout Europe and the Americas.

Unfortunately for them however, just before they were set to publish their work, the young American Edward Drinker Cope, an industrious man, hungry for recognition, who had been given a job cataloguing the herpetological collection at the Academy of Natural Sciences in Philadelphia, had also set upon the Riise specimens (Cope consistently misspells his name as Rüse throughout his article) and rushed to describe the new species for posterity himself, publishing his work a week or two earlier than them, which necessitated a rush of last minute changes to their manuscript in the days before it could be brought to the printers. The rather summary article by Cope is dated to 1861, although it was actually published in the beginning of February 1862, and Reinhardt and Lütken published their work on 14 February 1862, with numerous revisions to accommodate and correct Cope.

Cope only published that the species was to be found on Sankt Thomas, not having known or studied the entirety of Riise's collections, and only examining a handful of specimens to be found in nearby US institutions, all of which happened to have been collected on that island. Cope misspelled, or perhaps the typesetter of the printer, or editor of the journal his description was published in, misspelled, the Latin name as striatulus; this was subsequently corrected by Reinhardt and Lütken. These two authors also appended some two pages of anatomical corrections and extra details to Cope's original description.

For the next century and a half the taxonomy remained stable and uncontroversial, but in 1986 Craig Guyer and Jay M. Savage attempted to split the very large genus Anolis based on skeletal, immunology and karyological datasets used together in a type of cladistics method called "successive weighted characters", thus moving most species into a new very large genus called Norops. Following Guyer and Savage, Albert Schwartz and Robert W. Henderson reclassified this species as Ctenonotus stratulus in 1988, moving the species to a new genus advocated by Guyer and Savage in 1986. Because this splitting caused the new remaining genera to be paraphyletic, In 2012 the same authors, Guyer and Savage, together with Kirsten Nicholson and Brian Crother, gave Ctenonotus another go, although soon after, in 2013, other taxonomists again pointed out flaws in this approach. In 2018 Nicholson et al. again reiterated that the species should be moved to Ctenonotus.

At least in 2007 the Integrated Taxonomic Information System recognised the species in the genus Ctenonotus, but this database recognises it in Anolis as of 2020. The Reptile Database has also maintained recognition of it within the genus Anolis as of 2020.

=== Higher classification ===
A. stratulus has been classified as a member of a "cristatellus series" along with A. acutus, A. cristatellus, A. cooki, A. desechensis, A. ernestwilliamsi, A. evermanni, A. gundlachi, A. krugi, A. monensis, A. poncensis, A. pulchellus and A. scriptus; all native to Puerto Rico and neighbouring islands.

=== Etymology ===
Cope states that the etymology of the specific epithet, stratulus, which he chose for this lizard in his 1862 description of the species, was derived from the diminutive of the Latin language word stratus, which he states he chose for its meaning of 'saddled' (the word can have many meanings). Cope chooses the descriptive name 'saddled' because according to him the species has four characteristic dark brown transverse bars across its back, and another across its tail. Cope had access to limited specimens, and perhaps those he examined had these markings, but in the description published by Reinhardt and Lütken, they state that this pattern is often not apparent, especially in specimens where the dark brown spots dominate (their description is more like that below, a number of brown, transverse tracks or bands running down the back, paired with a series of brown spots on its flanks).

== Description ==
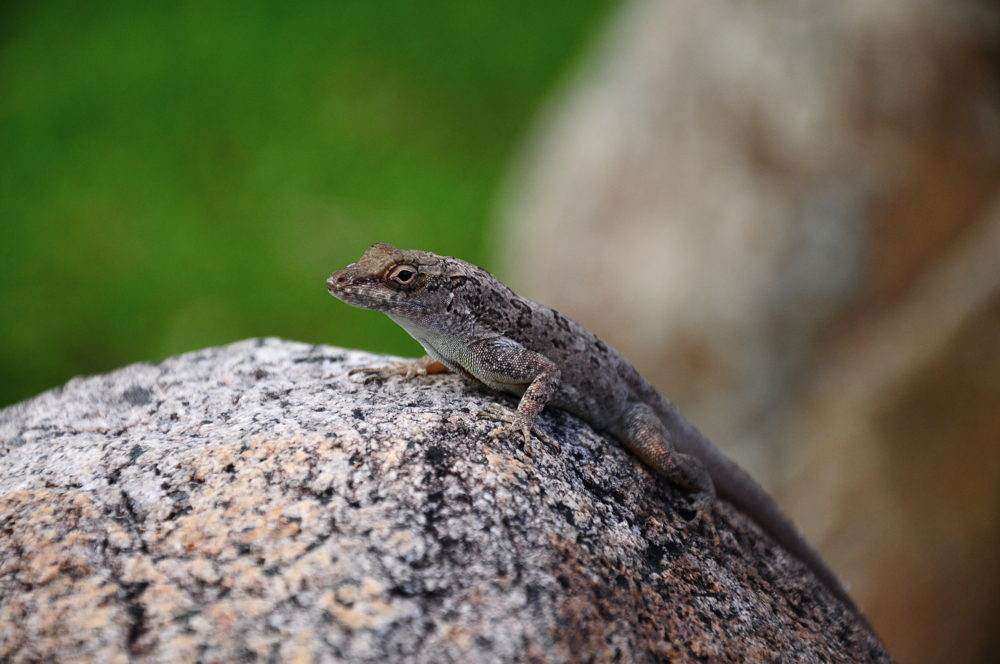
Individual in Puerto Rico

This species of anole is a small lizard (or moderately-sized for an anole), adults measuring 40 to 44 mm (1.6 to 1.7 in) from snout to vent in males, in females to 46 mm (1.8 in).

The male does not have a dorsal crest or tail fin which is common in many of the anole lizards of Puerto Rico. The species' range of color is from gray to brownish gray. It has a pale colored, hour-glass shaped spots from the nape of its neck to its tail, and also has a black, crescent-shaped patch behind the eye. It has distinct black or darker markings running down the nape of its neck and its back, which are more noticeable on males. Its flanks are marked with small dark spots. The throat of this anole has raised brown ridges and the dewlap color is orange with light yellow scales, or "bright orange and yellow toward the margins". The dewlap is rather large. The tail is slightly compressed, with the eight or nine vertical rows of weakly keeled scales being arranged in a clearly whorled or verticillate pattern, and the upper margin (edge) of the tail being strongly toothed. The tail measures 51 to 75 mm (2.0 to 3.0 in) in length.

In females the dewlap much smaller than it is in the male, and it is colored gray, with some pale orange in the centre near the throat. Unlike in many other anoles, in this species the juveniles have the same coloration and color patterns as do the adults. Reinhardt and Lütken provide a comparison table of anatomical dimensions of the males and females, with the females being slightly smaller in all measured characteristics according to them (although see above).

It has four or five rows of loreal scales. There are zero to one scales between the supraorbital ridges, and one to three scales between the interparietal and supraorbital semicircular area. There are six postrostral scales, six postmental scales, and the subocular scales are in broad contact with the supralabial scales. The supradigital scales only have a single keel (are unicarinate).

=== Similar species ===
Juveniles may be confused with those of Anolis evermanni in situ. Adults of A. evermanni are emerald green, but the juveniles of this species have the same cryptic coloration as this species. The juveniles of these two species can be distinguished by the colors of the head and neck. These are uniformly gray in this species, but in A. evermanni are greenish gray.

In his original description of 1862 Cope considered this species to be most similar to A. alligator, based mostly on the shape of the head, which is now in modern times is considered a synonym of A. roquet and is not considered particularly closely related to this species at all. On the other hand Reinhardt and Lütken find it most similar to the also Puerto Rican A. pulchellus in its dewlap, and they also compare it to juvenile A. cristatellus, but mention that this species can be distinguished by the darker backsides, and a longer, differently shaped head; both these species are now indeed thought to be closely related to A. stratulus. As with all anoles, the pattern of scales on the head are diagnostic.

== Distribution ==
This species has one of the widest natural distributions of all the anoles of Puerto Rico and this range includes the many islands surrounding it such a Vieques and Culebra. In Puerto Rico it is commonly found in the Maricao State Forest, the Guánica State Forest, and the Luquillo Mountains. It has been described as "very common" in Los Tres Picachos State Forest where it is more common than the "common anole", Anolis cristatellus. It is the most abundant anole at mid-elevations in Puerto Rico. It is less common in the northwestern part of Puerto Rico. It is also present in Cayo Santiago (Humacao) and Isla Piñeros. On the islet of Cayo Santiago and the nearby southern coastal regions of Puerto Rico, such as the city of Ponce, it is also less common than A. cristatellus. The barred anole is also found, but to a lesser extent, in the coffee plantations of the barrios of Sabana Grande, Vivi Arriba, and Mameye. It is also seen in the municipality of Utuado, and in the barrios of Cialito and Pozas in Ciales.

Outside of Puerto Rico the species can be found in the British Virgin Islands, where it has been recorded on Anegada, Beef Island, Fallen Jerusalem Island, Ginger Island, Great Camanoe, Great Thatch, Guana Island, Jost van Dyke, Little Jost Van Dyke, Little Thatch, Marina Cay, Mosquito Island, Necker Island, Norman Island, Peter Island, Prickly Pear Island, Saba Rock, Salt Island, Scrub Island, Tortola and Virgin Gorda.

It is a commonly observed animal in the northern United States Virgin Islands, specifically the north side of St. Thomas. It has furthermore been recorded on Bovoni Cay, Cas Cay, Congo Cay, Flanagan Island, Great St. James, Inner Brass, Leduck Island, Little St. James, Lovango Cay, Mingo Cay, Outer Brass, Patricia Cay, Prickly Pear Cay, Saba Island, Savana Island, St. John, Stephen Cay Thatch Cay, Trunk Cay, Water Island and Whistling Cay. It does not occur on the largest island of the territory, Saint Croix to the south.

== Ecology ==
=== Habitat ===
This lizard is a "trunk-crown ecomorph" (or a "trunk-crown dwarf") arboreal anole that is mostly observed on tree trunks, in the canopies, and occasionally in grasses. It is most frequently found on trees from 2 m (6.6 ft) to the canopy, where it seems to be most abundant. The species can be seen in both shaded and sunny areas, although compared to A. cristatellus, where they occur together, it is more often found in shaded areas. It is especially common in along roadsides and trails in forests. It prefers xerophytic and mesophytic environments rather than wet forests with a high level of precipitation. This anole has an altitude range from sea level to 365 m (1,198 ft), although it has been recorded up to 945 m (3,100 ft) in Los Tres Picachos State Forest, up to 1,200 ft (370 m) northwest of Lares, Puerto Rico, or even 1,500 ft (460 m).

The anoles of this species which are found in the El Yunque National Forest in Puerto Rico generally occupy the tabonuco, Dacryodes excelsa, tree canopy, which range from 10 to 20 meters in height from the ground. Despite their incredibly vast numbers here, the lizards may be difficult to see for visitors to the forests, because they live high up in the canopy and are camouflaged. After hurricanes which may periodically strafe this region and tear down much of the canopy, leaving the forests with mostly upright but completely denuded trees, these lizards are then seen in great abundance because they then live amongst the fallen branches and foliage, which can be up to five meters thick.

On the terrain of the large navy base of Sabana Seca on the northern coast of Puerto Rico (as of 2020 still owned by the navy, but closed in 2003, like almost all of the many large bases the US military used to occupy on the island) this species is abundant in all the forested habitats of the area -the mangrove forests, wooded karst hilltops and valleys, and the high, seasonally semi-flooded palo de pollo forests of Pterocarpus officinalis.

=== Behaviour ===
It is oviparous (egg-laying). It can change color. The color pattern of spots and markings makes it well-camouflaged against the lichen-spotted tree bark on which it commonly resides. The lizard prefers smaller branches and individuals have a small range, only venturing around a territory of no more than 6 meters for foraging and mating. This species has a population turnover of 1.4 years.

It is diurnal. It is not shy, especially the males, and they let humans come quite close -showing their dewlap as an observer approaches.

=== Interactions with other species ===
In some regions, such as El Yunque National Forest, A. cristatellus occurs together with up to seven other species of anole which are able to occur sympatrically with it because each species occupies a different ecological niche. In the Los Tres Picachos State Forest it occurs together with A. cristatellus, A. cuvieri, A. evermanni, A. gundlachi, A. krugi, A. occultus and A. pulchellus. Besides A. pulchellus, these other seven anoles often occur together throughout Puerto Rico.

==== Diet ====
A. stratulus has a diet consisting of mainly ants, but also consumes other insects such as beetles and flies, as well as land snails and spiders. It has been found to eat more during the rainy season than during the dry season.

On the Guana Island a male lizard was observed to climb into a flowering Pedilanthus tithymaloides, where for a period of over ten minutes it proceeded to lap up the droplets sweet nectar being extruded from the red flowers of this plant.

==== Parasites ====
In its native Puerto Rico, individuals of this species may sometimes contract a type of anole malaria, Plasmodium azurophilum, a unicellular eukaryotic parasite that infects both the white and red blood cells of its victims, and which is thought to be contracted from infected mosquitoes. The disease commonly afflicts another anole species which occurs in the same forests, A. gundlachi, with usually around 30% of that species being infected as opposed to under 1% for A. stratulus.

== Conservation ==
This is a very common species in many parts of Puerto Rico, where it may occur at densities of thousands to tens of thousands per acre. One estimate puts it at 21,500 per hectare (which one website calculated as 46,000 per acre, and then reconverted to 23,000 per hectare).

The IUCN has not evaluated this species' conservation status.

It has been recorded as present in the following protected areas:

- Guánica State Forest, Puerto Rico, USA.
- Reserva Forestal de Maricao, Puerto Rico, USA.
- Los Tres Picachos State Forest, Puerto Rico, USA.
- Virgin Islands National Park, U.S. Virgin Islands, USA.
- El Yunque National Forest, Puerto Rico, USA.

== See also ==
- List of reptiles of Puerto Rico
- List of endemic fauna of Puerto Rico
- List of Anolis lizards
