= Los Tres Picachos State Forest =

Forest in Puerto Rico

Coordinates: 18.215°N 66.536°W

Los Tres Picachos State Forest Spanish: Bosque Estatal de Los Tres Picachos
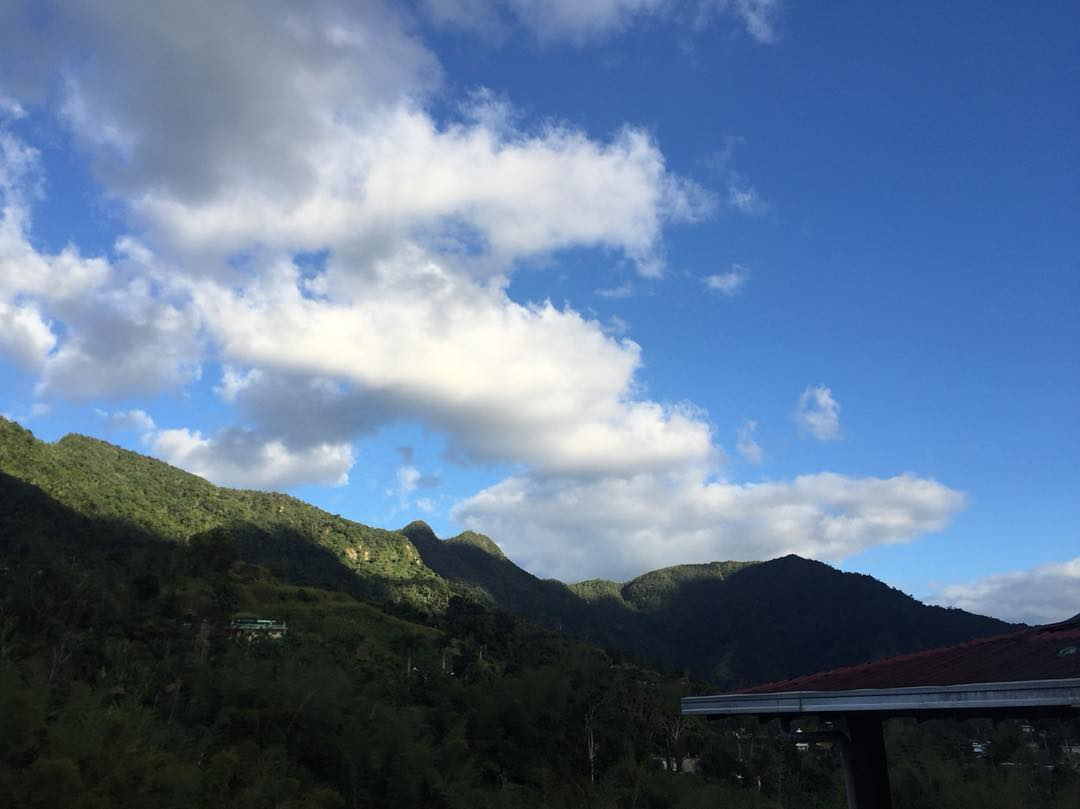
- View of Los Tres Picachos mountain from Coabey, Jayuya.

Map
- Interactive map of Los Tres Picachos State Forest

Geography
- Location: Ciales and Jayuya
- Elevation: 3,895 feet (1,187 m)
- Area: 2,289 acres (2,357 cda)

Administration
- Status: Public, Commonwealth
- Governing body: Puerto Rico Department of Natural and Environmental Resources (DRNA)
- Website: www.drna.pr.gov

Ecology
- WWF Classification: Puerto Rican moist forests

Los Tres Picachos State Forest (Spanish: Bosque Estatal de Los Tres Picachos) is one of the 20 forests that make up the public forest system of Puerto Rico. The forest is located in the Central Mountain Range or Cordillera Central, along the Los Tres Picachos mountain ridge, one of the island's highest mountains, named after the distinctive three peaks of the highest mountain in the forest. The state forest is located in the municipalities of Jayuya and Ciales.

== History ==
Los Tres Picachos State Forest was proclaimed and designated on February 16, 1999, through executive order OE-199-10. This proclamation was made thanks to effort and interest from local residents, the municipal administrations of Ciales and Jayuya, and the Guardianes de la Montaña ecological group. Its purpose is to preserve the ecological integrity of the forest terrains from urban development.

== Geography ==
The forest is found along two river basins: the Arecibo and Manatí Rivers, both flowing northward into the Atlantic Ocean. Other rivers found within the forest boundaries are the Cialitos, Saliente and Toro Negro rivers. The forest is particularly vital for the hydrological preservation of the Toro Negro River. The most notable geographical feature of the forest reserve is the Tres Picachos mountain which rises to an elevation of 3,176 feet (968 m) above sea level. Tres Picachos literally translates to three little peaks, and it is named as such after the three distinctive peaks found in the summit of the mountain.

The state forest is found in a transition zone between a karstic area and another of volcanic origin.

== Ecology ==
The forest is divided into three forest zones: the subtropical broadleaf forest, the montane or cloud forest and the tropical humid or rain forest. The ecological biomes found in the forest are the dwarf forest (above 1,090 meters over sea level), the Sierra palm tree forest (between 850 and 1,090 meters above sea level), the tabonuco tree forest (between 700 and 850 meters), and the secondary forest found in former coffee plantation areas which have now been reclaimed by nature.

=== Flora ===
Some of the plant species found in the forest are the western cherry laurel or almendron (Prunus occidentalis), the tabloncillo tree (Sideroxylon portoricense), the moca tree (Andira inermis), the granadillo tree (Buchenavia capitata), the Puerto Rican magnolia (Magnolia portoricensis), the nutget or nemoca tree (Ocotea moschata), the candlewood or tabonuco tree (Dacryodes excelsa), the Sierra palm tree (Prestoea montana), and the invasive African tulip tree (Spathodea campanulata) which is found mostly in the secondary or second-growth forest area. The forest is also home to epiphytic plants such as bromeliads and orchids.

=== Fauna ===
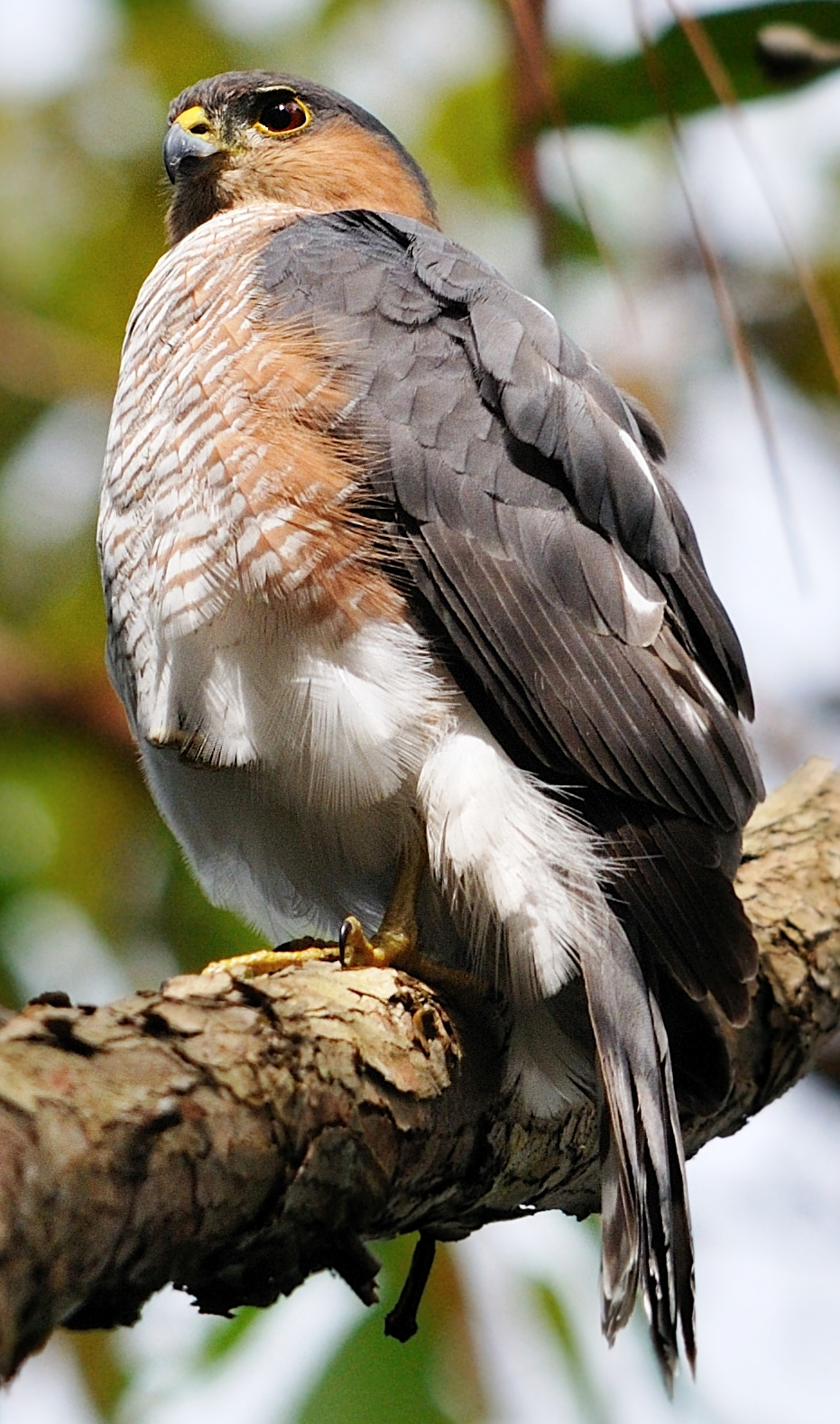
The endangered Puerto Rican Sharp-shinned hawk can be found in the forest.

The forest is rich in animal species and it is home to a large number of endemic species. Together with other state forests and protected natural areas of the Puerto Rican Central Mountain Range, Los Tres Picachos forest has been a recognized component of the Cordillera Central Important Bird Area since 2007.

The following are some of the species found in the forest and its rivers.

==== Fish ====
- Mountain mullet (Dajaus monticola, Spanish: dajao)
- American eel (Anguilla rostrata, Spanish: anguila americana)
- Violet goby (Gobioides broussonnetii, Spanish: chupa-piedra)
- Bigmouth sleeper (Gobiomorus dormitor, Spanish: guavina)
- Sirajo goby (Sicydium plumieri, Spanish: olivo or ceti)

==== Amphibians ====
- Red-eyed coqui (Eleutherodactylus antillensis, Spanish: churí or coquí churí)
- Grass coqui (Eleutherodactylus brittoni, Spanish: coquí de las hierbas)
- Whistling coqui (Eleutherodactylus cochranae, Spanish: coquí pitito)
- Common coqui (Eleutherodactylus coqui, Spanish: coquí or coquí común)
- Cricket coqui (Eleutherodactylus gryllus, Spanish: coquí grillo)
- Mountain or upland coqui (Eleutherodactylus portoricensis, Spanish: coquí de montaña)
- Melodious coqui (Eleutherodactylus wightmanae, Spanish: coquí melodioso)

==== Reptiles ====
- Puerto Rican crested anole (Anolis cristatellus, Spanish: lagartijo común)
- Emerald anole (Anolis evermanni, Spanish: lagartijo verde)
- Yellow-bearded anole (Anolis gundlachi, Spanish: lagartijo de barba amarilla)
- Krug's anole (Anolis krugi, Spanish: lagartijo de montaña)
- Dwarf anole or Puerto Rican twig anole (Anolis occultus, Spanish: lagartijo enano)
- Puerto Rican anole (Anolis pulchellus, Spanish: lagartijo de jardín)
- Puerto Rican spotted anole (Anolis stratulus, Spanish: lagartijo manchado or colloquially camaleón)
- Puerto Rican boa (Chilabothrus inornatus, Spanish: boa puertorriqueña or culebrón puertorriqueño)
- Puerto Rican galliwasp (Diploglossus pleii, Spanish: culebrita de cuatro patas)

==== Birds ====
- Puerto Rican sharp-shinned hawk (Accipiter striatus venator, Spanish: falcón de sierra or gavilán pecho rufo)
- Puerto Rican broad-winged hawk (Buteo platypterus brunnescens, Spanish: gavilán de bosque or guaraguao de bosque)
- Orange-cheeked waxbill (Estrilda melpoda, Spanish: finche veterano), introduced
- Venezuelan troupial (Icterus icterus, Spanish: turpial), introduced
- Puerto Rican woodpecker (Melanerpes portoricensis, Spanish: carpintero puertorriqueño)
- Puerto Rican bullfinch (Melopyrrha portoricensis, Spanish: comeñame)
- Ovenbird (Seiurus aurocapilla, Spanish: pizpita dorada), migratory
- Cape May warbler (Setophaga tigrina, Spanish: reinita tigre), migratory
- Puerto Rican spindalis (Spindalis portoricensis, Spanish: reina mora)
- Puerto Rican tody (Todus mexicanus, Spanish: San Pedrito or medio peso)
- Puerto Rican vireo (Vireo latimeri, Spanish: bien-te-veo)

==== Mammals ====
- Greater Antillean long-tongued bat (Monophyllus redmani, Spanish: murciélago lengüilargo)

== Recreation ==
The forest currently does not have infrastructure for the purpose of recreation and there is no parking or sanitary services either. There is however a single trail that leads to two of the three peaks of Los Tres Picachos mountain summit. Coabey in Jayuya is the closest town to the forest and it can be accessed by PR-10 and PR-123 roads from Ponce.

A famous sight within the forest is the Las Delicias Falls (Cascada Las Delicias), a series of waterfalls found along the Cialitos River. The main waterfall can be accessed through PR-149 by a short scramble through rocks, however parking in the area is highly limited with there being only four spots to park.

== See also ==
- List of state forests in Puerto Rico
- Carite State Forest
- Toro Negro State Forest
