= Plasmodium azurophilum =

Scientific classification
- Domain: Eukaryota
- Clade: Sar
- Clade: Alveolata
- Phylum: Apicomplexa
- Class: Aconoidasida
- Order: Haemospororida
- Family: Plasmodiidae
- Genus: Plasmodium
- Species: P. azurophilum

Binomial name
- Plasmodium azurophilum Telford, 1975

Species of single-celled organism

Plasmodium azurophilum is a species of the genus Plasmodium. Like all species in this genus it is a parasite of both vertebrates and insects. The vertebrate hosts are anole lizards.

== Description ==
This species was described by Telford in 1975.

It has been suggested that P. azurophilum represents more than one species with one species infecting red blood cells and the other infecting white blood cells.

== Hosts ==
Plasmodium azurophilum has been described in many species of Anolis. Species known to be infected are Anolis cristatellus, Anolis evermanni, Anolis gingivinus, Anolis gundlachi, Anolis krugi, Anolis oculatus, Anolis roquet, Anolis sabanus, and Anolis stratulus.

Median parasitaemia rates in infections tend to be low (<0.5%).

== Geographic location ==
This parasite is found in the eastern Caribbean.
