= Banded anole =

There are two species of lizard named banded anole:

- Anolis stratulus, found in Puerto Rico, the United States Virgin Islands, and the British Virgin Islands
- Anolis fasciatus, found in Ecuador and Colombia
