= Steven Cay, United States Virgin Islands =

Island in the United States Virgin Islands

Steven Cay
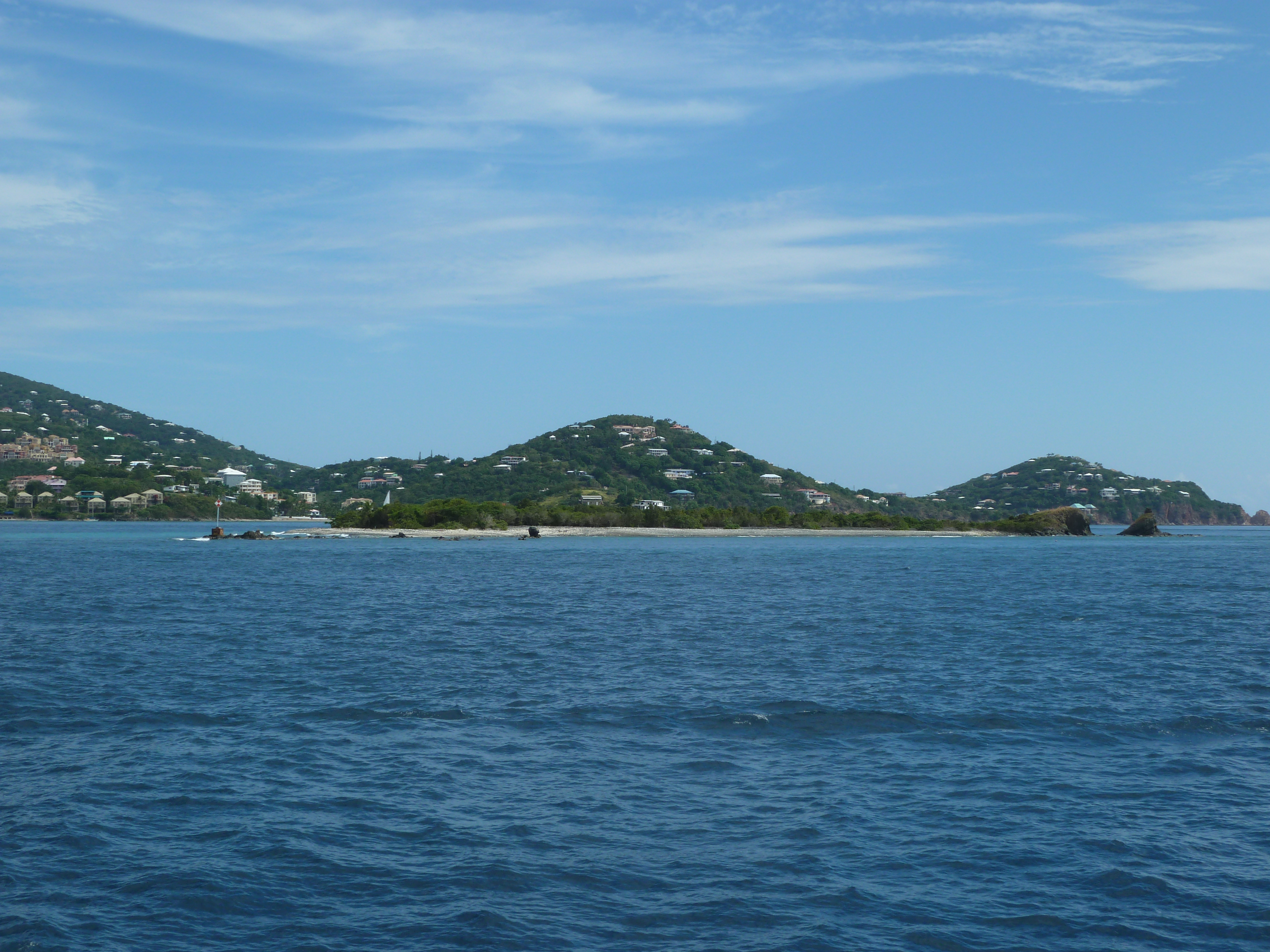
- Low-lying Steven Cay in front of St. John, 2010.

- Location in the Caribbean Steven Cay, United States Virgin Islands (the Caribbean)

Geography
- Location: Caribbean Sea
- Coordinates: 18°19′48″N 64°48′26″W

Administration
- United States
- Insular area: United States Virgin Islands

Steven Cay (sometimes spelled Steven May or Meeren Cay) is a small scrub-covered and rocky Caribbean island, about 28 feet high and situated 0.5 miles west of Cruz Bay on Saint John in the United States Virgin Islands. It is a popular destination for snorkelers and scuba divers.

== Flora and fauna ==
Steven Cay waters feature coral reefs and sea fans, mountain corals, star corals, large quantities of angel- and triggerfish, as well as lobsters, nurse sharks and pillar corals.

== Slave Rebellion of 1733 ==
During the slave rebellion of 1733 on St. John, Meeren Cay was one of the places the refugees fled to for safety and to be rescued.
