= Anolis desechensis =

Scientific classification
- Kingdom: Animalia
- Phylum: Chordata
- Class: Reptilia
- Order: Squamata
- Suborder: Iguania
- Family: Dactyloidae
- Genus: Anolis
- Species: A. desechensis

Binomial name
- Anolis desechensis Heatwole, 1976

Species of lizard

Anolis desechensis, the Desecheo anole or Heatwole's anole, is a species of lizard in the family Dactyloidae. The species is found on Desecheo Island in Puerto Rico.
