= Trunk Cay, United States Virgin Islands =

Island in the United States Virgin Islands

Trunk Cay
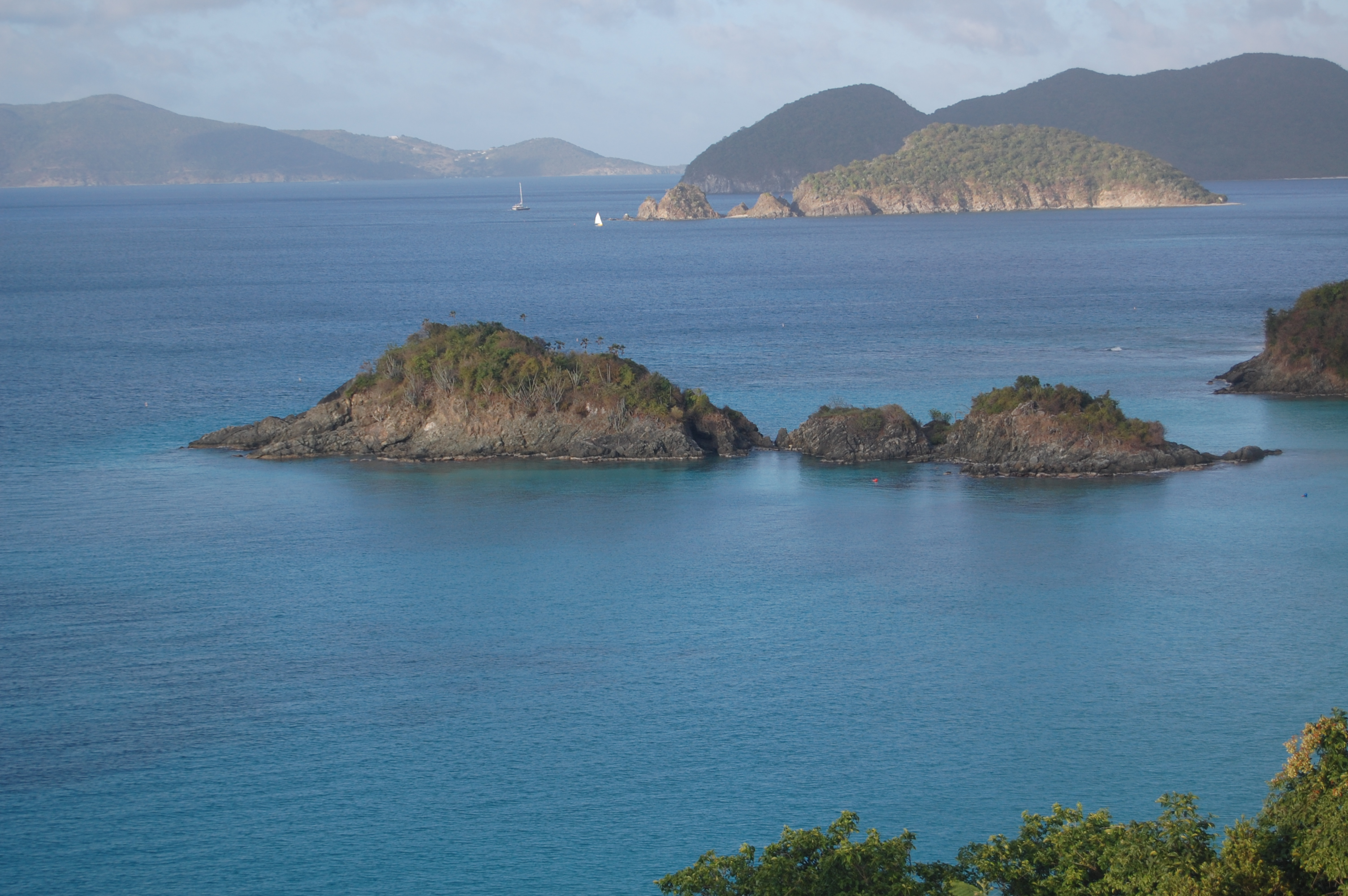
- Trunk Cay (foreground), as seen from an overlook.

- Location in the Caribbean Trunk Cay, United States Virgin Islands (the Caribbean)

Geography
- Location: Caribbean Sea
- Coordinates: 18°21′18″N 64°46′07″W

Administration
- United States
- Insular area: United States Virgin Islands

Trunk Cay is a small grass-covered islet in Trunk Bay in the United States Virgin Islands. It has an elevation of 48 feet and is situated only 200 feet from Trunk Bay Beach. It is an islet of rocky cliffs, coral sandy beaches, and palm trees. The Virgin Islands National Park Service offers underwater snorkelling trails around the cay. Trunk Cay is named for the leatherback turtle, which is found in the U.S.V.I. and is locally known as trunks. The leatherbacks can be as long as 6 feet in length and weigh up to 2,000 pounds.
