= Thatch Cay, U.S. Virgin Islands =

Island in the United States Virgin Islands

Thatch Cay
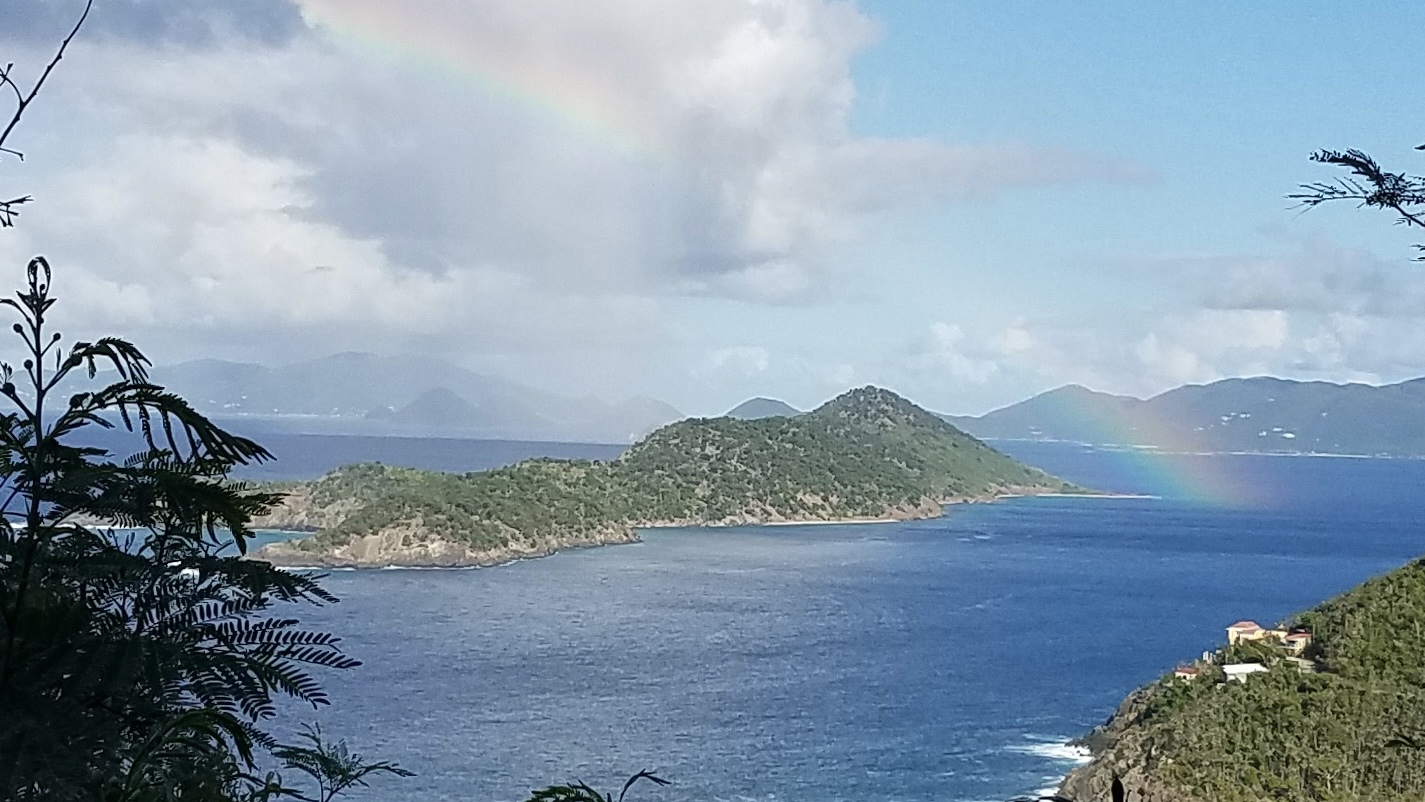

- Location within the U.S. Virgin Islands Location within Lesser Antilles Location within the Caribbean

Geography
- Location: Caribbean Sea
- Coordinates: 18.359°N 64.856°W
- Archipelago: Virgin Islands, Leeward Islands
- Area: 230 acres (93 ha)

Administration
- United States; United States Virgin Islands
- Insular area: Virgin Islands

Thatch Cay is a small, uninhabited 230 acre (931,000 m²) island one-half mile (0.8 kilometres) off the northeastern coast of Saint Thomas. Its highest peak is 482 feet (147 metres). It is one of the last privately held, undeveloped islands in the U.S. Virgin Islands.

== History ==
The island is named after the Tyre palms, Coccothrinax alta, which are found in thick patches on the island and which slaves would use to make sacks and roofing for their buildings. From 1804, it was owned by the Reyck family of Denmark, which were the first inhabitants, and was home to a small plantation called "The Hope" which consisted of fourteen members of the family and two slaves. It is not known exactly when the family relinquished ownership of the island but it is thought to be around the time of purchase of almost the whole chain by the U.S. Government in 1917. In the mid 1900s a small fishing village consisting of 6 small structures was located on the island, as well as a small copper mine. Stone ruins of these structures can still be seen to this day. The cay has also historically been known for the Panulirus argus lobsters which are found around the island in large numbers.

=== Recent development ===
In 2000 Thatch Cay was contracted for purchase from the U.S. Virgin Islands Territory Court by Scott McIntyre of Idealight VI LLC as part of Idealight's Luxury Property Development and Corporate Tourism practice. With only 6 planned estates, McIntyre's private, highly eco-friendly design for Thatch Cay included solar powered island-wide wireless networks hubbed in the "lodge" to offer residents both family holiday and corporate use. In 2003 McIntyre turned over the project to a San Diego firm which started selling the island.
