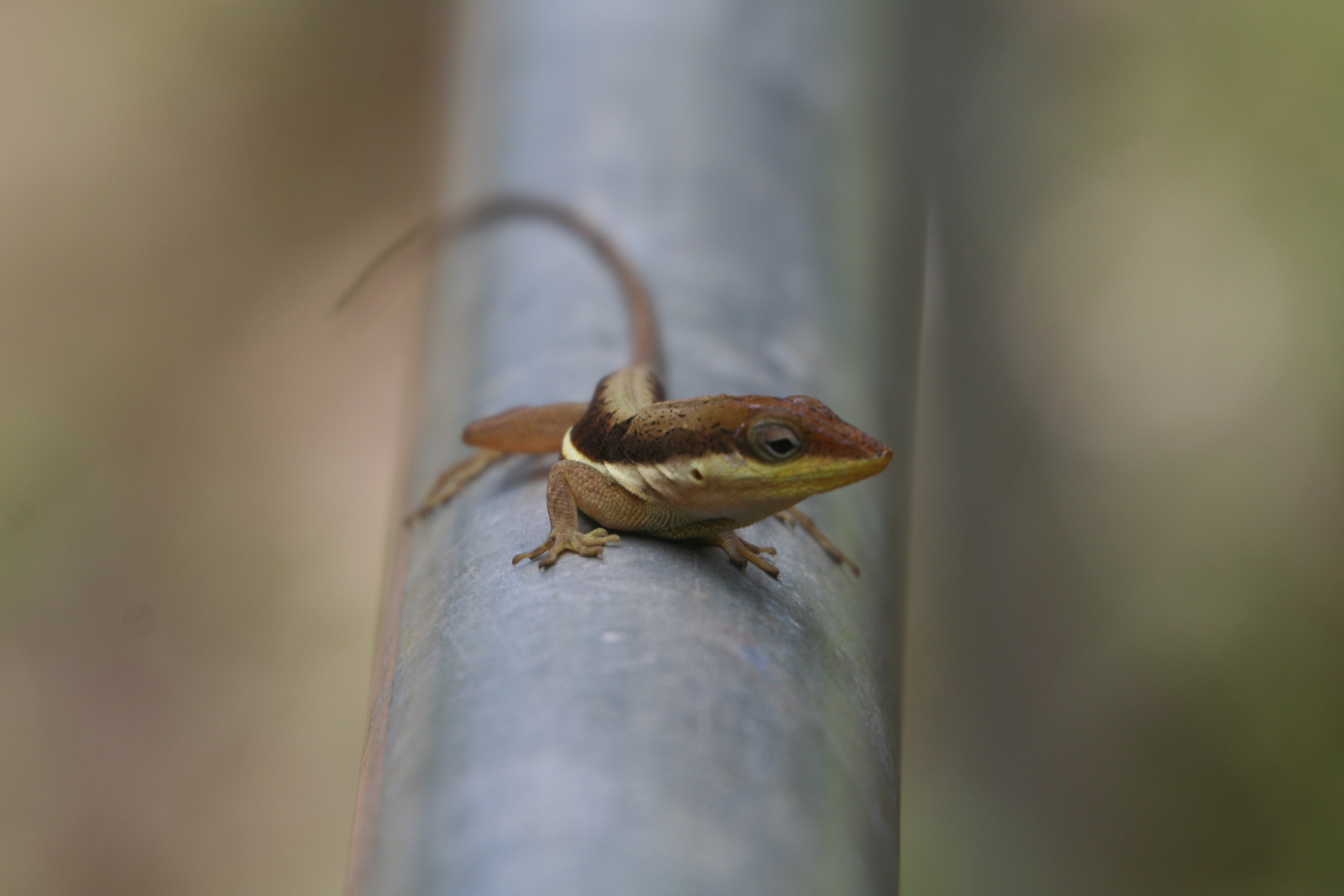

Conservation status
- Least Concern (IUCN 3.1)

Scientific classification
- Kingdom: Animalia
- Phylum: Chordata
- Class: Reptilia
- Order: Squamata
- Suborder: Iguania
- Family: Dactyloidae
- Genus: Anolis
- Species: A. krugi

Binomial name
- Anolis krugi W. Peters, 1877

Synonyms
- Ctenonotus krugi (W. Peters, 1877)

= Anolis krugi =

Species of lizard

Anolis krugi, also known commonly as Krug's anole, the olive bush anole, and the orange dewlap anole, is a species of lizard in the family Dactyloidae. The species is endemic to Puerto Rico.

== Etymology ==
The specific name, krugi, is in honor of German botanist Karl Wilhelm Leopold Krug, co-collector of the holotype.

== Description ==
The holotype of A. krugi has a total length of 17 cm (6.7 in), including the tail which is more than twice the length of the head and body.

== Habitat ==
The preferred natural habitat of A. krugi is forest, at altitudes from sea level to 1,200 m (3,900 ft).

== Diet ==
A. krugi preys upon invertebrates.

== Reproduction ==
A. krugi is oviparous.

== Taxonomy ==
A. krugi is a member of the Anolis cristatellus species group.
