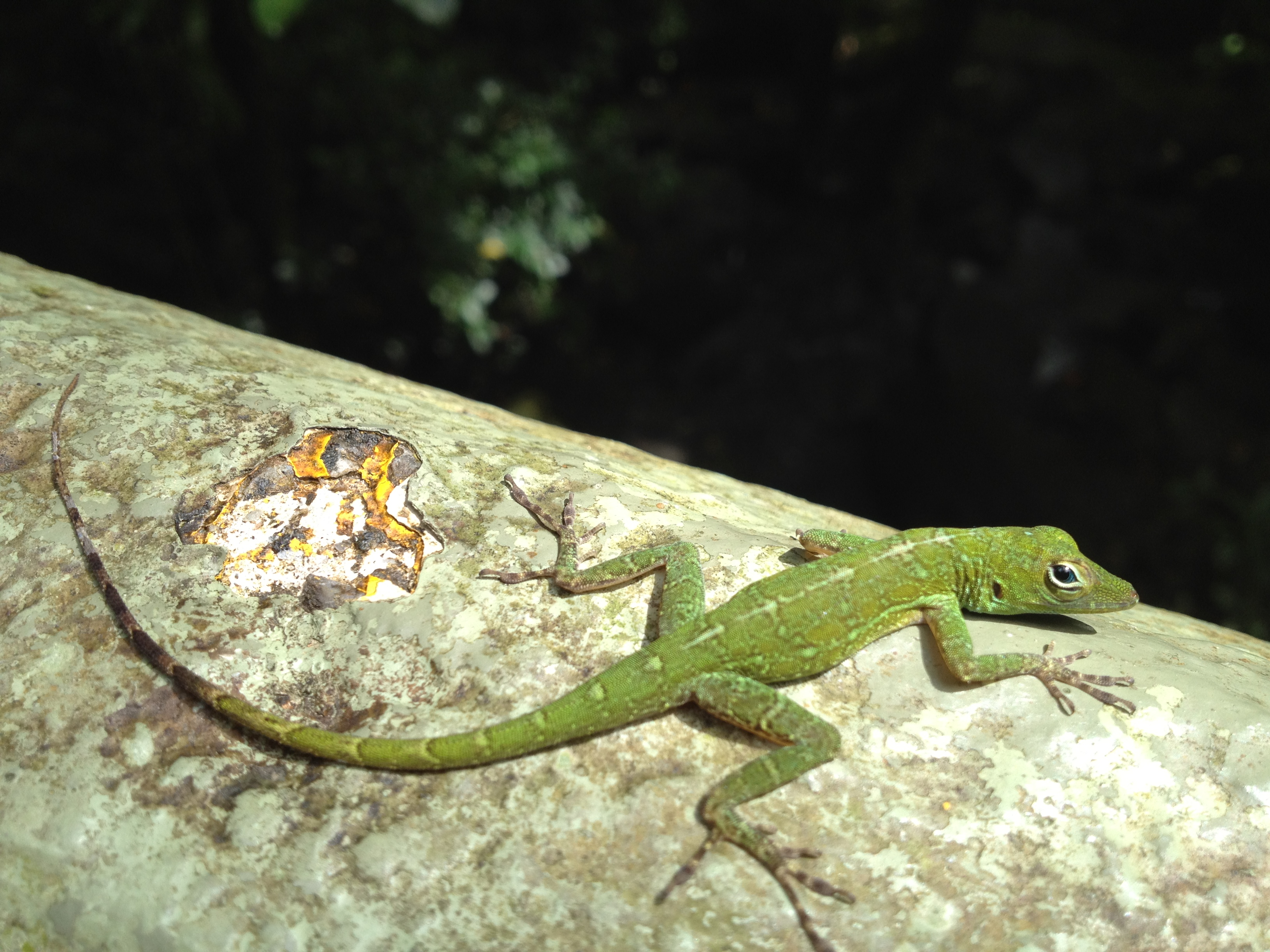

Conservation status
- Least Concern (IUCN 3.1)

Scientific classification
- Kingdom: Animalia
- Phylum: Chordata
- Class: Reptilia
- Order: Squamata
- Suborder: Iguania
- Family: Anolidae
- Genus: Anolis
- Species: A. evermanni

Binomial name
- Anolis evermanni Stejneger, 1904

= Anolis evermanni =

Species of lizard

Anolis evermanni, also known commonly as the emerald anole, Evermann's anole, and the small green anole, is a species of lizard included within the family Dactyloidae. A. evermanni is native to Puerto Rico, where it is mainly found in wet forests. A. evermanni is a medium-sized lizard and bright emerald-green in color. A. evermanni is studied for its behavior as well as the evolution of the family Dactyloidae. The group of lizards which are member species of the family Dactyloidae are known as anoles. Anoles are found throughout the Americas and are related to iguanas.

== Description ==
A. evermanni is medium-sized and a bright emerald-green color, but can also progress to a dark brown color when aroused. Males are typically larger than females with males having a snout-to-vent length of 7 cm (2.8 in) and females having a snout-to-vent length of 4.5 cm (1.8 in). They have a flattened body and head, slightly compressed tail, pointy snout, short legs, and large toe-pads. Males and females both have a yellow dewlap, a flap of skin hanging below the neck. Male dewlaps are generally larger than female dewlaps.

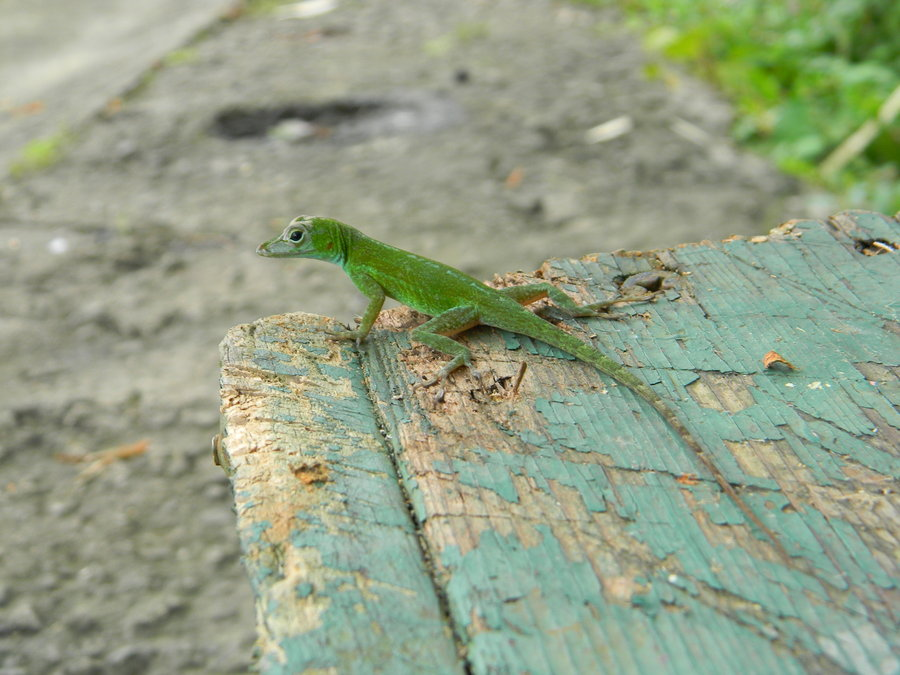
Anolis evermanni on a beach

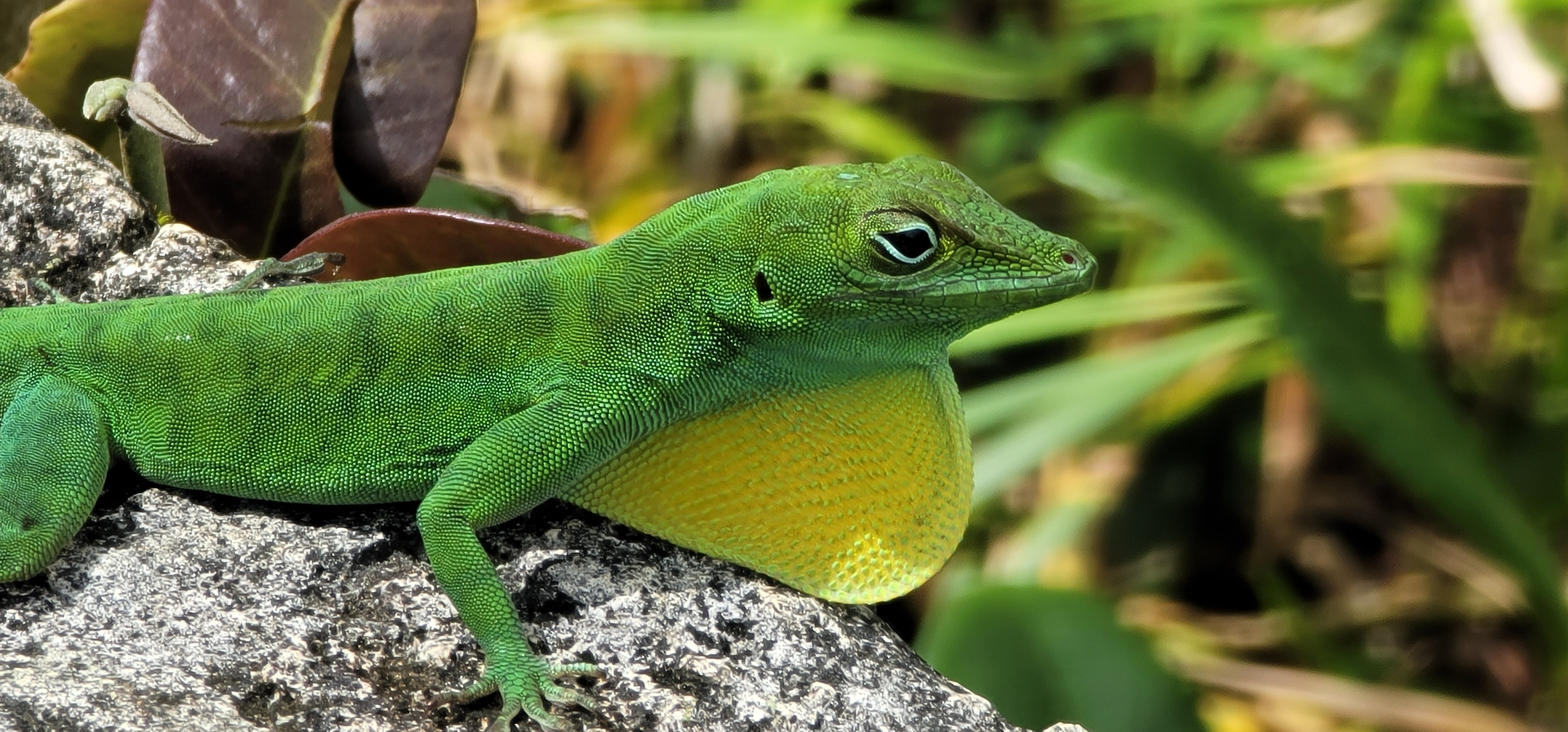
Anolis evermanni with extended dewlap

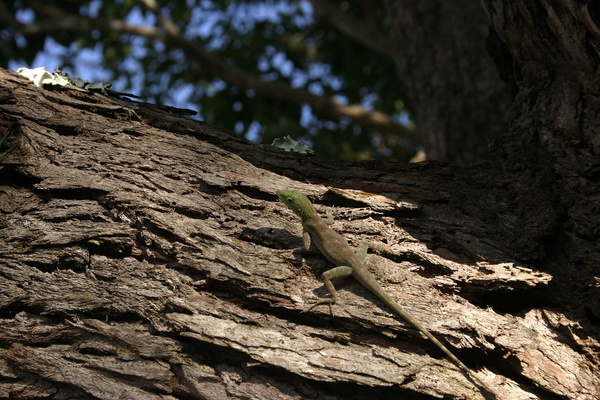
Brown Anolis evermanni

== Distribution and habitat ==
A. evermanni is native to and found in Puerto Rico. Specifically, it can be found in wet forests including the El Yunque rainforest, the Luquillo mountains and forest, and the Cordillera Central mountain range.

In these areas, A. evermanni is typically found around trees, on rocks, or bamboo groves. It mainly use the upper portions of trees, 2 m (6.6 ft) above the ground, as perching sites and to search for food. Its short legs and large toe-pads allow it to move more easily in the upper portions of trees, particularly on small branches.

== Conservation ==
The International Union for Conservation of Nature lists A. evermanni as a least-concern species as the species remains common in Puerto Rico, and its habitat has no widespread threats. Current threats include residential and commercial development as A. evermanni is not found in deforested areas. Additionally, climate change is a threat to forest habitats in which A. evermanni is found.

No species-specific conservation efforts are taking place for A. evermanni. However, it is most often found in protected areas which conserve its natural habitats.

== History and taxonomy ==
A. evermanni is a species of lizard named after Dr. Barton Warren Evermann, an American ichthyologist.

A. evermanni is in the anole genus Anolis, which includes over 400 species of lizards native to the Americas. Anoles typically share similar sizes and shapes but differ in the habitats they occupy. This is an example of adaptive radiation as lizards on different islands adapt to different habitats. The genus Anolis is part of the larger family Dactyloidae of anoles. This is an example of convergent evolution where lizards on different islands with similar habitats may evolve to share similar morphologies.

Within the genus Anolis, A. evermanni is classified in the trunk-crown ecomorph, generally living in the upper trunks and canopies of trees. Other trunk-crown anoles include A. allisoni, A. coelestinus, and A. grahami.

A. carolinensis is another related lizard species which is also able to change colors between shades of green and brown.

=== Genome ===
From 65 to 125 million years ago, anoles experienced radiation into the different species found today. Anoles vary greatly in their karyotypes with A. evermanni having a diploid number of 26 chromosomes while other anoles having a diploid number as large as 44. They also vary in their sex chromosomes with some species having simple XX/XY sex chromosomes and others having many sex chromosomes.

== Diet ==
Similar to other trunk-crown Anolis ecomorphs, A. evermanni eats small insects. A. evermanni has also been found to eat the nectar of Mecranium latifolium flowers in Puerto Rican forests. This is a recent finding, but other anoles have also been found to lick nectar from flowers. Some anoles may be pollinators of certain flowers. When foraging, similar to other anoles, A. evermanni is typically a sit-and-wait forager, meaning it has long periods of inactivity followed by short bursts of activity to capture prey.

== Reproduction and life cycle ==
=== Reproduction ===
A. evermanni females display seasonal changes in egg production. From April to September, most A. evermanni individuals are reproductive, and many females have two oviducal eggs. Almost no reproduction occurs between November and January. Like other anoles, A. evermanni females lay eggs and hide them.

== Behavior ==
A. evermanni, in addition to other anoles, has been studied for its behavioral interactions and evolution.

=== Territoriality ===
A. evermanni is a territorial species, with both males and females using displays of their dewlaps, tails, and tongues to defend their territory from other lizards. When these displays fail, A. evermanni may also fight over territory.

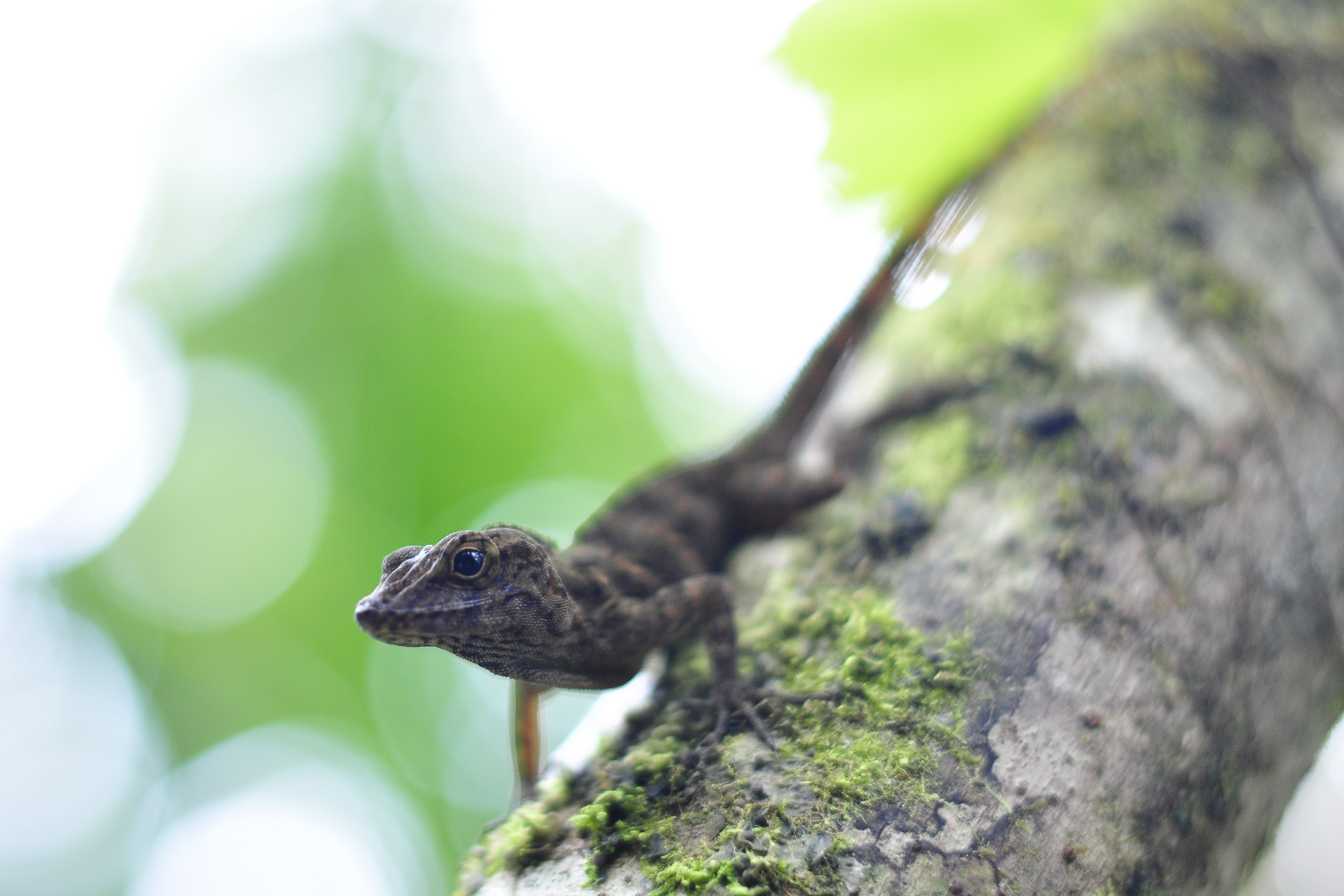
Anolis gundlachi, a competitor of Anolis evermanni

=== Competition with Anolis gundlachi ===
A. evermanni has been found to interact with other lizard species including A. gundlachi. Both lizard species are native to Puerto Rico and they are of similar sizes. However, they are ecologically different as A. gundlachi typically occupies the lower portions of trees while A. evermanni occupies upper tree areas. Regardless, competition between the two lizard species still exists. In a study on the interactions between the two species, when A. gundlachi is removed from an environment, the number of A. evermanni was found to increase over time. This may be due to interspecific competition between the two lizard species. The two lizard species share similar prey of insects and have been found to contest territory. Similar to behavioral displays between A. evermanni lizards, with two different species, the lizards also use push-ups, their dewlaps and tongues to compete for territory and prey. In this case, A. gundlachi has been found to win encounters over A. evermanni counterparts. Intraguild predation is also possible among these lizards with male A. gundlachi adults potentially eating A. evermanni juveniles. Without the competition with A. gundlachi, A. evermanni was able to occupy areas, mainly lower tree trunks, that were previously defended by A. gundlachi.

Other possible hypotheses regarding the ecological differences between A. evermanni and A. gundlachi include having common predators and parasites. But in this case, as the two lizard species are in close distance to each other, it is unlikely that these factors have a significant role.

=== Biting ===
A. evermanni, as well as other anoles, bite other animals and humans. However, most anole bites are harmless and only done as a protective measure when provoked.

=== Coloration and behavior ===
A. evermanni is typically bright emerald-green which does not blend in well with tree trunks but may blend well with other vegetation. However, when aroused, A. evermanni will turn a dark brown color which may camouflage it with tree trunks.

=== Problem solving ===
A. evermanni has been studied to test its behavioral flexibility. Lizards are believed to have limited cognitive abilities. However, in a study with A. evermanni, the lizard was found to adjust its behavior in order to receive a reward. In this case, lizards learned to remove a disc in order to obtain food. This study demonstrated adaptation capabilities within A. evermanni.

However, whether this behavior can accurately assess behavioral flexibility has been disputed. Other researchers contend that A. evermanni has demonstrated learning abilities but not necessarily a flexible learning ability.

== Enemies ==
=== Predators ===
Predators of A. evermanni include terrestrial predators like snakes. A. evermanni may also perceive humans as predators, and other animals like birds may be predators as well. As it is typically found on or near trees, when approached by a terrestrial predator, A. evermanni exhibits escape behavior by climbing around or up a tree. This behavior varies depending on the perch height of the A. evermanni individual. If a lizard is lower in a tree, the lizard exhibits escape behavior more quickly when approached by a predator than if the lizard were higher in the tree. At perch heights less than or exactly 2.0 m (6.6 ft), A. evermanni individuals exhibit escape behavior, but at perch heights above 2.0 m, no escape behavior is exhibited.

== Physiology ==
=== Locomotion ===
A. evermanni locomotion depends on location, showcasing different movement on boulders and trees. A. evermanni exhibits jumping and walking behavior at similar levels on boulders and trees. However, running behavior is increased 238% on trees. Overall locomotion for A. evermanni is 46% higher on trees. Its short legs and large toe-pads aid locomotion on trees. Another possible explanation for increased running and movement on trees is that tree trunks provide a continuous area for A. evermanni to move on. Additionally, A. evermanni is heliophilic and may move toward areas with sunlight including the forest canopy and gaps in the canopy where sunlight can reach.

== Interactions with humans ==
A. evermanni is often found on coffee plantations in Puerto Rico, especially in areas nearby forests. A. evermanni is being affected by human activity and forest conversion in its natural habitats as it does not continue to live in deforested areas. A. evermanni has not been found to have other significant interactions with humans and is not involved with major human uses or trade.
