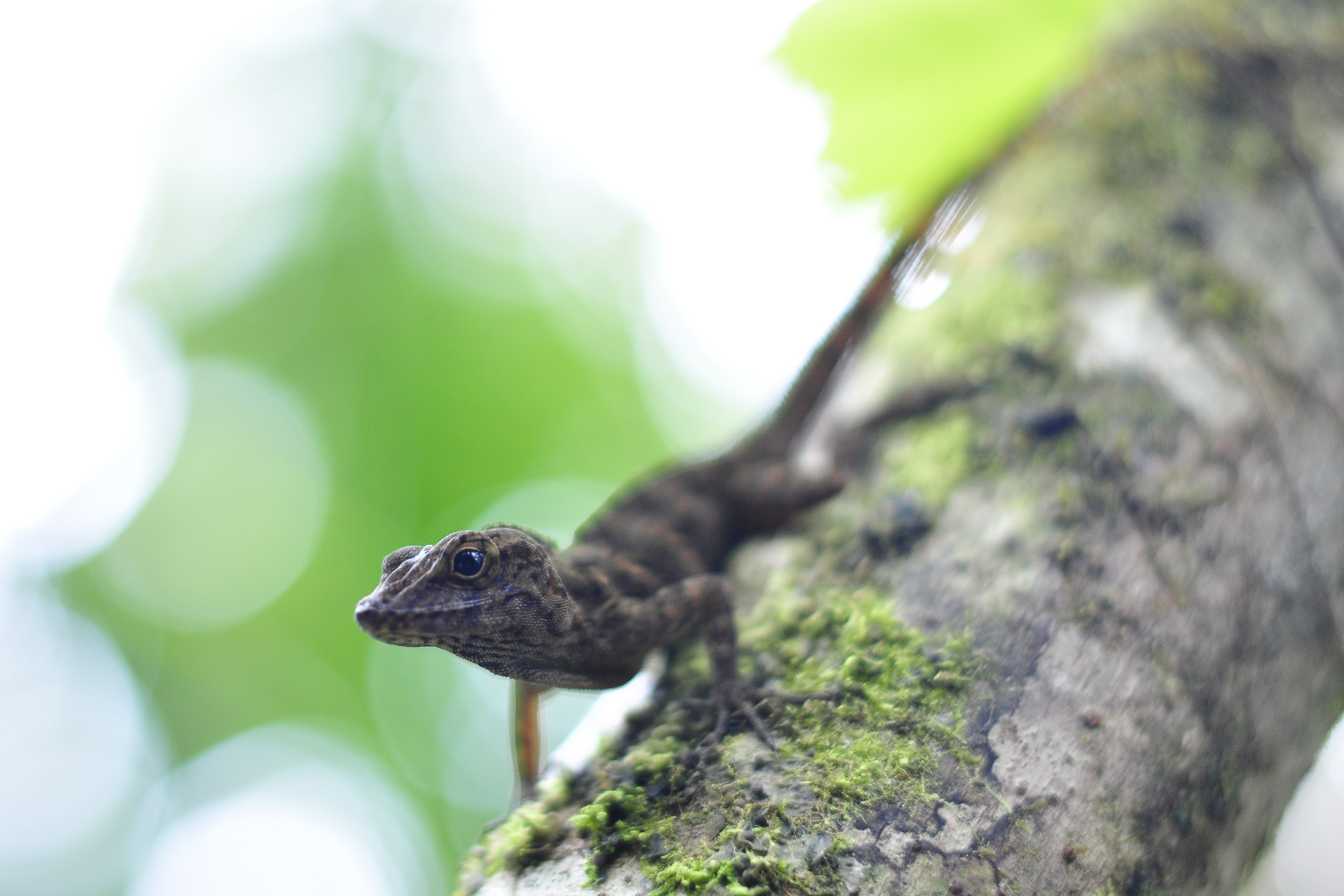

Conservation status
- Least Concern (IUCN 3.1)

Scientific classification
- Kingdom: Animalia
- Phylum: Chordata
- Class: Reptilia
- Order: Squamata
- Suborder: Iguania
- Family: Dactyloidae
- Genus: Anolis
- Species: A. gundlachi

Binomial name
- Anolis gundlachi W. Peters, 1877

= Anolis gundlachi =

Species of lizard

Anolis gundlachi, also commonly known as the yellow-chinned anole, Gundlach's anole, and the yellow-beard anole, is an oviparous, sexually dimorphic species of lizard in the family Dactyloidae. The species is endemic to Puerto Rico and lives in mountainous forests at high elevations. The diet of A. gundlachi consists mostly of insects. This species is also known for signaling other lizards through a modulated head bob display, with varying bobbing amplitudes and patterns based on an individual's distance from other lizards.

== Etymology ==
The specific name, gundlachi, is in honor of German-Cuban zoologist Juan Gundlach.

== Description ==
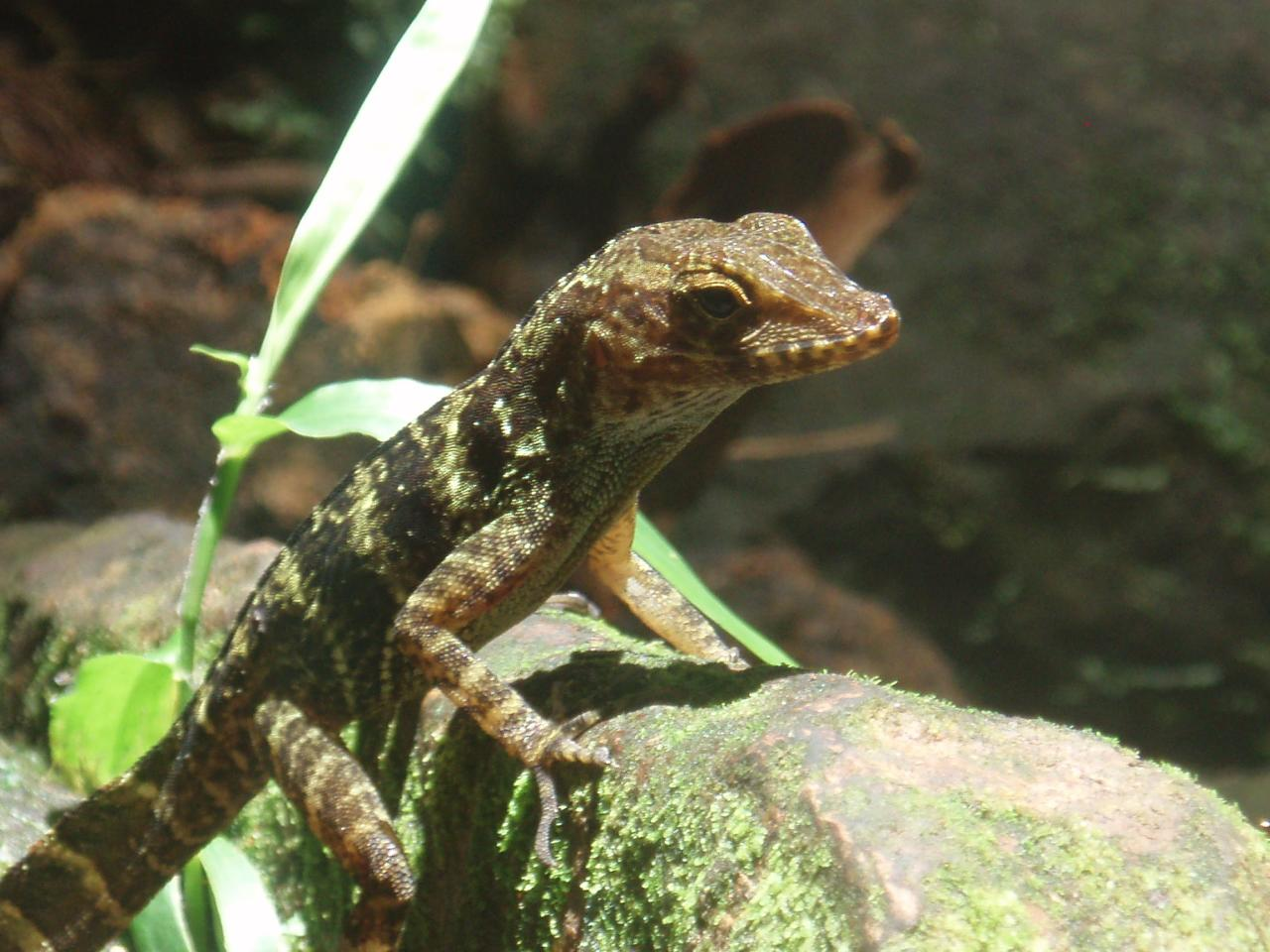

A. gundlachi is a medium-sized, sexually dimorphic lizard. Adult males have a snout-to-vent length (SVL) of 68 mm (2.7 in) and females have a snout-to-vent length of 45 mm (1.8 in). Adult body weight is three to seven grams. The body is a brown or olive-brown color with brown spots randomly along its length. This species also has a yellow-brown dewlap and blue eyes. Males have crested tails.

== Habitat and distribution ==
A. gundlachi is native to Puerto Rico and is found in the inner rainforests of the Luquillo mountains in northeastern Puerto Rico. The lizard lives at altitudes between 244 and 1,158 m (800 and 3,800 ft). A. gundlachi is a trunk-ground lizard, meaning it mainly lives and perches on the lower regions of large tree trunks. In fact, it rarely climbs higher than 5 m (16 ft) from the ground. Preference for wide, woody vegetation helps the lizard remain hidden from predators, allows for better locomotion, and aids in scanning more area of its territory.

== Home range and territoriality ==
=== Home range ===
Individuals of A. gundlachi have been observed to return to relatively the same location to sleep on a nightly basis. This suggests that A. gundlachi reserves a specific area in its territory as its designated sleep-site. 15 minutes before sunset, the individual approaches its sleep site, where it then lies horizontally on the leaf with its snout pointed toward the stem and remains there until dawn. Being immobile on the leaf is helpful for avoiding predation since A. gundlachi that are displaced from their sleeping sites are preyed upon by nocturnal predators.

The plants the lizard chooses as sleep sites are usually adult trees taller than 1 m (3.3 ft) with woody stems and branches. Sleep-sites are based on availability and not a specific attribute of the plant itself. Only lizards with a snout-to-vent length (SVL) above 40 mm (1.6 in) used plants taller than one meter. There is also a positive correlation between the height of the sleep-site and lizard size. This suggests that juveniles behave differently from adults in terms of the height of their sleep-sites on a plant.

=== Territoriality ===
Males display territorial behavior by patrolling around their territory and defend their perch against other A. gundlachi males. Body condition is not a significant predictor of territory and home range size in male A. gundlachi.

Field observations from 2015 to 2016 also found that females display territorial behavior as well, though with smaller home ranges than male A. gundlachi. Female body condition does not correlate to territory sizes. One hypothesis states that larger territories invite a greater risk of predation, particularly for females. This suggests that the size of a territory should not be the sole consideration towards its value: territory location and its circumscribed resources may contribute to territory selection and defense as well. A second hypothesis states that larger territories invite a greater risk of predation, particularly for females. Females also exhibited high site fidelity with aggressive behaviors towards other A. gundlachi individuals encroaching upon that territory. Additionally, female A. gundlachi exhibited push-up behavior, which is hypothesized to be a display of ownership of a territory. Aggressive behavior relating to territoriality in female A. gundlachi did occur at a lower rate than aggressive territorial behavior in males.

== Ecology ==
=== Diet ===
A. gundlachi is mainly an insectivore, eating large insects and arthropods. However, this lizard is known to have powerful jaws and has been observed to eat other anoles, small frogs, and snails. Other prey includes ants, sowbugs, and mayflies.

=== Predators ===
Predators of A. gundlachi include the Puerto Rican boa, the common coqui, and the Puerto Rican lizard cuckoo. The presence of these predators makes their defense mechanisms essential to their survival.

=== Diseases and parasites ===
The malarial parasite Plasmodium commonly infects lizards as hosts. In particular, P. floridense and P. azurophilium exploit A. gundlachi as shown in a study where 30% of individuals captured in a 2000 study had active parasitic infections from these two species. Percentage of lizards infected can vary between sex and body size so that males are infected more than females.

== Reproduction and lifestyle ==
A. gundlachi is an oviparous lizard, meaning offspring hatch out of an egg after being laid by the mother.

== Mating signaling and displays ==
A. gundlachi males use square wave-like motion head bobs and dewlap flashes as a display for courtship or challenges against other males. Males modulate the amplitude of their head bob according to their distance from another potentially inattentive lizard. This specific motion is used and modulated to be attuned to the properties of the species' sensory system. The square wave-like motion is especially helpful for making sure the receiver can detect the display among the background foliage of the forest. Since males are constantly patrolling their territories, they have to frequently adjust the amplitude of their head bob as well depending on their distance to the other lizard, such as larger amplitude if a lizard is further away. However, male A. gundlachi use a smaller amplitude when at a shorter distance from another lizard. In addition, pattern and duration of the display is also adjusted depending on distance. Failure to modulate according to these factors can affect the ability of the displayer to attract mates and not being able to tell rivals they occupy a given territory, which can then escalate to agonistic encounters between the two males.

== Social behavior ==
=== Escape behaviors ===
The escape behavior of A. gundlachi is affected by temperature, sex, and perch type. It flees at greater distance from the threat at lower temperatures. In addition, females use vertical perches, which are safer, and have greater approach distances than males. Vertical perches are safer because they are taller and allow the lizard to escape above the reach of predators on the ground, as well as let the lizard climb more quickly. Adult males tend to escape by running long distances, greater than 40 cm (16 in), down a perch toward the ground or up a branch or tree trunk, while juveniles tend to escape by running shorter distances, less than 25 cm (9.8 in), usually down toward the ground to take advantage of their brown body color to hide amongst the leaf litter.

=== Behavioral differences between adults and juveniles ===
Adult males are more often found on large tree trunks, fallen logs, and large branches, which provide more safety than vertical perches. Juvenile A. gundlachi are found more frequently on narrow surfaces. Adult males perch on higher and broader perches than juveniles, as well as tend to walk more and jump less as a method of locomotion. Adult males tend to spend more time performing display behaviors to other A. gundlachi than juveniles. Adult males also scan the territory below their perch in a face-down survey posture more frequently than juveniles.

== Thermoregulation ==
The habitat of A. gundlachi is limited to the shaded rainforests of Puerto Rico. Rogowitz (1996) observed that A. gundlachi does not usually participate in thermoregulatory behaviors such as basking to compensate for variation in elevation in its habitat. After examining lizards from the low-altitude range, 350–400 m (1,150–1,310 ft), and high-altitude range, 850–900 m (2,790–2,950 ft), of its habitat, no change in metabolism rates was found that would help the lizard adjust to the difference in temperature due to altitude. There was also no change in metabolic rate when exposed to lower than usual temperatures, but there was a decrease in metabolism and loss of mass when exposed to higher temperatures than usual. This lack of capacity to compensate for temperature differences from altitude means A. gundlachi is limited to its mountainous, shaded environment to survive and thrive.

== Conservation ==
The IUCN red list classifies A. gundlachi as a species of least concern. Threats include climate change and severe weather events, which has been altering the habitat of A. gundlachi over the past 35 years. Reduction in arthropod species in Puerto Rican forests threatens their predators.
