= Anolis carolinensis anole series =

Clade of lizards

The Anolis carolinensis series is a proposed clade or subgroup of closely related mid-sized trunk crown anoles (US: /əˈnoʊ.liz/) within the genus Anolis. It was created by Nicholson et al. in 2012 and defined as containing 13 species, a few examples are listed below.

species name	image	description	distribution
Carolina ("green") anole (Anolis carolinensis)		Male: head and body bright green; white throat and underside; red dewlap. Female: overall bright green with white throat and underside; dorsal white bar or diamond pattern running down the length of the back; dewlap is reduced or absent	North Carolina, South Carolina, Georgia, Florida, and the Gulf Coast in Alabama, Mississippi, Louisiana, and Texas. The species has been introduced into Hawaii and the Ogasawara Islands.
Cuban green anole (Anolis porcatus)		Male: head and body green with white speckels on body, throat and underside white with red dewlap. Female: overall bright green with white throat and underside and dorsal white bar or diamond pattern running down the length of the back, dewlap is reduced or absent	Cuba and Isla de la Juventud. Introduced to the Dominican Republic, parts of Florida, and Tenerife.
Allison's anole (Anolis allisoni)		Male: head, forelimbs and upper body bright blue, lower body bright green white throat and underside with red dewlap. Female: bright green overall with white throat and underside; dewlap is reduced or absent.	Cuba. Introduced to Honduras and Half Moon Caye in Belize.
Bahamian green anole (Anolis smaragdinus)		Male: head green with bright electric blue speckles, body green with white throat and light green underside. Dewlap is bright red. Female: head and body bright green with pale green underside and white throat. Dewlap is reduced or absent.	Bahamas (Cat Island, Exuma, Little San Salvador).

== List of A. carolinensis clade species ==
- Anolis allisoni – Allison's anole
- Anolis altitudinalis
- Anolis brunneus
- Anolis carolinensis – Carolina anole, American green anole
- Anolis fairchildi
- Anolis incredulus
- Anolis isolepis
- Anolis longiceps
- Anolis maynardii
- Anolis oporinus
- Anolis porcatus – Cuban green anole
- Anolis smaragdinus – Bahamian green anole
- Anolis toldo

== Origin ==
Many species of the carolinensis subgroup are remarkably obscure and, with the exception of a few species such as A.carolinensis, very little is known about its members or its origin. However, it is believed that the clade originated on Cuba (Glor 2005), with repeated overwater dispersion leading to multiple speciation events. It is believed that at least four separate speciation events would have been necessary to explain the diversity found within the Carolinensis subgroup; however, the origin of several species such as A.longiceps, A.brunneus and A.maynardii has not been fully understood. It is believed that the last common ancestor of the Carolinensis subgroup evolved approximately six million years ago; molecular dating currently supports this theory.

The sister subgroup to the carolinensus subgroup is the isolepis group, with three species (Glor 2005).

== Morphology ==
In many respects the anoles of the Anolis carolinensis clade are typical trunk-crown anoles. They have a slender build, have large subdigital toe-pads to cling to vertical surfaces, are commonly found several metres above the ground and with the exception of A. brunneus and A. allisoni, are usually predominantly green in coloration to blend in with the vegetation in the canopy. The most notable morphological difference between the anoles of the Carolinensis clade and the rest of the genus Anolis is that Carolinensis group anoles typically have large, conspicuously elongated heads and extreme levels of sexual dimorphism.

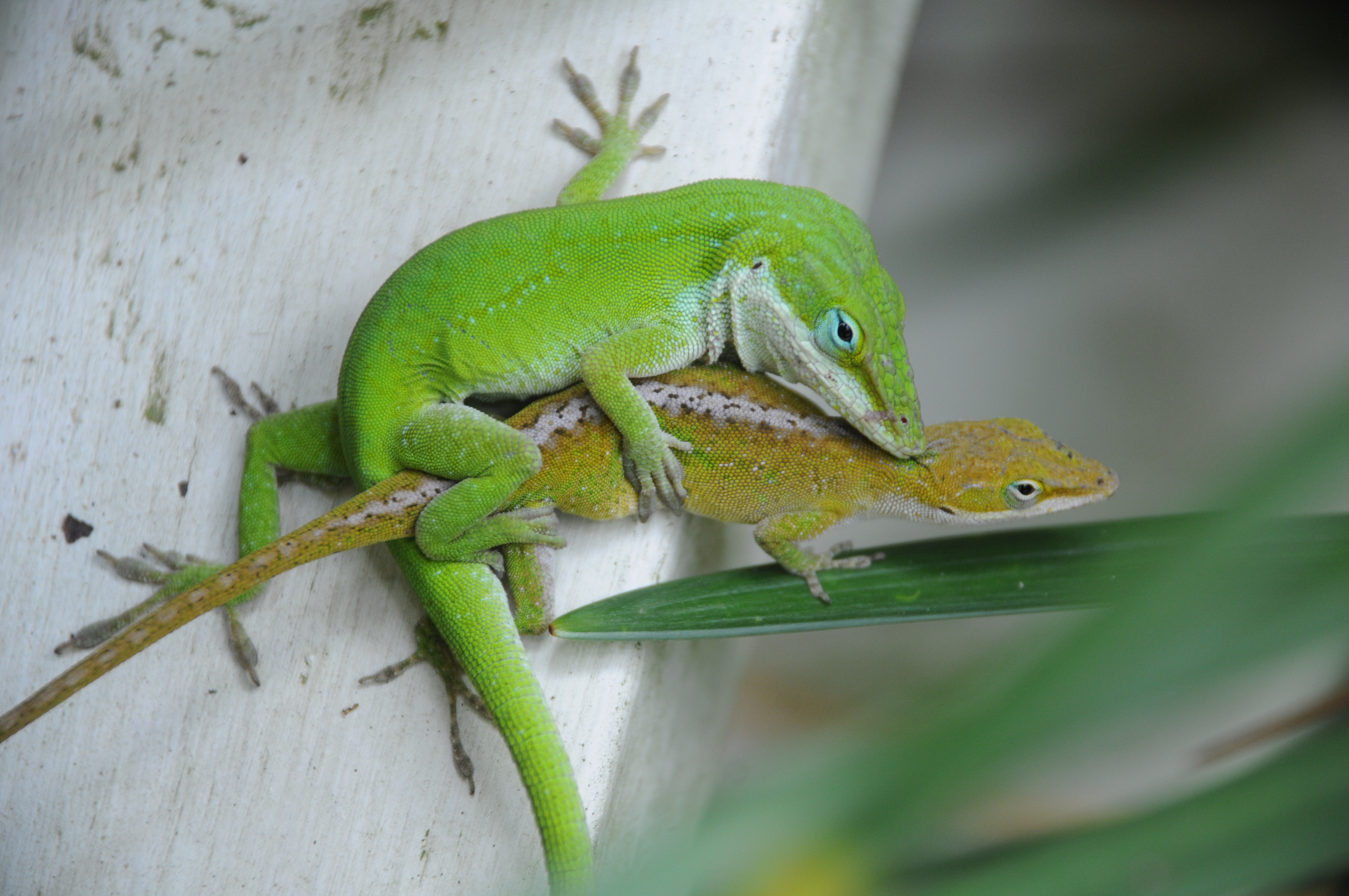
Photo of mating green anoles (Anolis carolinensis) male is on top and female is on bottom. Note higher level of facial elongation and larger size in male.

Both these features are most pronounced in species found on small islands rather than on large landmasses such as Cuba and North America. One such species, Anolis maynardi, reaches the highest recorded level of facial elongation among anoles, and one of the highest levels of sexual dimorphism among iguanid lizards. The reason for the extreme levels of facial elongation in the Carolinensis anole species is not yet understood; however, it is worth noting that it is only males that reach these extreme levels of facial elongation.

== Distribution ==
Anoles of this clade are primarily found on Cuba, where it is believed that the clade originated; however, the anoles of this subgroup are also native to several neighboring islands or territories such as Honduras (A. allisoni) and Hispaniola (A. porcatus). Several species are found exclusively on small islands neighbouring Cuba such as Navassa (A.longiceps) and the Cayman Islands (A.maynardi).

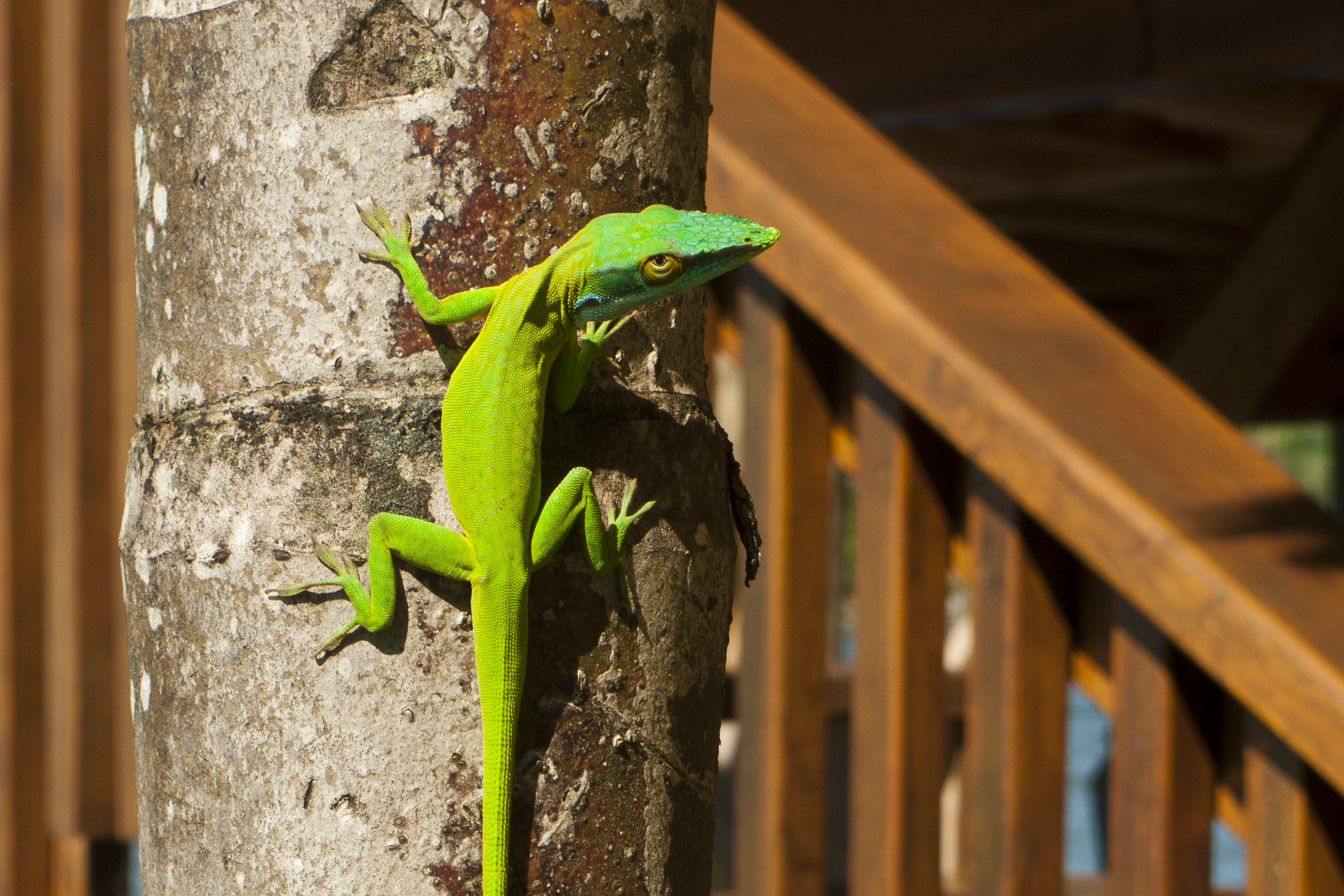
Allison's anole (A.allisoni) on Honduras

Anolis carolinensis is native to the United States but has been introduced to areas of Japan.

The Carolinensis group anole Anolis porcatus has also been introduced to parts of Florida. A. carolinensis has been found to regularly hybridize with A. porcatus individuals in Southern Florida. A 2022 study found there to be asymmetric introgression of certain A. porcatus alleles within the population of hybrid individuals, three of which were found to be significantly associated with environmental variables indicative of urbanization.

== Bibliography ==
- Glor, Richard E.; Losos, Jonathan B.; Larson, Allan (2005). "Out of Cuba: Overwater dispersal and speciation among lizards in the Anolis carolinensis subgroup" (PDF). Molecular Ecology. 14 (8): 2419–2432. Bibcode:2005MolEc..14.2419G. doi:10.1111/j.1365-294X.2005.02550.x. PMID 15969724. S2CID 20092906.
