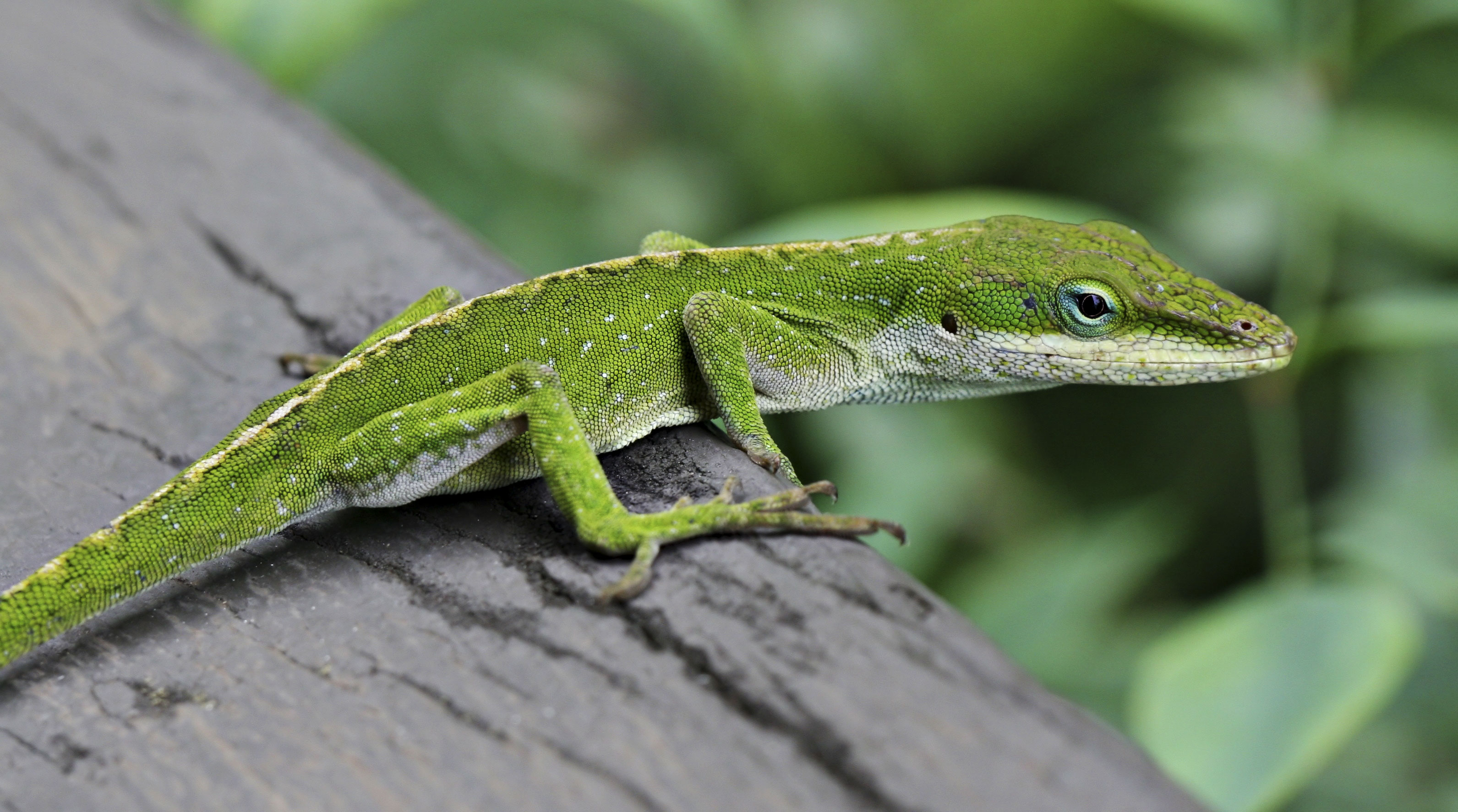
- Typical green color (above) and brown form (below)
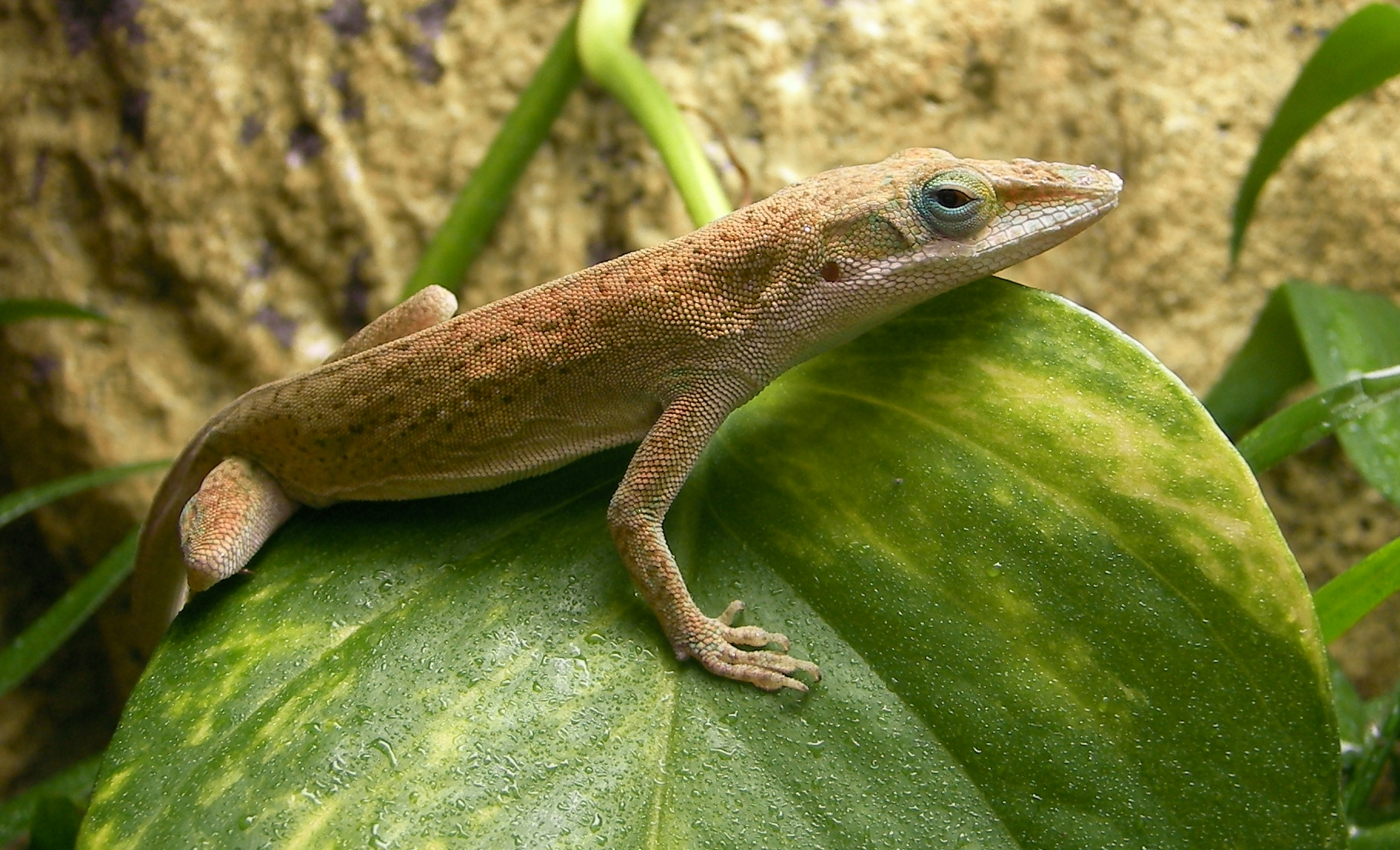

Conservation status
- Least Concern (IUCN 3.1)

- Secure (NatureServe)

Scientific classification
- Kingdom: Animalia
- Phylum: Chordata
- Class: Reptilia
- Order: Squamata
- Suborder: Iguania
- Family: Anolidae
- Genus: Anolis
- Species: A. carolinensis

Binomial name
- Anolis carolinensis Voigt, 1832

= Anolis carolinensis =

Anolis Carolinensis

Species of reptile

Anolis carolinensis or green anole (US: /əˈnoʊ.li/) (among other names below) is a tree-dwelling species of anole lizard native to the southeastern United States and introduced to islands in the Pacific and Caribbean. A small to medium-sized lizard, the green anole is a trunk-crown ecomorph and can change its color to several shades from brown to green.

Other names include the Carolina anole, Carolina green anole, American anole, American green anole, North American green anole and red-throated anole. It is commonly called chameleon in the southeastern United States and sometimes referred to as the American chameleon (typically in the pet trade) due to its color-changing ability; however, it is not a true chameleon.

== Taxonomy ==
Anolis carolinensis is a species of the large lizard genus Anolis within the family Dactyloidae (anole lizards). This species was named by Friedrich Siegmund Voigt (1781-1850) in 1832.

Phylogenetic evidence indicates that the Carolina anole belongs to the Anolis carolinensis anole series, a wider clade of Caribbean Anolis which are all also known as "green anoles". This group is composed of mid-sized trunk-crown anoles with large, conspicuously elongated heads and extreme levels of sexual dimorphism. Other members of this thirteen-species clade include A. brunneus & A. smaragdinus from the Bahamas, A. longiceps from Navassa Island, A. maynardii from the Cayman Islands, and A. allisoni & A. porcatus from Cuba; A. carolinensis is the only member of this clade native to the American mainland. Genetic analysis indicates that A. carolinensis originates from an oceanic dispersal event of an ancestral green anole from Cuba to the southern United States during the late Miocene or Pliocene. This is a rare example of an insular species successfully colonizing the mainland of a continent rather than the more common vice versa, although several other Caribbean animal and plant groups have similarly successfully colonized mainland North America via Florida. The present diversity of Central and South American anoles is also thought to originate from a colonization of the American mainland by an insular Caribbean anole taxon.

== Description ==
The anole is a small to medium-sized lizard, with a slender body. Males of this species are slightly larger than females. The head is long and pointed with ridges between the eyes and nostrils, and smaller ones on the top of the head. The toes have adhesive pads to facilitate climbing. Green anoles use jumping for their primary means of locomotion. They exhibit sexual dimorphism, the males being fifteen percent larger. Adult males within a population can be classified within a heavyweight and a lightweight morph. The male dewlap (throat fan) is three times the size of the female's and bright orange to red, whereas that of the female is lighter in color. The dewlap is usually pink for Anolis carolinensis (more orange-red in A. sagrei) and is very rarely present in females. The color of the dewlap is variable and different from the lizard eye to the human eye. Green anoles are thought to be capable of seeing a larger range of the UV spectrum, and that the dewlap reflects ultraviolet light to attract mates. Female anoles do, however, often have a dorsal line down their back. Extension of the dewlap from the throat is used for communication. Males can form a pronounced dorsal ridge behind the head when displaying or when under stress. Females and juveniles have a prominent white stripe running along their spine, a feature most males lack.

Adult males are usually 12.5–20.3 cm (4.9–8.0 in) long, with about 60-70% of which is made up of its tail. They have a body length, also known as a snout to vent length (SVL), up to 7.5 cm (3.0 in) and can weigh from 3–7 g (0.11–0.25 oz).

=== Coloration and color morphs ===
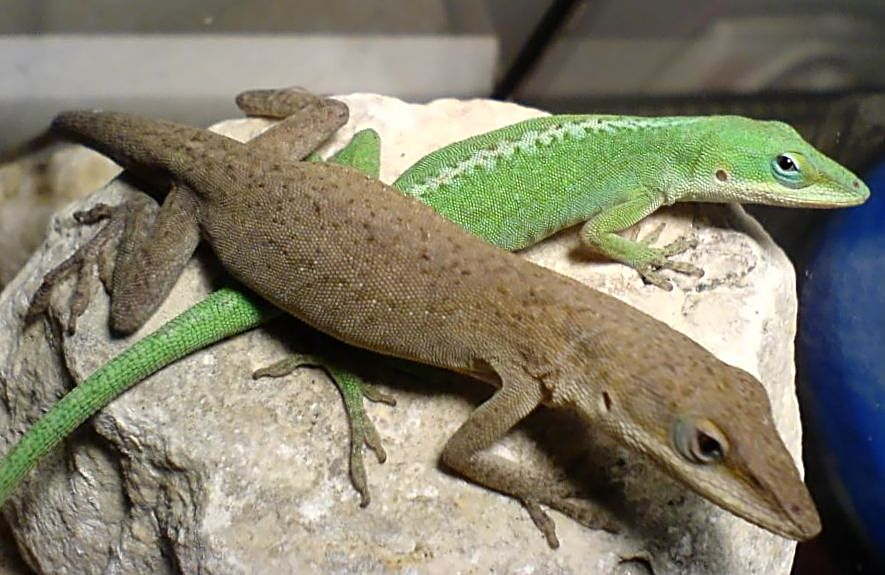
Contrasting colors. The prominent white dorsal stripe is characteristic of females.

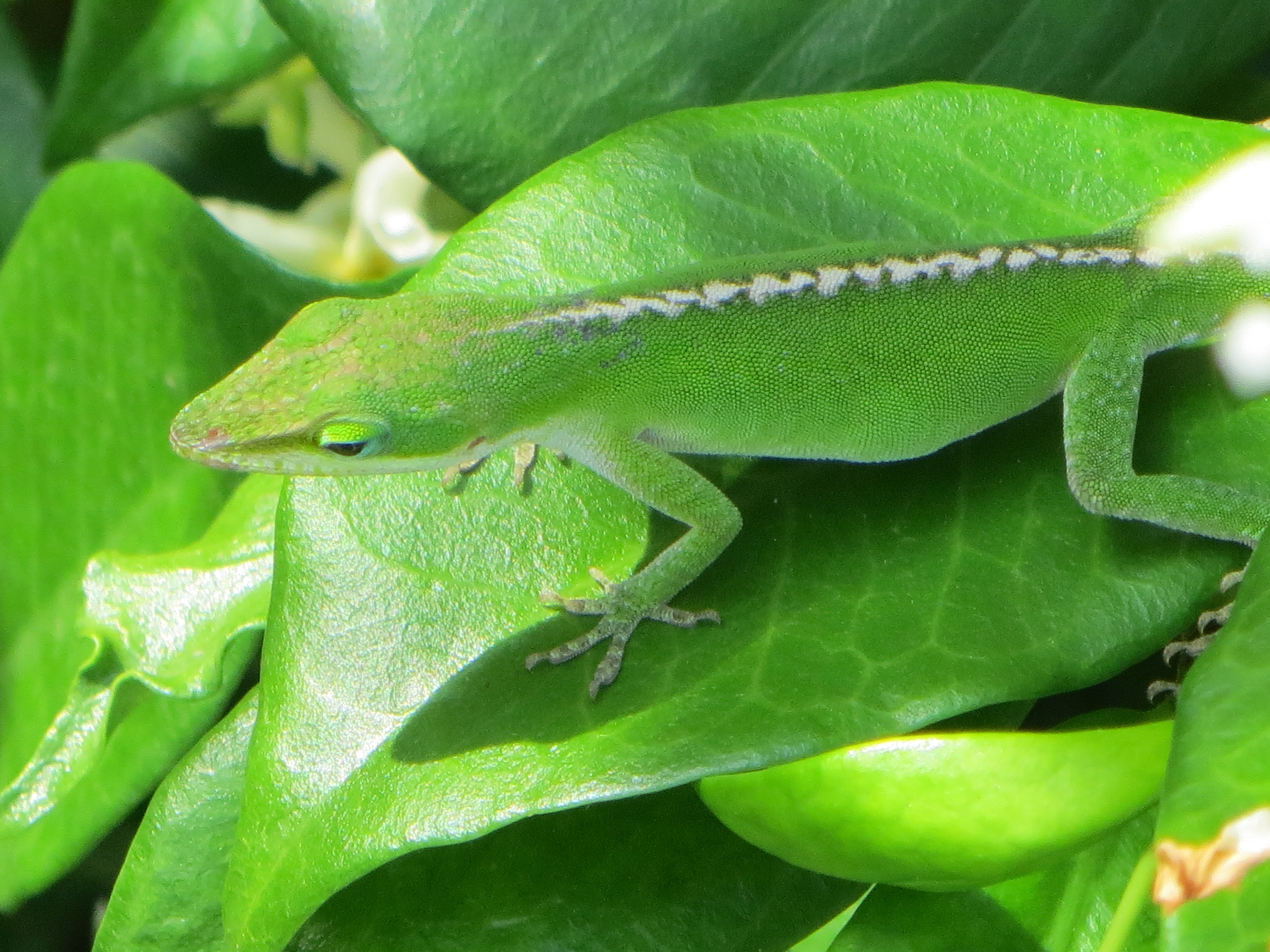
Anolis carolinensis on Star Jasmine, South Carolina, demonstrating camouflage

Colour varies from brown to green and can be changed like many other kinds of lizards, but anoles are closely related to iguanas and are not true chameleons. Although A. carolinensis is sometimes called an 'American chameleon', true chameleons do not naturally occur in the Americas, and A. carolinensis is not the only lizard currently in its area of distribution capable of changing colour. In contrast, many species of true chameleons display a greater range of color adaptation, though some can hardly change color at all.

Typical coloration for a green anole ranges from bright green to dark brown, with little variation in between. The color spectrum is a result of three layers of pigment cells or chromatophores: the xanthophores, responsible for the yellow pigmentation; cyanophores, responsible for the blue pigmentation, and melanophores, responsible for the brown and black pigmentation. The anole changes its color depending on mood, level of stress, activity level and as a social signal (for example, displaying dominance). Anolis carolinensis takes darker coloration as its base color at the beginning of the breeding season when it is generally cooler, and the adult males change their body coloration to more greenish when they need to advertise their territorial possession. Although often claimed, evidence does not support that they do it in response to the color of the background (camouflage). Whether they do it in response to temperature (thermoregulation) is less clear, with studies both supporting it and contradicting it. Changing color while under a sharply contrasting shadow can cause a "stencil effect", where the outline of the shadow is temporarily imprinted in the animal's coloration (see image in gallery, below). When stressed—while fighting, for example—the skin just behind the lizard's eyes may turn black independently from the rest of the animal's coloration, forming "postocular spots".

A lack in one of the pigment genes causes color exceptions. These color mutations are also called phases. The rare blue-phased green anole lacks xanthophores, which results in a blue, rather than red, often pastel blue, anole. These specimens have become popular recently in the pet trade market. When the anole is completely lacking xanthophores, it is said to be axanthic and the animal will have a completely pastel- or baby-blue hue. They are extremely rare—usually produced in one of every 20,000 individual anoles in the wild. Another phase is the yellow-phased green anole, which lacks cyanophores. Colonies of these rare color-phased anoles have been reported, but anoles with these color mutations rarely live for long, since the green color provides camouflage for hunting down prey, as well as hiding from predators.

== Distribution and habitat ==
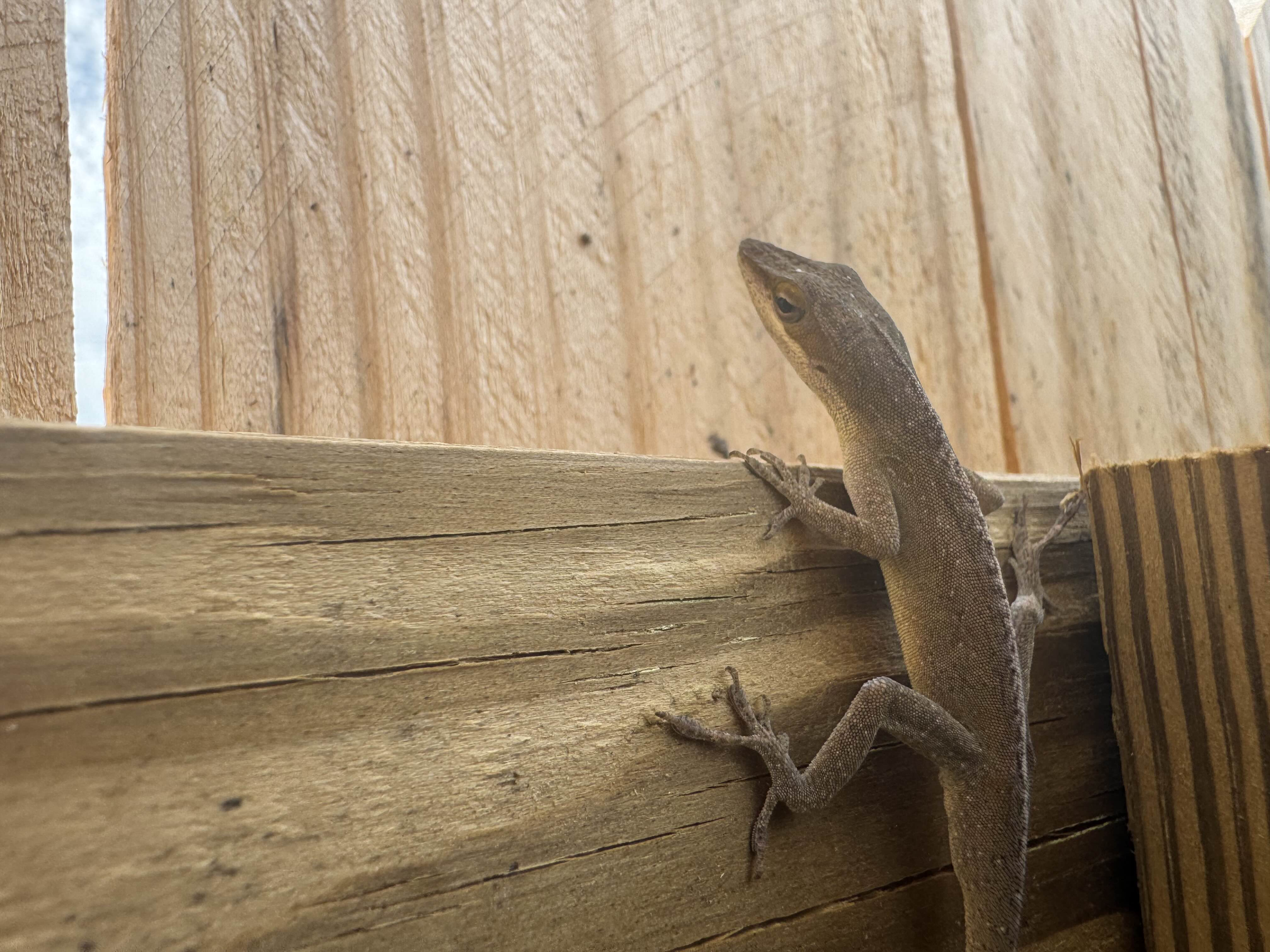
Brown Anolis carolinensis on a fence in north Georgia

This species is native to North America, where it is found mainly in the subtropical southeastern parts of the continent. They also inhabit grasslands, forests, and temperate zones. Anoles are the most abundant on the Atlantic Coastal Plains in North Carolina, South Carolina, Georgia and Florida, and on the Gulf Coast in Alabama, Mississippi, Louisiana, and Texas, where they extend inland as far as Texas Hill Country and the DFW Metroplex; they have also been recorded in Tamaulipas, Mexico, but it is mostly likely an introduction. In the Carolinas, they are found on the coastal plains as far north as False Cape in Virginia, and in the southern piedmont of North Carolina, but throughout South Carolina, while in Georgia they are widespread except in the Blue Ridge region.

The species has been introduced into various locales in the Pacific and the Caribbean: Hawaii, the Ogasawara Islands, the Northern Mariana Islands, the Bahamas, Anguilla, Palau, and Saint Vincent and the Grenadines, as well as the Canary Islands. In 2005 they were recognized and listed as an invasive alien species in the Ogasawara Islands of Japan for causing insect population collapse. Green anoles have also been considered successful invaders as they have made their way into parts of Europe. They have been sighted in Orange County and San Diego County of southern California, with sightings in San Diego going at least as far back as 1993.

A. carolinensis is arboreal in nature but may be seen on the ground and frequently seen on shrubs in the low country of the Carolinas. However, it can live in cities like Atlanta with little trouble so long as there is plentiful vegetation and bugs to eat. Compared to other species of lizards, green anoles are known to be the ones with the most adaptation to human encroachment. One can observe them on steps, trellises, and railings adjacent to foliage; on particularly hot summer days they may seek to cool off on indoor walls or on wrap around porches of older buildings, and in the former case can simply be captured in a shoebox and gently placed outdoors. It is common on roadsides, the edges of forests where there are shrubs and vines, but also construction sites having abundant foliage and sunlight. Their preferred habitat is open pine communities with a greater shrub density, it may harbor a greater abundance of anoles where they are able to watch for prey and intruders coming into their territory.

== Conservation ==
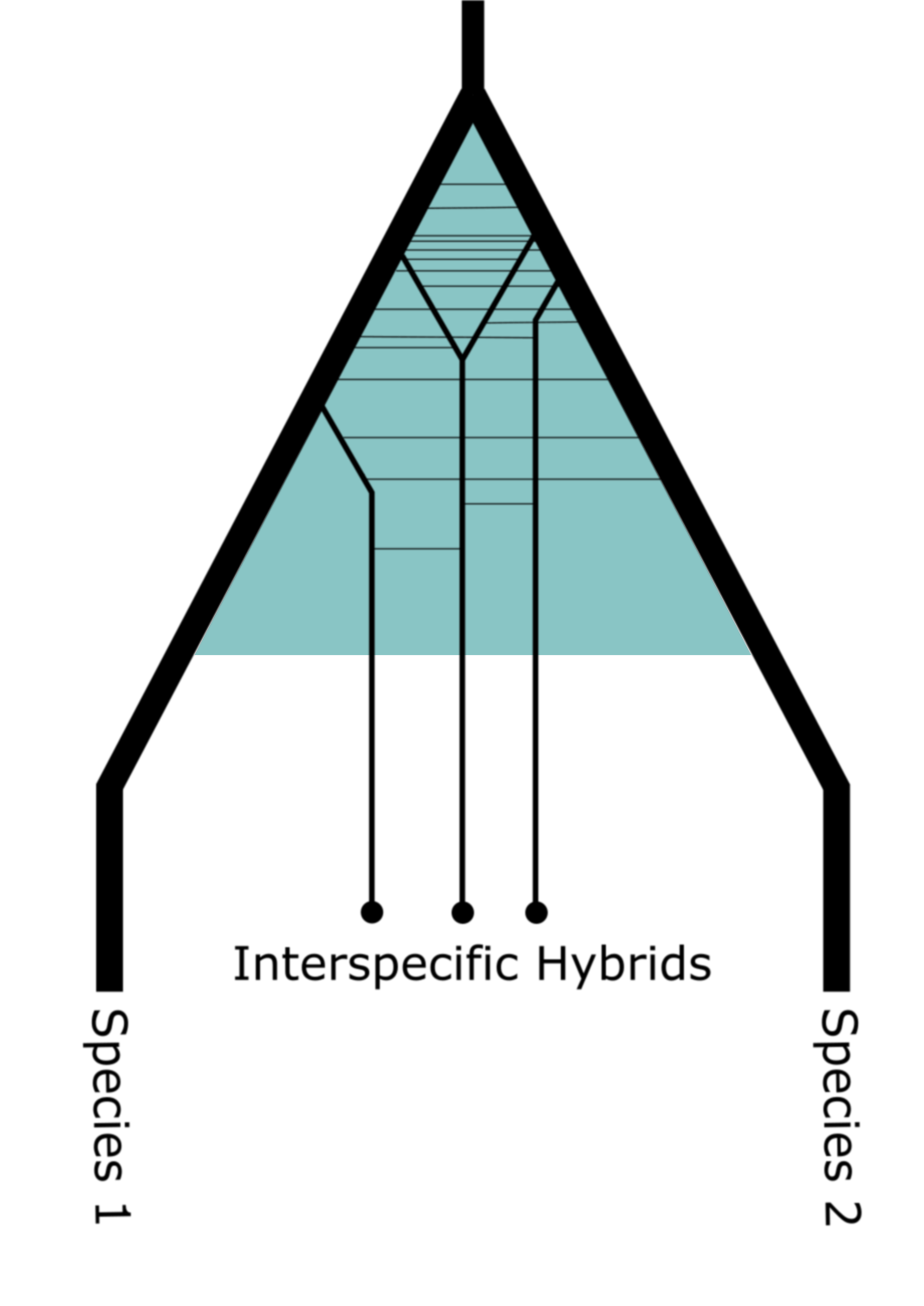
A phylogenetic model of introgressive hybridization, e.g. among A. carolinensis and A. porcatus. The hybrid zone of the two species' lineages is shown in blue, with each horizontal line representing an individual introgressive event.

Although not threatened as a species, Carolina anoles increasingly struggle with competition from introduced anole species, such as the brown anole (Anolis sagrei), also known as the Bahamian anole. This competition happened to be an interesting model for evolutionary studies, as it illustrates the process of adaptation. When A. sagrei first appeared in the United States in the early 1900s, the Carolina anole mostly ceded ground-level territories and were relegated to a very different ecosystem high in the treetops. On occasion, more aggressive Carolina anole individuals may still be seen closer to the ground. Currently, A. carolinensis is abundant in its area of distribution and is able to thrive in disturbed areas, so it is not considered threatened, but A. sagrei may represent a developing threat in some areas.

== Relationships and hybridization ==
Location of hybridization between A. carolinensis and A. porcatus

A. carolinensis has been found to regularly hybridize with a closely related species, Anolis porcatus (the Cuban green anole), in Southern Florida, where A. porcatus has been introduced. A 2022 study found there to be asymmetric introgression of certain A. porcatus alleles within the population of hybrid individuals, three of which were found to be significantly associated with environmental variables indicative of urbanization. It remains uncertain as to how this admixture of invasive alleles to the Carolina anole will affect the conservation of the species going forward. Not all admixture from invasive populations should be viewed as a negative outcome, and adaptive introgression as a result of hybridization with an ecologically robust invasive population might facilitate the long-term survival of native populations otherwise unable to adapt to human impact on the environment.

== Behavior ==
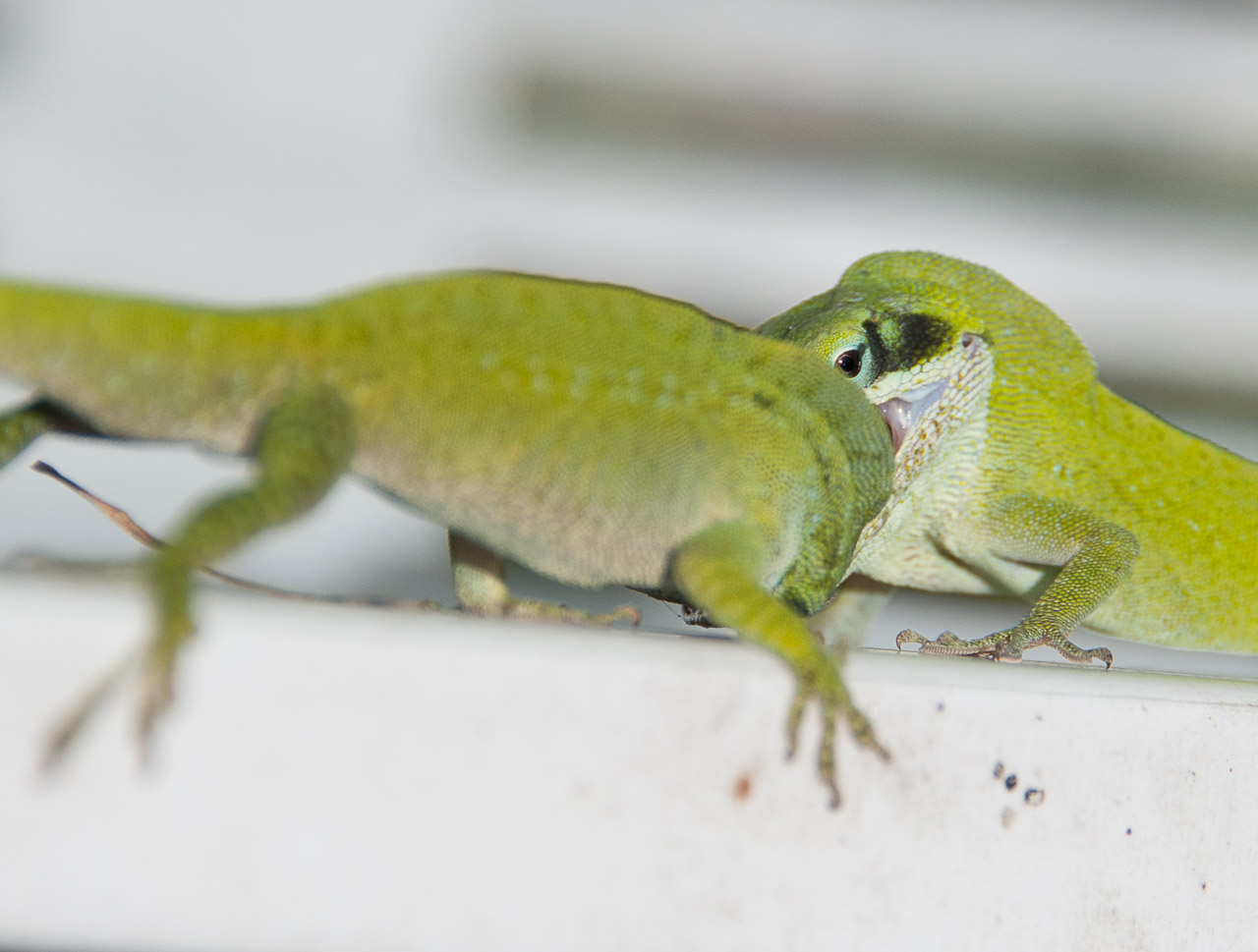
Male Carolina anoles fighting, exhibiting pronounced dorsal ridge signaling aggression, and black postocular spots behind the eyes, indicating stress

Male anoles are strongly territorial creatures. Some have even been witnessed fighting their own reflections in mirrored glass. The male will fight other males to defend his territory. These larger territories encompass multiple smaller areas of females so males can maintain exclusive reproductive access.On sighting another male, the anole will compress his body, extend the dewlap, inflate a dorsal ridge, bob his head and attempt to chase the rival away. If the rival male continues to approach, anoles will fight by biting and scratching each other. Studies have also shown that there is a positive correlation between bite-force and the size of the individual's dewlap.

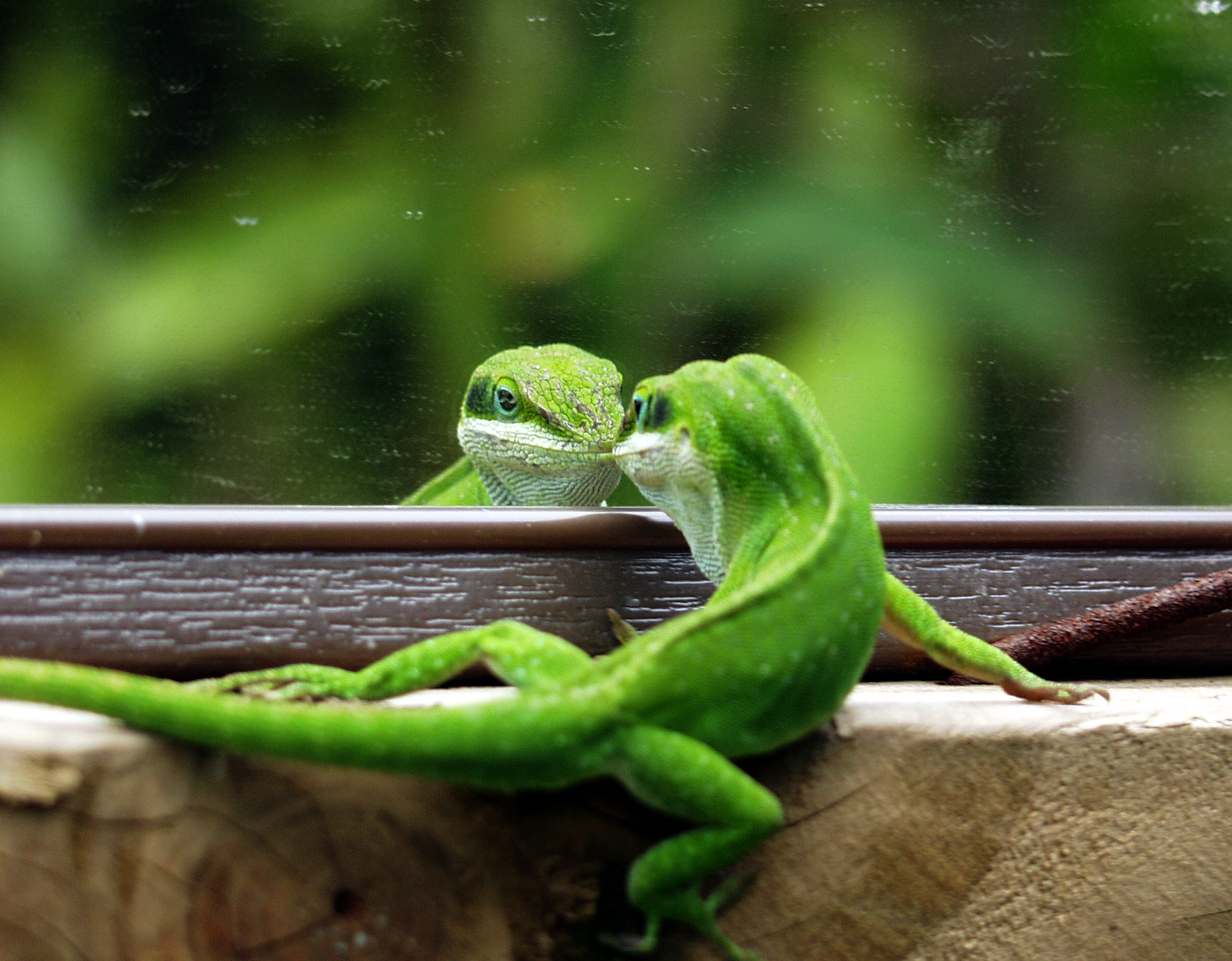
Anole displaying at its reflection

Adult male anoles have two different morphs: heavyweight and lightweight. Heavyweight males are shown to have larger bodies and heads as well as a high bite force, while lightweight males have smaller heads and a lower bite force. One study showed that heavyweights had 50% higher testosterone concentrations than lightweights during the breeding season. It seems that disproportionately larger heads and dewlaps may be correlated to higher bite forces of heavyweights. Those with darker colorations will choose lower perch sites compared to their lighter conspecifics. For heavyweight males of the same size the one with the higher bite force wins disputes more frequently.

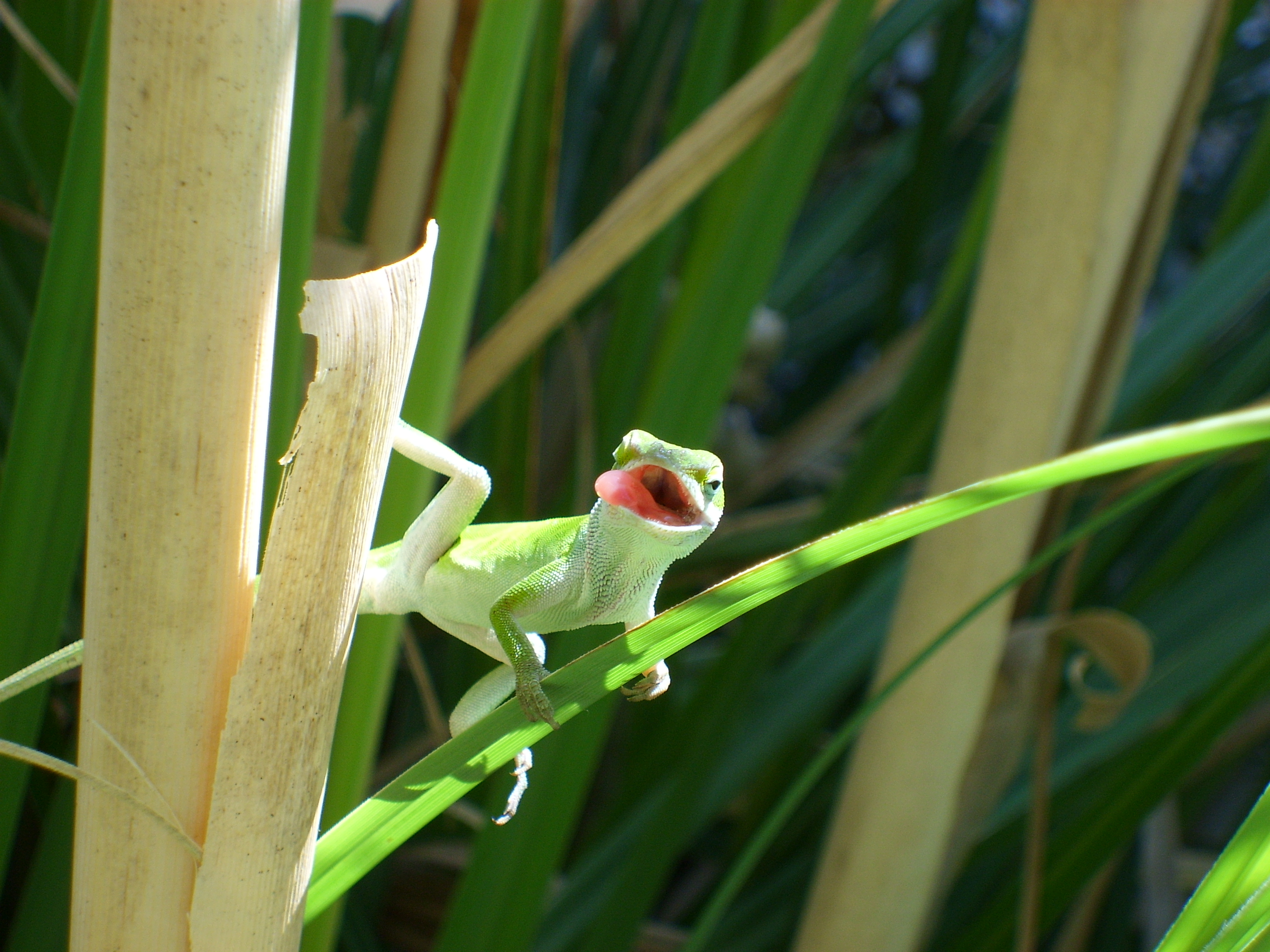
Carolina anole licking

Adult female anoles have much smaller dewlaps that they rarely use during encounters with other anoles and never use during courting. Serious injury is rare, but males often carry numerous scars on their heads and faces, especially during the mating season. Their territories, which are about 1 m^{3} (35 cu ft), usually include two to three females.

The Carolina anole is diurnal and active throughout the year, peaking in spring and fall. Winter activity is dependent on sun and temperature.

== Diet ==
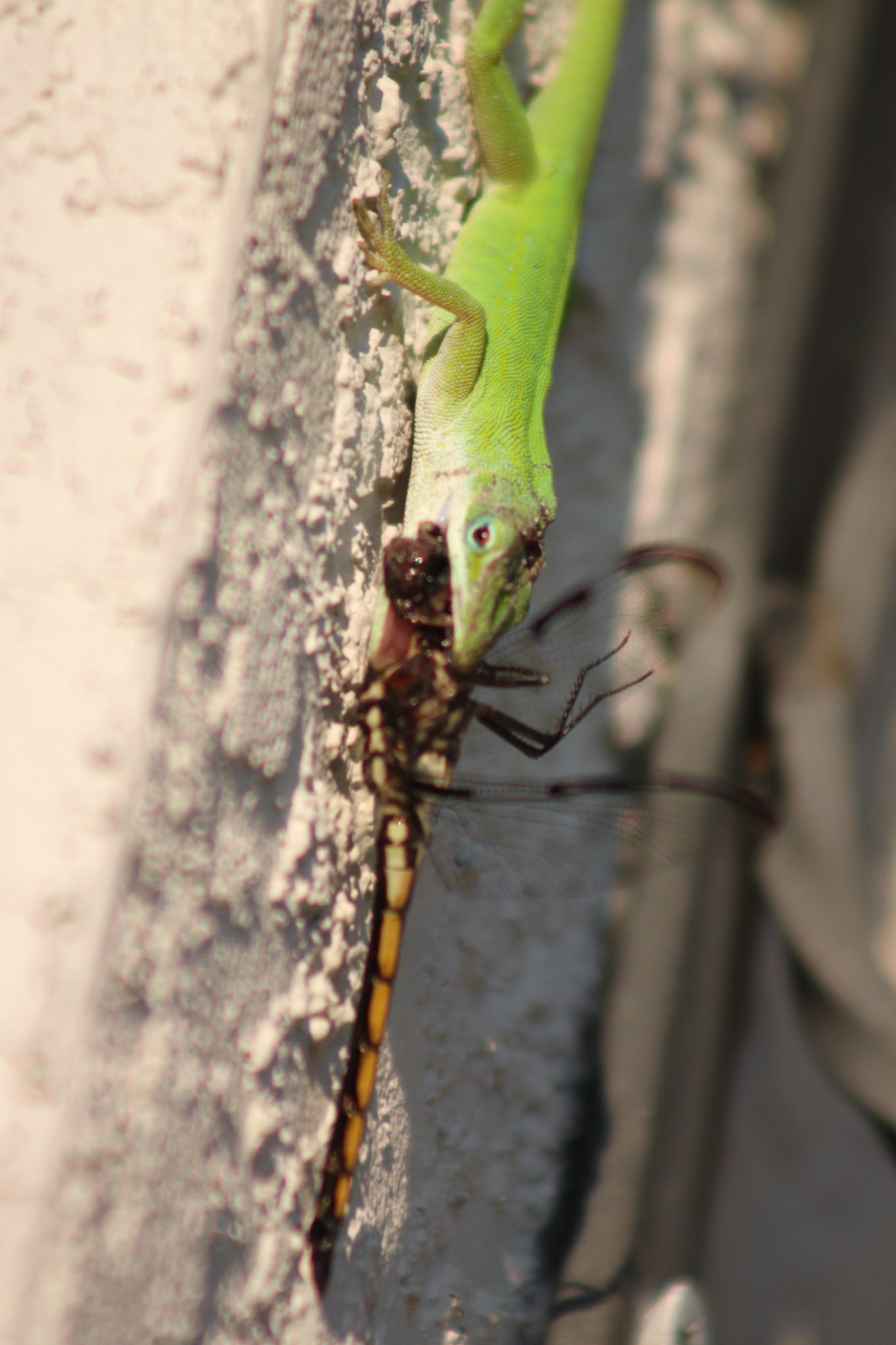
Male Carolina anole eating a dragonfly. Note the inflated dorsal ridge

An anole's diet consists primarily of small insects such as crickets, grasshoppers, flies, butterflies, moths, cockroaches, small beetles, and other arthropods, including spiders, as well as occasionally feeding on various molluscs, grains, and seeds. Although anoles have been observed preying upon smaller reptiles such as juvenile skinks, this is not thought to be typical behavior. Many people who keep these lizards as pets feed them mealworms, grubs, maggots, and small crickets.

== Predators ==
Major predators include the broadhead skink, snakes, birds, and in urban habitats, cats. Like many lizards, anoles display autotomic tails, which wiggle when broken off. This distracts the predator and helps the anole to escape. A new tail then starts to develop. The new tail, however, containing cartilage rather than bone, will typically not grow back to the same length as the first one, and may exhibit a marked difference in color and texture from the rest of the animal. Green anoles will also try to escape predators by climbing vertical walls, trees, fences, or any vertical surface they can find. This ability is possible due to their enlarged toe pads and great climbing ability.

Anoles are parasitized by some species of sarcophagid flies, including Lepidodexia blakeae. Adult flies will deposit eggs on live anoles, and the fly larvae develop inside the lizard until they emerge from a wound and pupate into adult flies in sediment. Infection is often fatal, with mortality rates possibly as high as 90%.

== Reproduction ==
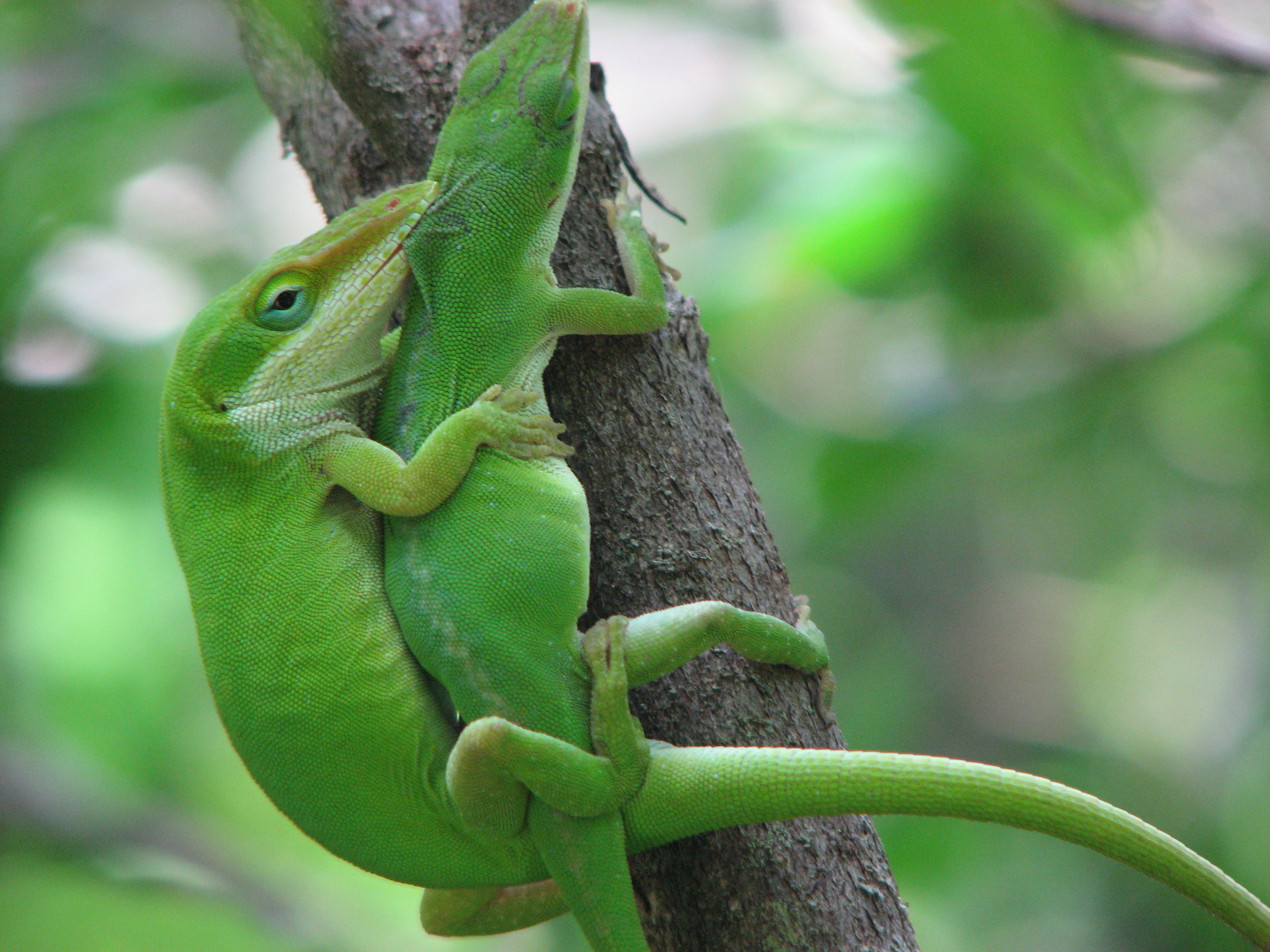
Carolina anoles mating

The typical breeding season for Carolina anoles starts as early as April and ends in late September, gonadal activity being largely regulated by photoperiod, enlarging in spring as the weather warms up and days lengthen, and then regressing in late summer. Reproduction is highest in the summer, as the intense heat in mid-summer maximizes their gonadal activity. At the beginning of the non-breeding season, green anoles experience a refractory season, which would occur from late fall until late winter/early spring.

During this time, the males patrol their territory and the most brilliant displays of these creatures can be seen. Males are known to be very territorial and can inflict serious wounds by biting other males. Males defend their territory and females from rivals, while courting the females with elaborate displays of extending their brightly colored dewlaps while bobbing up and down, almost doing a dance. The dewlap is also used to ward off other males. The male courts and pursues a female until the two successfully mate. Usually, when the female is ready to mate, she may let the male catch her, at which point he will grasp her by biting a fold of her skin behind her neck. The male will then position his tail underneath the female's tail near her vent. Males have two sex organs, known as hemipenes, which are normally kept within the body, but are everted from his vent for mating. Males seem to alternate between the left and right hemipenis on successive matings.

The female matures one ovarian follicle at a time, the ovaries alternating in production. The sight of a courting male induces ovarian development, sexual receptiveness and then ovulation. About two to four weeks following mating, the female lays her first clutch of eggs, usually one or two in the first clutch. She can produce an egg every two weeks during the breeding season, until about 10 eggs have been produced. However, she can store sperm for up to eight months following mating. She then buries the soft-shelled eggs in a shallow depression in soft soil, leaf litter, compost, rotting wood, or even a hole in a nearby tree. Eggs average 12.5 mm (0.49 in) by 9.3 mm (0.37 in) in size.

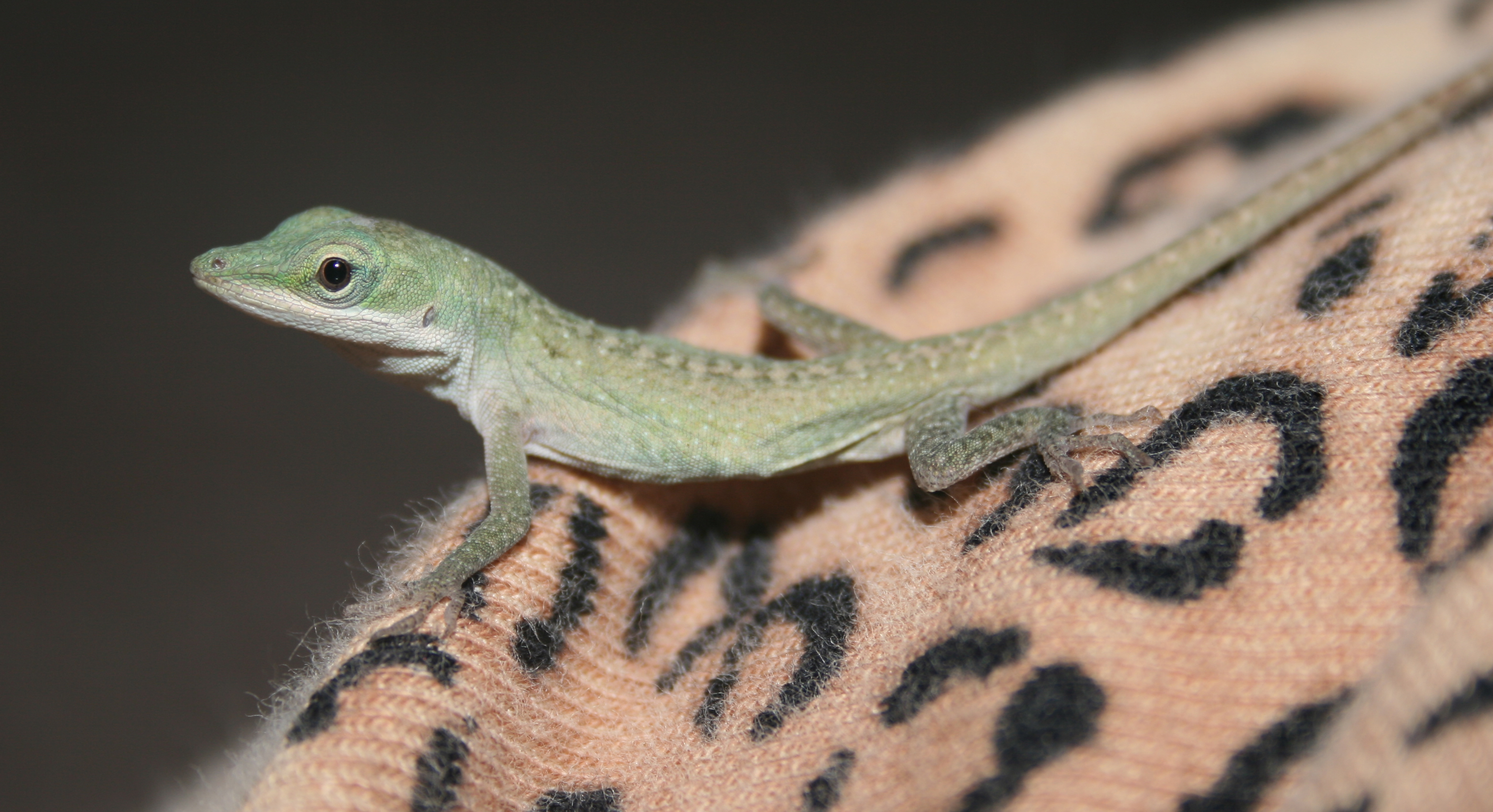
Juvenile male

The eggs are left to incubate by the heat of the sun, and if successful, will hatch in about five to seven weeks (30–45 days) from late May to early October. The incubation temperature has to be 80 to 85 °F (27 to 29 °C). On hatching, the hatchlings are 52–67 mm (2.0–2.6 in) in length.

The hatchlings must fend for themselves, as they are not cared for by either parent. The young hatchlings must be wary of other adult anoles in the area, as well as larger reptiles and mammals, which could eat them. Younger anoles differ from adults in having less obvious head ridges, a wider head and shorter tail. They mature in about eight months.

== Captivity ==
Carolina anoles' nervous natures makes it advisable not to attempt to handle them very often; despite this, Carolina anoles are popular pets. If nervous, they can bite their handlers, and can potentially lose their tail in the process of escaping. Individual animals may or may not adapt readily to cage life. Care must be taken to ensure the animals receive the support they need to adapt to captivity. An adequately sized enclosure, as well as the appropriate plants and substrate material, are beneficial to the health of captive Carolina anoles.

A green anole in captivity, if cared properly, can live up to 8 years. These lizards can be easily kept in a small, reptile-specific enclosure sold in every pet store as they rarely grow more than 8 inches.

However, there should be one male green anole in a tank as they are territorial and may end up fighting for the territory. Keeping multiple female green anoles in a tank won't create any problem unless there isn't enough room for them.

Green anoles are considered to be a good pet for beginners as they are easy to care for. Their habitat should include the following:

- Humidity level should be kept at 60-70%.
- Day temperature should be maintained at 77–86 °F (25–30 °C).
- Night temperature should be maintained at 70–75 °F (21–24 °C).
- A basking light should be installed in the tank and a temperature of 90–95 °F (32–35 °C) must be maintained.
- Natural light is best for reptiles, but a UVB light can be installed in the terrarium. A 5.0 UVB light would be a good option.
- Green anoles are terrestrial lizards and spend most of their time on the ground or climbing plants. They do not dig or burrow. A substrate should not be harmful for their skin. Substrate can be made using coconut coir, moss, reptile soil, etc., which is natural and also helps maintain moisture and temperature.
- Hatchlings should be given 2-3 food items (insects) once a day, whereas an adult should be fed 2-3 food insects every other day. Gut loading or dusting of insects can provide better nutrients to the lizards in captivity.

== Genomics ==
This species has been chosen as a model reptile for genomics by the National Human Genome Research Institute genome sequencing program. It was selected because of the ease and low cost of laboratory breeding and evolutionary value of the diversity of the genus. In 2011, the complete genome of this lizard was sequenced and published in Nature. Before its genome was published, only mammals and three bird species had been sequenced among amniotes. The draft genome sequence is 1.78 Gb (compared with 2.0–3.6 Gb mammalian and 0.9–1.3 Gb avian genome assemblies), of which 27% are mobile elements such as LINEs. A total of 17,472 protein-coding genes and 2,924 RNA genes were predicted from the A. carolinensis genome assembly.

== Gallery ==
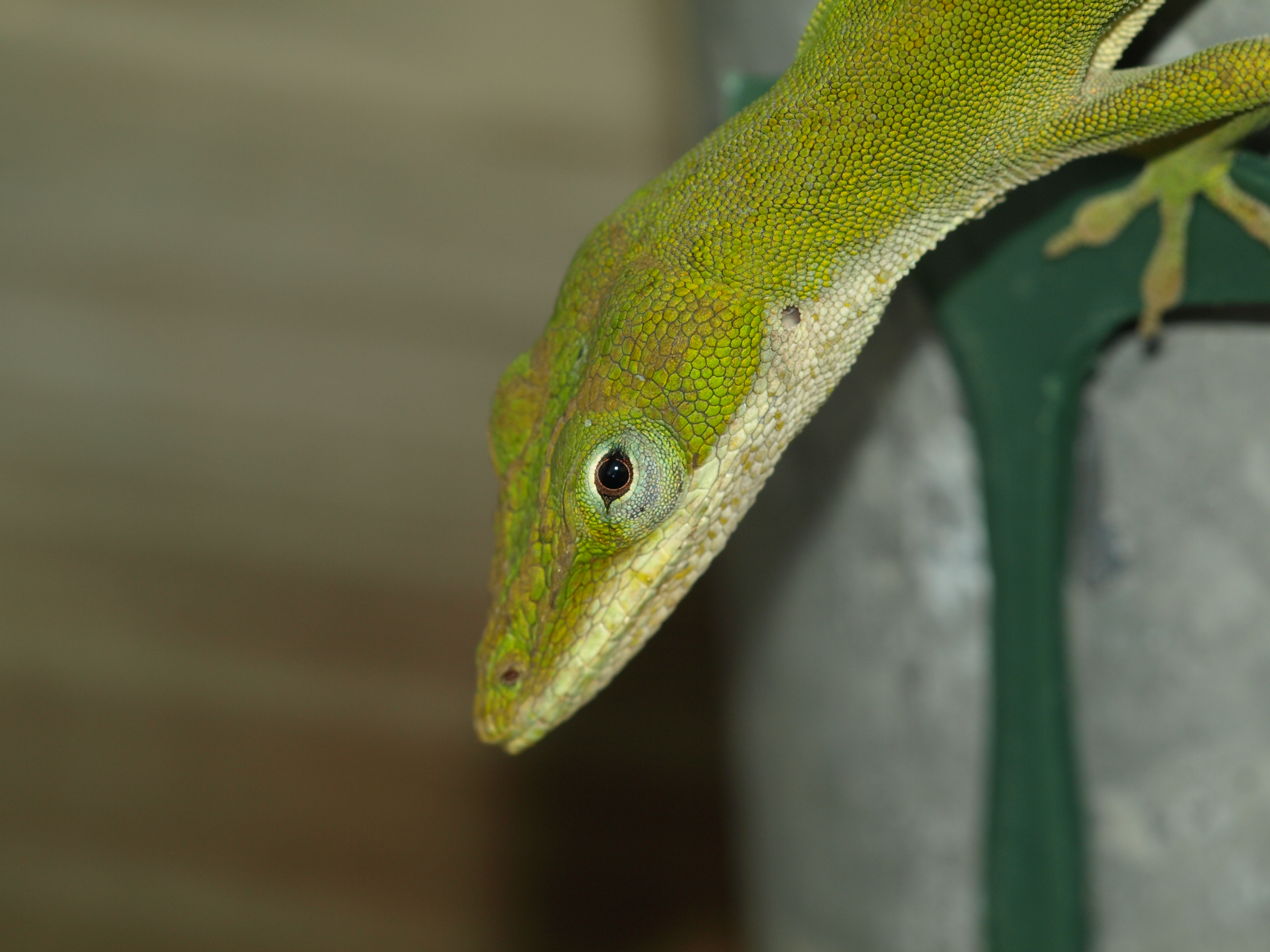
Detail of head, green

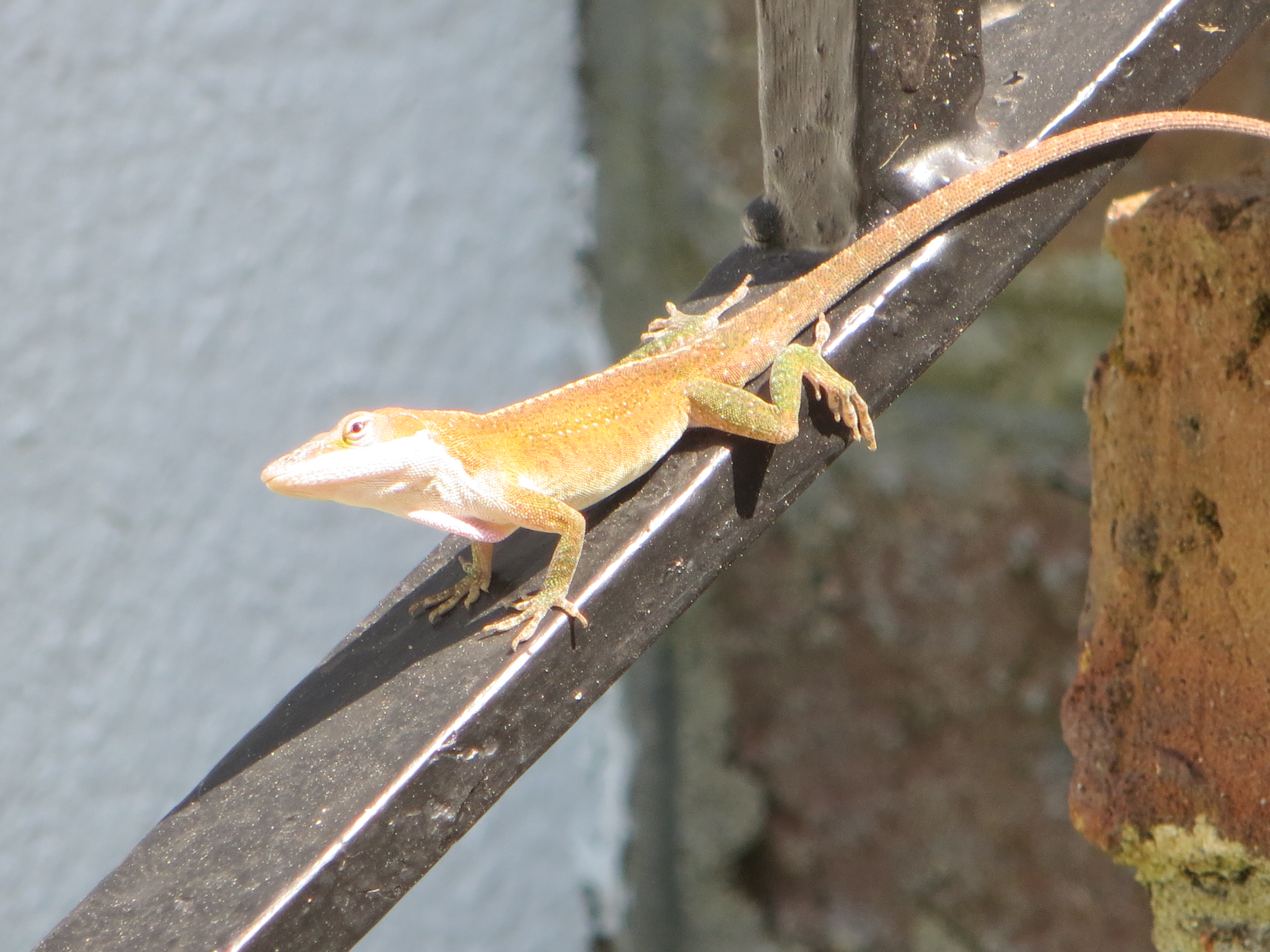
Female (brown form)

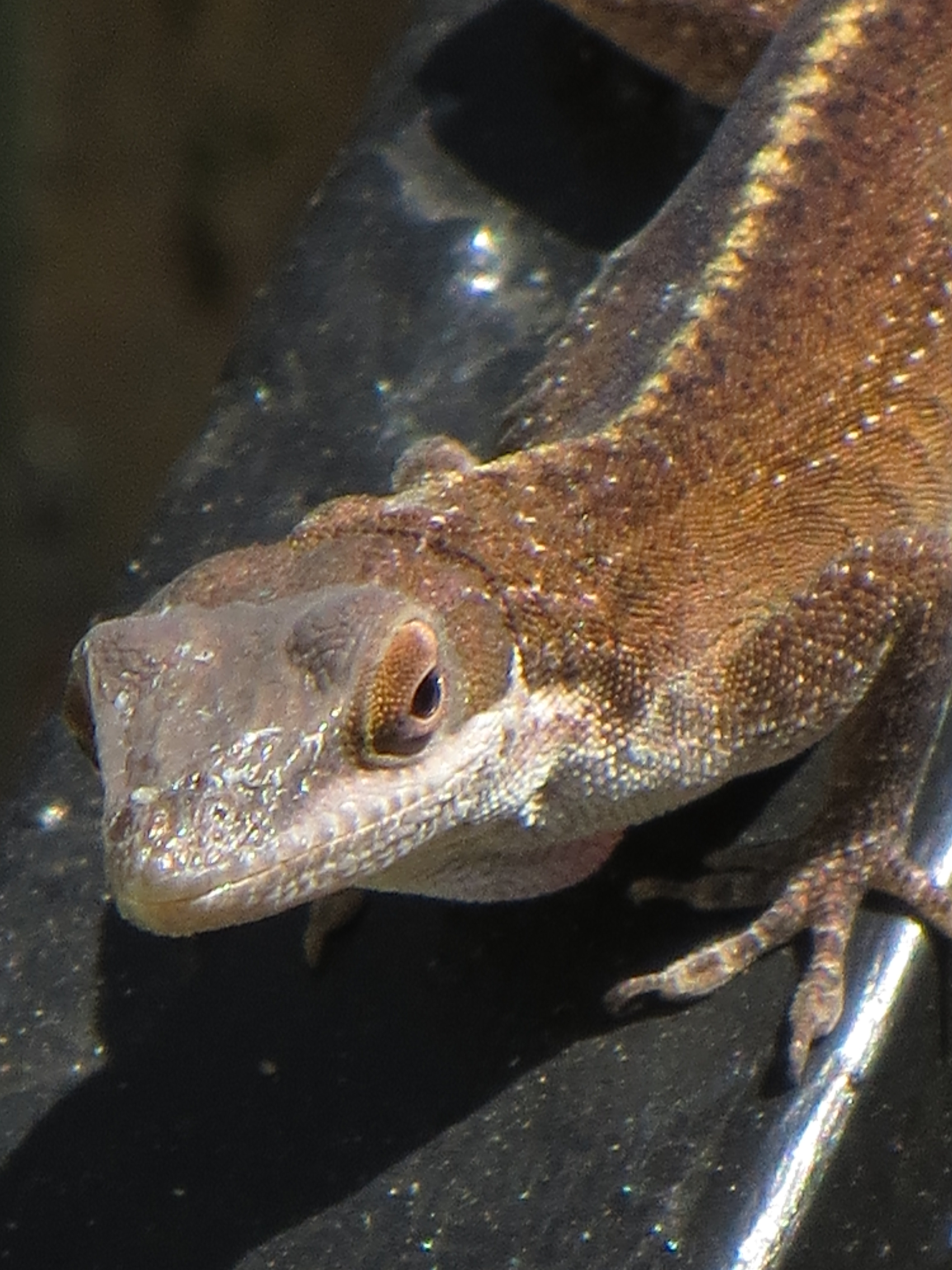
Detail of head, brown

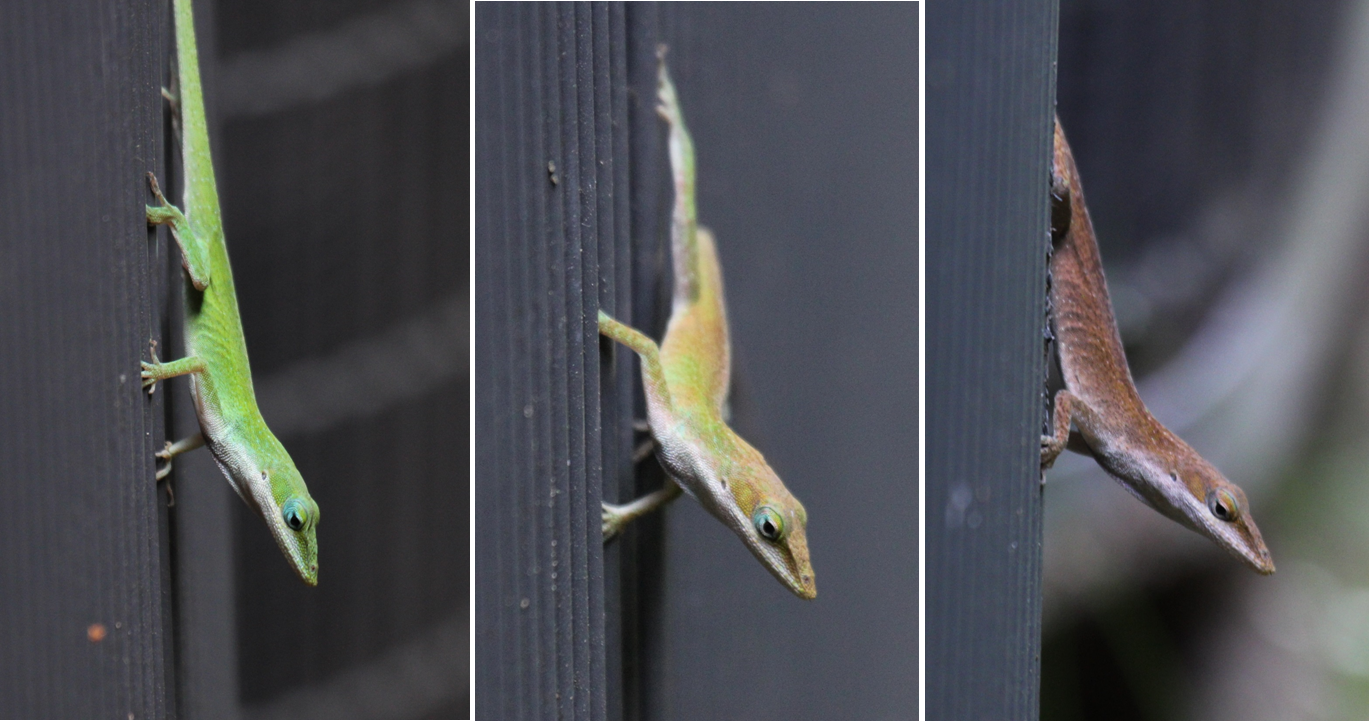
Color change from green phase to brown phase

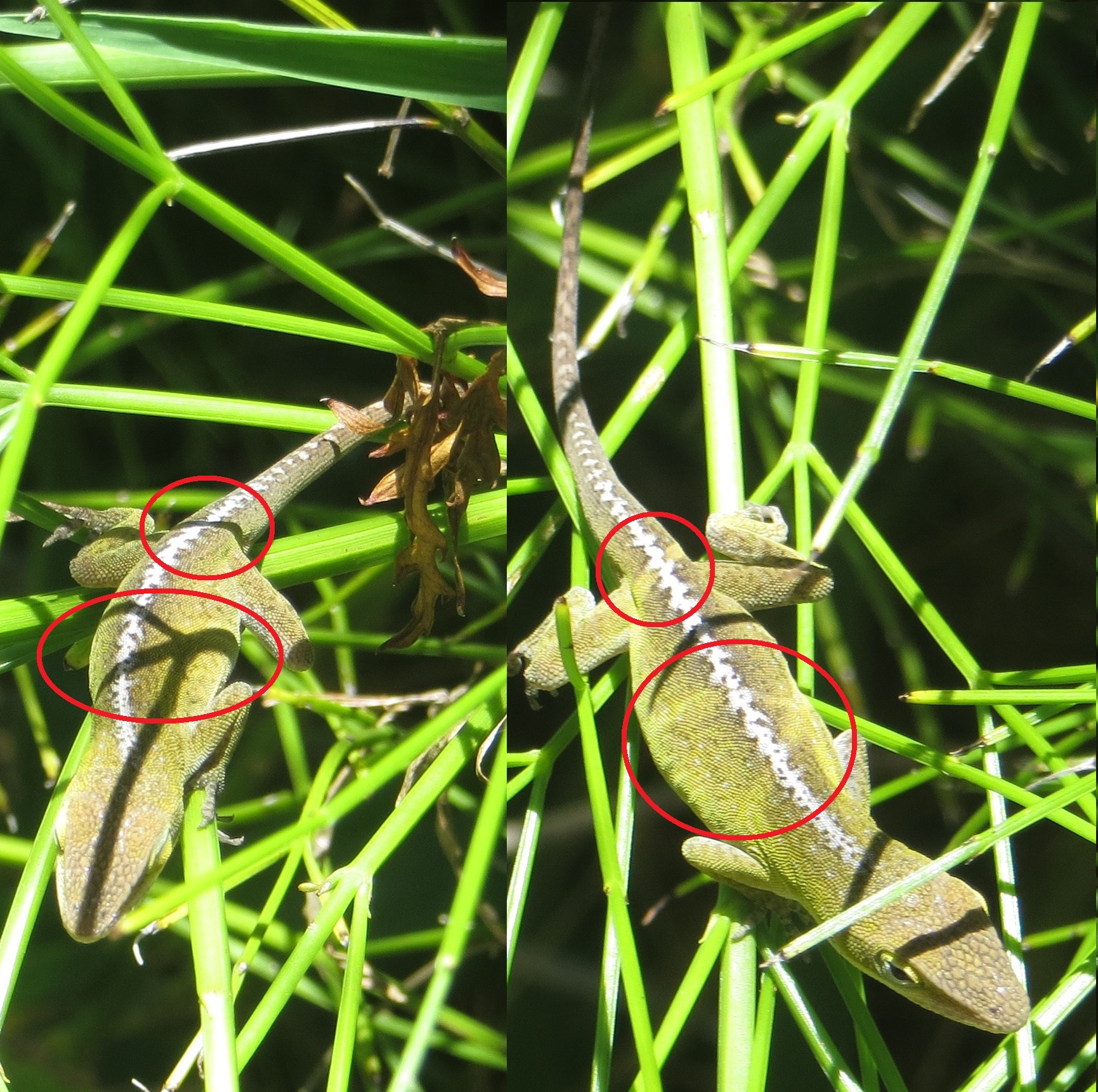
When under a sharp shadow, the skin of the green anole may change color unevenly, temporarily leaving an imprint of the shadow

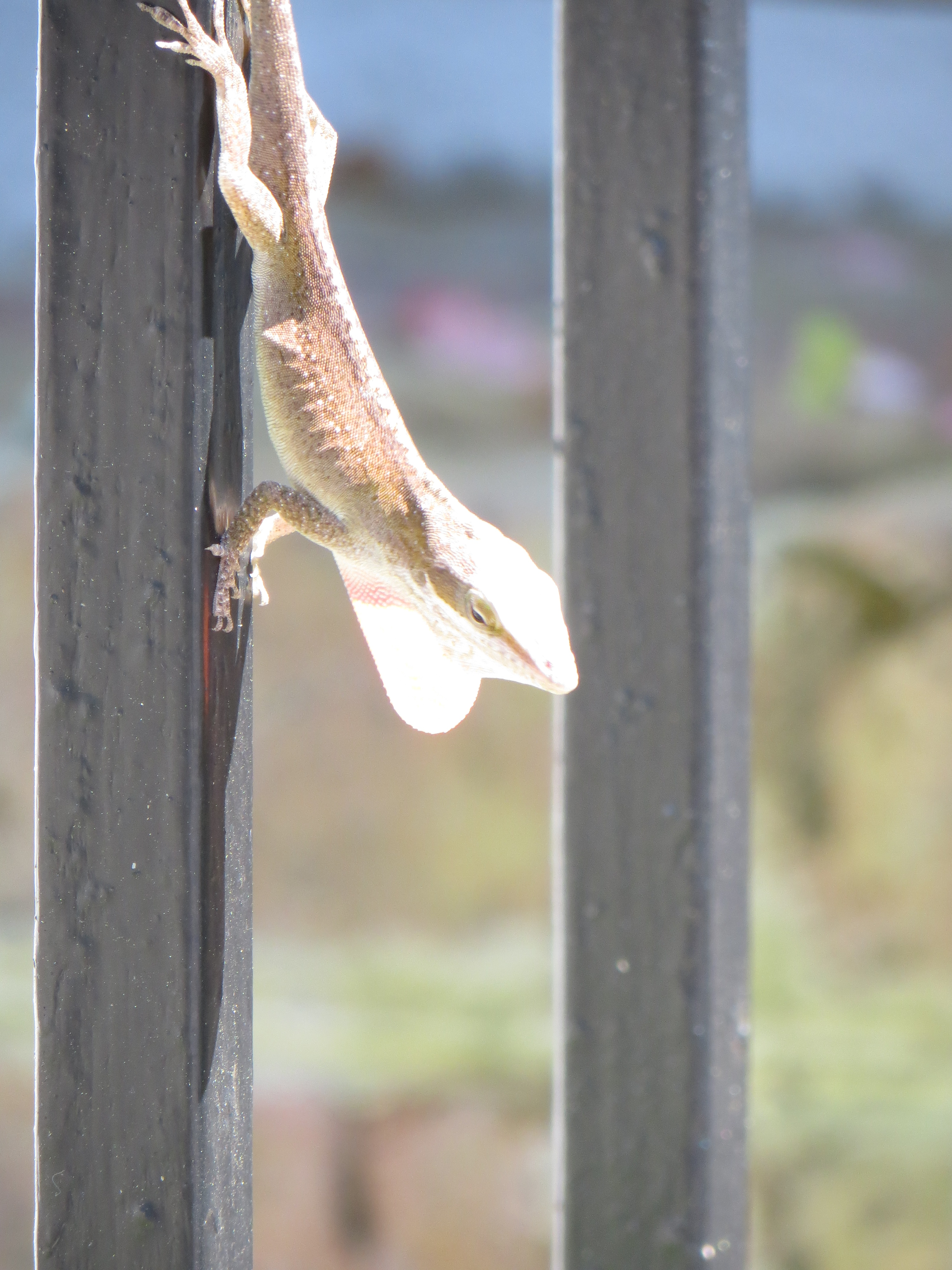
Female (brown) displaying dewlap

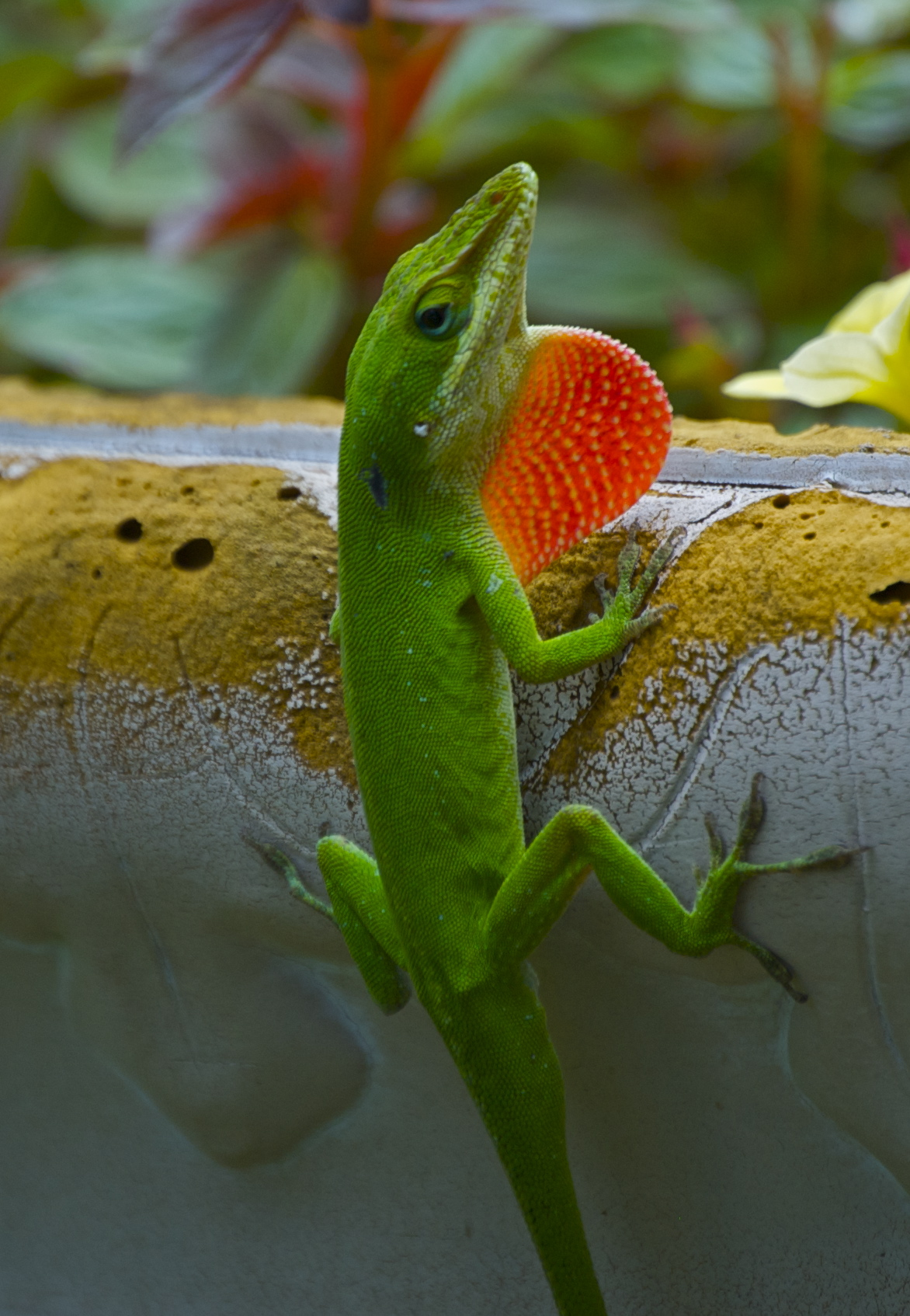
Male anole with extended dewlap

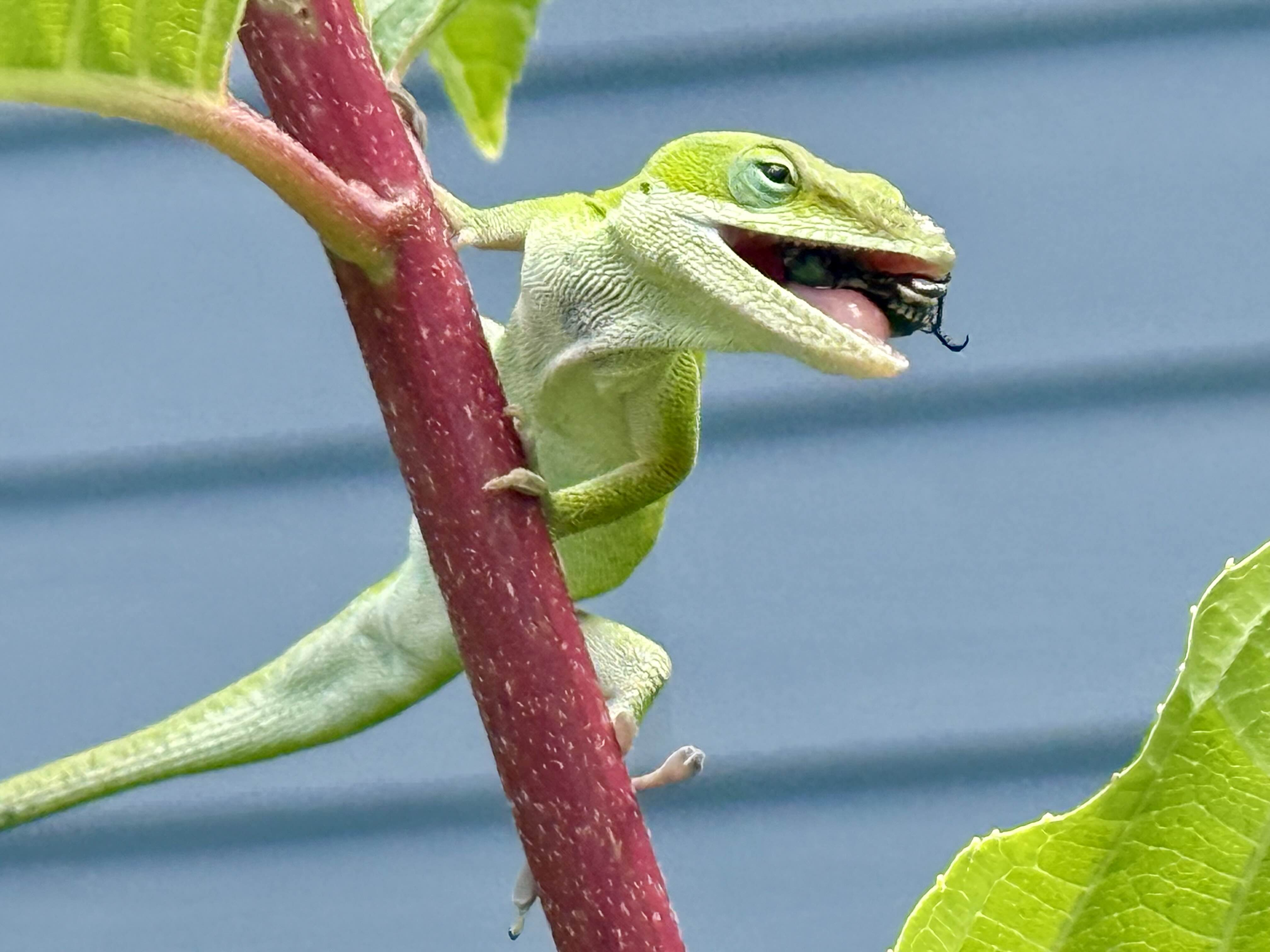
Carolina anole eating an invasive Japanese Beetle
