= Anolis viridulus =

Scientific classification
- Kingdom: Animalia
- Phylum: Chordata
- Class: Reptilia
- Order: Squamata
- Suborder: Iguania
- Family: Dactyloidae
- Genus: Anolis
- Species: A. viridulus

Binomial name
- Anolis viridulus Díaz, Cádiz, Velazco, & Kawata, 2022

Species of lizard

Anolis viridulus, also known as the western dwarf green anole, is a species of lizard (anole) in the family Dactyloidae.The species is endemic to western Cuba.

== Taxonomy ==
This species was formally described in 2022 based on genetic and morphological distinctions from other Cuban green anoles.

=== Phylogeny ===
A. viridulus is closely related to A. altitudinalis, A. oporinus, and A. toldo, species endemic to Cuba. Phylogenetic analyses based on mitochondrial and nuclear gene sequences confirmed that A. viridulus is genetically distinct and exhibits 7–9% divergence from its closest relatives.

=== Etymology ===
The specific epithet viridulus is derived from the Latin diminutive for "green", reflecting the green coloration and small size of this anole.

== Description ==
A. viridulus is a small species with a laterally depressed body and flat head. Adults exhibit a maximum snout-vent length (SVL) of approximately 44.6 mm in males and 43.7 mm in females. The species is characterized by a combination of small limbs and a tapering tail, smooth to keeled scales and squeaky vocalizations when touched. Furthermore, the species lacks the prominent white supralabial stripe and supraxillary spot found in A. altitudinalis. It also has distinct fourth toe lamellae counts and postmental scale patterns compared to other subgroup members.

== Distribution ==
The species is found in the Cordillera de Guaniguanico, with known populations in Las Terrazas, Sierra del Rosario (Artemisa Province), and Moncada, Viñales (Pinar del Río Province). Its estimated extent of occurrence (EOO) is 860 km².

== Natural history ==
A. viridulus demonstrates territorial behaviors consisting of males showing lateral compression and dewlap extension. Tail injuries in captured specimens suggest physical interactions. They are primarily arboreal, walking with an upright posture on horizontal leaves. Specimens have been observed on Calophyllum antillanum, Cojoba arborea, and Zanthoxylum martinicense trees at heights of 1.6 to 4 meters.

== Conservation ==
The species is endemic to protected areas, including Sierra del Rosario Biosphere Reserve and Parque Nacional Viñales.
