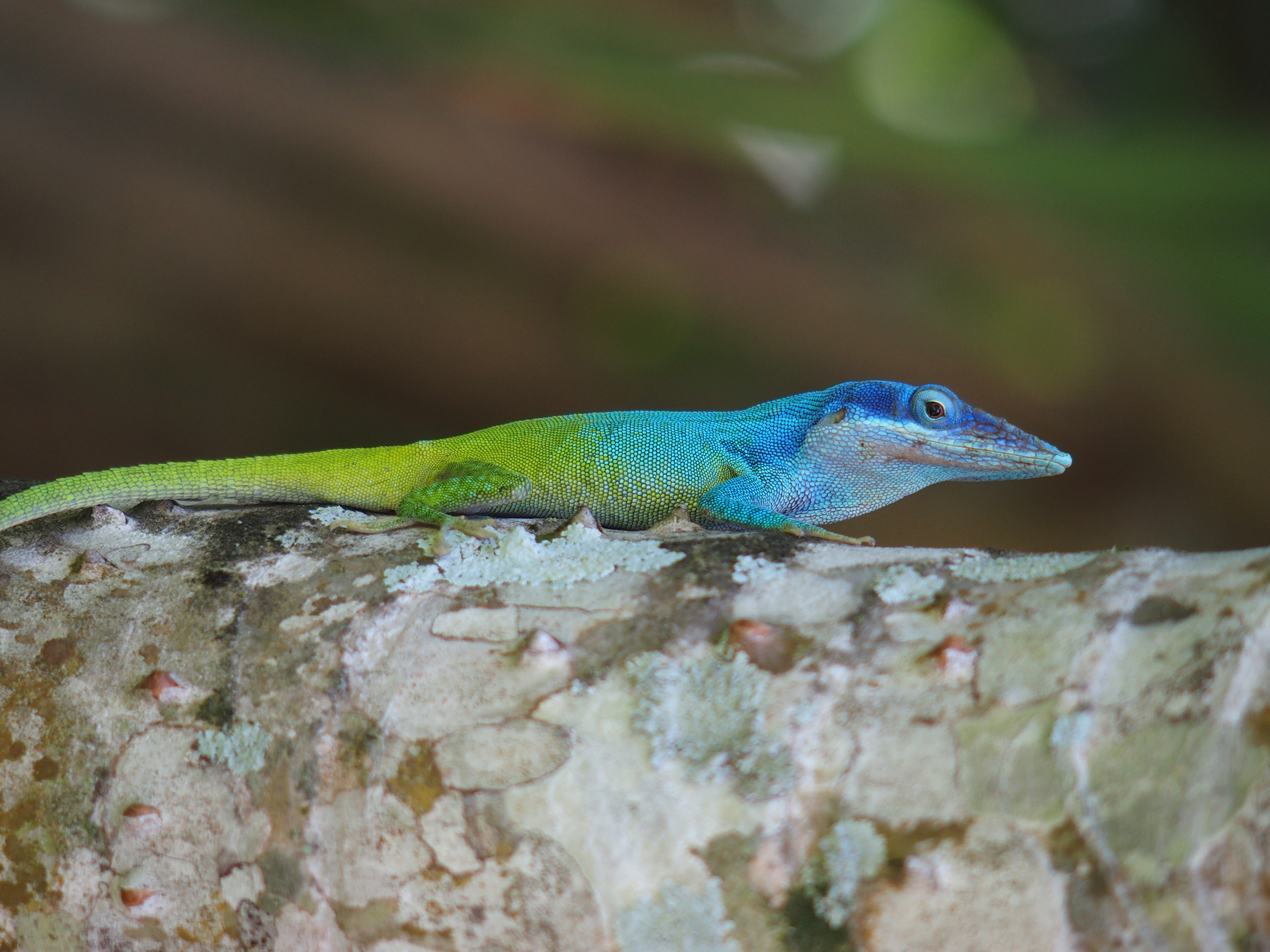

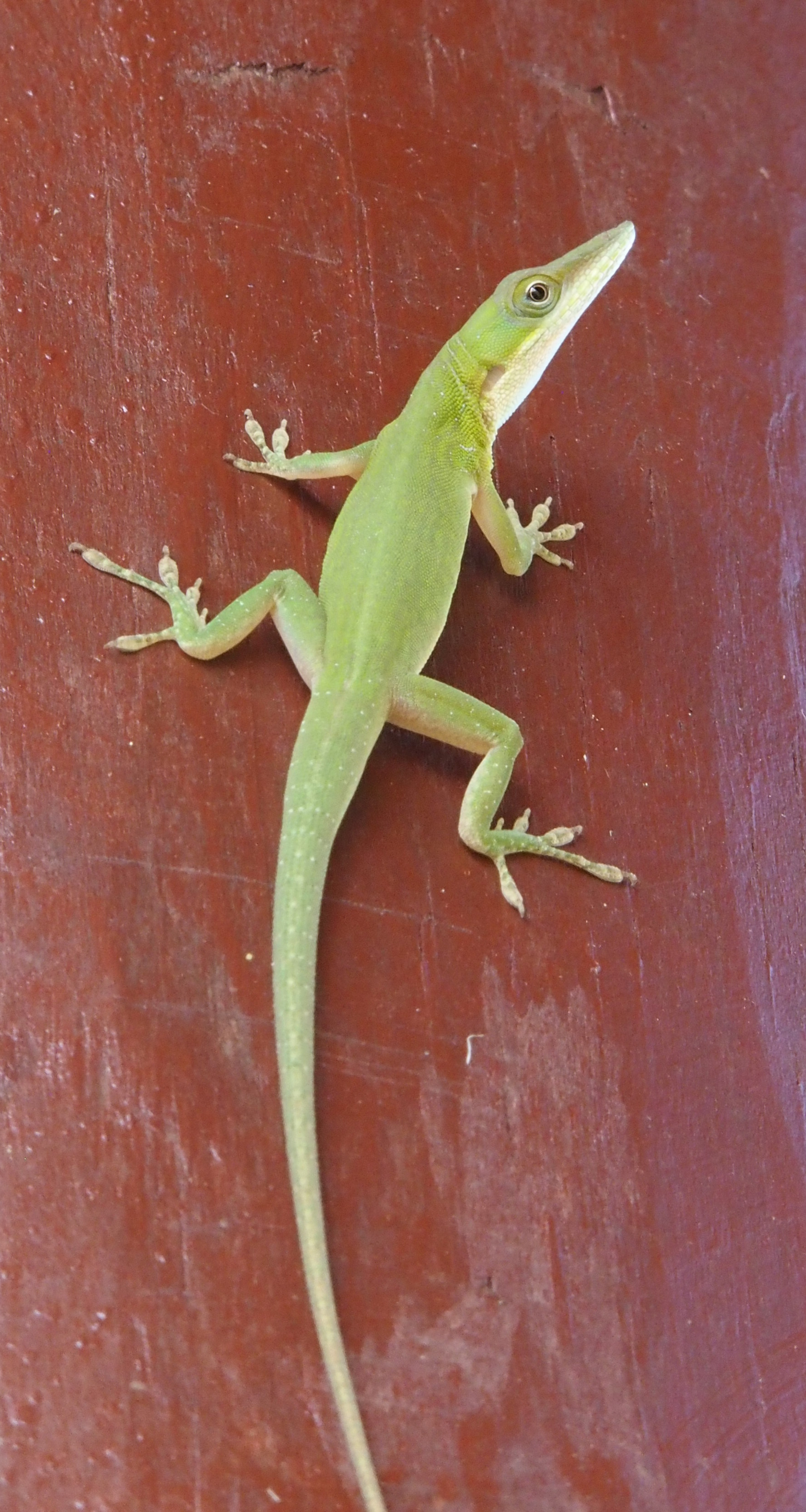
- male above, female below

Conservation status
- Least Concern (IUCN 3.1)

Scientific classification
- Kingdom: Animalia
- Phylum: Chordata
- Class: Reptilia
- Order: Squamata
- Suborder: Iguania
- Family: Anolidae
- Genus: Anolis
- Species: A. allisoni

Binomial name
- Anolis allisoni Barbour, 1928

= Anolis allisoni =

Allison's anole

Species of reptile

Anolis allisoni, also known commonly as Allison's anole or Cuban blue anole is a species of lizard in the family Dactyloidae. The species is endemic to Cuba (except the west and the far southeast), the Bay Islands and Cayos Cochinos off the mainland of Honduras, and Half Moon Caye off the mainland of Belize. There is also a single doubtful record from Cozumel, Mexico. Recently, the species has been documented in southern Florida. This diurnal species is commonly seen on palm trunks, and it feeds on invertebrates. It is among the relatively few anole species in which females may lay their eggs together, forming a communal nest.

== Etymology ==
The specific name, allisoni, is in honor of American philanthropist Mr. Allison Vincent Armour.

== Taxonomy ==
A. allisoni is part of the carolinensis group of anoles, a clade of mid-sized trunk-crown anoles thought to have originated in Cuba. It is very closely related to other anoles of this group such as the American green anole, Anolis carolinensis, and its Cuban "cousin" Anolis porcatus.

== Description ==
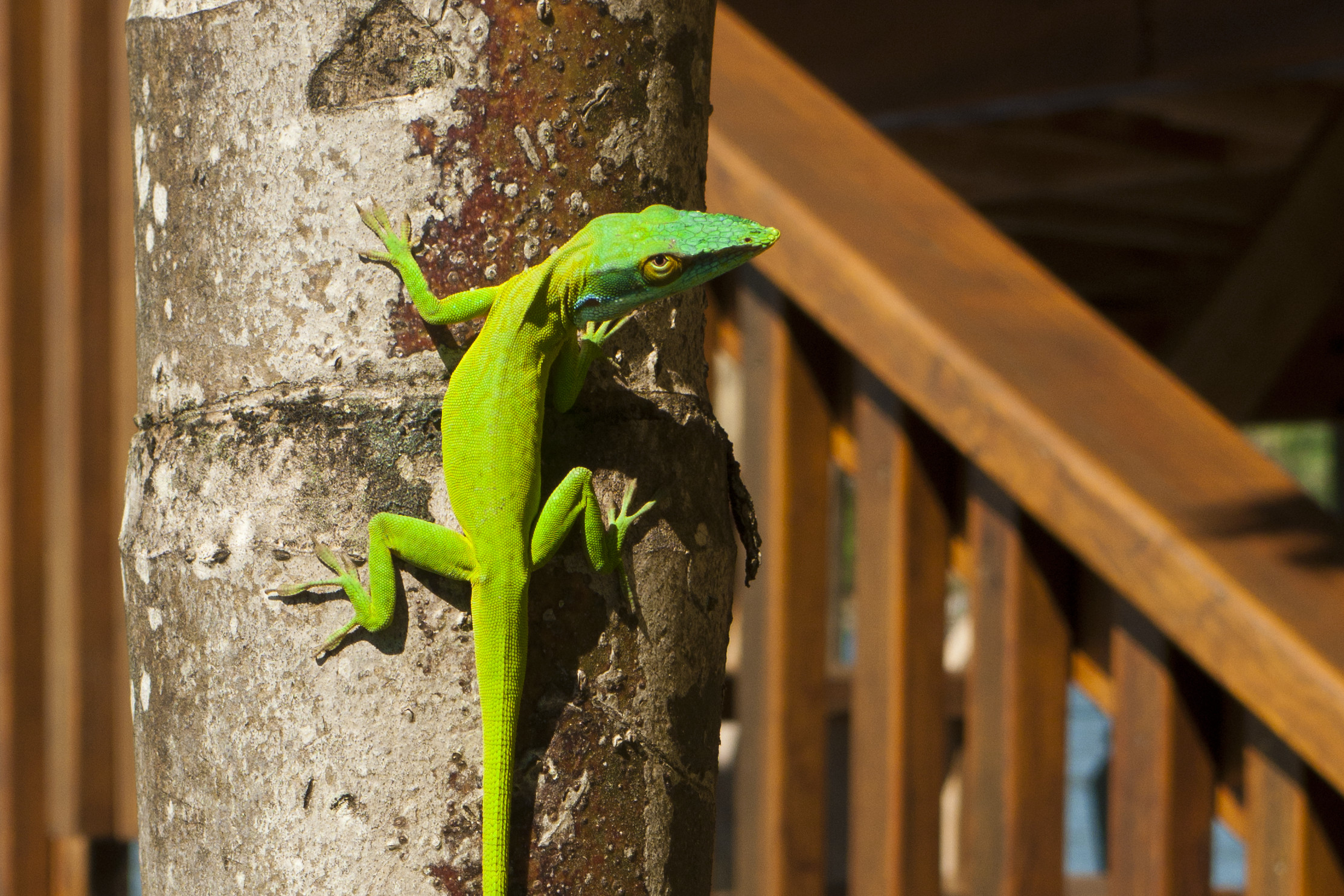
Honduran males, like this individual from Roatan, have much less blue than males from elsewhere

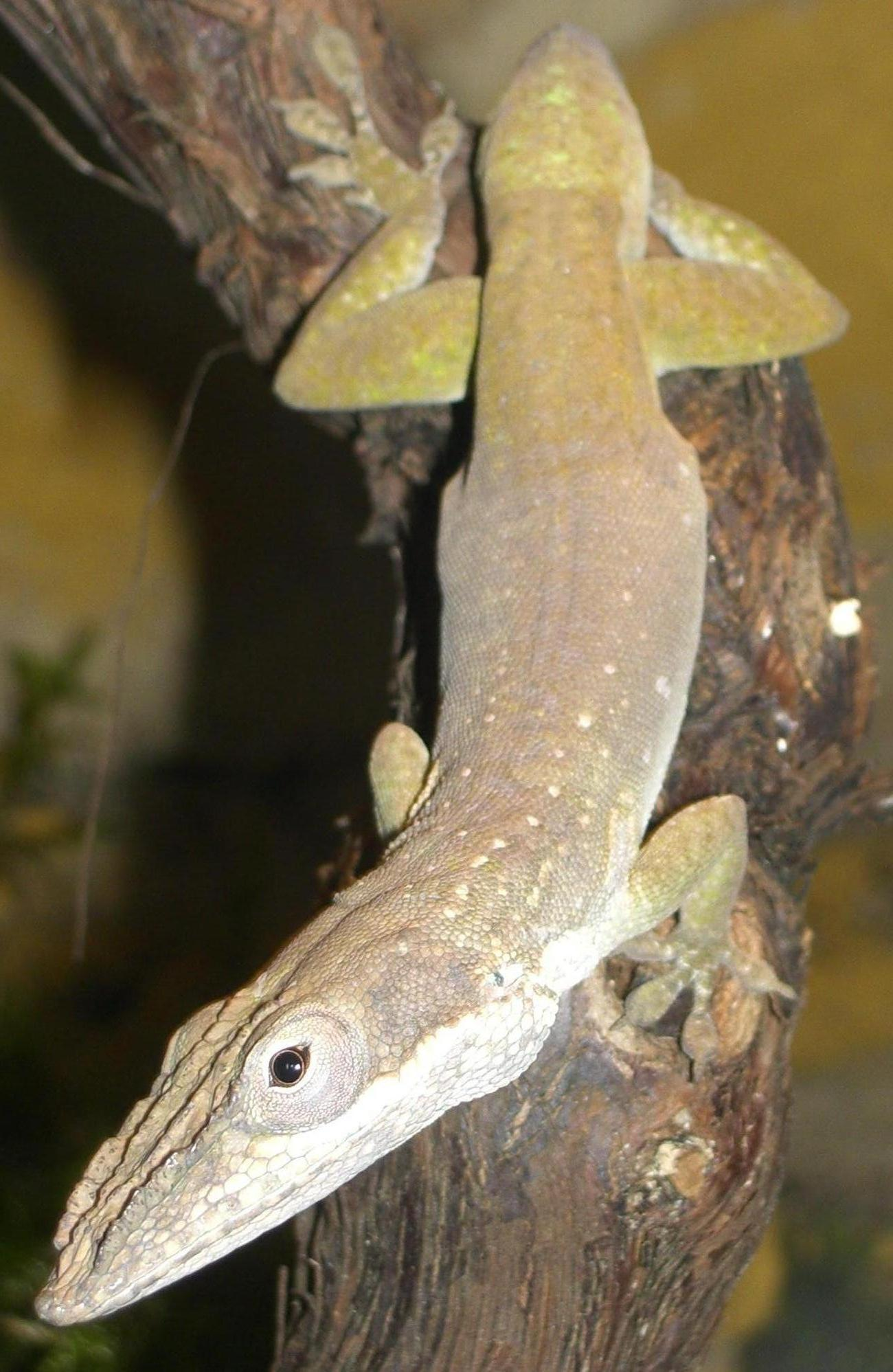
Brown colour phase

In terms of colour and morphology, Allison's anole is superficially similar to the better-known American green anole. While females are overall green with paler underparts, similar to the green anole, males have a reddish-pink dewlap, and typically have bright blue heads, forelegs, and frontal half of the body (in males from Honduras, only parts of the head are blue with the remaining green). In all individuals the throat is usually white. Both sexes are able to rapidly change their colour to brown. Females reach about 7.5 cm (3 in) in snout-vent length and males about 10 cm (4 in). It is one of the larger species in the carolinensis species group. Allison's anole is a typical trunk-crown anole. Like other anoles in the carolinensis group, it has a large, conspicuously triangular-shaped head, and males have a prominent nuchal crest. This lizard has large subdigital toepads, which help facilitate climbing and clinging to vertical surfaces.

== Distribution and habitat ==
=== Distribution ===
A. allisoni is believed to have originated on Cuba but has since spread to Honduras and Half Moon Caye. This migration is believed to have occurred long ago as the different populations on these three locations display sufficient phenotypical and genetic differentiation to be considered for subspecies status. Few specimens have been identified in Mexican Banco Chinchorro island. A. allisoni has been documented in several neighborhoods within southern Florida, surviving and apparently breeding in both small parks and residential housing. This population is likely of Cuban origin and was brought to Florida as eggs accidentally ferried with plants.

=== Habitat ===
A. allisoni is a trunk-crown anole, meaning that it is commonly found in the canopy and on the upper trunk of tall trees. It is commonly found up to 1.5 m (4.9 ft) off the ground. This anole has evolved large subdigital toepads, compared to most other anoles, and this adaptations helps it to cling to vertical surfaces such as the trunks of trees. This lizard is most commonly seen on coconut palm trees. Before coconuts were introduced to the island of Half Moon Caye the lizard probably occupied a similar niche in the crowns of salt water palmettos (Thrinax radiata), which was exterminated from the island in 1982. It has been suggested that this plant be reintroduced to the island to provide habitat for the lizards, especially since the coconut palm population on Half Moon Caye has been gradually declining. In more urban areas this lizard may be commonly be seen on walls and other man-made structures. It is a common sight on the island of Cuba, where its population is largest. In Florida, the introduced populations are restricted to a few neighborhoods as of 2021. Their numbers are likely growing as many residents have become aware of the lizards, which show no fear of humans and regularly climb on building walls and nest in yards.

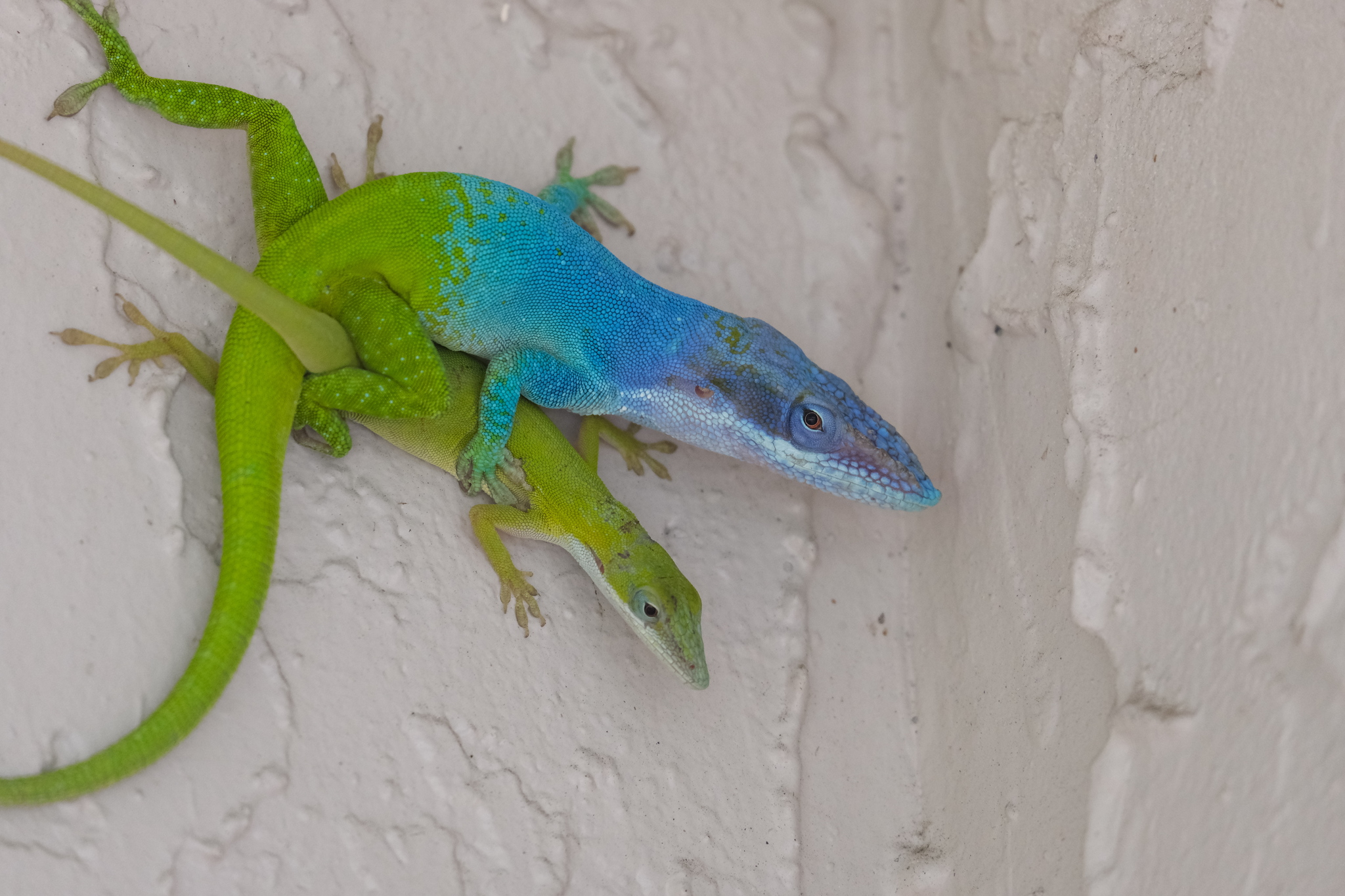
Mating

== See also ==
- List of Anolis lizards
