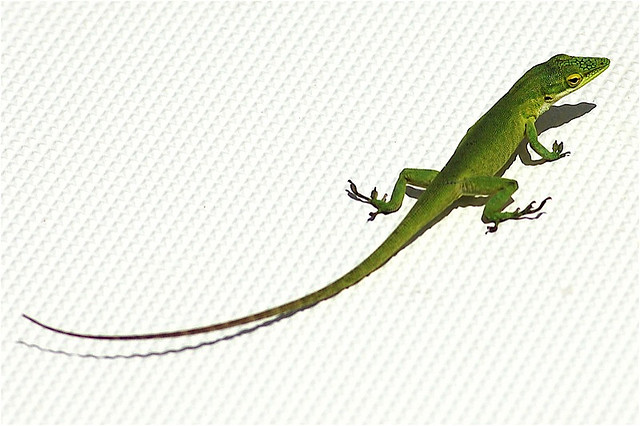

Conservation status
- Least Concern (IUCN 3.1)

Scientific classification
- Kingdom: Animalia
- Phylum: Chordata
- Class: Reptilia
- Order: Squamata
- Suborder: Iguania
- Family: Dactyloidae
- Genus: Anolis
- Species: A. smaragdinus

Binomial name
- Anolis smaragdinus Barbour & Shreve, 1935

= Anolis smaragdinus =

Species of lizard

Anolis smaragdinus, also known commonly as the Bahamian green anole, is a species of lizard in the family Dactyloidae. The species is native to the Bahamas. There are two recognized subspecies.

== Taxonomy ==
A. smaragdinus is part of the A. carolinensis series of anoles.

== Geographic range ==
A. smaragdinus is endemic to the Bahamas.

== Habitat ==
A. smaragdinus is found in a variety of habitats, including forest, shrubland, and introduced vegetation.

== Diet ==
A. smaragdinus preys upon insects, spiders, and snails, and also eats plant material.

== Reproduction ==
A. smaragdinus is oviparous.

== Subspecies ==
Two subspecies are recognized as being valid, including the nominotypical subspecies:

- Anolis smaragdinus lerneri Oliver, 1948
- Anolis smaragdinus smaragdinus Barbour & Shreve, 1935

== Etymology ==
The subspecific name, lerneri, is in honor of American businessman Michael Lerner, a patron of the American Museum of Natural History.

== Taxonomy ==
A. smaragdinus is a member of the A. carolinensis species group.
