= Anolis fairchildi =

Conservation status
- Vulnerable (IUCN 3.1)

Scientific classification
- Kingdom: Animalia
- Phylum: Chordata
- Class: Reptilia
- Order: Squamata
- Suborder: Iguania
- Family: Anolidae
- Genus: Anolis
- Species: A. fairchildi

Binomial name
- Anolis fairchildi Barbour & Shreve, 1935

Synonyms
- Anolis fairchildi Barbour & Shreve, 1935; Anolis smaragdinus fairchildi — A. Schwartz & Thomas, 1975; Anolis fairchildi — A. Schwartz & Henderson, 1991; Anolis fairchildi — Nicholson et al., 2018

Species of lizard

Anolis fairchildi, also known commonly as the Cay Sal anole and Fairchild's anole, is a species of lizard in the family Dactyloidae. The species is native to the Bahamas.

== Etymology ==
The specific name, fairchildi, is in honor of American botanist David Grandison Fairchild.

== Geographic range ==
A. fairchildi is endemic to Cay Sal Bank in the Bahamas.

== Habitat ==
The preferred natural habitat of A. fairchildi is dry shrubland.

== Reproduction ==
A. fairchildi is oviparous.

== Taxonomy ==
A. fairchildi is a member of the A. carolinensis species group.
