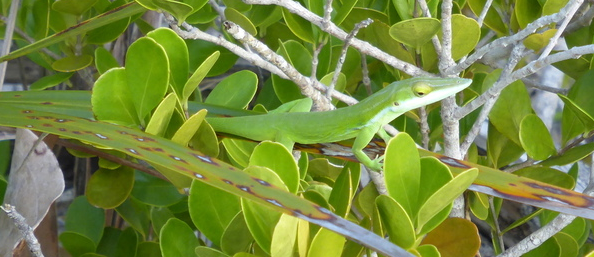

Conservation status
- Least Concern (IUCN 3.1)

Scientific classification
- Kingdom: Animalia
- Phylum: Chordata
- Class: Reptilia
- Order: Squamata
- Suborder: Iguania
- Family: Anolidae
- Genus: Anolis
- Species: A. maynardii

Binomial name
- Anolis maynardii Garman, 1888

= Anolis maynardii =

Species of lizard

Anolis maynardii, also known commonly as Maynard's anole, is a species of lizard in the family Dactyloidae. The species is endemic to the Cayman Islands.

== Etymology ==
The specific name, maynardii, is in honor of American ornithologist Charles Johnson Maynard.

== Behavior ==
Anolis maynardi is arboreal, but it is occasionally found on the ground and in buildings.

== Habitat ==
The preferred natural habitat of Anolis maynardii is forest, at altitudes of 2–12 m (6.6–39.4 ft).

== Reproduction ==
Anolis maynardii is oviparous.

== Taxonomy ==
Anolis maynardii is a member of the Anolis carolinensis species group.
