= Friedrich Siegmund Voigt =

- Born: 1 October 1781; Gotha
- Died: 10 December 1850 (aged 69)
- Scientific career
- Fields: Zoology, Botany
- Author abbrev. (botany): F.Voigt
- Author abbrev. (zoology): Voigt

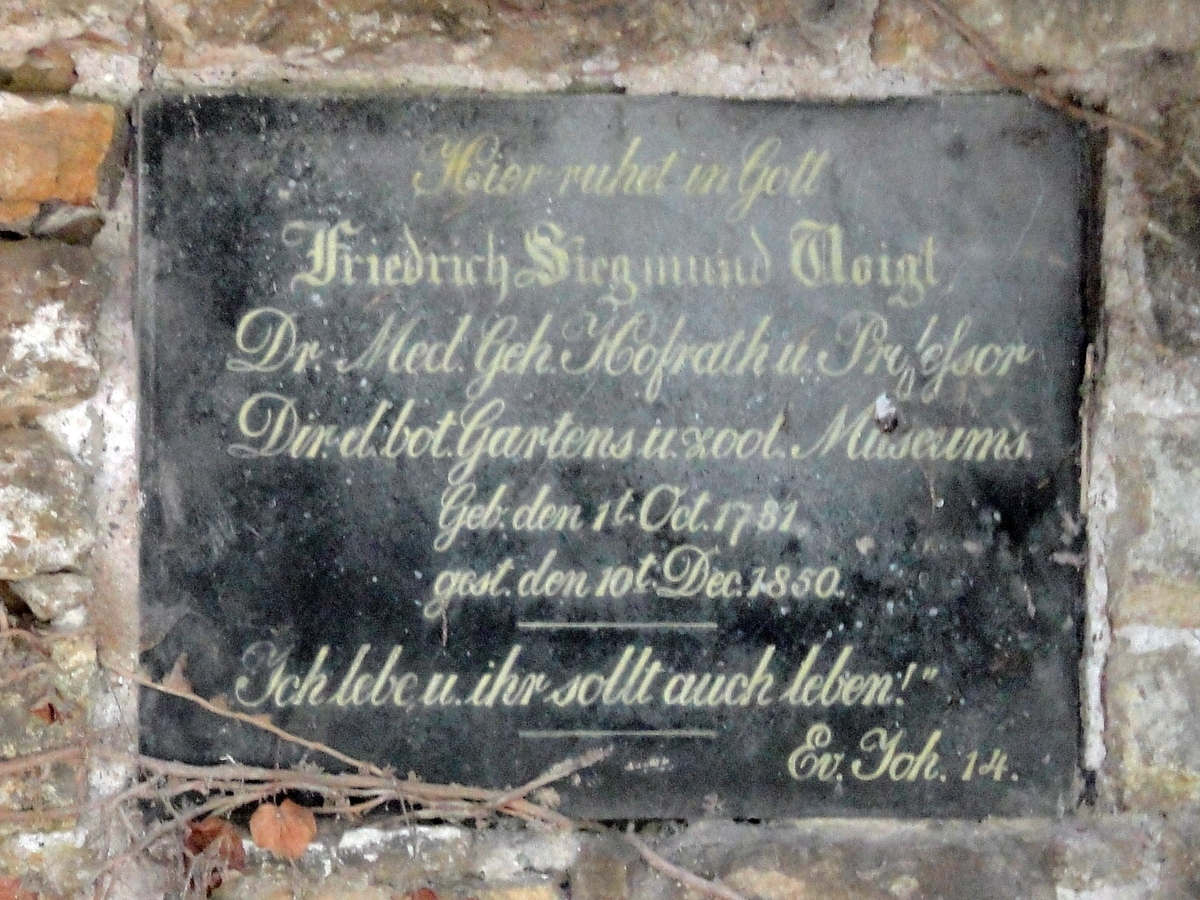
Grave in Jena

Friedrich Siegmund (Sigismund) Voigt (Voight) (1 October 1781 – 10 December 1850) was a German zoologist and botanist, with a special interest in spermatophytes. He taught at Jena, where he translated Georges Cuvier's Le Règne Animal (1817), and was the director of the Jena Botanical Gardens (from 1807 to 1850) and the Museum of Zoology.

He proposed a classification of the animal kingdom with nine classes, based on body structure, such as those that are soft and gelatinous, those that are articulated and have an exoskeleton, and those that have an endoskeleton.

== Publications ==
- 1840. Lehrbuch der Zoologie: Erklärung der 22 Kupfertafeln zu Voigt's Lehrbuch der Zoologie. Volumen 7. Editor Schweizerbart, 8 pp.
- 1850. Geschichte des Pflanzenreichs. Volumen 2. Geschichte des Pflanzenreichs. Editor F. Mauke
- 1835. Lehrbuch der Zoologie. Volumen 1. Naturgeschichte der drei Reiche. Editor E. Schweizerbart, 507 pp.
- 1832. Almanach der Natur. Editor Frommann, 185 pp.
- 1823. System der Natur und Ihre Geschichte. Editor Schmid, 866 pp.
- 1817. Grundzüge einer Naturgeschichte, als Geschichte der Entstehung und weiteren Ausbildung der Naturkörper. Editor H.L. Brönner, 679 pp.
- 1816. Die Farben der organischen Körper. Editor In der Crökerschen Buchhandlung, 223 pp.
- 1808. System der Botanik. 394 pp.
- 1806. Darstellung des natürlichen Pflanzensystems von Jussieu, nach seinen neuesten Verbesserungen: In Tabellen. Editor Reclam, 28 pp.
- 1803. Handwörterbuch der botanischen Kunstsprache. Editor Bey Wolfgang Stahl, 269 pp.

== Bibliography ==
- Julius Viktor Carus (1880). Histoire de la zoologie depuis l’Antiquité jusqu’au XIXe siècle. Baillière (Paris) : viii + 623 p.
