= Gut loading =

Gut loading is the process by which an animal's prey is raised and fed nutritious foods with the intention of passing those nutrients to the animal for which the prey is intended. This term is used most often in reference to the preparation of insects, such as crickets and mealworms, or mice which are used as food for reptile pets. Insects that are raised commercially for the pet trade are themselves of little nutritional value. By providing the prey animals with a high quality diet prior to feeding, they become a more nutritious meal for the predator.

Gut loading can be accomplished by providing fruits, vegetables, and cereals or a nutritionally complete manufactured diet. Several commercial products are available and are fortified specifically for gut loading. These products often include varying combinations of carbohydrates, fats, proteins, vitamins, minerals, and dietary fiber.
