= Anolis isolepis =

Conservation status
- Least Concern (IUCN 3.1)

Scientific classification
- Kingdom: Animalia
- Phylum: Chordata
- Class: Reptilia
- Order: Squamata
- Suborder: Iguania
- Family: Dactyloidae
- Genus: Anolis
- Species: A. isolepis

Binomial name
- Anolis isolepis (Cope, 1861)

Species of lizard

Anolis isolepis, the dwarf green anole or Jatibonico anole, is a species of lizard in the family Dactyloidae. The species is found in Cuba.
