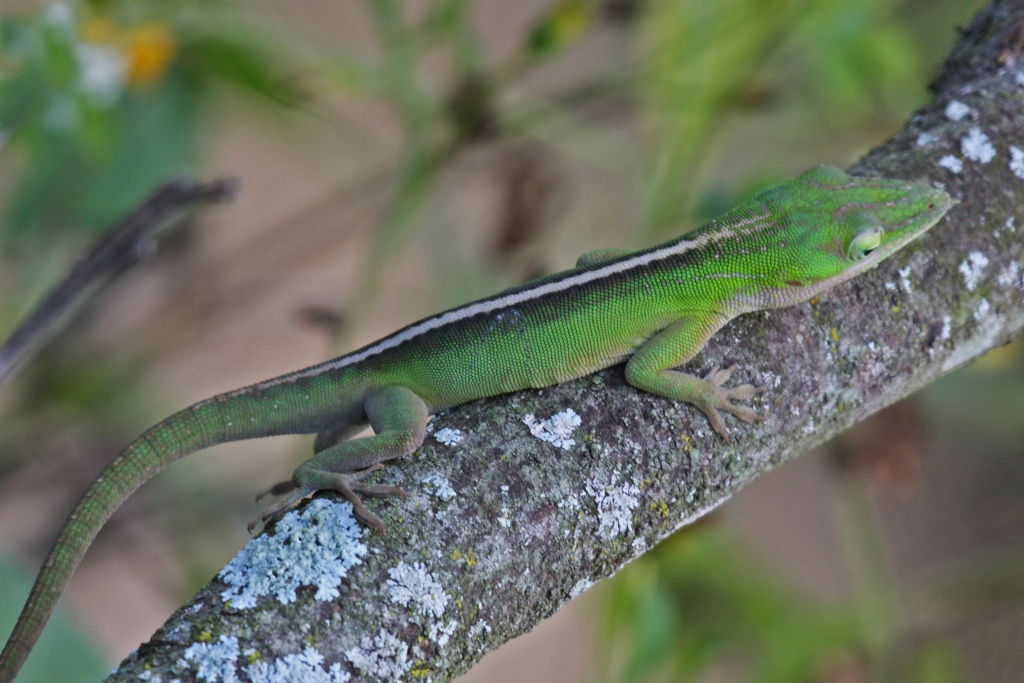
- In Cuba

Conservation status
- Least Concern (IUCN 3.1)

Scientific classification
- Kingdom: Animalia
- Phylum: Chordata
- Class: Reptilia
- Order: Squamata
- Suborder: Iguania
- Family: Dactyloidae
- Genus: Anolis
- Species: A. porcatus

Binomial name
- Anolis porcatus Gray, 1840

= Anolis porcatus =

Cuban green anole

Species of lizard

Anolis porcatus, the Cuban green anole, is a species of anole lizard that is native to Cuba, but has been introduced to Florida, the Dominican Republic, São Paulo, and Tenerife.

The Cuban green anole is part of the A. carolinensis group of anoles.

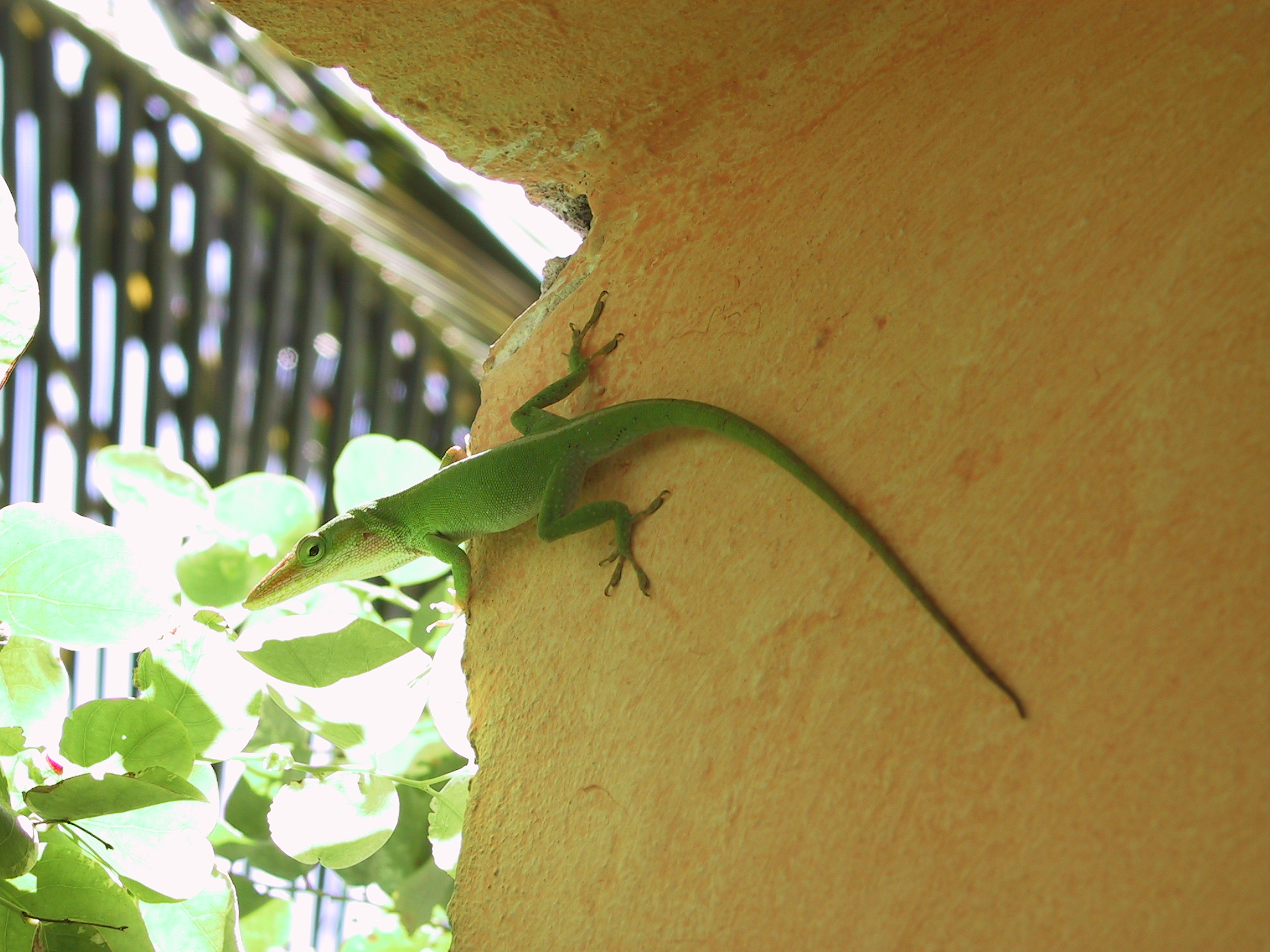
A. porcatus in a rural area, northwest Cuba
