= Anolis brunneus =

Scientific classification
- Kingdom: Animalia
- Phylum: Chordata
- Class: Reptilia
- Order: Squamata
- Suborder: Iguania
- Family: Dactyloidae
- Genus: Anolis
- Species: A. brunneus

Binomial name
- Anolis brunneus Cope, 1894

Species of lizard

Anolis brunneus, the Crooked-Acklins green anole or Crooked lsland anole , is a species of lizard in the family Dactyloidae. The species is found in the Bahamas.
