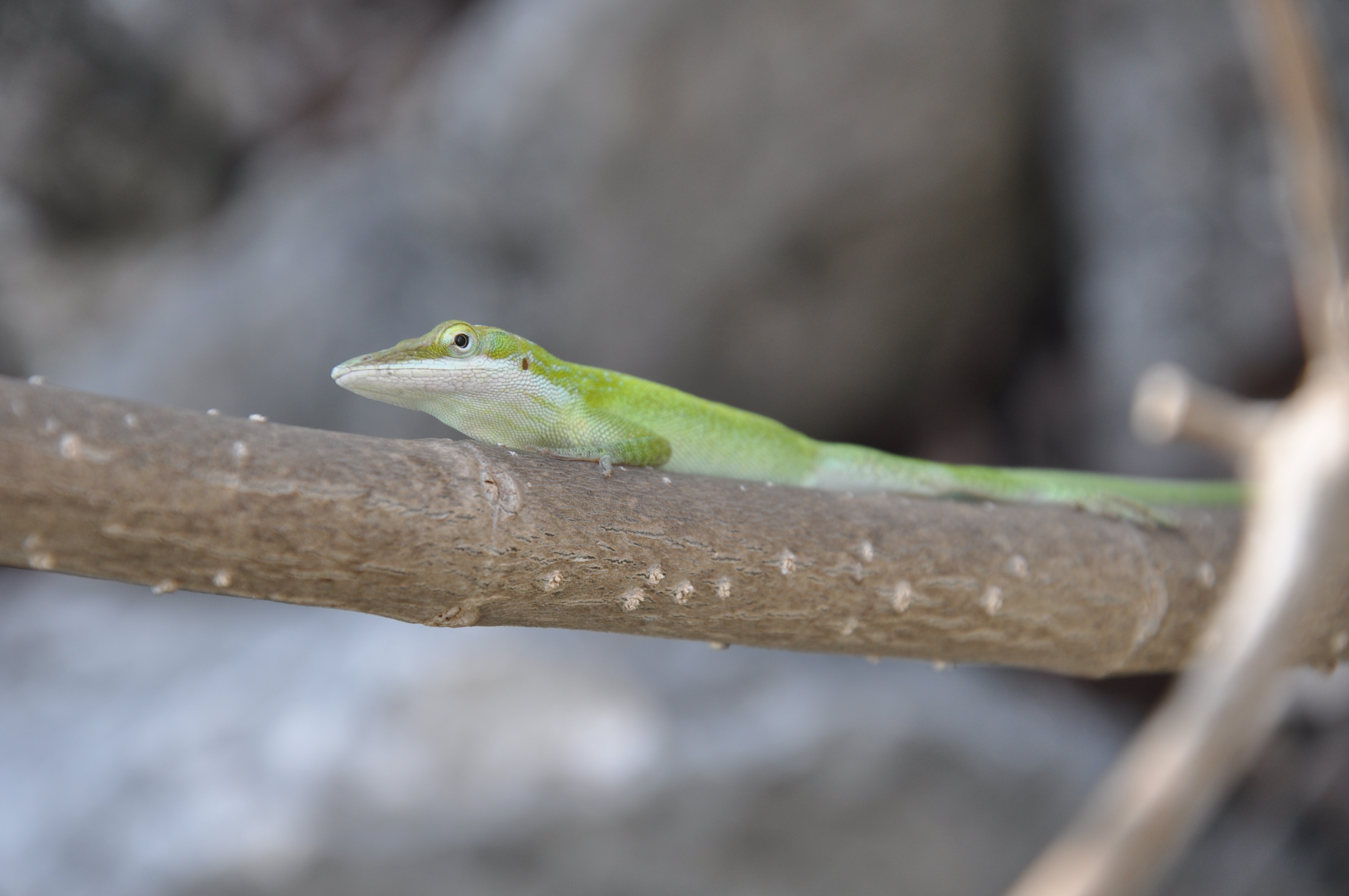

Conservation status
- Least Concern (IUCN 3.1)

Scientific classification
- Kingdom: Animalia
- Phylum: Chordata
- Class: Reptilia
- Order: Squamata
- Suborder: Iguania
- Family: Dactyloidae
- Genus: Anolis
- Species: A. longiceps

Binomial name
- Anolis longiceps Schmidt, 1919

= Anolis longiceps =

Species of lizard

Anolis longiceps, the Navassa anole, is a species of lizard in the family Dactyloidae. The species is endemic to Navassa Island.

== Etymology ==
The Specific name comes from the Latin word for "longhead" which refers to its acuminate snout.
