= Anolis oporinus =

Scientific classification
- Kingdom: Animalia
- Phylum: Chordata
- Order: Squamata
- Suborder: Iguania
- Family: Anolidae
- Genus: Anolis
- Species: A. oporinus

Binomial name
- Anolis oporinus Garrido & Hedges, 2001

Species of lizard

Anolis oporinus, the Pimienta green anole, is a species of lizard in the family Dactyloidae. The species is found in Cuba.
