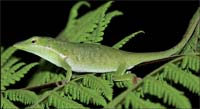

Conservation status
- Near Threatened (IUCN 3.1)

Scientific classification
- Kingdom: Animalia
- Phylum: Chordata
- Order: Squamata
- Suborder: Iguania
- Family: Anolidae
- Genus: Anolis
- Species: A. altitudinalis

Binomial name
- Anolis altitudinalis Garrido, 1985

= Anolis altitudinalis =

Species of lizard

Anolis altitudinalis, the Turquino green-mottled anole, is a species of lizard in the family Dactyloidae. The species is found in Cuba.
