= Anolis toldo =

Conservation status
- Vulnerable (IUCN 3.1)

Scientific classification
- Kingdom: Animalia
- Phylum: Chordata
- Class: Reptilia
- Order: Squamata
- Suborder: Iguania
- Family: Dactyloidae
- Genus: Anolis
- Species: A. toldo

Binomial name
- Anolis toldo Fong & Garrido, 2000

Species of lizard

Anolis toldo, the gray-banded green anole, is a species of lizard in the family Dactyloidae. The species is found in Cuba.
