= Anolis ecomorphs =

Grouping of species of lizard

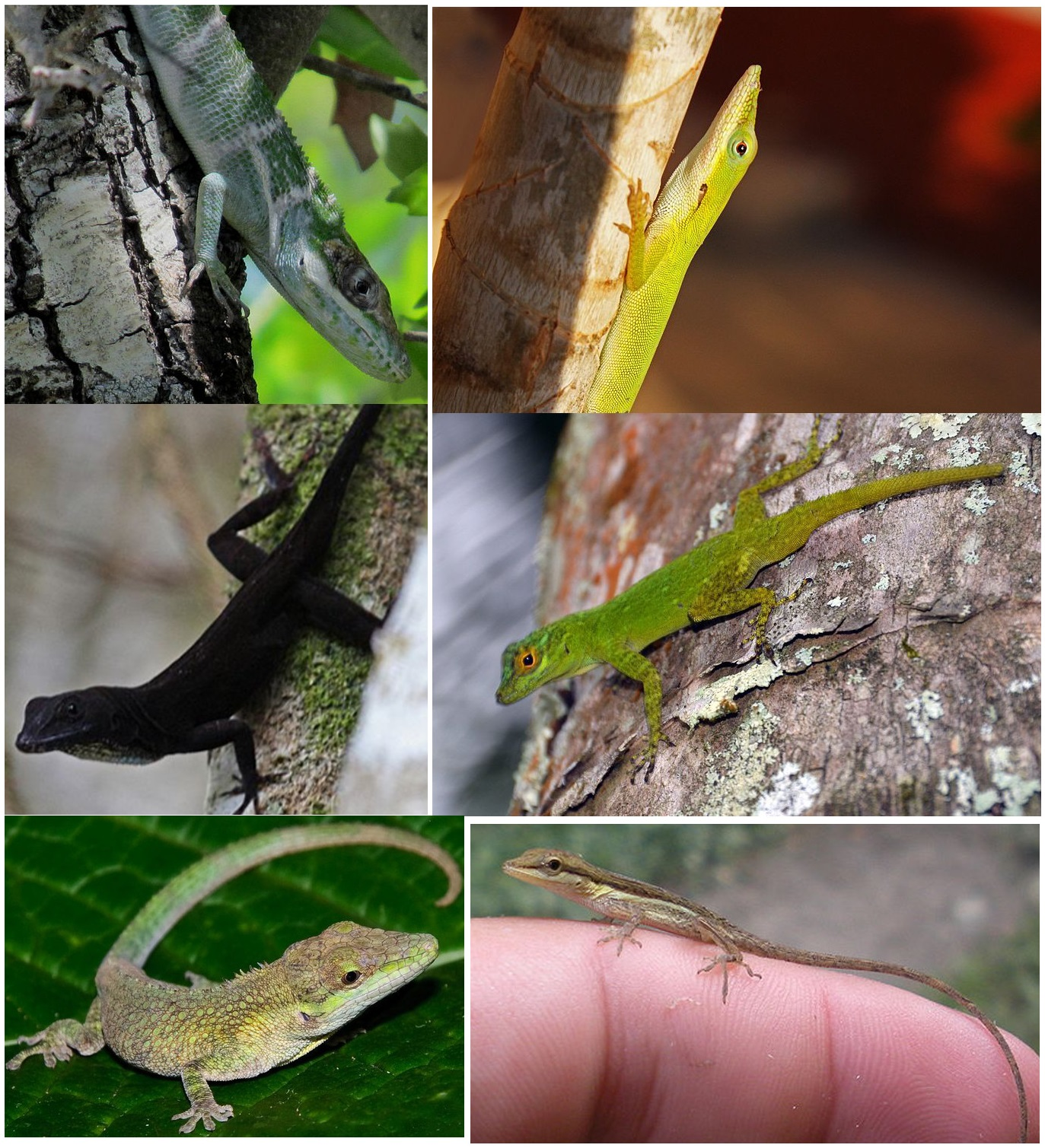
Examples of the six ecomorphs proposed by Williams. Left column, top to bottom: –A. luteogularis (crown giant) –A. homolechis (trunk-ground) –A. heterodermus (twig) Right column, top to bottom: –A. porcatus (trunk-crown) –A. distichus (trunk) –A. pulchellus (grass-bush)

The ecomorph concept is a term first coined by Ernest Edward Williams in 1972 which he defined as a “species with the same structural habitat/niche, similar in morphology and behavior, but not necessarily close phyletically.” Williams first applied this definition to the Greater Antillean anoles (specifically in Puerto Rico) upon observing their evolutionary radiation, although it has since been used widely elsewhere.

Anoles have repeatedly evolved into similar forms on different islands, dubbed 'ecomorphs'. Convergence is in microhabitat specialty, behavior, and morphology. Langerhans, Knouft & Losos call the set of Anolis lizard ecomorphs of the Greater Antilles "a classic example of convergent evolution." Jonathan Losos defined six Anolis ecomorphs according to the predominant microhabitat (e.g. grasses, open ground, different parts of trees) of the respective Anolis: crown giant, trunk-crown, trunk, trunk-ground, twig, and grass-bush.

== Crown giant ecomorph ==
These are anoles which inhabit the uppermost canopy of trees, they all share certain morphological characteristics such as relatively large body size, large heads, large sub-digital lamellae and serrated dorsal crest; most species are predominantly green. Crown giant anoles can be informally subdivided into long-legged species (which move by jumping from tree to tree) and short-legged species (which do not often jump and mostly crawl from one area to another). Because of their large size, these anoles can take a wide range of prey items from smaller lizards to small birds; all species are also known to consume fruit. Though they all share a similar body plan, crown giant anoles vary significantly in size from one island to the other. A few examples of crown giant anoles are shown below.

| Species | Image | Distribution |
|---|---|---|
| Anolis baracoae | Baracoa giant anole | Baracoa, Cuba |
| Anolis ricordii | Ricord's giant anole | Hispaniola |
| Anolis cuvieri | Cuvier's anole | Puerto Rico |
| Anolis garmani | Jamaican giant anole | Jamaica, introduced to Florida and the Cayman Islands |

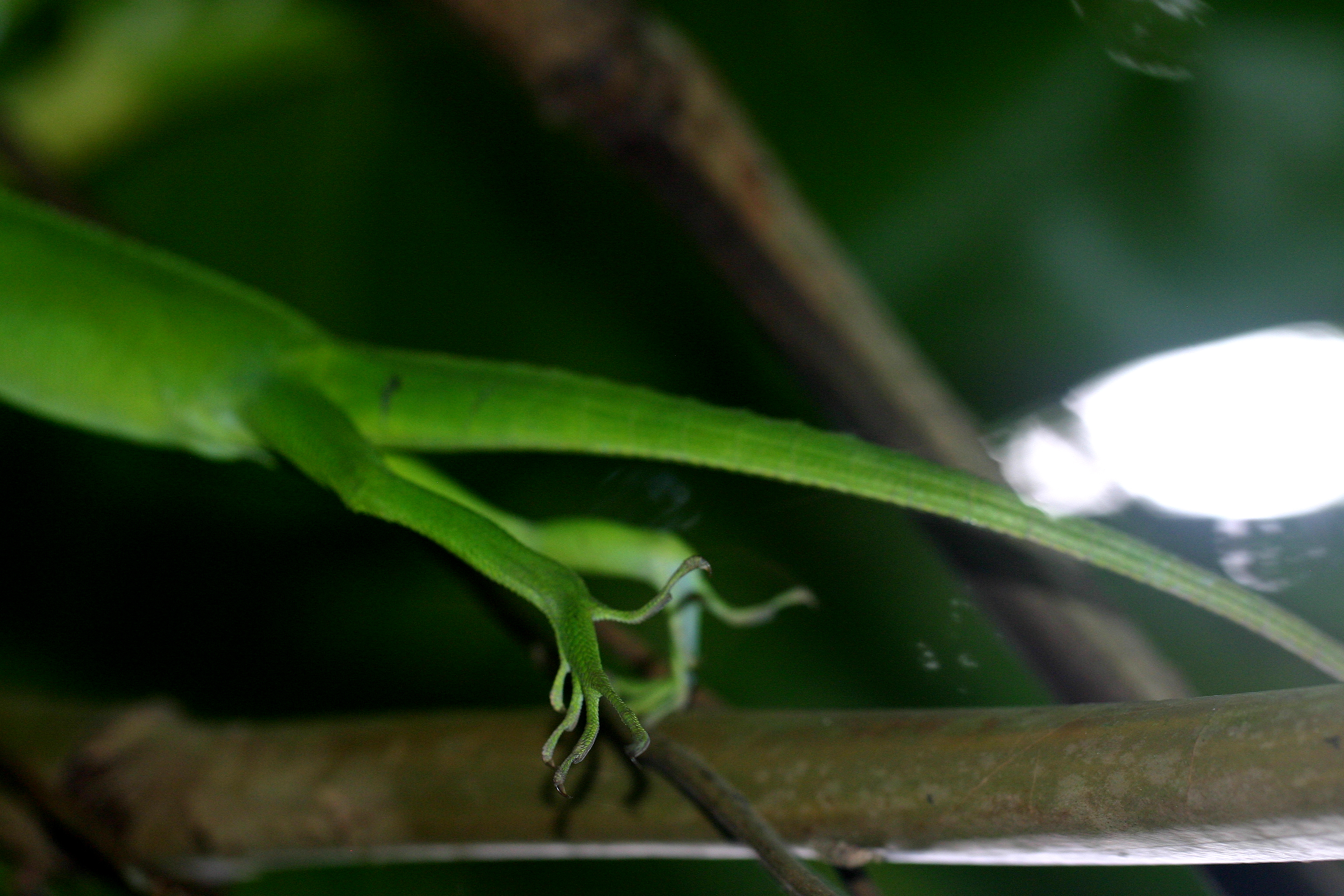
The hind legs of Anolis cuvieri, a long-legged crown giant anole

== Trunk-crown ecomorph ==
These are anoles which inhabit the uppermost reaches of the trunks of tall trees as well as the lower canopy; they are generally found several metres off the ground. Trunk-crown anole are usually predominantly green and have relatively large sub-digital toe-pads and short stout legs to aid in arboreal locomotion. These anoles eat small arboreal insects, smaller lizards, and some species have been observed to consume fruits and nectar; they have triangular, flattened heads, possibly to aid in nectar consumption. Trunk-crown anoles often exhibit the most drastic color changing abilities of any species and are capable of entering several darker phases which are used selectively from very dark to convey stress to light brown or grey for thermoregulation. Other anole ecomorphs are able to change color, but with the exception of some crown giants this is usually to a lesser extent. A few examples of trunk-crown anoles are shown below.

| Species | Image | Distribution |
|---|---|---|
| Anolis allisoni | Allison's anole | Cuba |
| Anolis coelestinus | Haitian white-lipped anole | Hispaniola |
| Anolis evermanni | Emerald anole | Puerto Rico |
| Anolis grahami | Graham's anole | Jamaica, introduced to Bermuda |

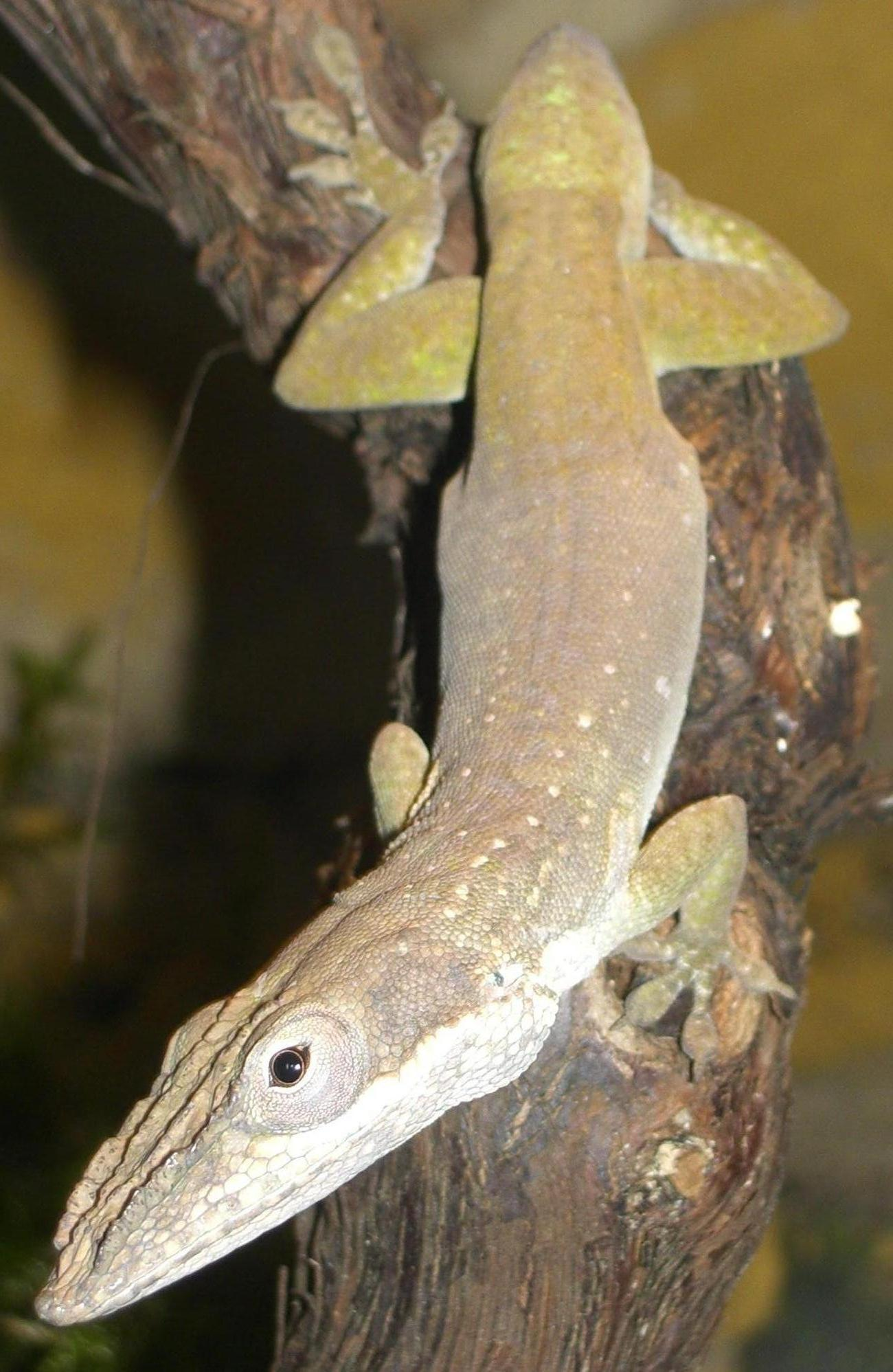
Anolis allisoni showing one of its thermoregulatory darker phases

== Trunk ecomorph ==
Trunk anoles are found only on Cuba and Hispaniola in the Greater Antilles; however, the Hispaniolan species A. distichus is also native to the Bahamas and has introduced populations in Florida. Trunk anoles are mid-sized anoles with short limbs and tails and small, short triangular heads. As their name suggests, trunk anoles are found mainly on the trunks of tall trees and their diet consists primarily of ants.

| Species | Image | Distribution |
|---|---|---|
| Anolis distichus distichus | Bark anole | Hispaniola, introduced to Florida |
| Anolis distichus ignigularis | Bark anole | Hispaniola |

== Trunk-ground ecomorph ==
Trunk-ground anoles characterized by their tendency to perch on the lower trunk of trees or on rocks immediately under the tree trunk, they typically perch with their head facing downwards to locate any insects located on the ground, after spotting food they jump down to capture it and retreat back up into the tree. These anoles will also eat smaller lizards or juveniles of their own species when the opportunity presents itself. Trunk-ground anoles are stocky and usually have relatively large heads and long legs to facilitate jumping. Anoles of this ecomorph are predominantly brown in color but can change to lighter or darker shades of brown based on their mood or body temperature.

| Name | Image | Distribution |
|---|---|---|
| Anolis sagrei | Cuban brown anole | Cuba, Little Cayman and the Bahamas, Introduced to Florida, Texas, Costa Rica, Hawaii, Jamaica, Singapore, St. Maarten, Barbados, Grenada and the Grenadines, Aruba and Taiwan |
| Anolis cybotes | Large-headed anole | The Hispaniolan island bank, introduced to Florida and Suriname |
| Anolis cristatellus | Puerto Rican crested anole | Puerto Rican island bank, introduced to Florida, Dominica, the Dominican Republic and St. Martin |
| Anolis lineatopus | Jamaican gray anole | Jamaica |

== See also ==
- List of amphibians and reptiles of Puerto Rico
- Fauna of Puerto Rico
- List of endemic fauna of Puerto Rico
