= Hispaniolan gracile anole =

There are three species of lizard named Hispaniolan gracile anole:

- Anolis distichus, native to Hispaniola and the Bahamas, and introduced to Florida
- Anolis properus, found in the Dominican Republic
- Anolis ravitergum, found in the Dominican Republic
