= Bark anole =

There are four species of lizard named bark anole:

- Anolis distichus, native to Hispaniola and the Bahamas
- Anolis ortonii, found in Brazil, French Guiana, Suriname, Guyana, Ecuador, Colombia, Peru, and Bolivia
- Anolis properus, native to the Dominican Republic
- Anolis ravitergum, native to the Dominican Republic
