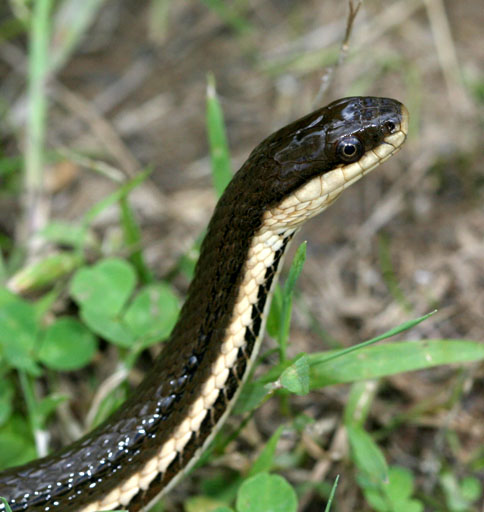

Conservation status
- Least Concern (IUCN 3.1)

Scientific classification
- Kingdom: Animalia
- Phylum: Chordata
- Class: Reptilia
- Order: Squamata
- Suborder: Serpentes
- Family: Colubridae
- Genus: Regina
- Species: R. septemvittata

Binomial name
- Regina septemvittata (Say, 1825)
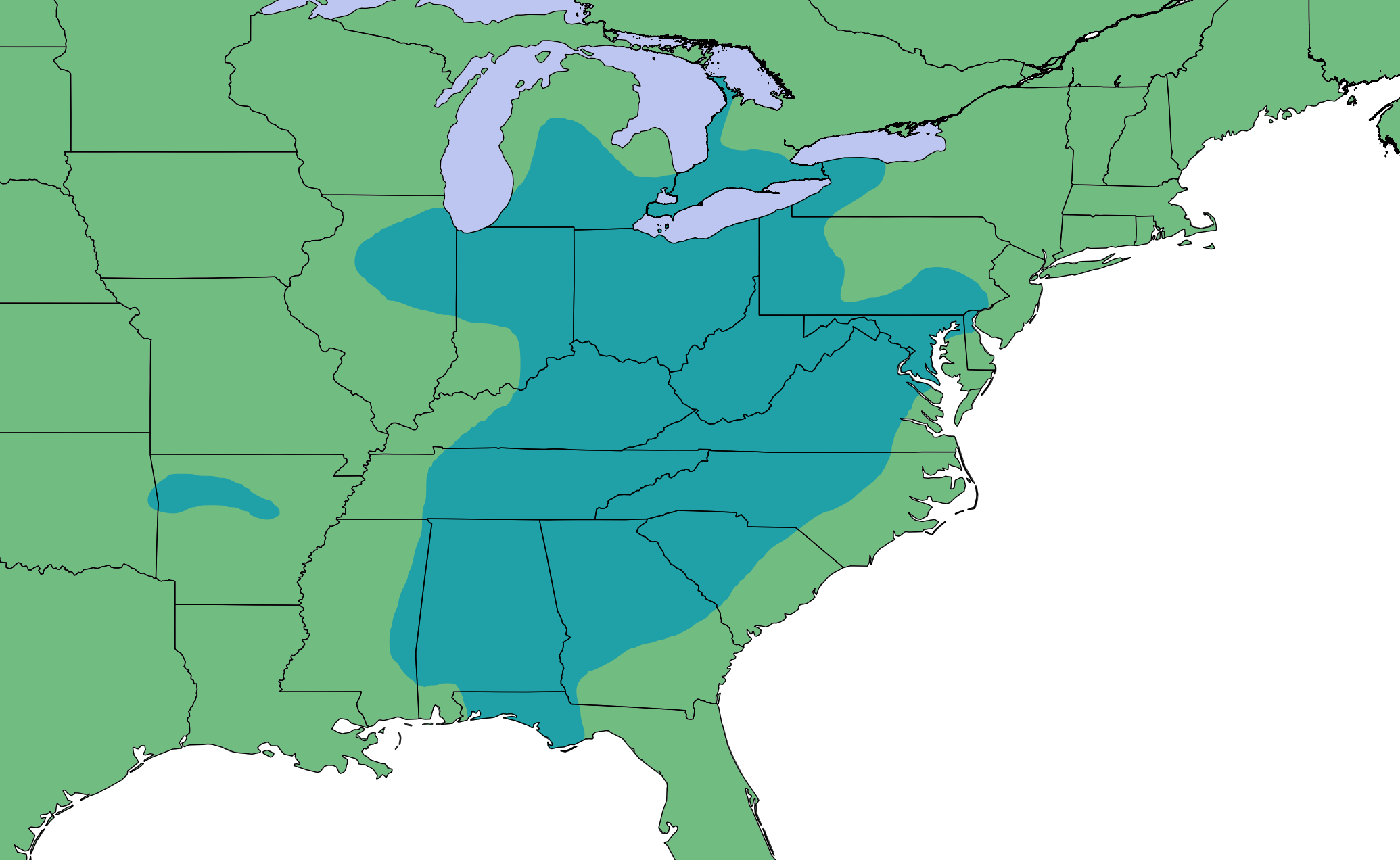

Synonyms
- Coluber septemvittatus Say, 1825; Tropidonotus leberis Holbrook, 1842; Regina leberis — Baird & Girard, 1853; Natrix leberis — Cope, 1892; Tropidonotus septemvittatus — Boulenger, 1893; Natrix septemvittata — Cope, 1895; Regina septemvittata — Conant & Collins, 1991

= Queen snake =

Species of snakes

The queen snake (Regina septemvittata) is a species of nonvenomous semiaquatic snake, a member of the subfamily Natricinae of the family Colubridae. The species is endemic to North America.

== Common names ==
Regina septemvittata is known by many common names, including the following: banded water snake, brown queen snake, diamond-back water snake, leather snake, moon snake, North American seven-banded snake, olive water snake, pale snake, queen water snake, seven-striped water snake, striped water snake, three-striped water snake, willow snake, and yellow-bellied snake.

== Geographic range ==
Regina septemvittata ranges through the temperate region of North America east of the Mississippi River from western New York state to Wisconsin and south to Alabama and northern Florida. There is also an isolated population in Arkansas that was discovered in 1894 and is thought to be an effect of climate change during the Pleiostene era. It is also found in the southwestern parts of Ontario.

Decreases in queen snake populations can be most attributed to a loss of food sources through stream channelization, bank erosion, and water pollution.

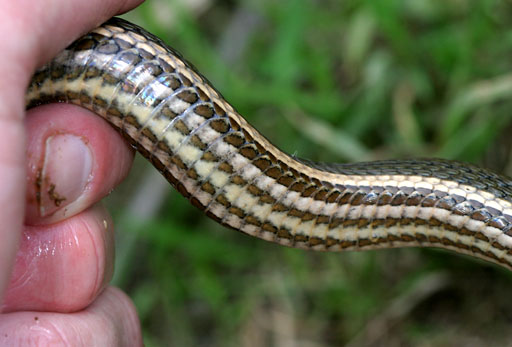
Ventral surface.

== Appearance ==
The queen snake is similar in appearance to a garter snake, genus Thamnophis, so is often confused with that group. The queen snake is olive to gray or dark brown in overall coloration, with peach or yellow stripes that run down its length at the first scale row. There are also four prominent ventral stripes of a darker color, and as no other similar species has stripes running down the length of its belly, this is an important feature in identifying this snake. In the young and juvenile snakes there are three extra stripes: one stripe that runs along the vertebral dorsal scales, and two stripes (one on each side) that run down the length of the body at scale rows five and six. These extra stripes tend to fade as the snake matures, but when young the snake will have a total of seven stripes, three on the back and four on the belly, which gives cause for its taxonomical reference name, Regina (queen) septemvittata (seven-striped). The belly of the snake is a cream to yellow color.

The head of the queen snake is narrow and has nine large plate-like scales on the top, and the chin has several rows of thicker scales. This is a protective adaptation, for the snake's feeding habit of chasing its prey under rocks. The pupil of the eye is round, a feature shared with most other colubrids. There are 19 rows of keeled dorsal scales at midbody, and the anal plate is divided. The sexes are often difficult to distinguish based on external characteristics. Male queen snakes have relatively longer tails than females. Males have from 65 to 89 subcaudal scutes (average 76), with the tail from 23% to 34% of the snake's total length. Females have 54 to 87 subcaudals (average 69), with tails equal to 19% to 27% of total length.

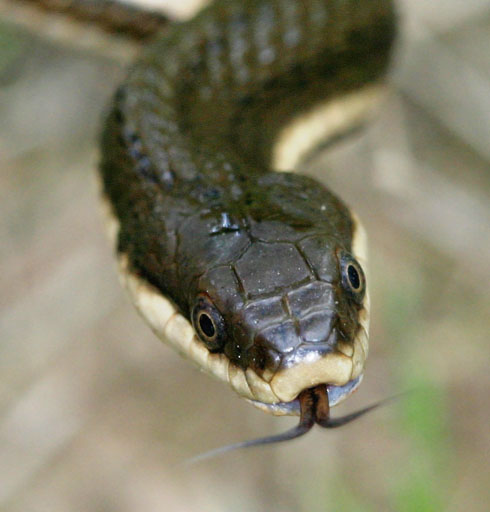
Nine plate-like scales on top of head.

Queen snakes are not large, and they seldom grow to more than 24 inches (61 cm) in total length (including tail). The females are generally slightly larger than the males.

== Reproduction ==
Female queen snakes will be fully sexually mature at three years of age, males at two years. Breeding takes place in the spring and autumn months. Males use tongue-flicking to detect pheromones released by nearby females. If mating was in the autumn, the female can delay giving birth until spring, storing the energy she will need through the months that she will be in a period of brumation. This snake is ovoviviparous, the female giving birth to live young after carrying the eggs within her body. This differs from oviparous and viviparous snakes. Litter size can vary from 5 to 20, and the time for an individual birth is from 1.5 to 2.5 minutes. Time between individual births is 4 minutes to 1 hour, with the average time being 11 minutes. Northern populations tend to have larger clutches on average.

The newly born snakes will be approximately 6 in (15 cm) long and weigh 0.1 ounces (2.8 g). Newborn snakes begin to grow very rapidly and may shed their skin twice in their first week while living on the nutrient rich yolk stores they preserve through this time in their lives. The baby snakes are precocial, meaning they are able to swim and move about and they must fend for themselves independently directly after birth. Juvenile queen snakes range from 17.5 to 23 cm (6.9 to 9.1 in) in length.

== Habitat ==
The habitat requirements for the queen snake are very specific, and this snake is never found in areas that lack clean running streams and watersheds with stony and rocky bottoms. The water temperature must be a minimum of 50 °F (10 °C) during the snake's active months. This is in a large part due to the snake's dietary requirements. They subsist almost entirely on fresh water crayfish. It preys almost exclusively on newly-molted crayfish, which are not able to defend themselves effectively with their pincers. One study indicates that crayfish make up over 90% of the snake's diet. There is some evidence that these snakes may be sensitive to a chemical called ecdysone produced by molting crayfish, which they most likely sense with their Jacobson's organ. Other sources of food include frogs, tadpoles, newts, salamanders, minnows, snails, and fairy shrimp. The queen snake does not find its food by sight or heat detection, but by smell, flicking its tongue to carry the scent of its prey to chemoreceptors, the vomeronasal organ, within its mouth. In this way it is able to hone in on its prey, even under water.

== Habits ==
The queen snake is in a period of brumation throughout the winter months, and groups of them can be found in "hibernacula", near water. These hibernation dens can be inside old bridge abutments, cracked concrete retaining walls and dams, and in niches of bedrock. During this time, the snakes are lethargic, and their main prey, crayfish, may become the predator, particularly of the young snakes.

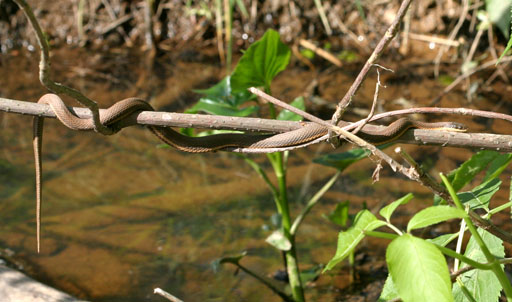
Basking.

It is a diurnal species, but it can be found moving about and hunting at night as well. They are often found by turning over rocks within or near the brooks and streams they inhabit to find prey. They will also come out of the water to bask in the sun, often perching on branches or roots above or near the waters edge. Queen snakes are very alert to any potential danger and will drop into the water when disturbed. They are rather docile snakes, not too likely to bite, but have been seen to mock strike if temperatures were hot enough, approximately 75 degrees Fahrenheit. Their main defenses are thrashing, spinning, and secreting malodorous feces and anal musk, similar to the behaviour of the garter snake in this defense. Queen snakes have been shown to use the sun for celestial orientation in their habitat.

Predators of queen snakes are raccoons, otters, mink, hawks and herons. Large frogs and fish will also eat the young snakes. When approached by predators, queen snakes will flee a distance directly related to their internal temperature. The main threat to the queen snake is habitat loss as waterways are drained, disturbed or polluted. Crayfish, their main food, are sensitive to acidification and accumulation of heavy metals. Thus, as waterways have become polluted and crayfish have died out, the queen snake population has declined throughout its former range. In many areas the queen snake has disappeared or has become in danger of doing so.

== Diet ==
Queen snakes actively forage during the daytime.

Queen snakes are described as extreme dietary specialists, feeding primarily on crayfish. They have been documented favoring crayfish that are freshly molted. Regina septemvittata are especially sensitive to a chemical compound called ecdysone that is produced by crayfish during their molting cycle which help them find that prey easier. It is assumed they use a vomeronasal organ to detect the chemical. One study done offered crayfish during their molting cycle and crayfish not on their molting cycle to queen snakes to see which they preferred. The results showed that the queen snakes would not eat the prey if it was not releasing ecdysone. If none of these prey can be found, queen snakes will resort to eating small fish like minnows.

== Sources ==
- Gibbons, Whit; Dorcas, Michael (2005). Snakes of the Southeast. Athens, Georgia: University of Georgia Press. ISBN 0-8203-2652-6.
- Holman, J. Alan; Harding, James H.; Hensley, Marvin M.; Dudderar, Glenn R. (1989, revised 1998). Michigan Snakes: A Field Guide and Pocket Reference. East Lansing: Michigan State University Cooperative Extension Service. E-2000. 76 pp. ISBN 978-1565250048, ISBN 978-1565250055.
- Smith, Kim (1999). COSEWIC Status Report on the QUEEN SNAKE, Regina septemvittata. Committee on the Status of Endangered Wildlife in Canada. 27 pp.
