= James Duncan Graham =

American army officer, surveyor and engineer

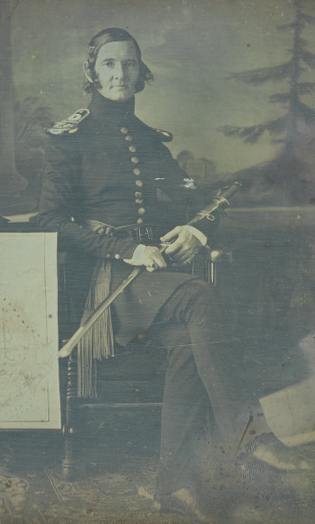
- James Duncan Graham c. 1845
- Born: April 1, 1799; Prince William County, Virginia
- Died: December 28, 1865 (aged 66); Boston, Massachusetts
- Burial place: Congressional Cemetery in Washington, D.C.
- Military career
- Allegiance: United States of America
- Branch: United States Army
- Service years: 1817–1865
- Rank: Colonel
- Conflicts: American Civil War

James Duncan Graham (April 1, 1799 – December 28, 1865) was an early member and founder of the Corps of Topographical Engineers who engaged in many topographical exercises. A topographical engineer, he directed the re-survey of the Mason–Dixon line, and served on the boundary commissions between the United States and Canada and between the United States and Mexico. He also supervised harbor improvements on the Great Lakes, and documented the lunar tide there.

== Early and personal life ==
James Duncan Graham was born on April 1, 1799, in Prince William County, Virginia, to parents William and Mary Campbell Graham. He attended the United States Military Academy from June 19, 1813, to July 17, 1817, when he graduated, and was promoted to third lieutenant in the artillery corps. He worked as an adjunct at the academy from October 12, 1817, to February 10, 1819, during which he was promoted to second lieutenant. In 1828, he married Charlotte Meade (July 9, 1803 - June 13, 1843), the daughter of merchant Richard W. Meade and sister of Civil War general George Meade. Their sons would serve in the military as well, William Montrose Graham eventually becoming a Major General and James D. Graham Jr. a Commander in the U.S. Navy. He married twice, to Charlotte Meade and after her death, to Frances Wickham in 1857.

== Early career (1819–1850) ==
Graham was on Stephen Harriman Long's exploration of areas acquired in the Louisiana Purchase, from 1819 to 1821. He was on topographical duty from January 14, 1822, to January 15, 1829; and then on surveys in Vermont during 1829. Graham then worked on railroad surveys on the Winchester and Potomac Railroad in Virginia in 1831 and 1832, and later in Alabama, Florida, and Georgia from 1836 until 1837. During the Second Seminole War, Graham served under Major General Thomas Jesup, who commanded American troops in Florida.

Graham then was involved in reconnaissance and surveys for military defenses in Missouri during 1838. He served on a Court of Inquiry at St. Louis, in 1838–1839. He was on tour of inspection of harbor improvements on Lakes Ontario and Champlain in 1839. Graham was astronomer for the United States, working for the joint demarcation of the boundary between the United States and the Republic of Texas, in 1839–1840. He served as commissioner for the Survey and Exploration of the Northeast Boundary of the United States from 1840 to 1843. In 1840, he was elected to the American Philosophical Society.

Graham next was head of the Scientific Corps and principal astronomer for the joint demarcation of the boundary between the United States and Canada, under the Treaty of Washington, from 1843 until 1847. That year, he was made a brevet lieutenant-colonel, for "Valuable and Highly Distinguished Services, particularly on the Boundary Line between the United States and the Provinces of Canada and New Brunswick". He worked on remaking maps of the Webster–Ashburton Treaty, that had been destroyed by fire, from 1848 to 1850, and 1852 to 1853.

== Later career (1850–1865) ==
Graham was on the survey of the Mason–Dixon line, from 1849 to 1850. During 1850 and 1851, he was the principal astronomer and head of the Scientific Corps for the joint demarcation of the boundary between the United States and Mexico, under the Treaty of Guadalupe Hidalgo. He was then general supervisor of the harbor improvements on Lake Michigan, from April 20, 1854, to December 11, 1856, and of the channel improvement on the St. Clair Flats, from April 25, 1854, to September 1856. Graham was next superintending engineer of the harbor improvements on the North and Northwestern Lakes, December 11, 1856, to April 20, 1864, in which he documented the existence of a lunar tide in around 1859.

Graham served during the American Civil War as superintendent of the United States Lake Survey, from August 30, 1861, to April 20, 1864; then as lighthouse engineer of the 10th and 11th Districts (comprising the Northern Lakes, except Champlain), the 10th District from August 30, 1861, to April 20, 1864, and the 11th District from August 30, 1861, to March 1863. His loyalty to the Union was questioned in 1864, and Graham was briefly under investigation and removed from his post. Graham served as superintending engineer of sea-walls in Boston harbor, and in charge of preservation and repairs of harbor works on the Atlantic Coast from Maine to the Chesapeake from August 1, 1864, to December 28, 1865. He died in Boston on December 28, 1865, and is buried in Congressional Cemetery in Washington, D.C.

== Legacy ==
James Duncan Graham is commemorated in the scientific names of three species of reptiles: Anolis grahami, Regina grahamii, and Salvadora grahamiae. Anolis grahami is a lizard species native to the territory of Bermuda that is named after him, and the it is notable in its vocalization and ability to change color. He is the namesake of Mount Graham, and Graham County, Arizona, is named after the mountain.

== Dates of rank ==
Insignia	Rank	Component	Date	Ref(s)
No Insignia in 1817	Third Lieutenant	Corps of Artillery	July 17, 1817	
	Second Lieutenant	Corps of Artillery	October 14, 1817	
	First Lieutenant	Corps of Artillery	September 8, 1819	
	First Lieutenant	4th Artillery	June 1, 1821	
	Brevet Captain	Staff — Assistant Topographical Engineer	January 15, 1829	
	Brevet Major	Staff — Topographical Engineer	September 14, 1834	
	Major	Corps of Topographical Engineers	July 7, 1838	
	Brevet Lieutenant‑Colonel	Corps of Topographical Engineers	January 1, 1847	
	Lieutenant-Colonel	Corps of Topographical Engineers	August 6, 1861	
	Lieutenant-Colonel	Corps of Engineers	March 3, 1863	
	Colonel	Corps of Engineers	June 1, 1863	

== Sources ==
- Cullum, George (1891). Biographical Register of the Officers and Graduates of the U.S. Military Academy at West Point, N.Y. From Its Establishment In 1802 to 1890 with the Early History of the United States Military Academy. New York: Houghton, Mifflin and Company.

This article incorporates text by unknown available under the CC BY-SA 3.0 license.
