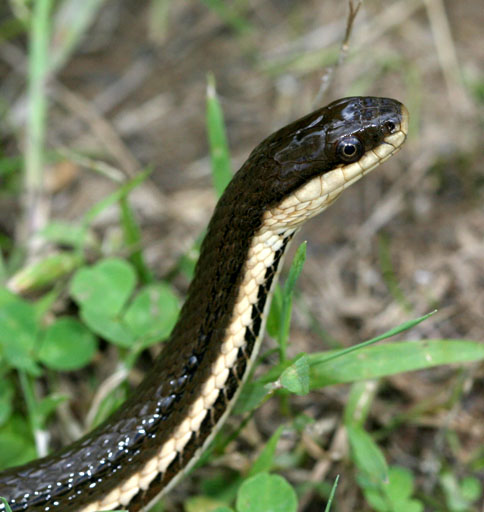
- Regina septemvittata, queen snake

Scientific classification
- Domain: Eukaryota
- Kingdom: Animalia
- Phylum: Chordata
- Class: Reptilia
- Order: Squamata
- Suborder: Serpentes
- Family: Colubridae
- Subfamily: Natricinae
- Genus: Regina; Baird & Girard, 1853

= Regina (snake) =

Genus of snakes

Regina is a genus of semiaquatic natricine colubrid snakes known as crayfish snakes, named after their primary choice of diet. The genus consists of two species which are found in the eastern and central United States.

== Species ==
The following two species are recognized as being valid.

- Regina grahamii Baird & Girard, 1853 – Graham's crayfish snake
- Regina septemvittata (Say, 1825) – queen snake

== Description ==
Both species in the genus Regina have keeled dorsal scales in 19 rows at midbody, and a divided anal plate. The crayfish snakes of the genus Regina have smaller heads than the water snakes of the genus Nerodia.
