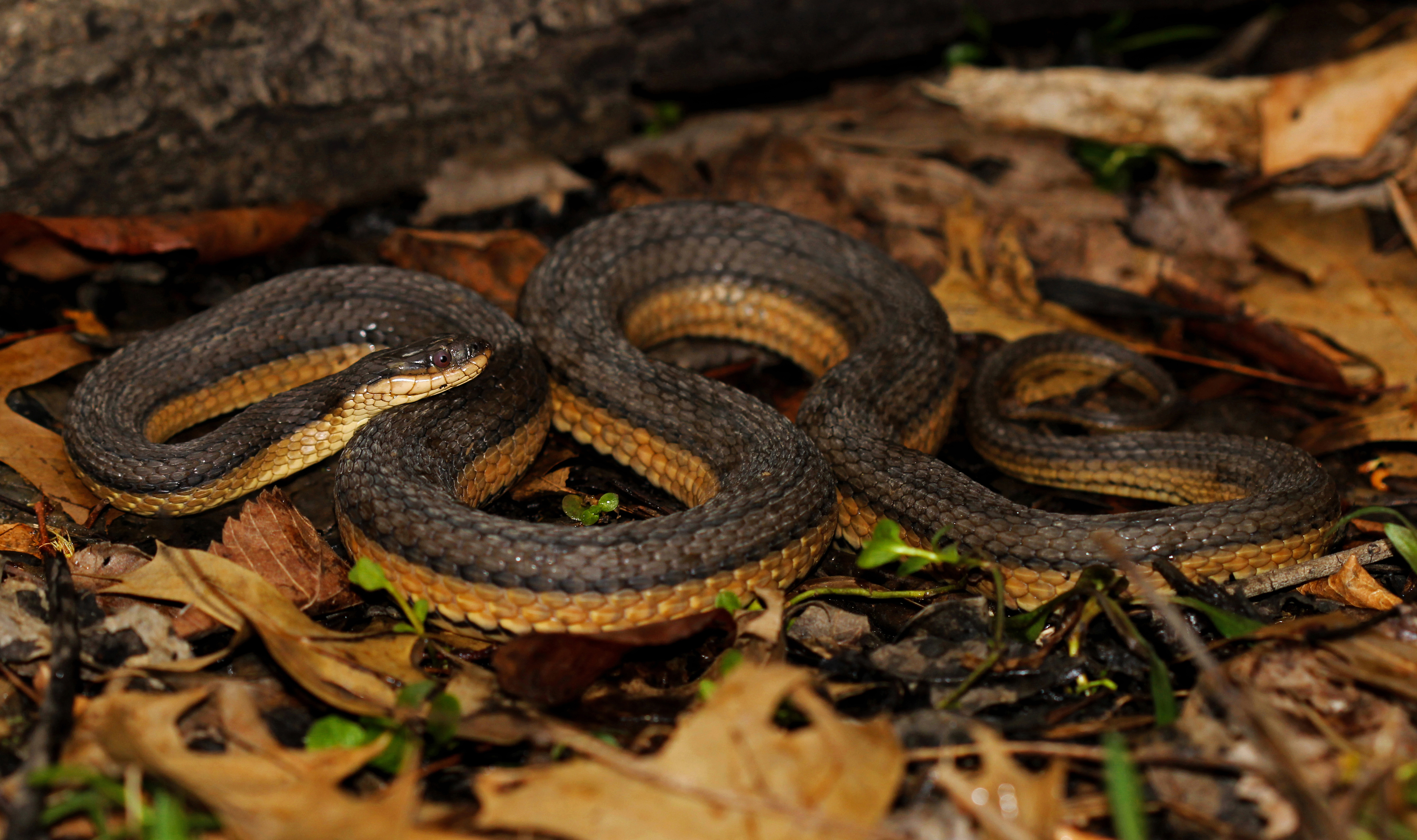

Conservation status
- Least Concern (IUCN 3.1)

Scientific classification
- Kingdom: Animalia
- Phylum: Chordata
- Class: Reptilia
- Order: Squamata
- Suborder: Serpentes
- Family: Colubridae
- Genus: Regina
- Species: R. grahamii

Binomial name
- Regina grahamii Baird & Girard, 1853

Synonyms
- Regina grahamii Baird & Girard, 1853; Tropidonotus grahamii — Günther, 1858; Tropidonotus leberis var. grahamii — Jan, 1865; Natrix grahamii — Cope, 1892; Nerodia grahami — Conant, 1978; Regina grahami — H.M. Smith & Brodie, 1982; Regina grahamii — Conant & Collins, 1991

= Regina grahamii =

Species of snake

Regina grahamii, commonly known as Graham's Crayfish Snake, is a species of nonvenomous semiaquatic snake in the subfamily Natricinae of the family Colubridae. The species is endemic to the central United States.

== Etymology ==
The specific name, grahamii, is in honor of Lt. Col. James Duncan Graham, U.S. Topographical Engineers, who collected the type specimen.

== Common names ==
Additional common names for R. grahamii include Graham's Crayfish Snake, Arkansas water snake, Graham's leather snake, Graham's queen snake, Graham's snake, Graham's water snake, prairie water adder, prairie water snake, and striped moccasin.

== Description ==
R. grahamii is a medium-sized snake, measuring an average of 18–28 inches (46–71 cm) in total length (including tail), but can grow up to almost 4 feet long in some cases. The maximum recorded total length is 47 inches (119 cm).

It is usually a brown or gray color with an occasional faint mid-dorsal stripe. Its lateral stripes are typically cream, white tan, or light yellow and located from the belly up to the fourth scale row. The belly is typically the same color as the lateral stripes and is unmarked, with the exception of a row of dark dots down the center (rare in specimens).

== Subspecies ==
There are no subspecies of Graham's crayfish snake, Regina grahamii, which are recognized as being valid.

== Habitat ==
R. grahamii occurs along the margins of mud-bottom marshes, oxbow lakes, rivers and streams. It particularly likes roadside ditches abundant with crayfish. Graham's crayfish snake typically hides under rocks, logs, and other debris at the waters edge and also spends much time in crayfish burrows.

== Diet ==
Graham's crayfish snake feeds chiefly upon crayfish, especially recently molted crayfish. It is also reported to eat fish and amphibians.

== Temperament and defense ==
The primary defenses for this species, Regina grahamii, are camouflage and nocturnal behavior. When alarmed, especially while basking, it will make a quick escape into the water and hide. This species is relatively docile, but it may flatten out and musk if captured.

== Reproduction ==
Adult females of R. grahamii bear live young in broods of 10–15. Each newborn is about 8 inches (about 20 cm) in total length (including tail).

== In captivity ==
R. grahamii is difficult to keep in captivity, usually refusing all food and developing skin lesions easily. Only experienced snake owners should attempt to raise this species.

== Geographic range ==
R. grahamii is found in Arkansas, Illinois, Iowa, Kansas, Louisiana, Mississippi, Missouri, Nebraska, Oklahoma, and Texas.
