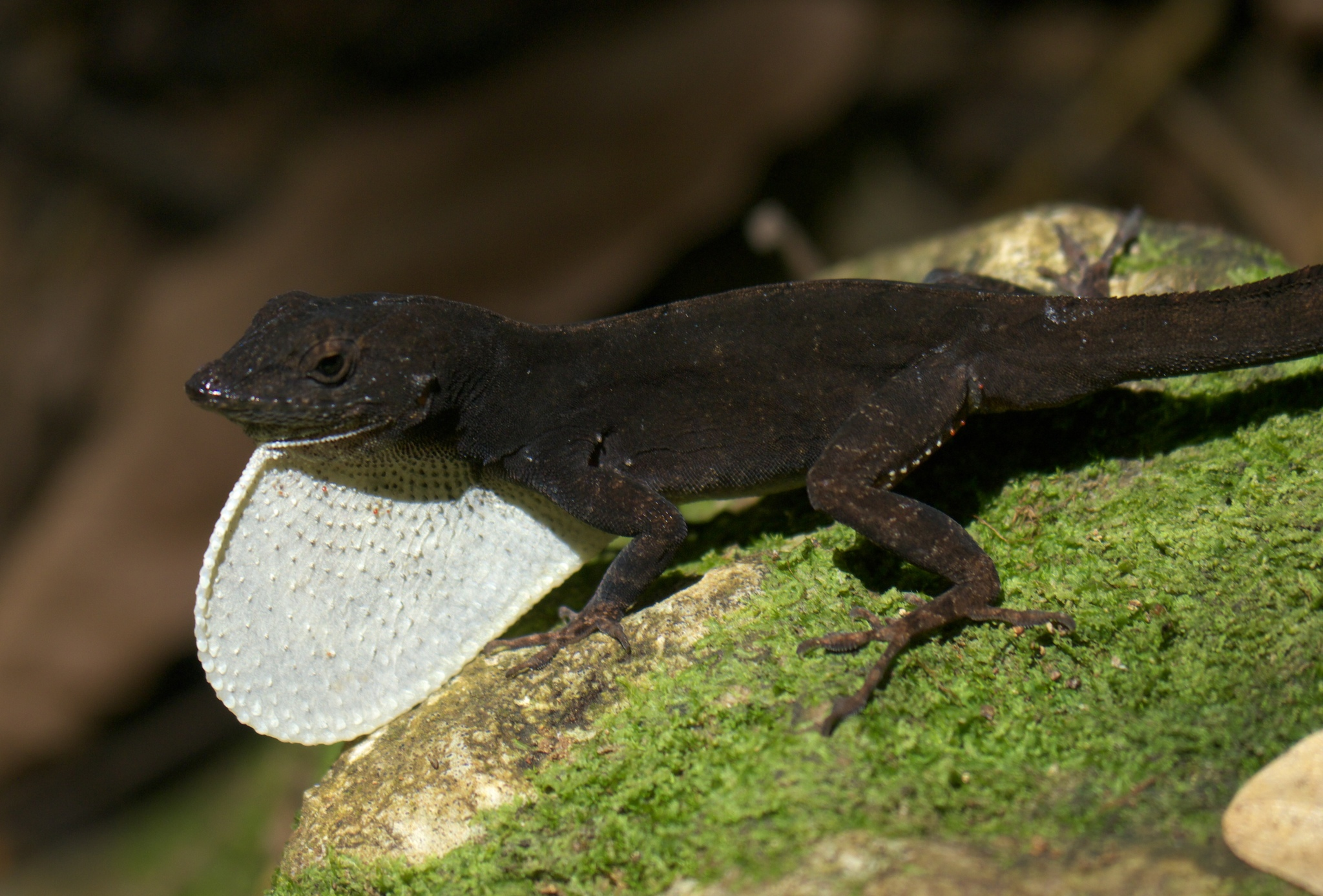

Conservation status
- Least Concern (IUCN 3.1)

Scientific classification
- Kingdom: Animalia
- Phylum: Chordata
- Class: Reptilia
- Order: Squamata
- Suborder: Iguania
- Family: Dactyloidae
- Genus: Anolis
- Species: A. homolechis

Binomial name
- Anolis homolechis (Cope, 1864)

= Anolis homolechis =

Species of lizard

Anolis homolechis, the Habana anole or Cuban white-fanned anole, is a species of lizard in the family Dactyloidae that is found in Cuba.

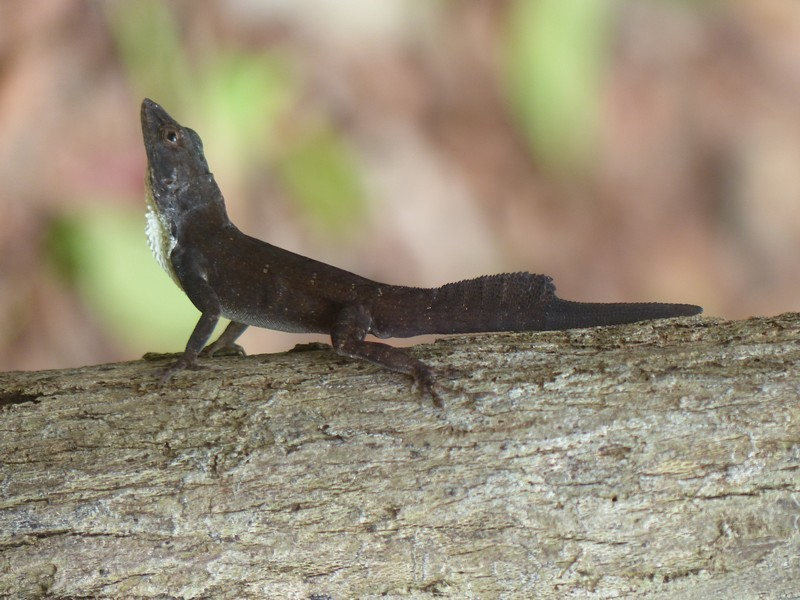
Habana anole, showing the tail crest.

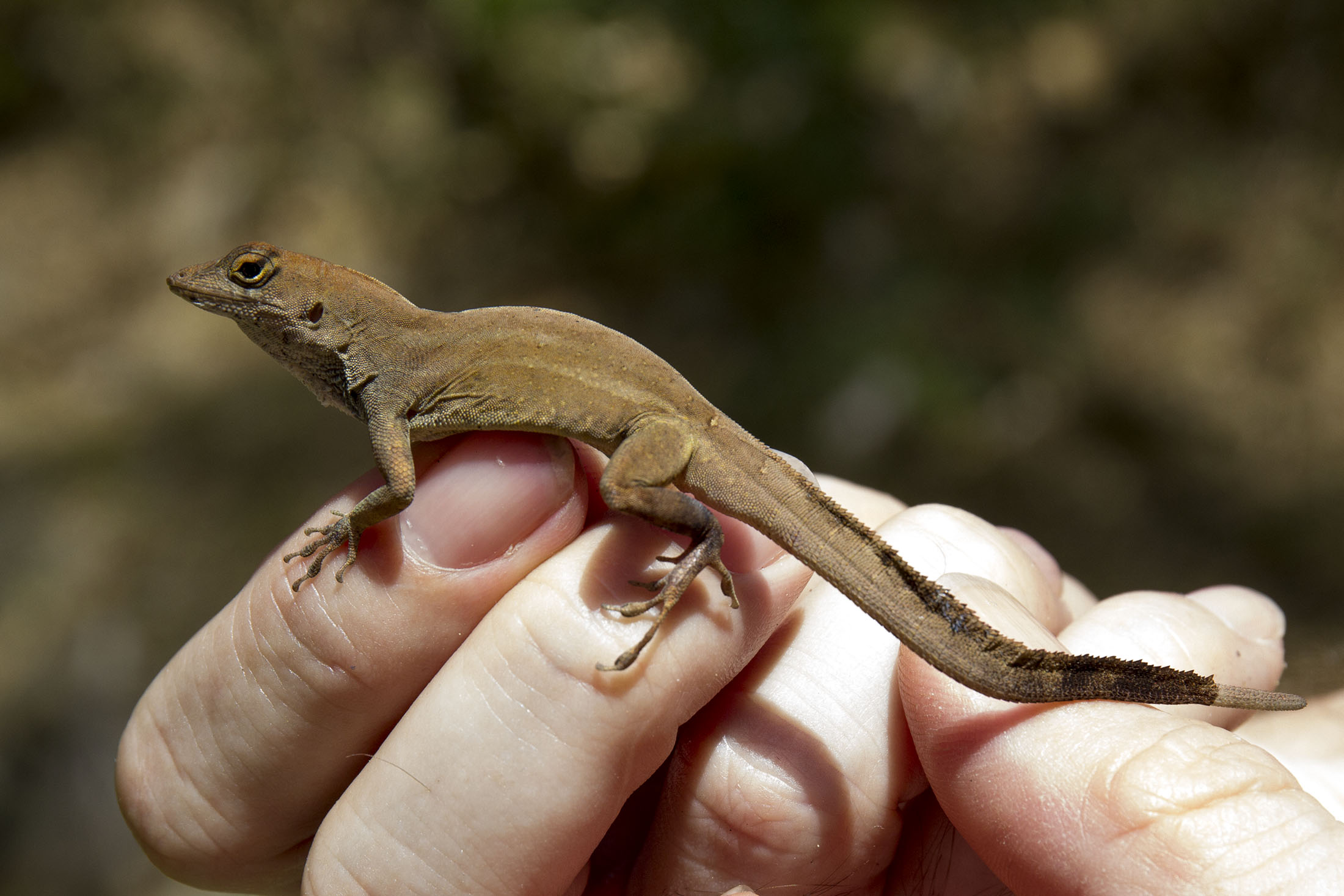
In hand.
