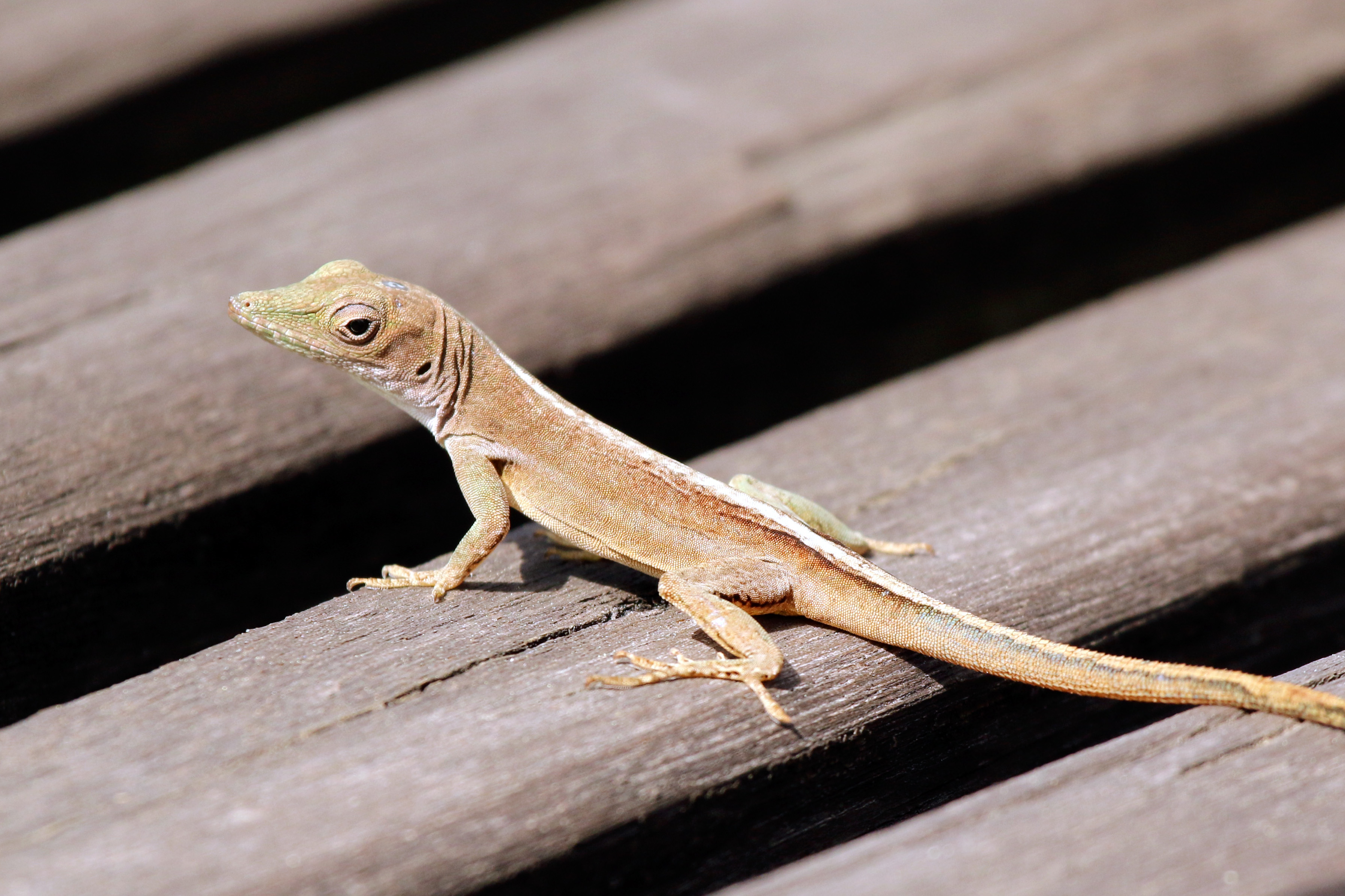

Conservation status
- Least Concern (IUCN 3.1)

Scientific classification
- Kingdom: Animalia
- Phylum: Chordata
- Class: Reptilia
- Order: Squamata
- Suborder: Iguania
- Family: Dactyloidae
- Genus: Anolis
- Species: A. lineatopus

Binomial name
- Anolis lineatopus Gray, 1840

Synonyms
- Norops lineatopus (Gray, 1840)

= Anolis lineatopus =

Species of lizard

The Jamaican gray anole or stripefoot anole (Anolis lineatopus) is a species of lizard endemic to the island of Jamaica. The species is of a similar niche in Jamaica to a related species called Anolis grahami, leading to them often being directly competitive with each other.
