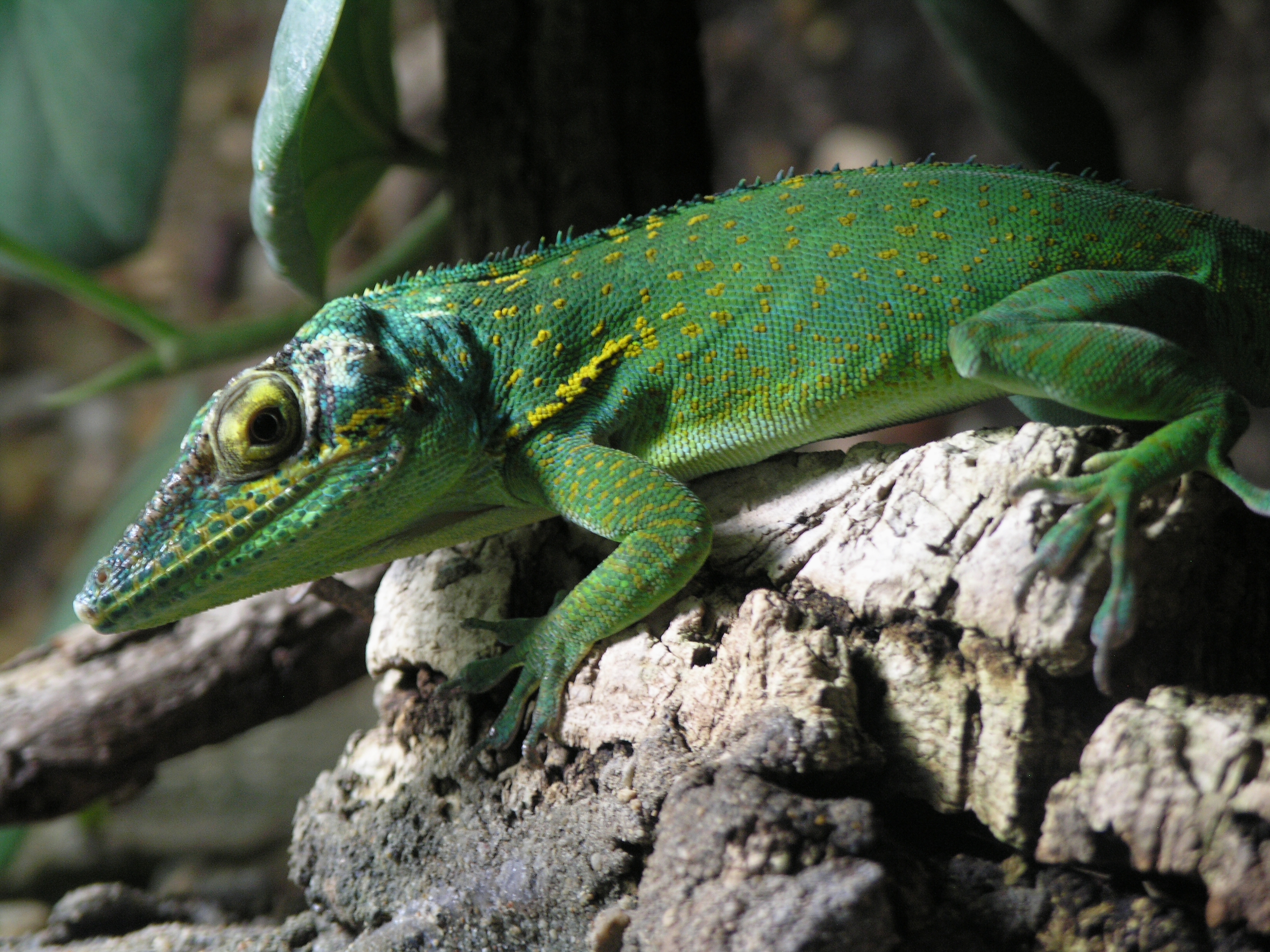

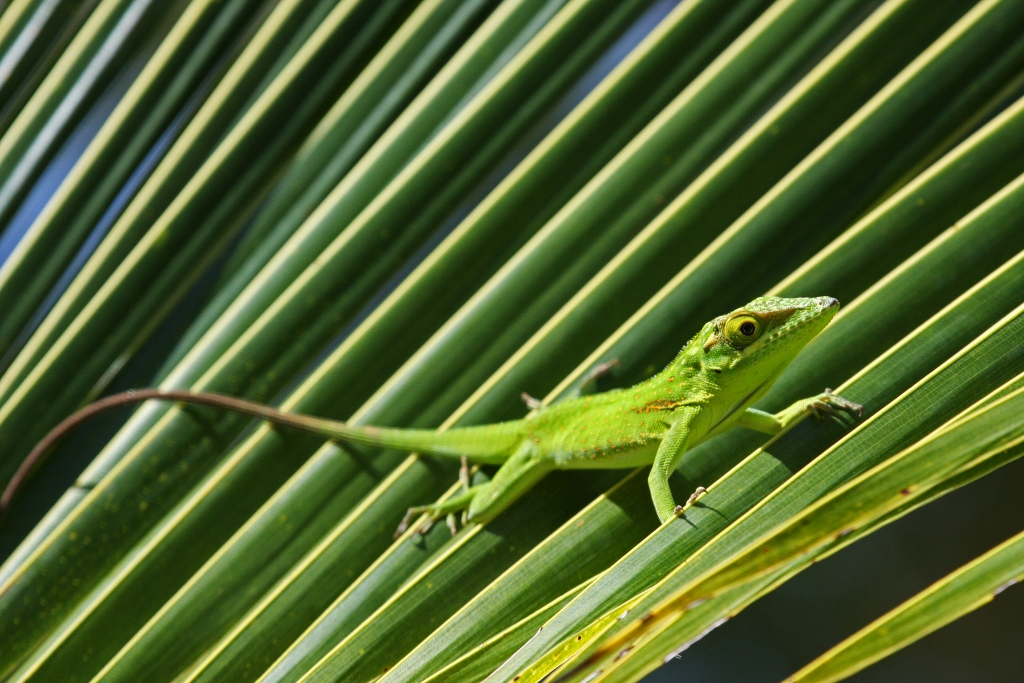

Conservation status
- Near Threatened (IUCN 3.1)

Scientific classification
- Kingdom: Animalia
- Phylum: Chordata
- Class: Reptilia
- Order: Squamata
- Suborder: Iguania
- Family: Dactyloidae
- Genus: Anolis
- Species: A. baracoae

Binomial name
- Anolis baracoae Schwartz, 1964

= Anolis baracoae =

Species of lizard

Anolis baracoae, the Baracoa giant anole or Baracoa anole, is a species of lizard in the family Dactyloidae. The species is found in Cuba.

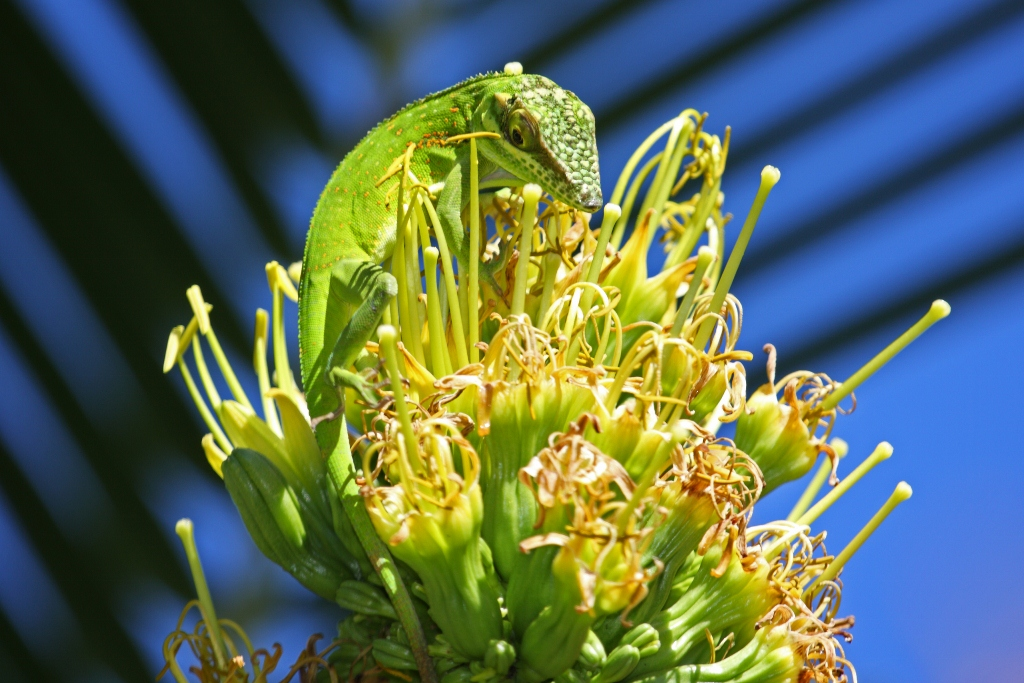
On flower
