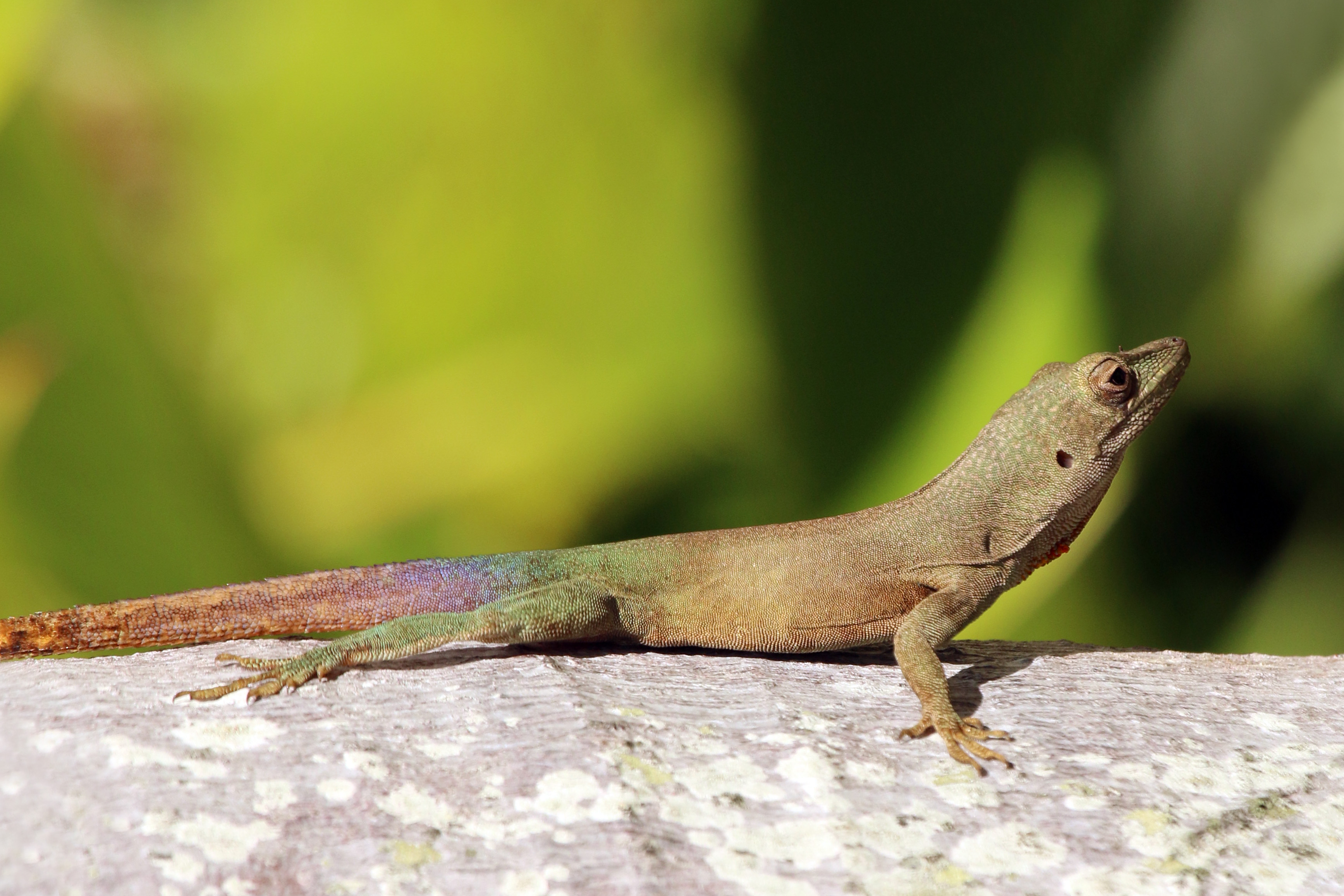

Conservation status
- Least Concern (IUCN 3.1)

Scientific classification
- Kingdom: Animalia
- Phylum: Chordata
- Class: Reptilia
- Order: Squamata
- Suborder: Iguania
- Family: Dactyloidae
- Genus: Anolis
- Species: A. grahami

Binomial name
- Anolis grahami Gray, 1845

Synonyms
- Anolis punctatus Gray, 1840 (non A. punctatus Daudin, 1802); Anolis grahami Gray, 1845 (nomen substitutem); Anolis iodurus Gosse, 1850; Anolis punctatissimus Hallowell, 1856; Norops grahami — Schwartz & Henderson, 1988

= Anolis grahami =

Species of lizard

Anolis grahami, commonly known as the Jamaican turquoise anole and Graham's anole, is a species of lizard in the family Dactyloidae. The species is native to the island of Jamaica, and has also been introduced to the territory of Bermuda. It is one of many different species of anole lizards found in Jamaica. There are two recognized subspecies.

== Etymology ==
The specific name of this species, grahami, was assigned to it in honor of James Duncan Graham, who founded the Corps of Topographical Engineers in the United States Army.

== Description ==
The upper body of Anolis grahami is usually a rich emerald or aquamarine while its trunk and legs are a bright deep blue. It has a bright orange dewlap. The first half of the tail is a deep blue, while the lower half is brilliant violet. Its underside is usually a light blue gray. Occasionally, especially in females and younger individuals, these colors may be somewhat muted, though still quite gaudy. Fully grown males can be exceptionally colorful; occasionally a pure turquoise blue lizard may be observed.

Mature male Anolis grahami can grow to a total length of 16 centimetres (6.3 in) and a snout–vent length (SVL) of 8 cm (3.1 in); females are smaller than males. During confrontations over territory or when threatened males may raise a small dorsal crest atop their heads.

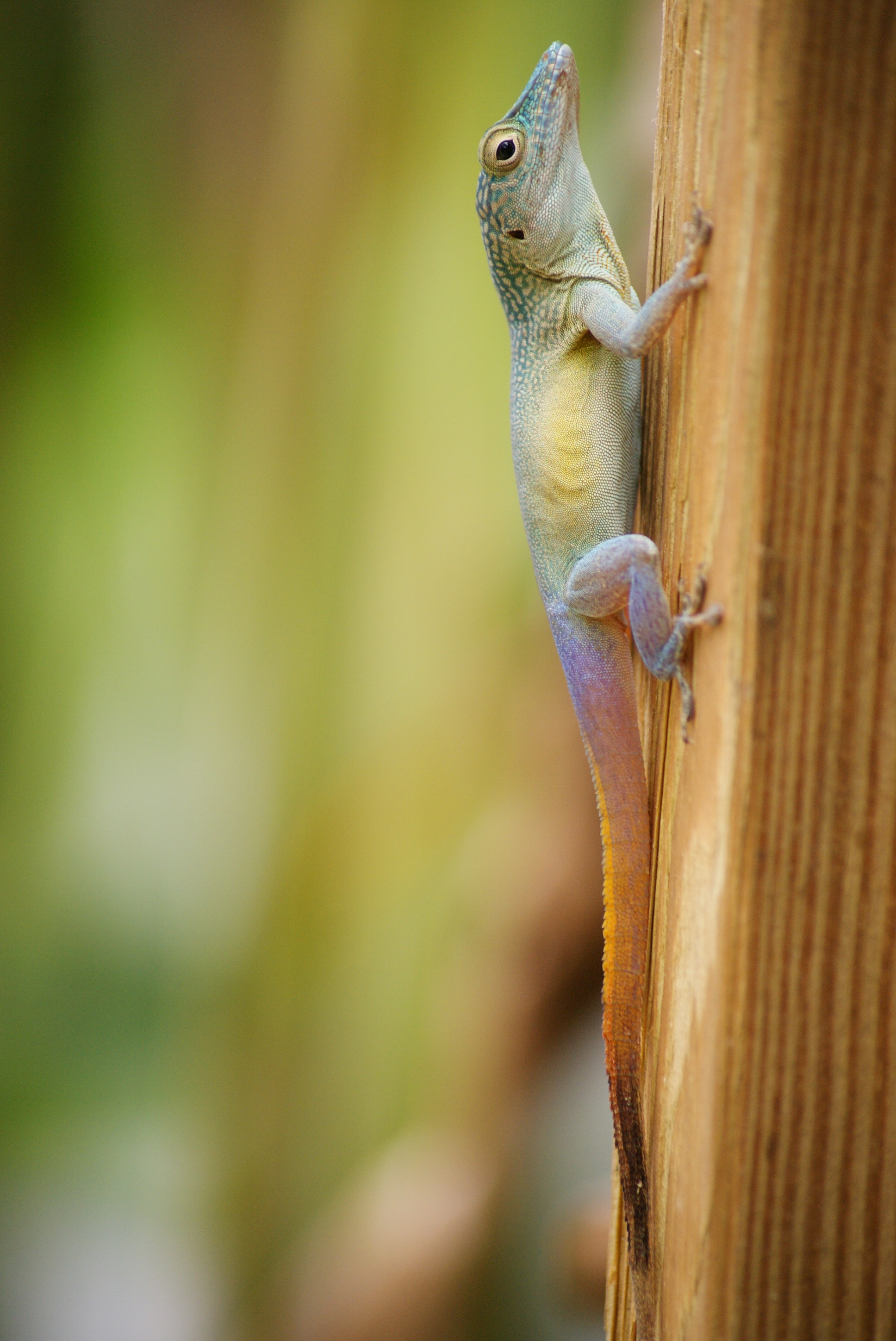
in Jamaica

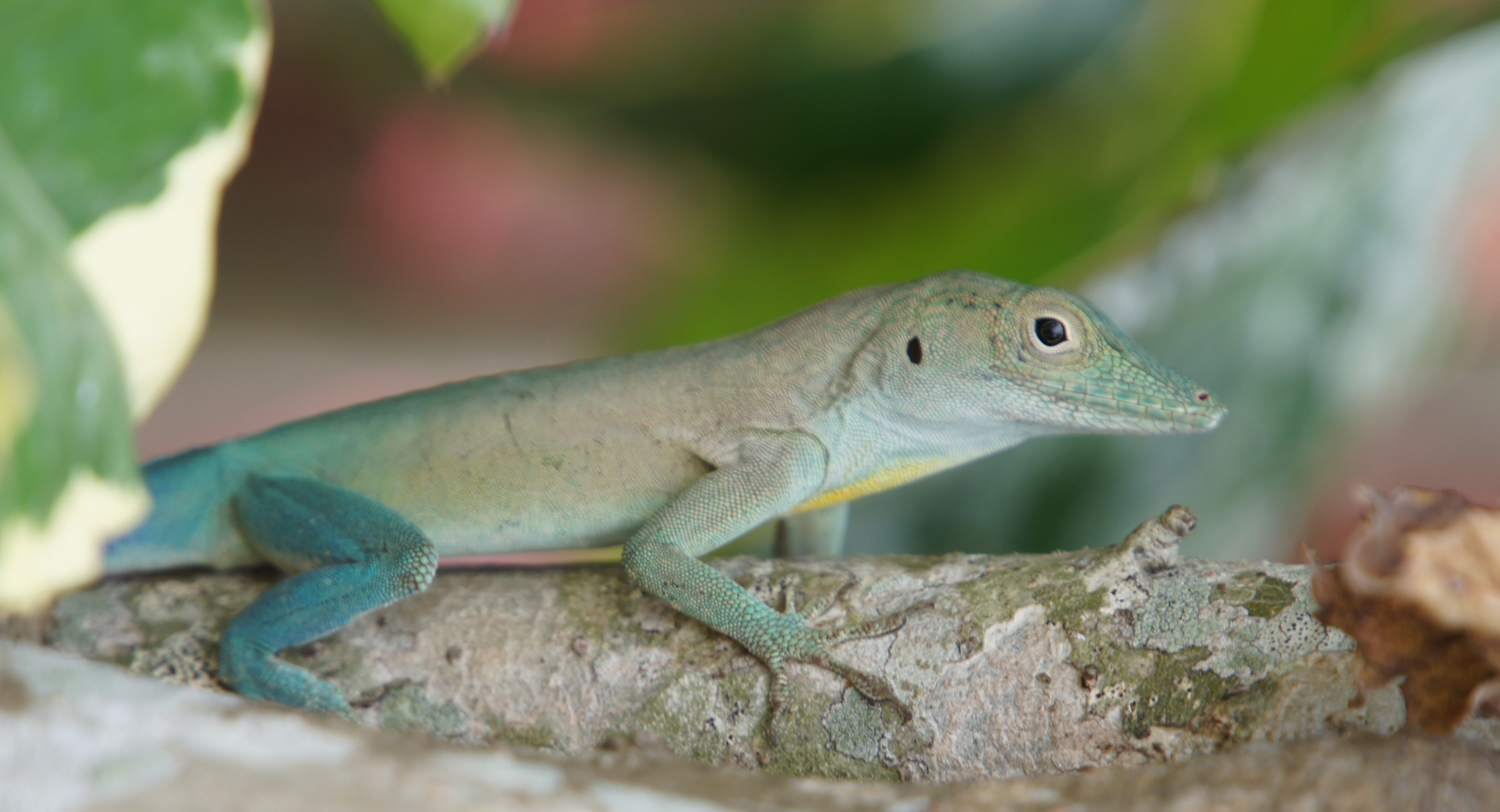
in Bermuda

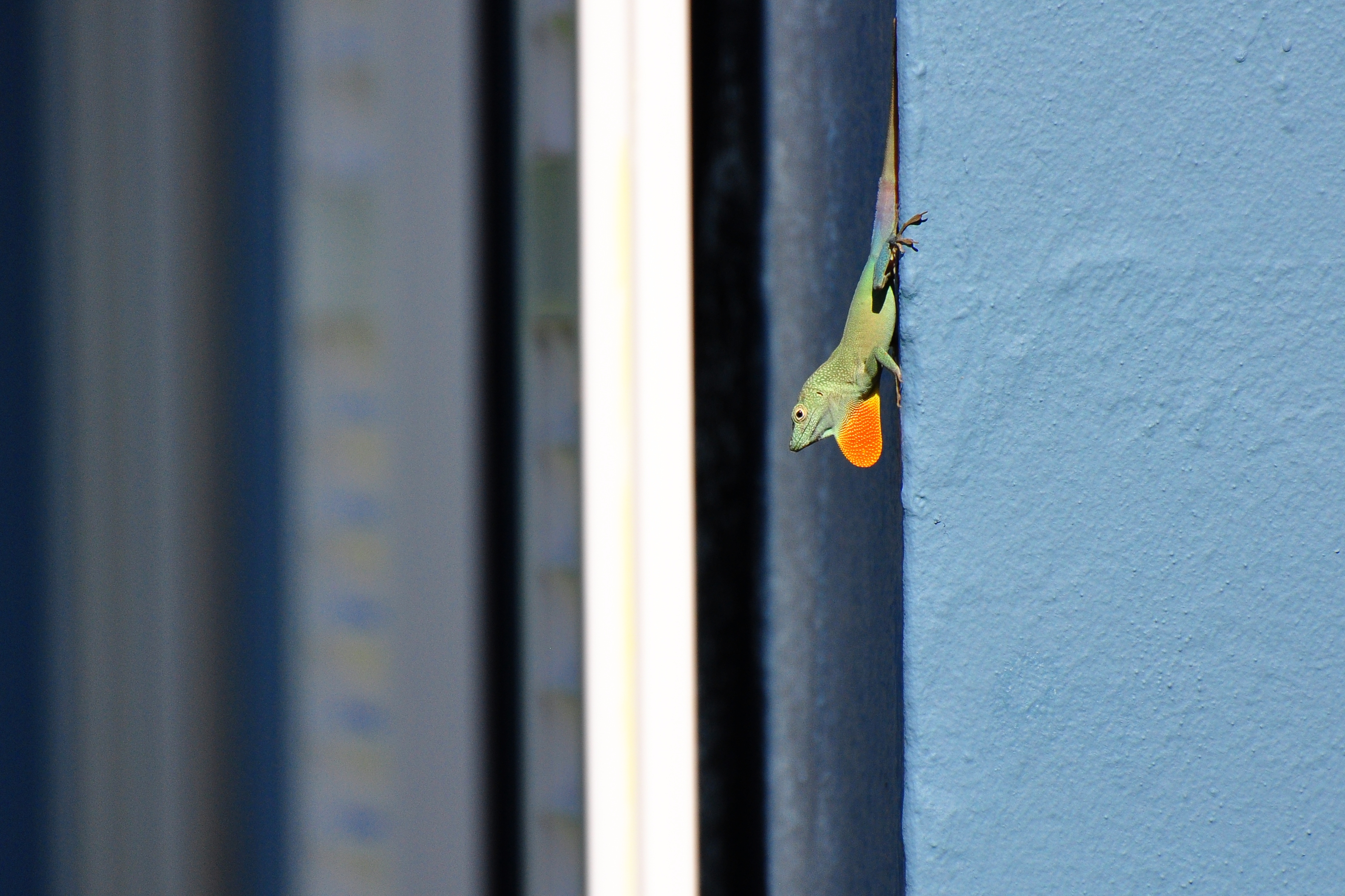
Displaying dewlap

=== Colorization ===
These lizards have a special ability to camouflage and change color when necessary. Under the anole's skin are pigment cells called chromatophores responsible for its usual coloration. Underneath these pigment cells are specialized pigment cells called melanocytes which contain the pigment melanin, in response to changes in the lizards hormones these cells can expand and mask the ordinary pigment cells, resulting in a change to a darker coloration, thus the anole is capable of changing its hue from bright blue, to varying shades of brown or almost completely black when stressed, often the end of the tail, and sometimes the trunk, remains colored during a color change. These lizards also have the ability to change the color of only one half of their bodies.

== Taxonomy ==
Two subspecies are recognized as being valid, including the nominotypical subspecies.

- Anolis grahami aquarum Underwood & E. Williams, 1959 – Portland Parish and St. Thomas Parish, Jamaica
- Anolis grahami grahami Gray, 1845 - Most of northern, western, southern and central Jamaica

The order of the Anolis grahami is Squamata, which is a category that refers to scaled reptiles. Squamata is the most common order of reptile, and it includes species of snakes, lizards, and amphisbaenians. Species that are part of this order can be found all across the world, on every continent except Antarctica. Due to the wide variety of habitats and conditions that they live in, other lizard species in this order display significantly different adaptations and traits from the Anolis grahami.

=== Structure ===
The Anolis grahami have a developed, movable hinge in their skull called the quadratojugal hinge, which is a defining trait of the order Squamata. Members of this order have developed a specific jaw structure that gives them more flexibility that helps them with biting. They also generally have more developed jaw muscles which allows them to have more power in their biting force. The order, Squamata, has been divided into different subcategories, and the Anolis grahami is part of the suborder Iguania.

Iguania is a suborder or infraorder of reptiles that includes 13,000 species of iguanas, chameleons, and New World lizards such as the Anolis grahami. Most of the species classified under this suborder are arboreal, as is the Anolis grahami, but there are also rare cases of some species that are terrestrial. The earliest records of this suborder are prehistoric fossils of the Bharatagama, which lived in the Early Jurassic period around 190 million years ago in the area that is modern day India. Members of this suborder also tend to fleshy, non-prehensile tongues, meaning they cannot use them to grasp or manipulate objects.

=== Taxonomic distribution ===
Anolis grahami is part of the family Dactyloidae, which is a subcategory of Iguania. The Dactyloidae are a group of lizards that can be found living in locations within the range of Southeastern regions of the United States, all the way down to regions of Paraguay. They are commonly referred to as anoles. Members of this group notably have bodies that are green or brown in color, and like the Anolis grahami, many of them have the ability to change colors. Other typical traits of the Dactyloidae that can be seen in the Anolis grahami are the ability to break off their tail when they are trapped, and the presence of a brightly colored dewlap, or flap of skin extending under their necks, that is used for display.

As can be seen by comparing different species of Anolis, they tend to exhibit very different characteristics despite being considered part of the same genus, mainly due to the variety of geographical locations and conditions that they can be found residing in. Because they have been isolated and separated into such drastically different conditions, they have developed in different ways based on what adaptations best suit their context and maximize their chances at survival. For example, Anolis grahami tend to have relatively longer limbs than terrestrial species because it is necessary to be able to climb and walk on branches of trees. Among arboreal species, the length of limbs still will vary based on the diameter of the branches they walk on, as longer limbs will be necessary to walk on wider branches, and vice versa.

== Distribution and habitat ==
=== Jamaica ===
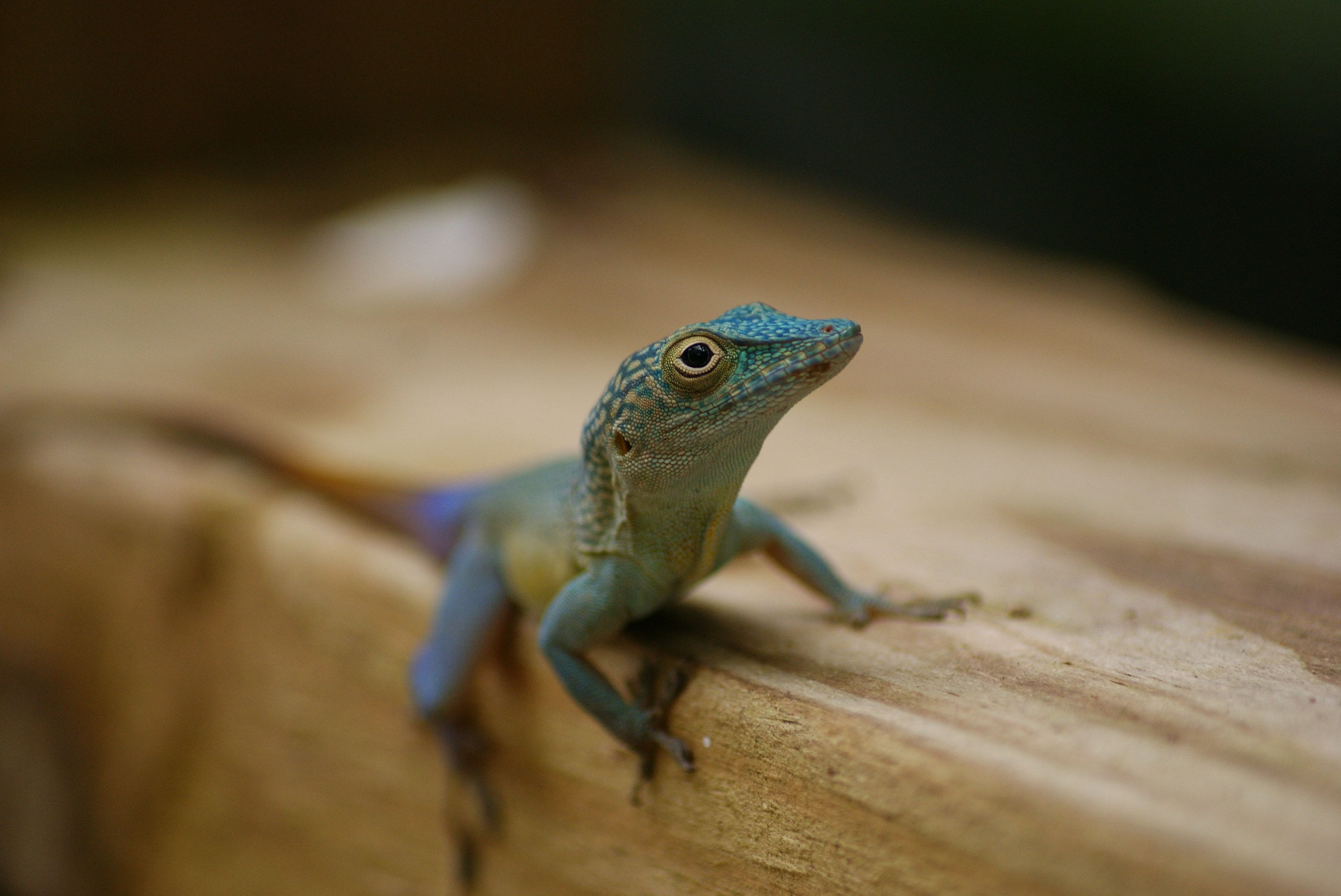
Graham's anole in Jamaica

Anolis grahami is widespread across the island of Jamaica, where it can be found in all fourteen of the Jamaican parishes. The population of A. grahami is most diluted in the southern regions of the parishes of St. Catherine, Clarendon, and Manchester, though some A. grahami may be observed there too. On Jamaica only the endemic Anolis lineatopus is more widely distributed among the indigenous lizards and the lizards may be found in mountainous regions as well as lowlands.

=== Bermuda ===
On Bermuda Anolis grahami is an introduced species and the first of three Anolis species to be introduced to the island. Before the introduction of A. grahami, the Bermuda rock skink (Plestiodon longirostris) was the only lizard found on the island, but the Graham's anole is now the most widespread of the Bermudian lizards. Seventy-one A. grahami were introduced to the island in 1905 by a former agricultural director into a botanical garden with the intention of controlling the fruit fly population. Now it is out-competing the indigenous rock skink. Anolis grahami is listed as least concern by the IUCN.

=== Habitat ===
Anolis grahami is highly arboreal and may be found in the uppermost branches of trees throughout its range. It is also common to see it on the trunks of tall trees, as well in shrubbery, on fence posts, the walls of houses, and other man made objects. Due to its arboreal habits, this lizard can be quite difficult to observe in its natural habitat but is actually usually quite common across its range. This species fills a similar niche to Anolis lineatopus on Jamaica, where the two species are often in direct competition. In areas where the two species occur together A. lineatopus is commonly seen on the trunks and lower branches of trees, which are its preferred habitat, while A. grahami is often found in the treetops; this is similar to the relationship between Anolis sagrei and Anolis carolinensis in North America.

== Anatomy ==
=== Tail ===
The tail of the Anolis grahami during development begins as a segmental structure in the lizard's body, with each segment containing a vertebra. The tails of these lizards tend to grow to be around twice the length of their bodies. The growth of this tail has been characterized both in context as a single, collective unit, and as multiple individual units. It has been determined that the tail of this species grows isometrically, meaning that the muscular contraction reacts to the increasing resistance while staying at the same length, and that each of the segments develops at different speeds. The segments of the tail that are more proximal, meaning closer to the rest of the body, tend to develop at a faster pace, while segments that are more distal grow at a relatively slower pace. This information has the potential to be further studied in order to determine patterns in anatomy and usage amongst different species of anole lizards.

=== Dewlap ===
Dewlaps are a fold of skin extending from the necks of Anolis grahami. The dewlaps of individuals in this species are a bright orange color. There has been a correlation found between dewlap size in males and the power of their biting force. The jaws of the Anolis grahami have developed muscles relative to other species of lizards, and this serves them well when they have to hunt or fight others. Since male Anolis grahami often engage in fights between one another, their biting force is an important factor in their ability to win fights. This is an important distinction and trait to determine how well a male Anolis grahami will be able to survive and reproduce throughout its life. It has been found that male individuals with larger dewlaps have greater biting force than those with smaller dewlaps.

The colorful dewlaps are utilized and displayed by male anole lizards, along with specific head-bobbing movements, in order to repel other male rivals and to attract potential female mates. Thus, the colors of these dewlaps have arisen so that they are more discriminable from the background environment, explaining why they are of such showy colors. It has been shown through experimentation that the lighting in which the lizards are showing off their dewlaps has no effect on the effectiveness and detectability of their displays and behavior. This means that it does not matter how well lit the places where they put on their displays are.

=== Legs ===
Anolis grahami tend to have longer legs relative to other species of lizards, because they are arboreal and need them to be able to grab onto the tree branches. Even among individuals in this species, there were significant differences in their sprinting performance based on the length of their legs. The sprinting speed of Anolis grahami with different leg lengths were recorded on rods of different diameter. The individuals with longer legs were able to reach faster sprinting speeds than those with shorter leg lengths, and those with longer legs performed better as the diameter of the rods increased. The species' leg length is likely a development resulting from adaptation to the faster predators that they experience in their habitats, and so that they can travel more quickly on trees either away from enemies, or towards organisms they are preying on.

== Behavior ==
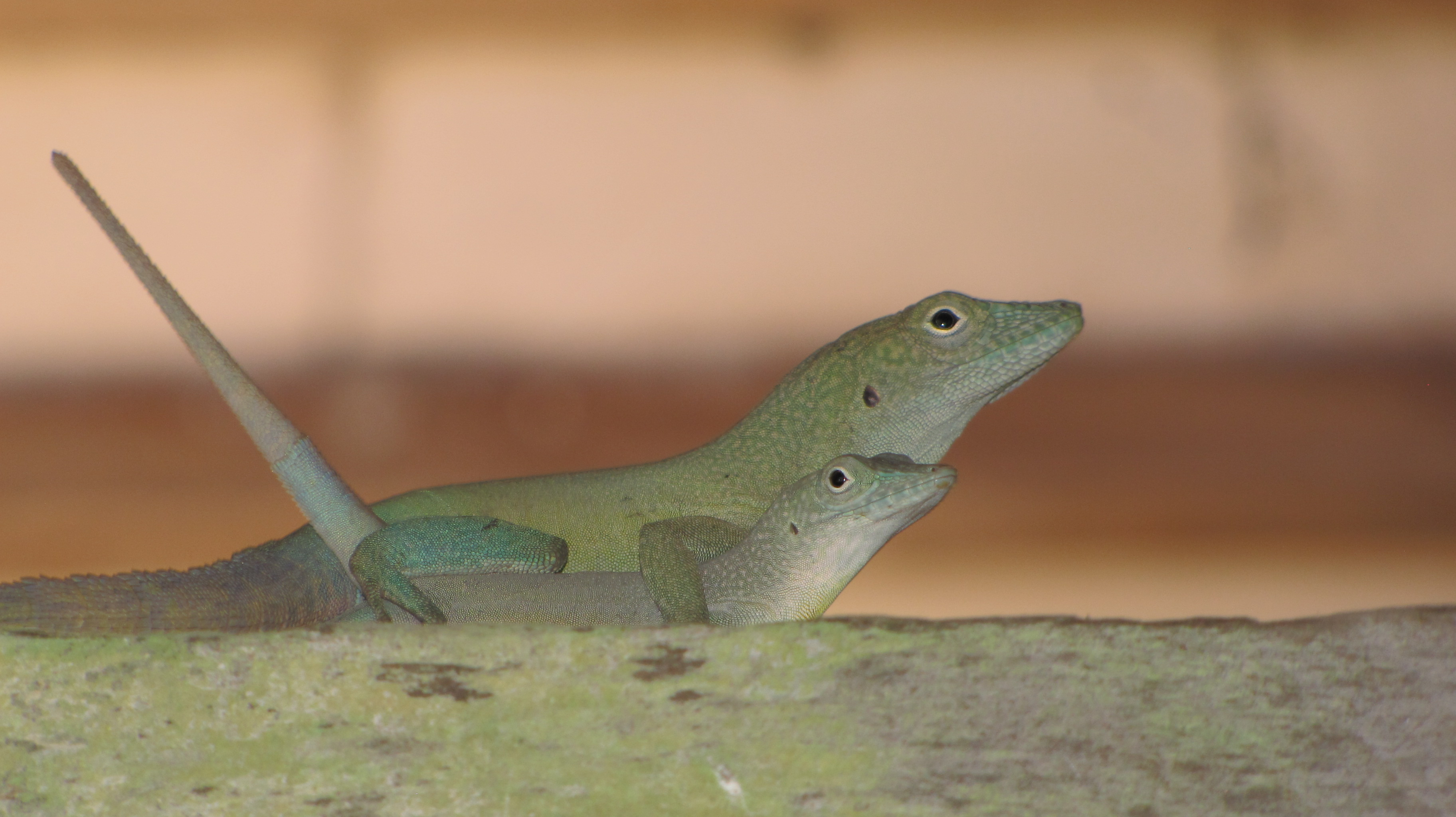
Two lizards mating

Like all Anolis species Graham's anole is highly territorial. When confronted by another male, a male Graham's anole will extend its bright orange dewlap and bob its head and abdomen up and down as if doing push-ups; if the intruding male does not withdraw then a chase will ensue and if one lizard is not chased away then a fight may occur. The victor gains rights to the territory. Their territorial threat display is also used by male lizards to attract females.

=== Feeding ===
Like most anoles these lizards are ambush predators which prefer to sit and wait for prey and then capture it in quick bursts of speed. They will take prey including small arboreal insects such as butterflies or dragonflies. They will also take prey closer to the ground such as cockroaches or houseflies. This anole has been observed presumably feeding on the nectar of blossoms.

=== Vocalization ===
Anolis grahami are notable in their ability to use vocalization in order to communicate between members of the species. This species of lizard has been documented making different types of sounds, each most likely indicating a different meaning or signifying a different message to others in their population. When engaging in fights with predators and other lizards, the Anolis grahami make a squeak-like sound when each time they make a lunging attack move. When making biting attacks and engaging in a mouth hold, they have been observed making multiple squeaking sounds in succession. Other than these noises, the lizards also communicate using two different types of growling noises, and two different types of squealing noises. Scientists have observed, however, that the Anolis grahami do not respond differently to the different types of growls and squeals, so the meaning of each of these sounds is not quite known. There are also no significant relationships found amongst the types of anoles that can vocalize, so the ability is thought to have polyphyletic origins. The sound producing part of the lizard species' body is also not known.

=== Reproduction ===
The reproductive habits of this species are not very well studied. The breeding season is believed to be from April to September. They lay their eggs in secluded places such as crevices inside decomposing logs or inside holes in the trunks of trees. Usually upwards of two small white eggs are laid.

=== Defense ===
Like most small lizards, Graham's anole has a wide range of predators, ranging from birds and cats to larger lizard species, including larger Graham's anoles. When it has sensed oncoming danger, the lizard's first reaction is to flee, usually upwards into the trees. If the lizard is captured or confronted, its first reaction will be to change its color from bright green to brown or black, indicating stress. It will also open its mouth and gape at the attacker while extending its dewlap in an attempt to intimidate its captor. If the lizard is picked up or handled, it may urinate on its captor in an attempt to discourage it. It may also bite, though its teeth are not large enough for it to pose any real danger to humans. Like most lizards, these anoles possess autotomic tails. If the lizard is captured or pursued, the end portion of the tail may break off and continue to move for several minutes, hopefully distracting its attacker and giving the lizard enough time to escape. Given time, the dislocated portion of the tail may be replaced by a stiff, cartilaginous rod.

== Hybridization ==
There has been a case in which a male hybrid resulting from the crossbreeding of a lizard from the species Anolis grahami and one from the species Anolis lineatopus neckeri has been found in the wild. The recorded case of this hybrid lizard occurred in Mandeville, Jamaica. Many of the physical traits of this individual were observed to be intermediate to the two species of its parents, such as scalation, body color, size, and body proportions. However, the behavior of this individual in a natural setting seemed more similar to the Anolis grahami parent. When they were experimentally put into social situations, it did not act like a member of either species. This is an important finding that can be considered moving forward, as this will have an effect on how the genes will interact in other hybrids, and it is a discovery that means that there may be other hybrids that can be discovered and studied in the future.

== Conservation status ==
Graham's anole is rated at "Least Concern" by the IUCN Red List. Since this anole is able to thrive on the island of Jamaica, the population is stable and there are no conservation actions suggested. It has limited threats and is able to subsist in human habitation.
