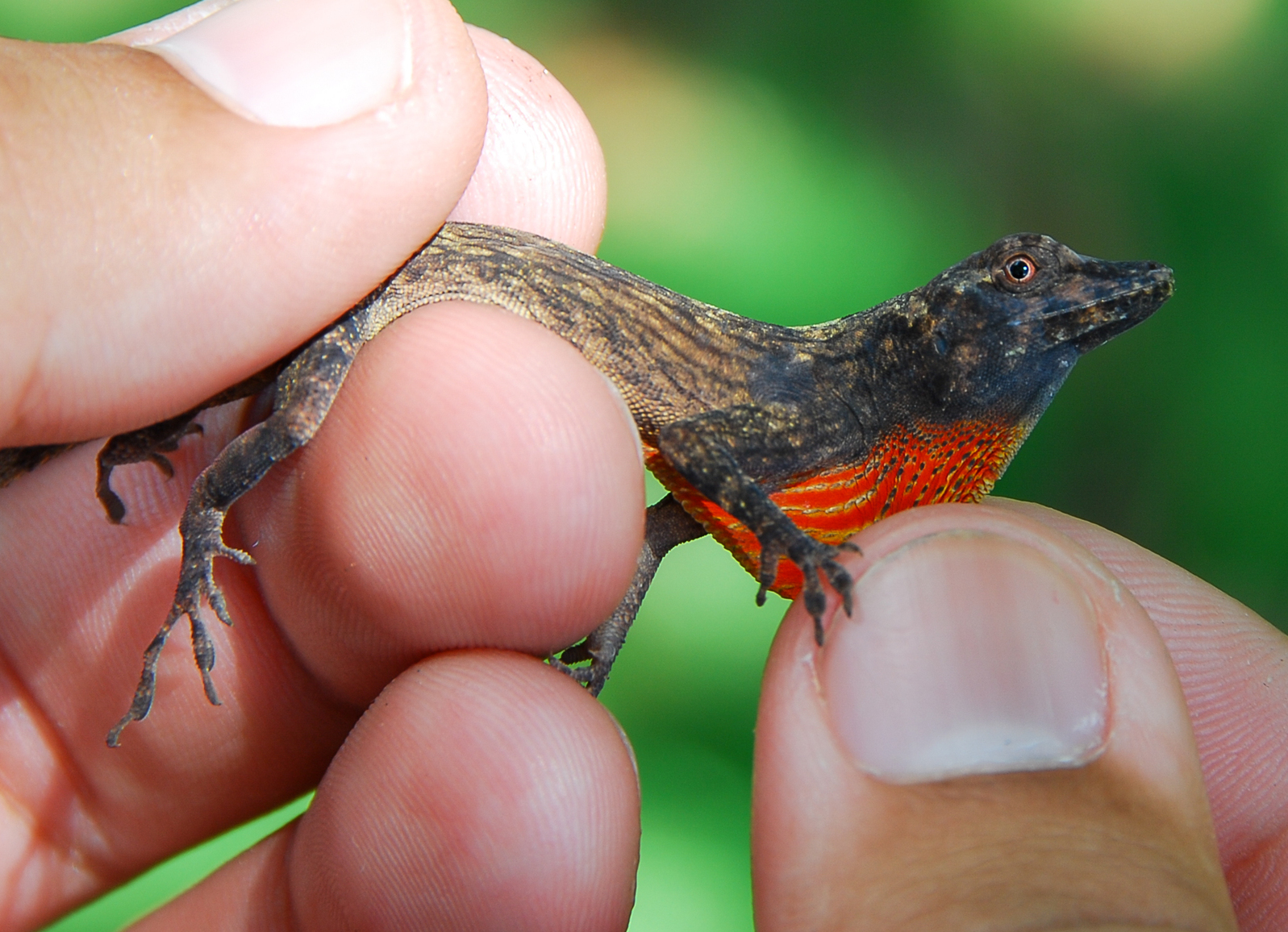
- Male
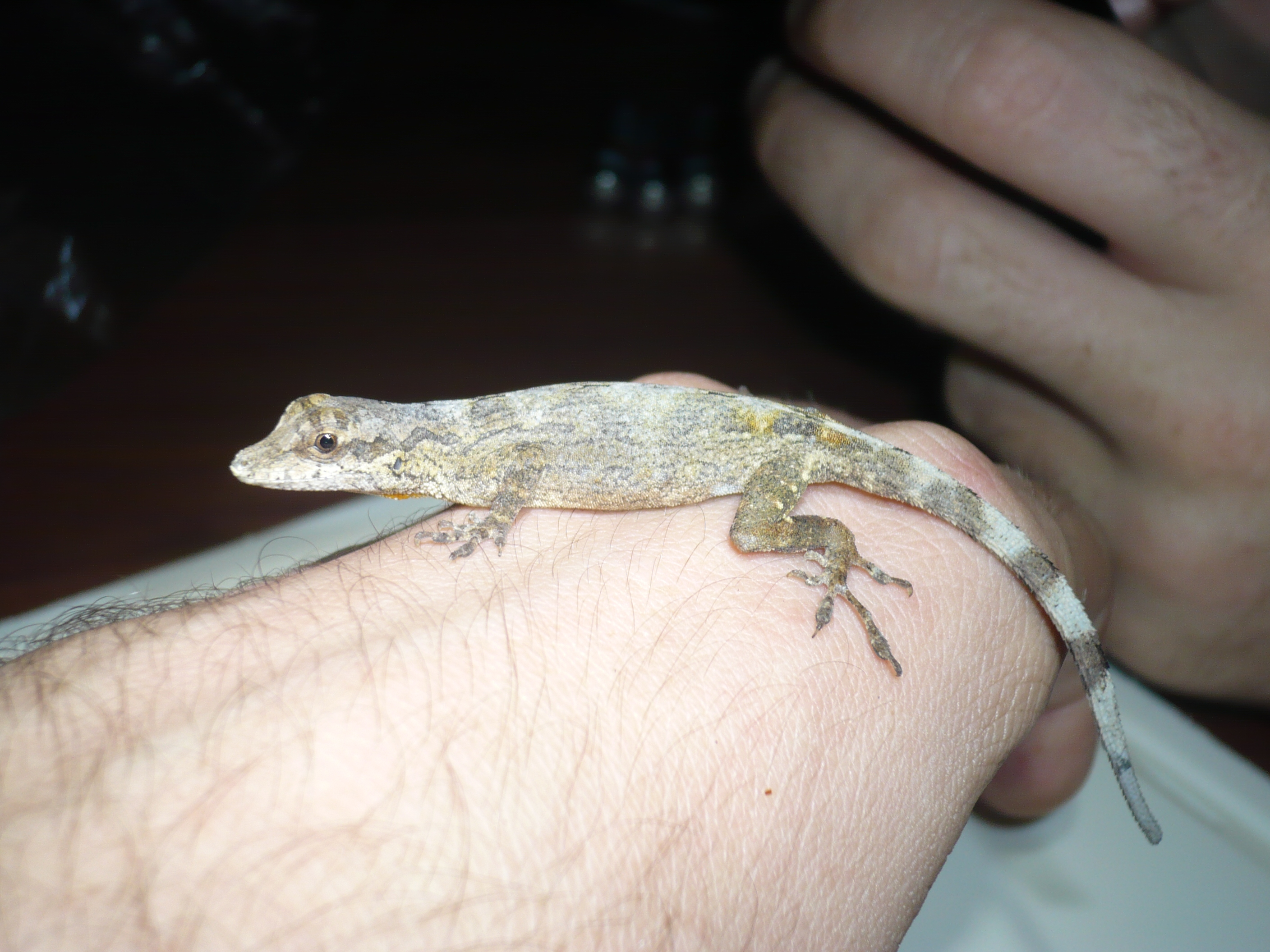
- Female

Conservation status
- Least Concern (IUCN 3.1)

Scientific classification
- Kingdom: Animalia
- Phylum: Chordata
- Class: Reptilia
- Order: Squamata
- Suborder: Iguania
- Family: Anolidae
- Genus: Anolis
- Species: A. ortonii

Binomial name
- Anolis ortonii Cope, 1868

Synonyms
- Norops ortonii (Cope, 1868); Anolis cynocephalus Bocourt, 1870; Anolis bouvieri Bocourt, 1873; Norops bouvieri (Bocourt, 1873)

= Anolis ortonii =

Species of lizard

Anolis ortonii, also known commonly as the bark anole and Orton's anole, is a species of lizard in the family Dactyloidae. The species is native to South America.

== Etymology ==
The specific name ortonii honors American zoologist James Orton.

== Geographic distribution ==
Anolis ortonii is found in northern South America east of the Andes, in Bolivia, Brazil, Colombia, Ecuador, French Guiana, Guyana, Peru, Suriname, and Venezuela.

== Habitat ==
The preferred natural habitat of Anolis ortonii is forest, at elevations from sea level to 1,300 m (4,300 ft), but it has also been found in agricultural land, parks, and yards.

== Behavior ==
Anolis ortonii is terrestrial and arboreal.

== Diet ==
Anolis ortonii preys predominately upon ants, but also upon other small invertebrates.

== Reproduction ==
Anolis ortonii is oviparous.
