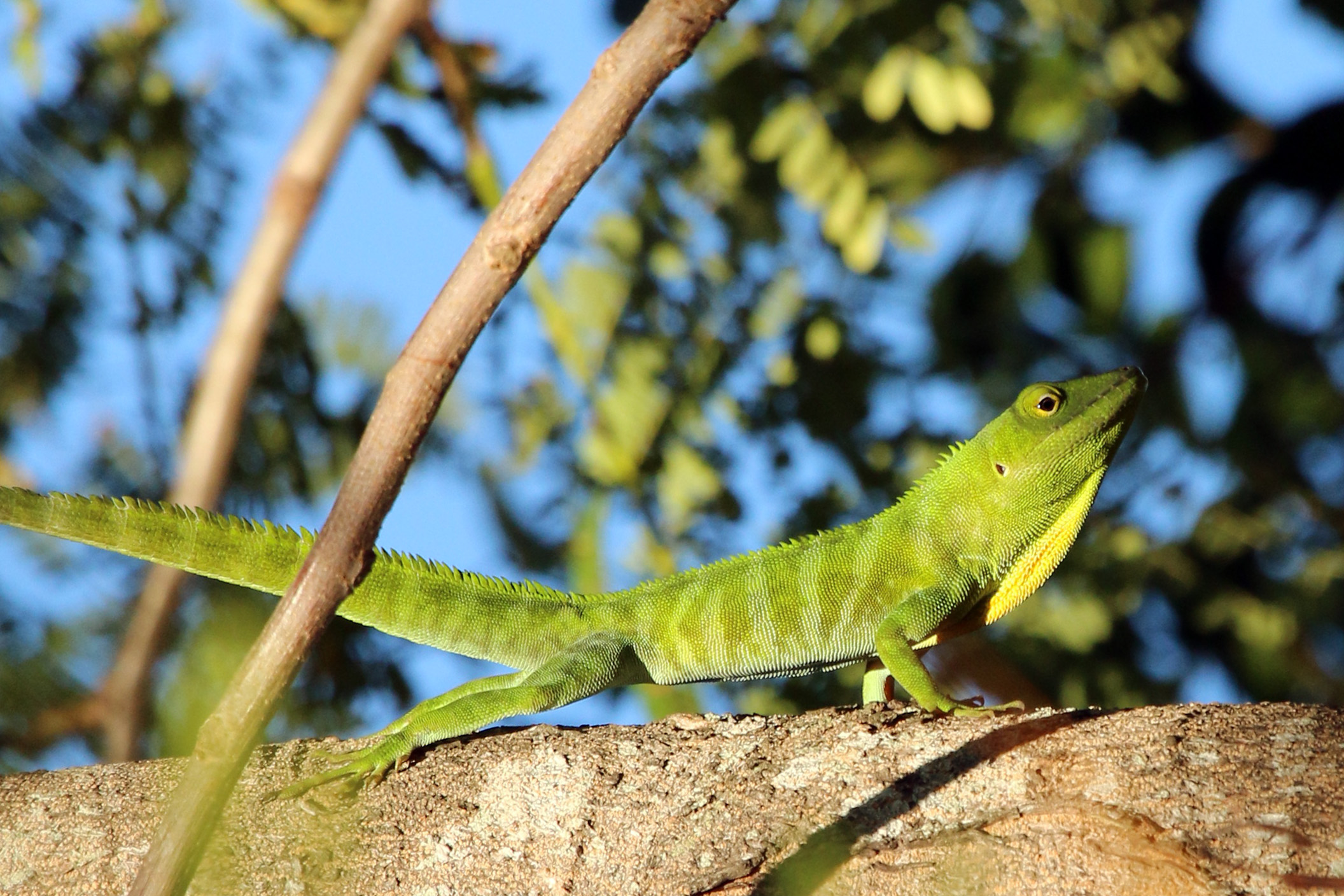
- At Strawberry Hill, Jamaica

Conservation status
- Least Concern (IUCN 3.1)

Scientific classification
- Kingdom: Animalia
- Phylum: Chordata
- Class: Reptilia
- Order: Squamata
- Suborder: Iguania
- Family: Dactyloidae
- Genus: Anolis
- Species: A. garmani

Binomial name
- Anolis garmani Stejneger, 1899

Synonyms
- Lacerta bullaris Linnaeus, 1758; Anolis garmani Steneger, 1899 (nomen novum); Norops garmani — Savage & Guyer, 1991

= Anolis garmani =

Species of lizard

Anolis garmani, also known commonly as the Jamaican giant anole, the Jamaican anole, and the Jamaica giant anole, is a species of lizard in the family Dactyloidae. The species is endemic to Jamaica, but has been introduced to Florida.

== Taxonomy ==
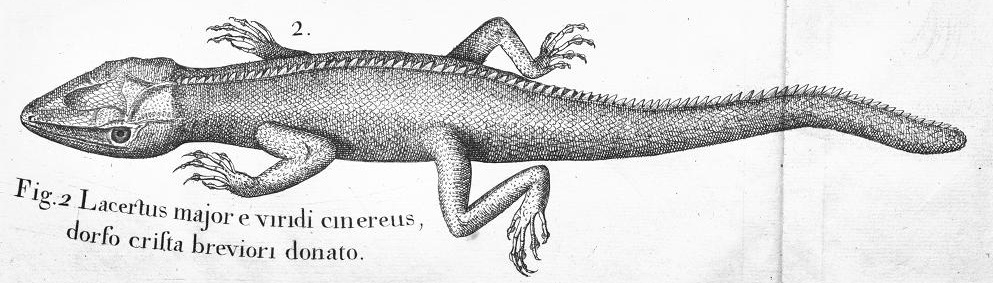
Illustration by Hans Sloane, identified by later authors as being of Anolis garmani.

According to Anthony Russell and Aaron Bauer, the taxonomic history of Anolis garmani can be traced back to 1725, when Hans Sloane published a work in which he spoke of and illustrated a large greenish-grey lizard with a short dorsal crest. In 1743, Mark Catesby published a figure of an anole under the name Lacerta viridis jamaicensis that has been identified as a member of Anolis garmani by later authors, and there is evidence suggesting that it was off this figure that Carl Linnaeus based his 1758 description of Lacerta bullaris on, which would make that name the most senior synonym for the species. Leonhard Stejneger was the first to use the name Anolis garmani for the species, doing so in his 1899 description of it. The specific name, garmani, is in honor of American herpetologist Samuel Garman.

== Distribution and habitat ==
The Jamaican giant anole is native to Jamaica. It has been introduced into Florida. There are recent records from Grand Cayman, but it is unclear if it has become established there. The preferred natural habitat of A. garmani is forest, at altitudes from sea level to 1,300 m (4,300 ft), but it is also found on large trees in gardens.

== Description ==
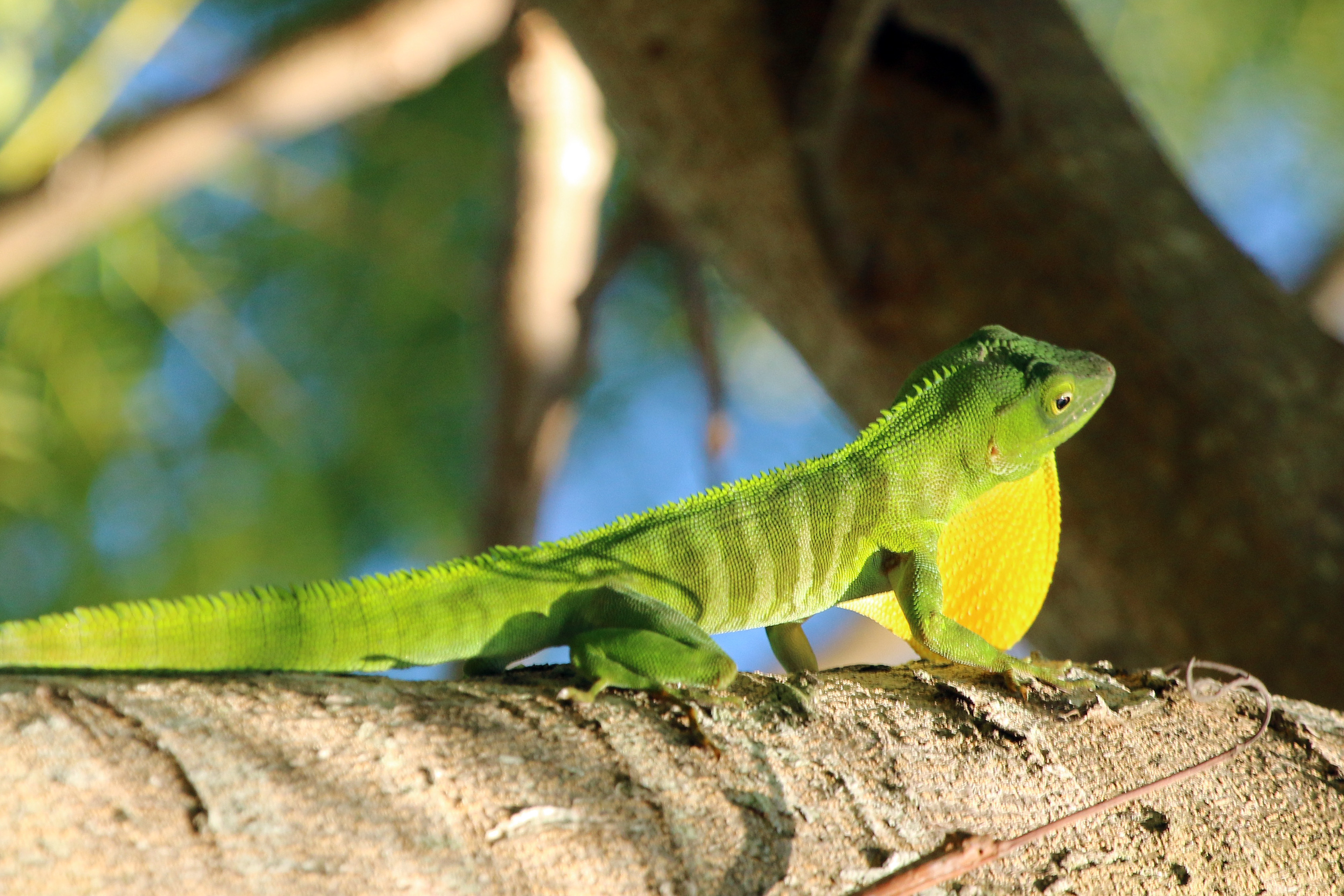
Showing dewlap

The Jamaican giant anole is by far the largest species in the Norops group, with adult males having a snout–vent length (SVL) of 10–13.1 cm (3.9–5.2 in) and females 8–9.5 cm (3.1–3.7 in). Adults are generally 20–30 cm (7.9–11.8 in) in total length, including tail, with a maximum reported total length of 36.8 cm (14 in).

Although generally green, it turns dark brown at night. The male has an orange-centered yellow dewlap, which is small and dusky in the female.

== Behavior ==
A. garmani is arboreal.

== Diet ==
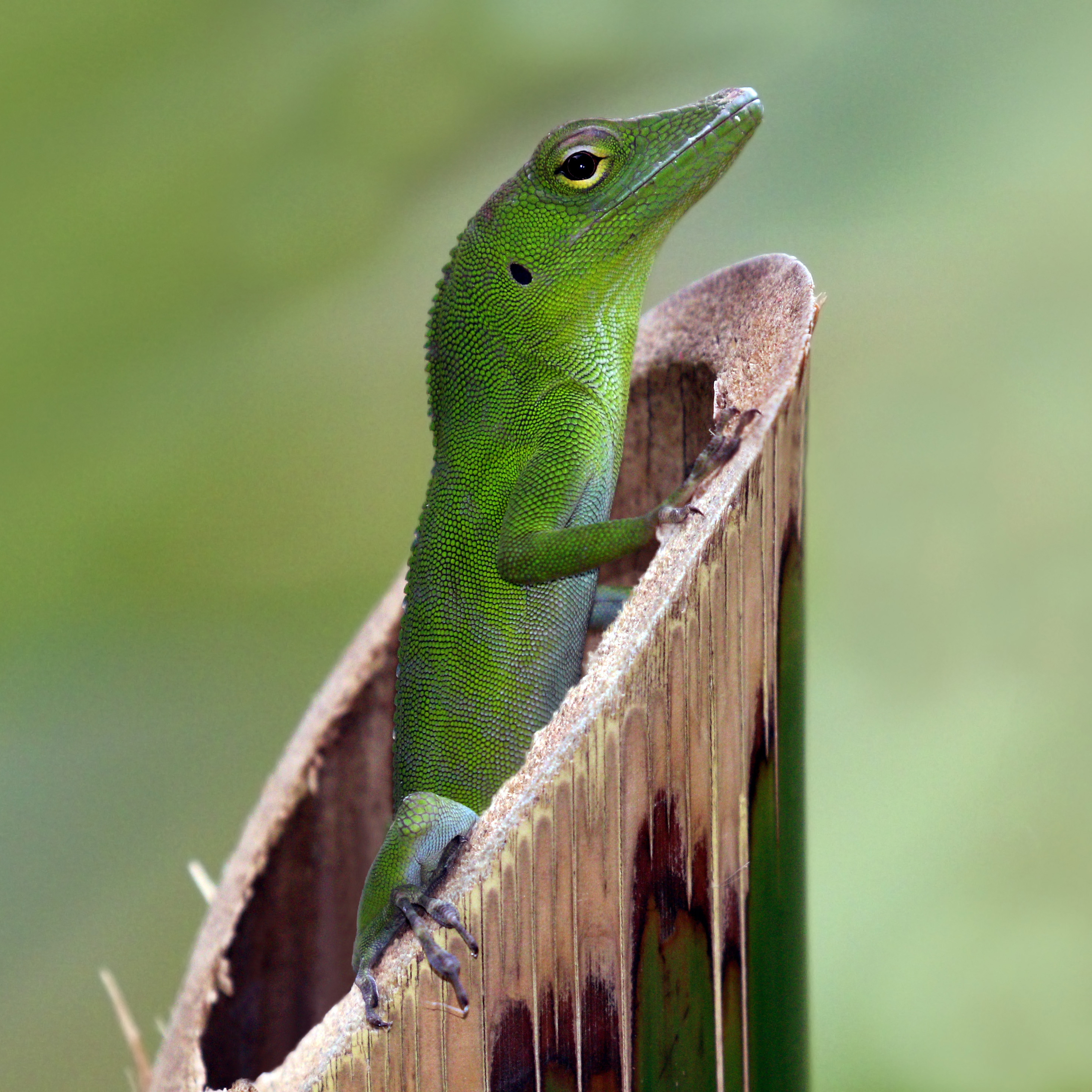
Juvenile in Jamaica

A. garmani preys upon invertebrates and small anoles, and it also eats fruits.

== Reproduction ==
A. garmani is oviparous.

== See also ==
- List of Anolis lizards
