= Anolis ravitergum =

Scientific classification
- Kingdom: Animalia
- Phylum: Chordata
- Class: Reptilia
- Order: Squamata
- Suborder: Iguania
- Family: Dactyloidae
- Genus: Anolis
- Species: A. ravitergum

Binomial name
- Anolis ravitergum Schwartz, 1968

Species of lizard

Anolis ravitergum, the Hispaniolan gracile anole or bark anole, is a species of lizard in the family Dactyloidae. The species is found in the Dominican Republic.
