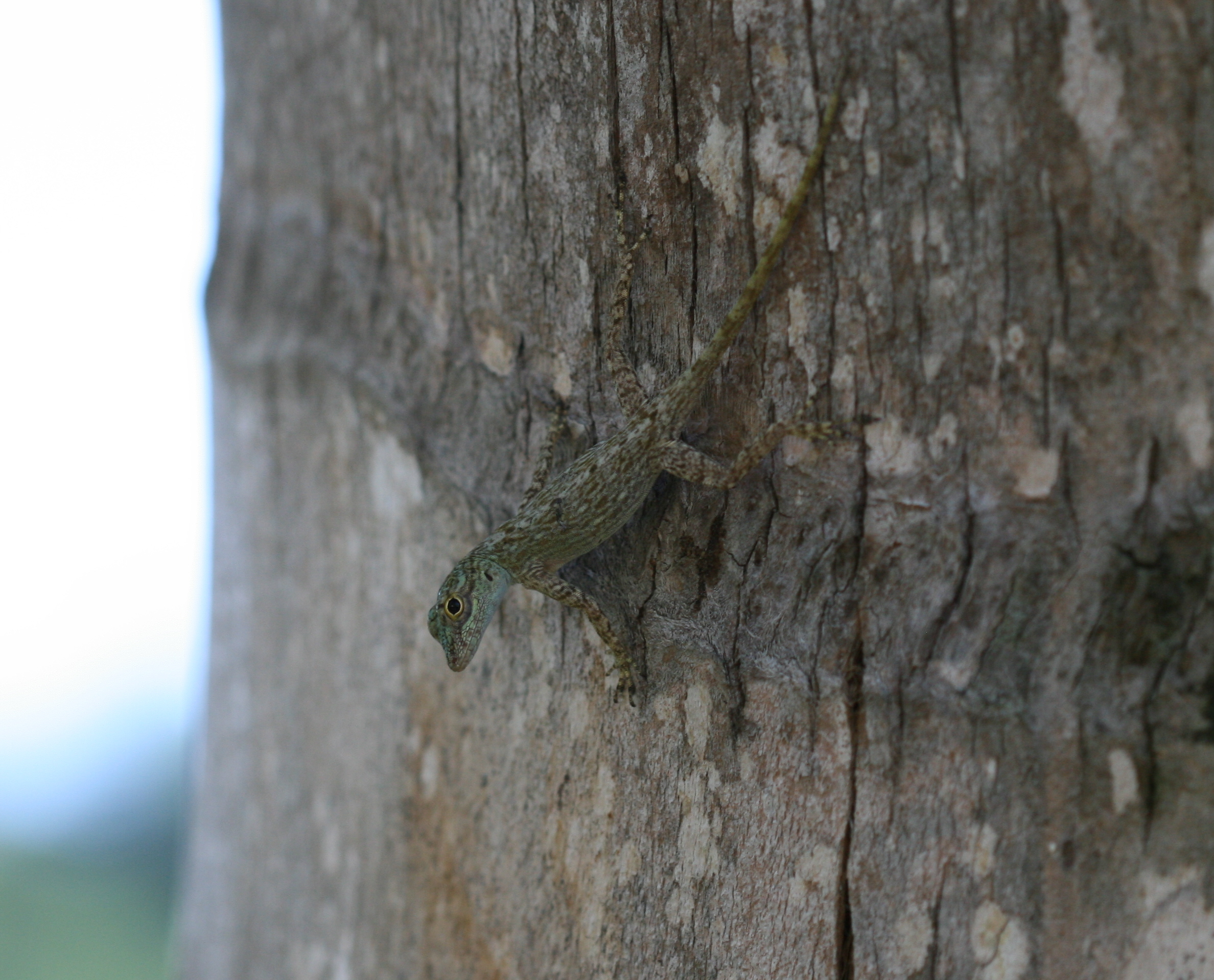

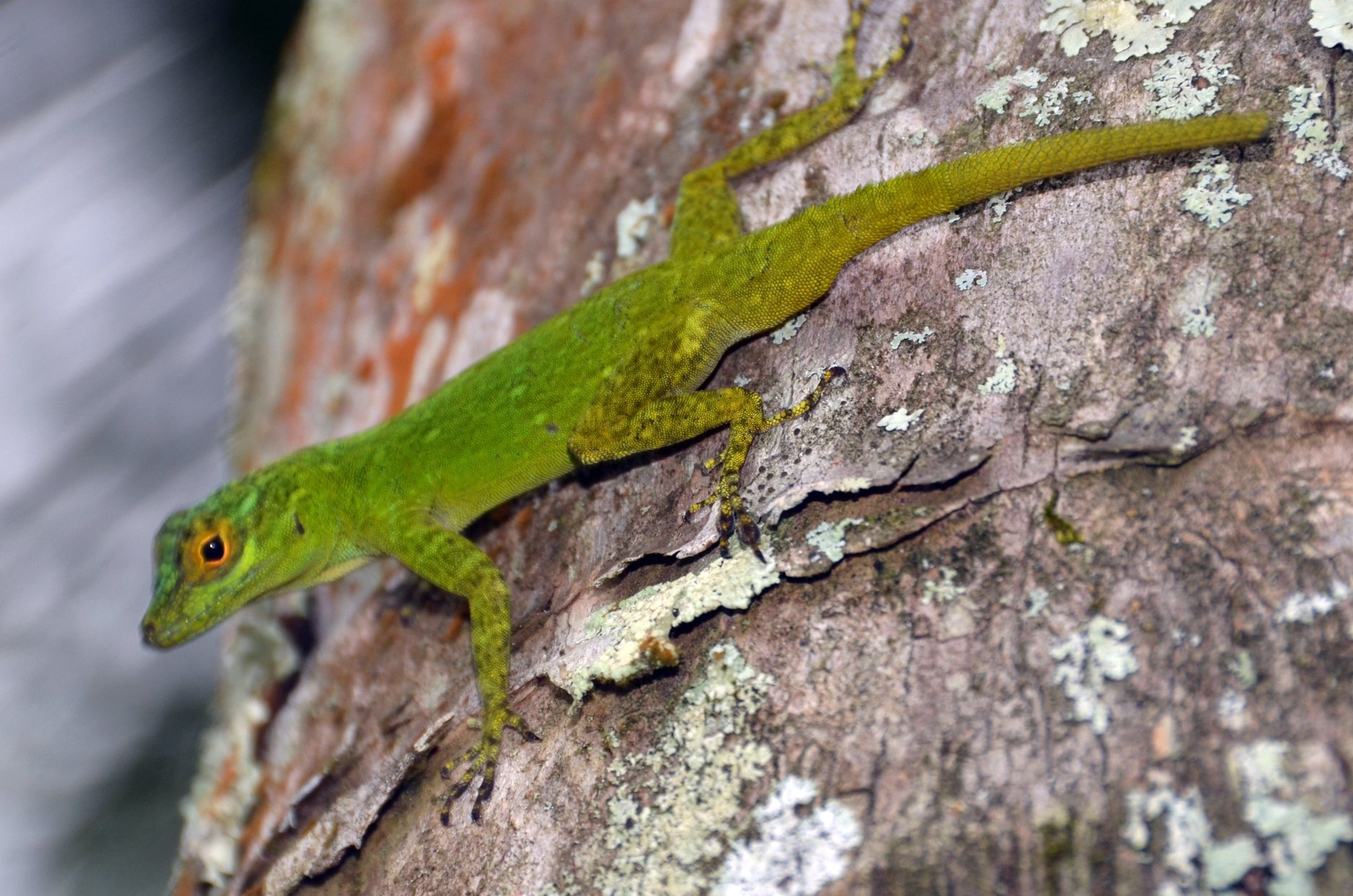
- Gray-brown and green individuals

Conservation status
- Least Concern (IUCN 3.1)

Scientific classification
- Domain: Eukaryota
- Kingdom: Animalia
- Phylum: Chordata
- Class: Reptilia
- Order: Squamata
- Suborder: Iguania
- Family: Dactyloidae
- Genus: Anolis
- Species: A. distichus

Binomial name
- Anolis distichus (Cope, 1861)

Subspecies
- See text

= Anolis distichus =

Species of lizard

Anolis distichus, the bark anole, North Caribbean bark anole, or Hispaniolan gracile anole, is a species of anole lizard (US: /əˈnoʊ.li/) native to Hispaniola (both the Dominican Republic and Haiti) and the Bahamas, and introduced to Florida, where it was first recorded in 1946. It spends most its time on tree trunks. There are several subspecies and it is highly variable in color. Its body ranges from gray-brown to green, and the dewlap is cream-white, over yellow and orange to red. In Florida, most are gray-brown with a cream-white (pale yellow) dewlap, but more greenish individuals with a yellow-edged red dewlap also occur. It is a fairly small anole, reaching up to 12.7 cm (5.0 in) in length.

== Subspecies ==
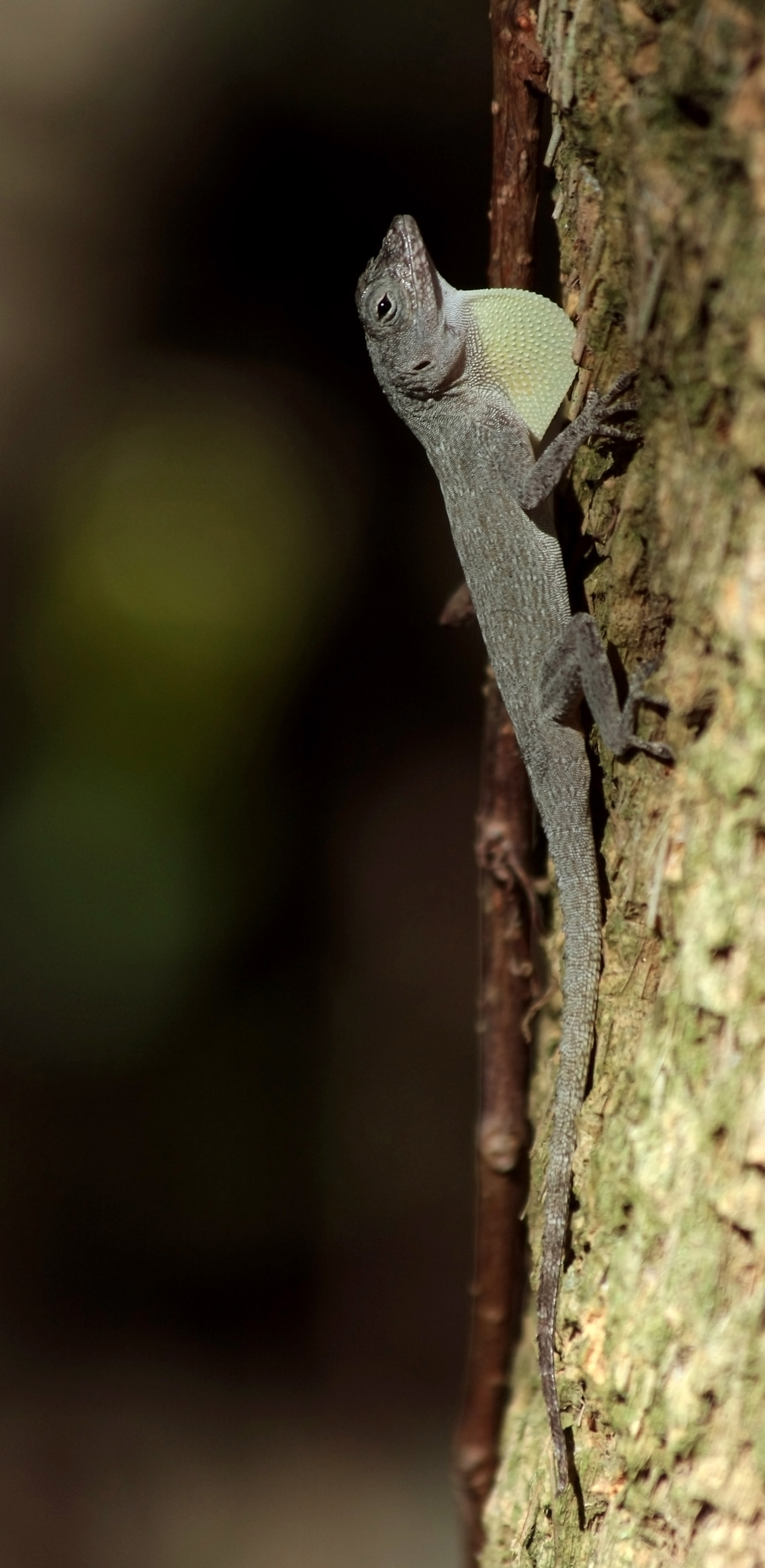
Gray-brown with cream-white (pale yellow) dewlap

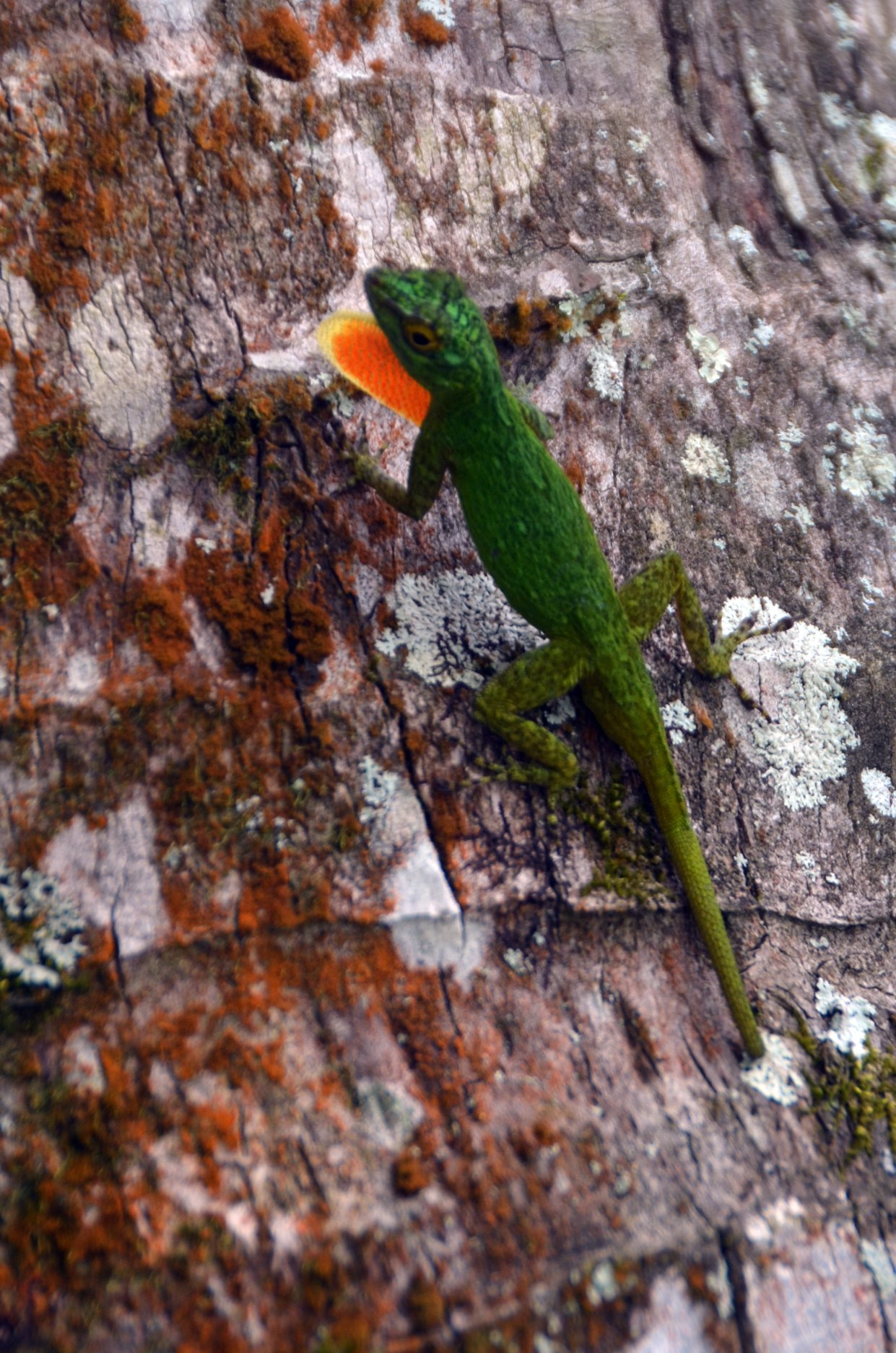
Green with yellow-edged red dewlap

Subspecies listed alphabetically. Some of these may warrant recognition as separate species.

- A. d. distichus Cope, 1861
- A. d. biminiensis Oliver, 1948
- A. d. dapsilis Schwartz, 1968
- A. d. distichoides Rosén 1911
- A. d. floridanus Smith & Mccauley 1948
- A. d. juliae Cochran 1934
- A. d. ocior Schwartz, 1968
- A. d. patruelis Schwartz, 1968
- A. d. sejunctus Schwartz, 1968
- A. d. suppar Schwartz, 1968
- A. d. tostus Schwartz, 1968
