= Alligator lizard =

An alligator lizard is any one of various species of lizards in the family Anguidae that have some shared characteristics. The term may specifically refer to:

Species of the genus Elgaria (western alligator lizards)

- Cedros Island alligator lizard (Elgaria cedrosensis)
- Central peninsular alligator lizard (Elgaria velazquezi)
- Madrean alligator lizard (Elgaria kingii)
- Northern alligator lizard (Elgaria coerulea)
- Panamint alligator lizard (Elgaria panamintina)
- San Lucan alligator lizard (Elgaria paucicarinata)
- Southern alligator lizard (Elgaria multicarinata)

Species of the genus Gerrhonotus

- Farr's alligator lizard (Gerrhonotus farri)
- Pygmy alligator lizard (Gerrhonotus parvus)
- Species called Texas alligator lizard
  - Gerrhonotus infernalis
  - Gerrhonotus liocephalus, also called Wiegmann's alligator lizard and smooth-headed alligator lizard
- Lugo's alligator lizard (Gerrhonotus lugoi)

Species of the genus Abronia (arboreal alligator lizards)

- Coapilla arboreal alligator lizard (Abronia cunemica)
