= Texas alligator lizard =

There are two species of lizard named Texas alligator lizard:

- Gerrhonotus liocephalus
- Gerrhonotus infernalis
