= P. lagunensis =

P. lagunensis may refer to:

- Plestiodon lagunensis, a skink native to the Baja California peninsula
- Praemancalla lagunensis, an extinct bird
