= E. lagunensis =

E. lagunensis may refer to:

- Euphorbia lagunensis, a poisonous plant
- Eumeces lagunensis, a skink native to the Baja California peninsula
