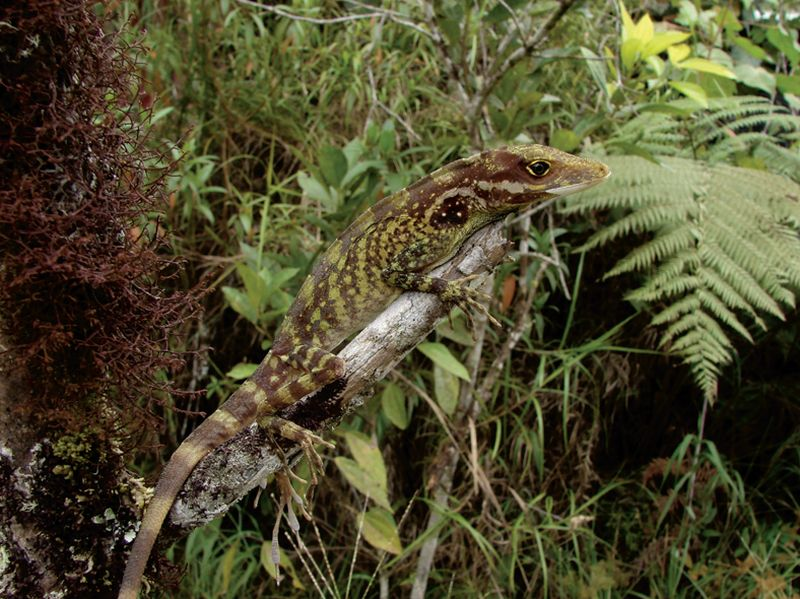
- Male

Conservation status
- Vulnerable (IUCN 3.1)

Scientific classification
- Kingdom: Animalia
- Phylum: Chordata
- Class: Reptilia
- Order: Squamata
- Suborder: Iguania
- Family: Anolidae
- Genus: Anolis
- Species: A. podocarpus

Binomial name
- Anolis podocarpus Ayala-Varela & Torres-Carvajal, 2010

Synonyms
- Dactyloa podocarpus Nicholson et al., 2012

= Anolis podocarpus =

Species of lizard

Anolis podocarpus is a species of anole lizard in the family Dactyloidae. It was first described by Fernando P. Ayala-Varela and Omar Torres-Carvajal in 2010, the type locality being the Podocarpus National Park at Romerillos Alto in Zamora-Chinchipe Province, Ecuador on the southeastern slopes of the Andes. The specific name refers to the Podocarpus trees which are found in the Park.

== Description ==
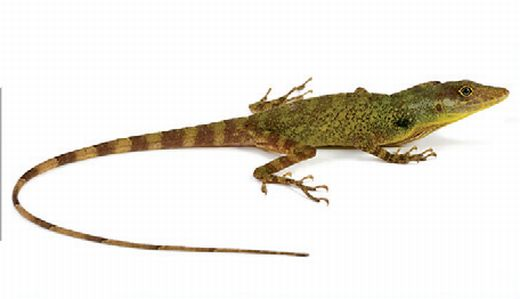

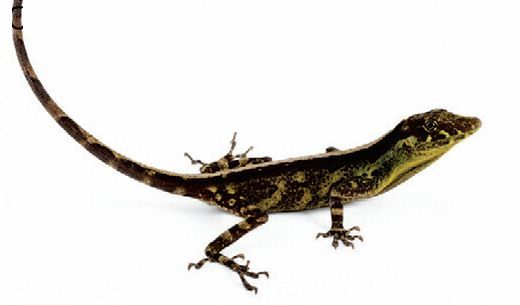
Male holotype (top), female (bottom)

Anolis podocarpus is a medium-sized lizard with a snout-to-vent length of up to 96 mm (3.8 in) and a slender tail more than twice as long. Females are usually slightly smaller than males. The forelimbs are short and the hind limbs about twice as long. There are five digits on the forefeet and four long digits on the hind feet. The digits have toepads which overlap the first phalange. Both sexes have a large dewlap which extends to behind the forelimbs. The dewlap has two to five (usually three or four) longitudinal rows of minute granular scales separated by bare skin. The colouring of this lizard is variable. The males are mainly yellowish-green or green with seven brown bands on the dorsal surface, a large dark spot on the shoulder and the limbs and tail banded transversely in dark brown. The ventral surface is yellowish-green or yellow, the dewlap reddish brown and the ventral side of the hind limbs cream with reddish-brown reticulations. The females are somewhat similar

but have a greenish head with a blue tongue, and the basal colour of the body is blackish-brown. There is a cream vertebral stripe, the dewlap is purplish-brown and the ventral surface is darker than in males. This species closely resembles Anolis fitchi but differs from it mainly in the arrangement of scales on the dewlap and the size of the dewlap, that of A. podocarpus being smaller.

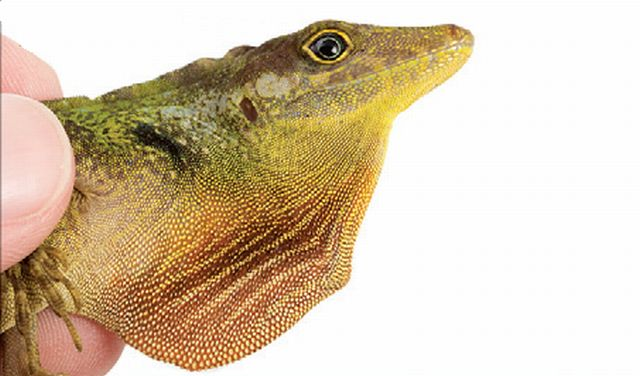

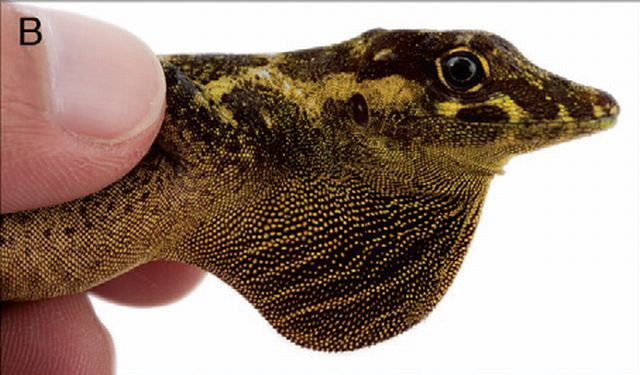
Dewlaps of male (top) and female (bottom)

== Distribution and habitat ==
Anolis podocarpus occurs in the upper basin of the Zamora River in southeastern Ecuador in secondary forest, montane cloud forest and evergreen forest. Individuals were found at night within a few metres of the ground, sleeping in a head-upward position on the large leaves of ferns, arums or bananas. Others were found on low branches overhanging streams and on the banks of streams.

== Biology ==
Little is known of the natural history of this species. It is oviparous; a female captured in early August laid a single egg measuring 18.5 mm × 8.4 mm (0.73 in × 0.33 in) three weeks later. A juvenile with a snout-to-vent length of 37 mm (1.5 in) was captured in March.
