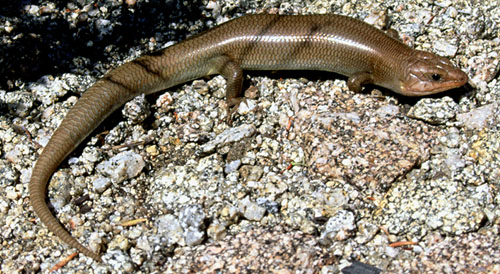

Conservation status
- Least Concern (IUCN 3.1)

- Secure (NatureServe)

Scientific classification
- Kingdom: Animalia
- Phylum: Chordata
- Class: Reptilia
- Order: Squamata
- Family: Scincidae
- Genus: Plestiodon
- Species: P. gilberti

Binomial name
- Plestiodon gilberti (Van Denburgh, 1896)
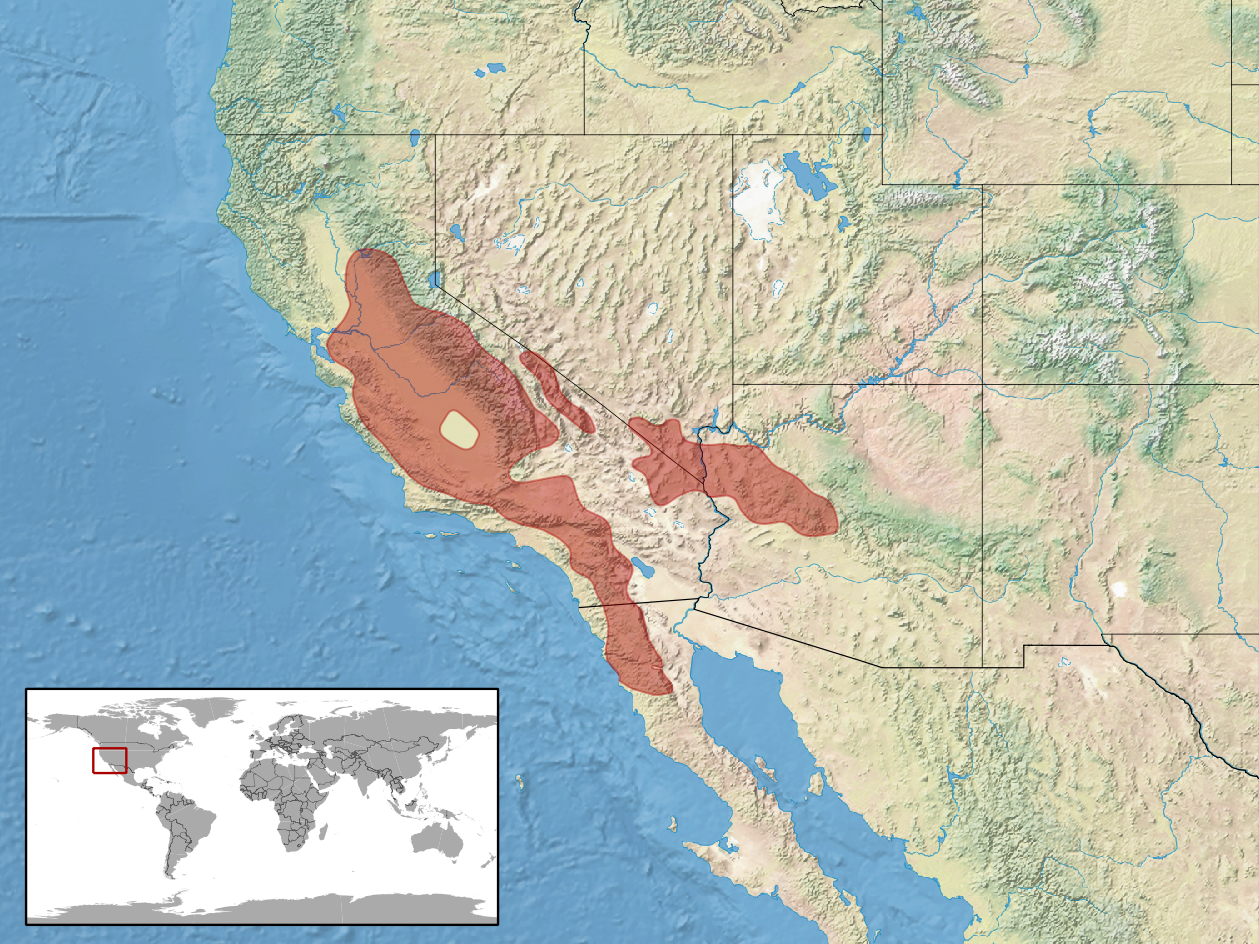

Synonyms
- Eumeces gilberti Van Denburgh, 1896; Plestiodon gilberti — Schmitz et al., 2004

= Plestiodon gilberti =

Gilbert's skink

Species of lizard

Plestiodon gilberti, commonly known as Gilbert's skink, is a species of heavy-bodied medium-sized lizard in the family Scincidae. The species is endemic to the southwestern United States and northwestern Mexico, and grows to about 7 to 12 cm (3 to 4.5 in) in total length (including tail).

== Taxonomy and etymology ==
Plestiodon gilberti (formerly Eumeces Gilberti) was coined by John Van Denburgh in honor of Dr. Charles H. Gilbert, who was Denburgh’s professor at Stanford University and inspiration for his involvement in herpetology.

Together with the western skink (P. skiltonianus), the San Lucan skink (P. lagunensis), and the four-lined Asiatic skink (P. quadrilineatus), Gilbert's skink belongs to the so-called "skiltonianus group". The exact taxonomy within this group is being questioned and may need revision following DNA analysis research.

== Subspecies ==
There are five subspecies of Plestiodon gilberti, including the nominotypical subspecies.

- Plestiodon gilberti arizonensis (Lowe & Shannon, 1954) – Arizona skink
- Plestiodon gilberti gilberti (Van Denburgh, 1896) – greater brown skink
- Plestiodon gilberti placerensis (Rodgers, 1944) – northern brown skink
- Plestiodon gilberti cancellosus (Rodgers & Fitch, 1947) – variegated skink
- Plestiodon gilberti rubricaudatus (Taylor, 1935) – western red-tailed skink

Nota bene: A trinomial authority in parentheses indicates that the subspecies was originally described in a genus other than Plestiodon.

The subspecies P. g. placerensis is named after Placer County, California, where it occurs.

== Geographic range ==
Gilbert's skink occurs mainly in California. It is found in the northern San Joaquin Valley, in the foothills of the Sierra Nevada from Butte County southward, and along the inner flanks of the Coast Ranges from San Francisco Bay to the Mexican border and into northern Baja California. It is also found in the mountains of southern California, and at scattered mountain localities in the eastern desert from Mono County to San Bernardino County. Spotted in Kern County, west of the Rand Mountains bordering San Bernardino, but greater numbers were found east, dispersed north of the Mojave Desert. Isolated populations also occur in western Arizona as well as in southern Nevada.

== Habitat ==
Gilbert's skink occurs in habitats ranging from sea level to elevations of about 2,200 m (7,200 ft). Found in a wide variety of habitats, this lizard is most common in early successional stages or open areas within habitats in which it occurs, which range from grassland to open chaparral or open pine forests. Heavy brush and densely forested areas are generally avoided.

== Description ==
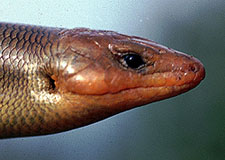
Close-up of head.

Gilbert's skink is a heavy-bodied lizard with small legs. Adults are uniformly colored in green, grey, olive or brown. Juveniles have light stripes on the sides and the back enclosing a broad black or brown stripe. This dark stripe stops near the base of the waxy-pink tail. The striping fades with growth and maturation faster in males than in females. In some environments, Gilbert’s skinks are known to be very similar in appearance to western skinks until they reach maturity.

== Behavior ==
A robust skink, P. gilberti is seldom seen in the open. It forages through leaf litter and dense vegetation, occasionally digging through loose soil. It is a good burrower and often constructs its own shelter by burrowing under surface objects such as rocks or rotting logs.

The male counterparts of the P. gilberti are not observed to be territorial creatures, despite male aggression being typical in other Plestiodon species. When confronted, the P. gilberti would flee into leaf litter and away from sight.

== Diet ==
P. gilberti is typically known to feed on small invertebrates, such as insects and spiders.

It has a quirk in which it insists upon ingesting its prey headfirst, no matter the angle at which the prey confronts it, anteriorly or posteriorly. An instinctual tactic used by the P. gilberti to lessen struggle from a potentially difficult prey.

== Reproduction ==
The reproductive season for P. gilberti varies geographically and from year to year depending on local conditions. Little is known about the timing of reproduction, but it is probably similar to the Western Skink, which lays its eggs in June and July. Adult females construct nest chambers in loose moist soil several centimeters deep, especially under flat stones. Clutch size varies from 3 to 9 eggs.

== See also ==
- Broad-headed skink, a lizard with similar morphology
