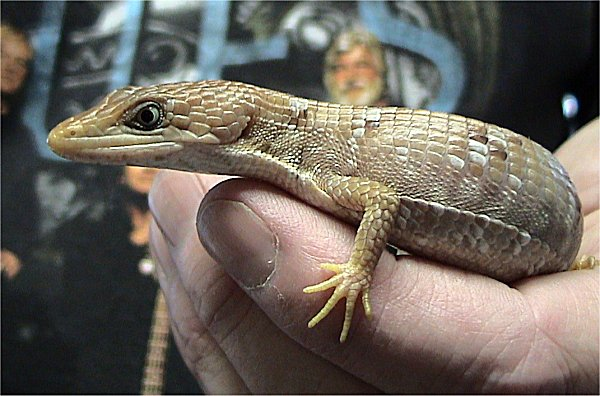
- Texas alligator lizard (Gerrhonotus infernalis)

Scientific classification
- Kingdom: Animalia
- Phylum: Chordata
- Class: Reptilia
- Order: Squamata
- Suborder: Anguimorpha
- Family: Anguidae
- Subfamily: Gerrhonotinae
- Genus: Gerrhonotus; Wiegmann, 1828

Species
- 9 recognized species, see text.

= Gerrhonotus =

Genus of lizards

Gerrhonotus is a genus of anguid lizards that are commonly referred to as alligator lizards, due to a vague resemblance to an alligator. Most species are restricted to Mexico, but a few range into Guatemala or Texas, and G. rhombifer is from Costa Rica and Panama. Along with glass lizards (Ophisaurus) and many other lizards, alligator lizards have the ability to regrow their tail.

== Species and subspecies ==
There are nine recognized species in the genus Gerrhonotus. One species has recognized subspecies.

- Gerrhonotus farri Bryson & Graham, 2010 – Farr's alligator lizard
- Gerrhonotus infernalis Baird, 1859 – Texas alligator lizard
- Gerrhonotus lazcanoi Banda-Leal, Nevárez-de los Reyes & Bryson, 2017
- Gerrhonotus liocephalus Wiegmann, 1828 – smooth-headed alligator lizard, Texas alligator lizard, Wiegmann's alligator lizard
  - Gerrhonotus liocephalus austrinus Hartweg & Tihen, 1946
  - Gerrhonotus liocephalus liocephalus Wiegmann, 1828
  - Gerrhonotus liocephalus loweryi Tihen, 1948 – Lowery's alligator lizard
- Gerrhonotus lugoi C.J. McCoy, 1970 – Lugo's alligator lizard
- Gerrhonotus mccoyi García-Vázquez, Contreras-Arquieta, Trujano-Ortega & Nieto-Montes de Oca, 2018
- Gerrhonotus ophiurus Cope, 1867
- Gerrhonotus parvus Knight & Scudday, 1985 – pygmy alligator lizard
- Gerrhonotus rhombifer (W. Peters, 1876) – isthmian alligator lizard
