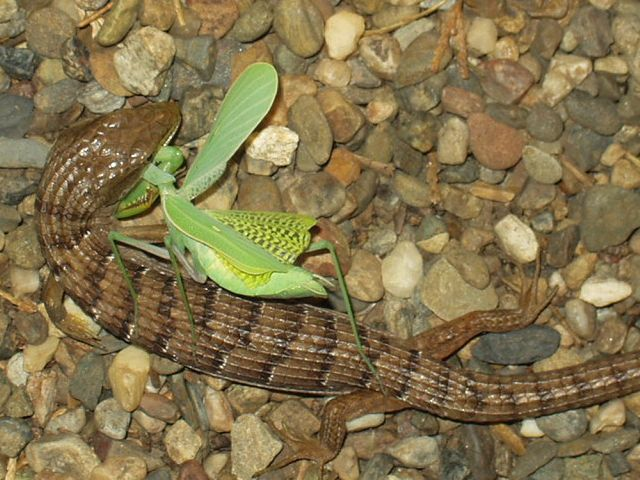
- Elgaria multicarinata eating a mantis

Scientific classification
- Kingdom: Animalia
- Phylum: Chordata
- Class: Reptilia
- Order: Squamata
- Suborder: Anguimorpha
- Family: Anguidae
- Subfamily: Gerrhonotinae
- Genus: Elgaria; Gray, 1838

Type species
- Elgaria multicarinata

Species
- Seven, see text.

= Elgaria =

Genus of lizards

Elgaria is a genus of New World lizards in the family Anguidae. Their common name is western alligator lizards. There are seven species in the genus.

== Geographic range ==
Species in the genus Elgaria are distributed in western North America, from Mexico to Canada.

== Species ==
There are seven species:

Image	Scientific name	Common name	Distribution
	Elgaria cedrosensis (Fitch, 1934)	Cedros Island alligator lizard	Mexico (Cedros Island, and coastal S Baja California Norte)
	Elgaria coerulea (Wiegmann, 1828)	Northern alligator lizard	Pacific Coast and in the Rocky Mountains from southern British Columbia through Washington, northern Idaho and western Montana south through Oregon to the coastal range and the Sierra Nevada in central California
	Elgaria kingii Gray, 1838	Madrean alligator lizard	Southwestern United States and adjacent northwestern Mexico
	Elgaria multicarinata (Blainville, 1835)	Southern alligator lizard	Baja California to the state of Washington
	Elgaria panamintina (Stebbins, 1958)	Panamint alligator lizard	California
	Elgaria paucicarinata (Fitch, 1934)	San Lucan alligator lizard	Mexico
	Elgaria velazquezi Grismer & Hollingsworth, 2001	Central Peninsular alligator lizard	Mexico

Nota bene: A binomial authority in parentheses indicates that the species was originally described in a genus other than Elgaria.
