= Gerrhonotus ophiurus =

Conservation status
- Least Concern (IUCN 3.1)

Scientific classification
- Kingdom: Animalia
- Phylum: Chordata
- Class: Reptilia
- Order: Squamata
- Suborder: Anguimorpha
- Family: Anguidae
- Genus: Gerrhonotus
- Species: G. ophiurus

Binomial name
- Gerrhonotus ophiurus Cope, 1867
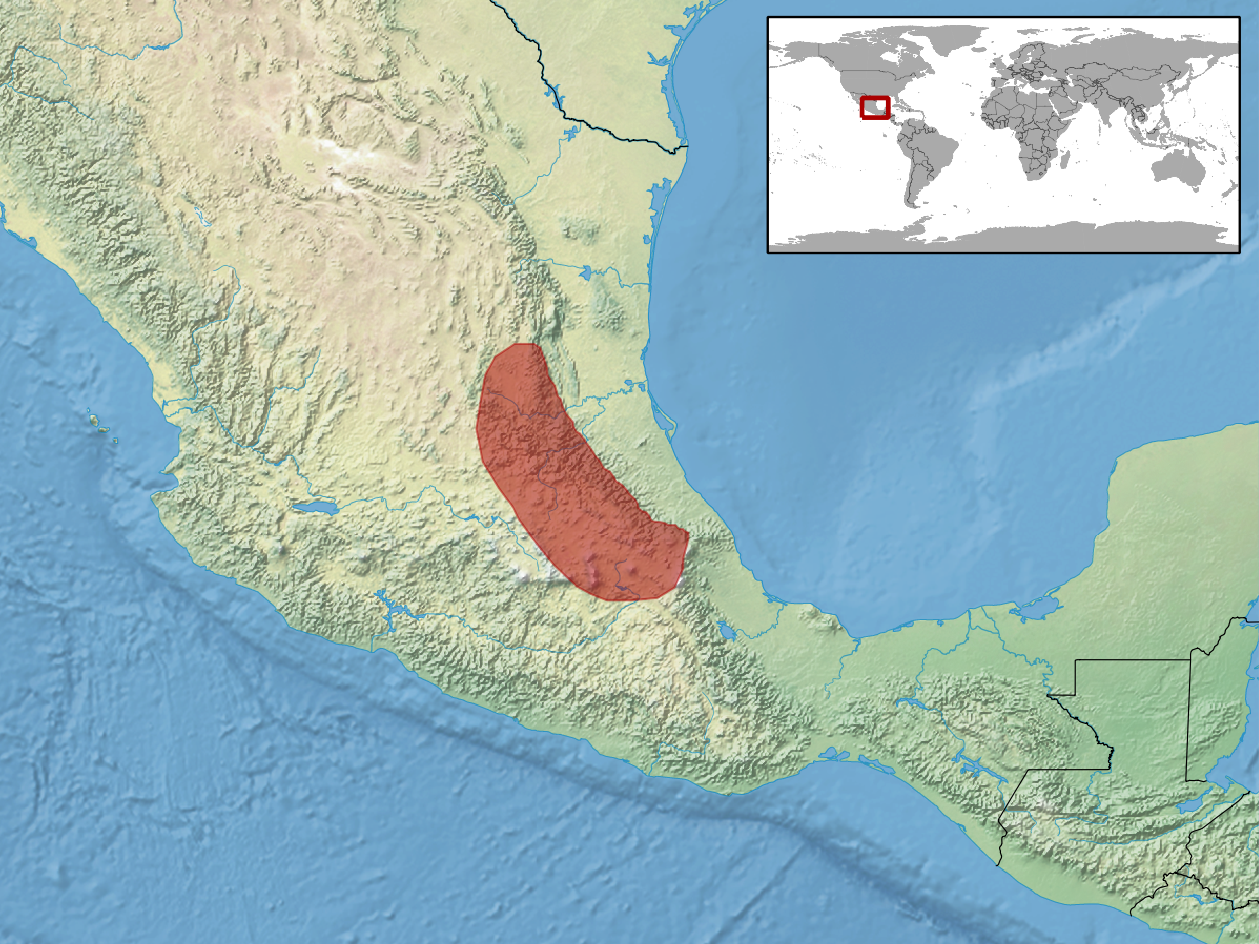
- Gerrhonotus ophiurus distribution

Species of lizard

Gerrhonotus ophiurus is a species of lizard of the Anguidae family. It is found in Mexico.
