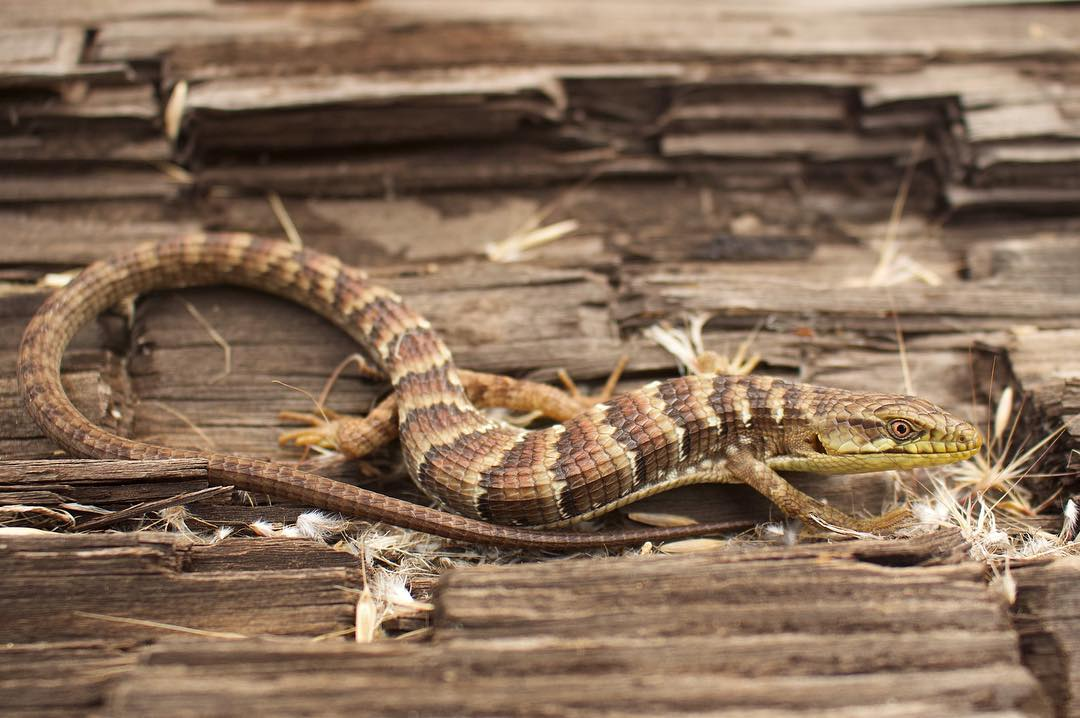

Conservation status
- Least Concern (IUCN 3.1)

Scientific classification
- Kingdom: Animalia
- Phylum: Chordata
- Class: Reptilia
- Order: Squamata
- Suborder: Anguimorpha
- Family: Anguidae
- Genus: Elgaria
- Species: E. multicarinata

Binomial name
- Elgaria multicarinata (Blainville, 1835)
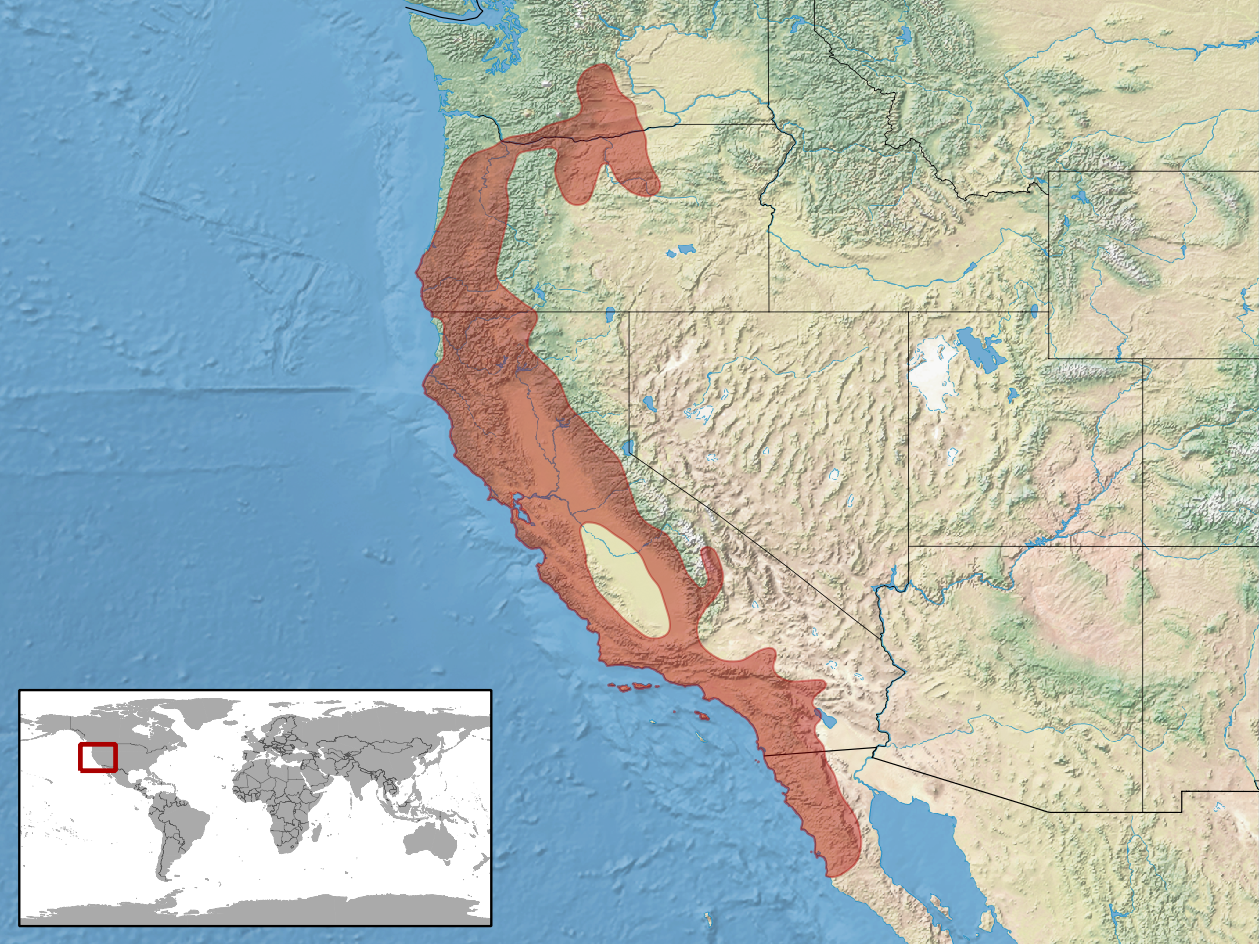

Synonyms
- Cordylus (Gerrhonotus) multi-carinatus Blainville, 1835; Gerrhonotus multicarinatus (Blainville, 1835)

= Southern alligator lizard =

Species of lizard

The southern alligator lizard (Elgaria multicarinata) is a common species of lizard in the family Anguidae. The species is native to the Pacific coast of North America. It ranges from Baja California to the state of Washington and lives in a variety of habitats including grasslands, chaparral, forests, and even urban areas. In dry climates, it is likely to be found in moist areas or near streams. There are five recognized subspecies.

== Subspecies ==
The following five subspecies are recognized as being valid, including the nominotypical subspecies.

- Elgaria multicarinata ignava (Van Denburgh, 1905)
- Elgaria multicarinata multicarinata (Blainville, 1835)
- Elgaria multicarinata nana (Fitch, 1934)
- Elgaria multicarinata scincicauda (Skilton, 1849)
- Elgaria multicarinata webbii (Baird, 1859)

== Taxonomy and etymology ==
The generic name Elgaria is possibly named for an "Elgar" or a pun on "alligator." The specific name multicarinata refers to the keeled scales characteristic of this species. The common name "alligator lizard" is a reference to the fact that the back and belly scales of these lizards are reinforced by bone, as they are in alligators.

The subspecific name webbii is in honor of Thomas Hopkins Webb (1801–1866) who was Secretary of the United States and Mexican Boundary Survey (1848–1855). The subspecific name scincicauda means "skink tail".

== Geographic range and habitat ==
The southern alligator lizard is native to the Pacific coast of North America, ranging from the state of Washington to Baja California. These lizards can be found across many diverse habitats, including grassland, open forest, chaparral, suburban and urban areas, and even into the desert along the Mojave River. This species is particularly common in foothill oak woodlands, and is often found hiding under rocks, logs, or other surface cover.

== Description ==
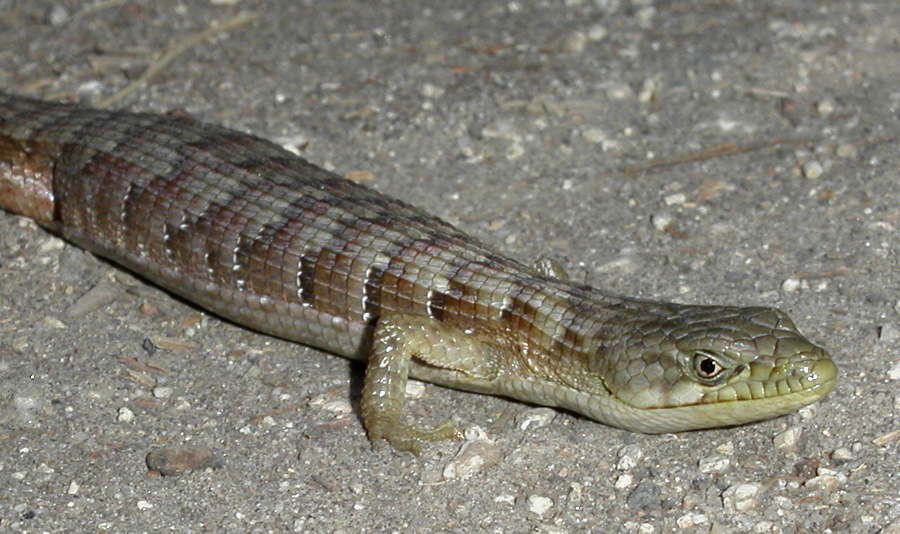
Adult southern alligator lizard, San Joaquin County California

The southern alligator lizard measures from 3 to 7 in (8 to 18 cm) in snout-to-vent length (SVL). Including tail, it can reach a foot in length (30 cm). It has a round thick body with small legs and a long somewhat prehensile tail that can be twice as long as the lizard's body. Like many lizards, this species can drop its tail if attacked, possibly giving it a chance to flee. It lives on average 10 to 15 years, and survives well in captivity.

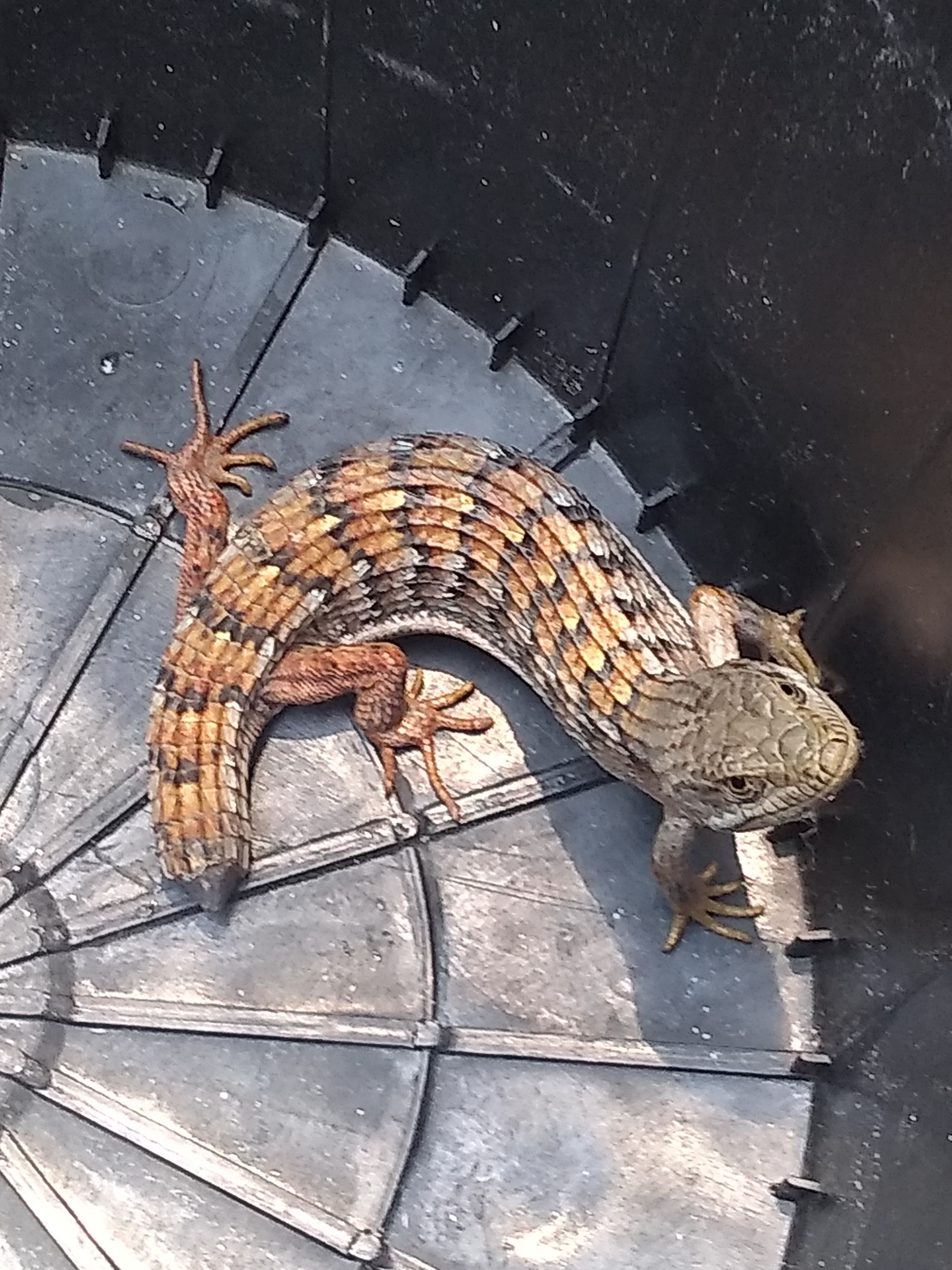
Showing autotomized tail

The color of this species is variable, and can be brown, gray, green, or yellowish above, often with red blotches on the middle of the back. Usually there are between 9 and 13 dark crossbands on the back, sides, and tail, with adjacent white spots. These crossbands can be pronounced or covered with reddish or yellowish color.

The scales of E. multicarinata are keeled on the back, sides, and legs. There are 14 rows of scales across the back at the middle of the body. A band of smaller granular scales separates the larger scales on the back and stomach, creating a fold along each side of the animal. These folds allow the body to expand to hold food or eggs.

== Diet ==
E. multicarinata eats small arthropods, slugs, lizards, small mammals, and occasionally young birds and eggs.

The southern alligator lizard frequently eats western black widow spiders, and has demonstrated an immunity to the spider's potent venom.

== Behavior and reproduction ==
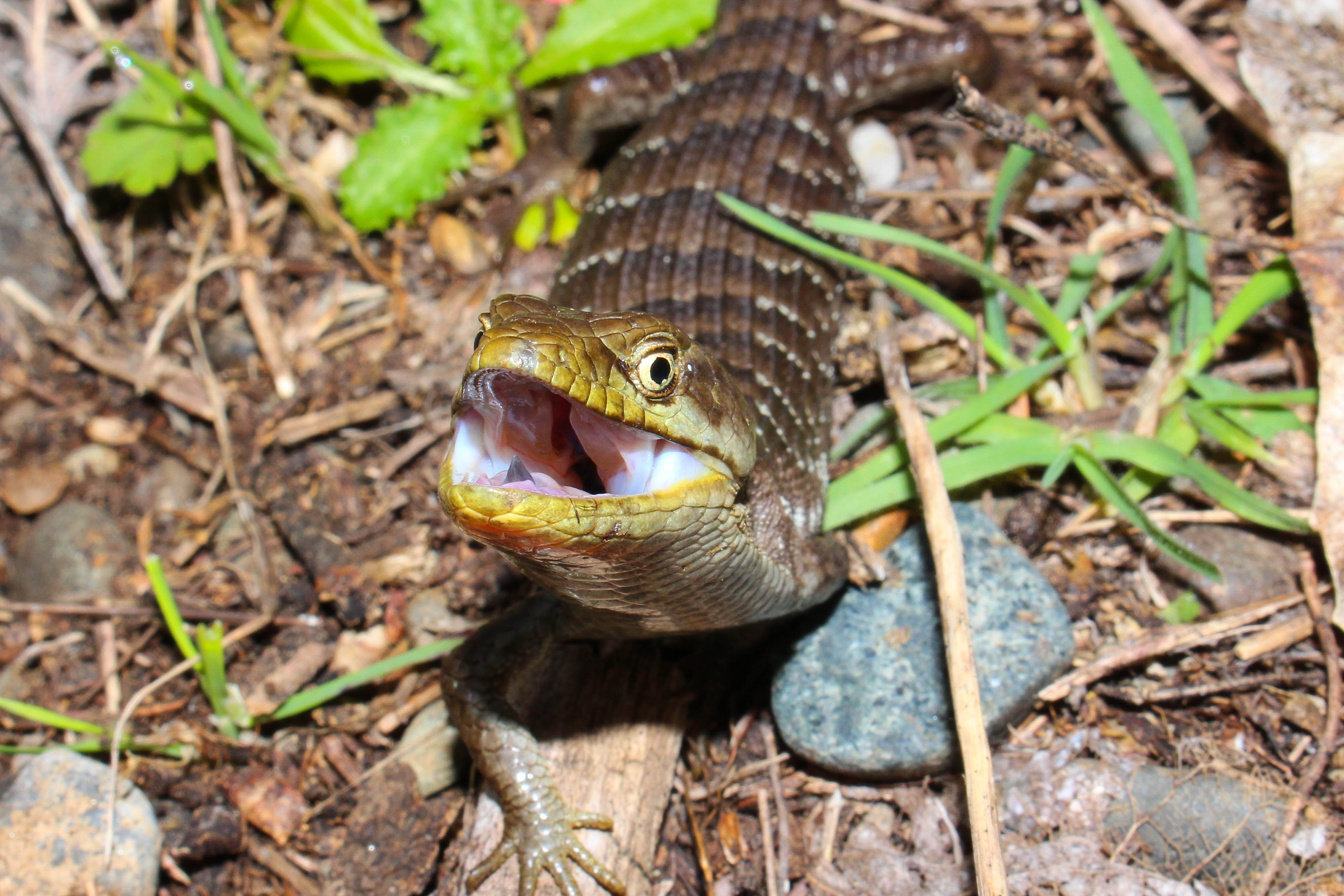
Defensive display

The southern alligator lizard frequently can be found near human habitation, and is often seen foraging in the mornings and evenings. It is often found in or around suburban yards and garages. E. multicarinata is notable for its vicious self-defense, and will bite and defecate if handled.

Mating occurs in spring, typically from April to May, though in warmer regions this species will breed year-round. Eggs are usually laid between May and June and hatch during late summer and early fall. Females lay two clutches of eggs per year, often in decaying wood or plant matter to keep them warm. Females will guard the eggs until they hatch.

== See also ==
- Northern alligator lizard
