= Gerrhonotus lazcanoi =

Scientific classification
- Kingdom: Animalia
- Phylum: Chordata
- Class: Reptilia
- Order: Squamata
- Suborder: Anguimorpha
- Family: Anguidae
- Genus: Gerrhonotus
- Species: G. lazcanoi

Binomial name
- Gerrhonotus lazcanoi Banda-Leal, Nevárez-de los Reyes, & Bryson, Jr,. 2017

Species of lizard

Gerrhonotus lazcanoi is a species of lizard of the Anguidae family. It is found in Mexico.
