= Avery Judd Skilton =

American physician (1802–1858)

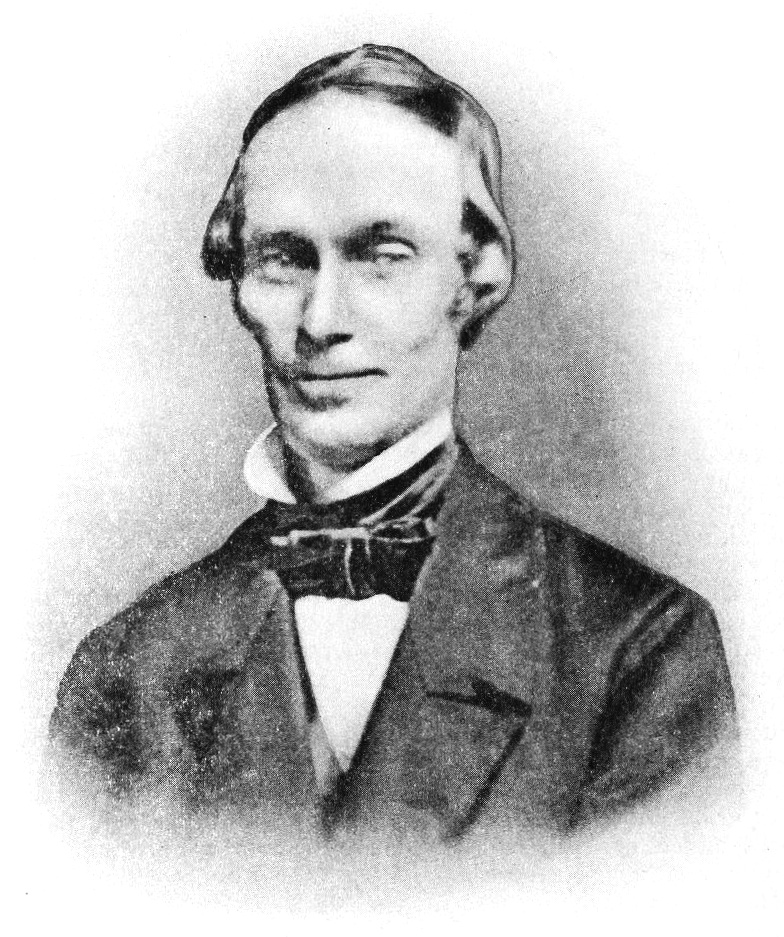

Avery Judd Skilton M.D. (February 1, 1802 – March 22, 1858) was an American medical doctor and naturalist who practiced medicine in Troy, New York, for 30 years. He was also a curator at the Troy Lyceum of Natural History, studying mineralogy, geology, botany, conchology, and paleontology, and in his later years pursued genealogy.

Skilton was born in Watertown, Connecticut, the second son of James and Chloe (Steele) Skilton. He attended Yale Medical College. from 1826 to 1827. He commenced the practice of medicine in Troy in the year 1827, and continued it until December 10, 1857, when incapacitated by illness. In addition to medical practice, he pursued natural history, philology, and genealogy. Results of his genealogical efforts were published posthumously in Steele Family: A Genealogical History of John and George Steele and Their Descendants.

His contributions to herpetology include the descriptions of the rough-skinned newt (Taricha granulosa) and Oregon alligator lizard (Elgaria multicarinata scincicauda) in 1849. He was a correspondent of biologist Spencer Fullerton Baird, often sending him specimens. Skilton is commemorated in the scientific name of the western skink (Plestiodon skiltonianus).
