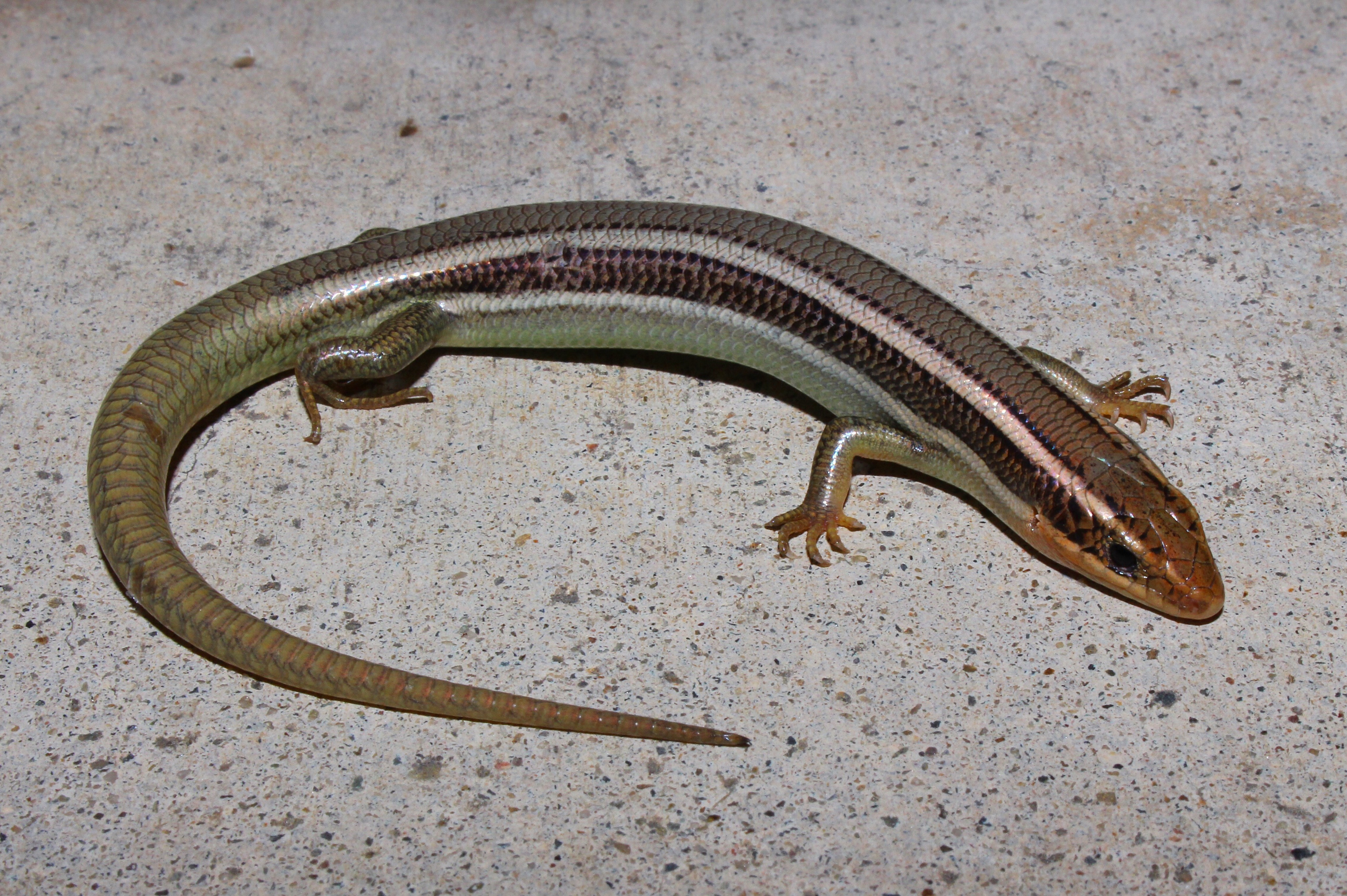

Conservation status
- Least Concern (IUCN 3.1)

Scientific classification
- Kingdom: Animalia
- Phylum: Chordata
- Class: Reptilia
- Order: Squamata
- Family: Scincidae
- Genus: Plestiodon
- Species: P. skiltonianus

Binomial name
- Plestiodon skiltonianus Baird & Girard, 1852
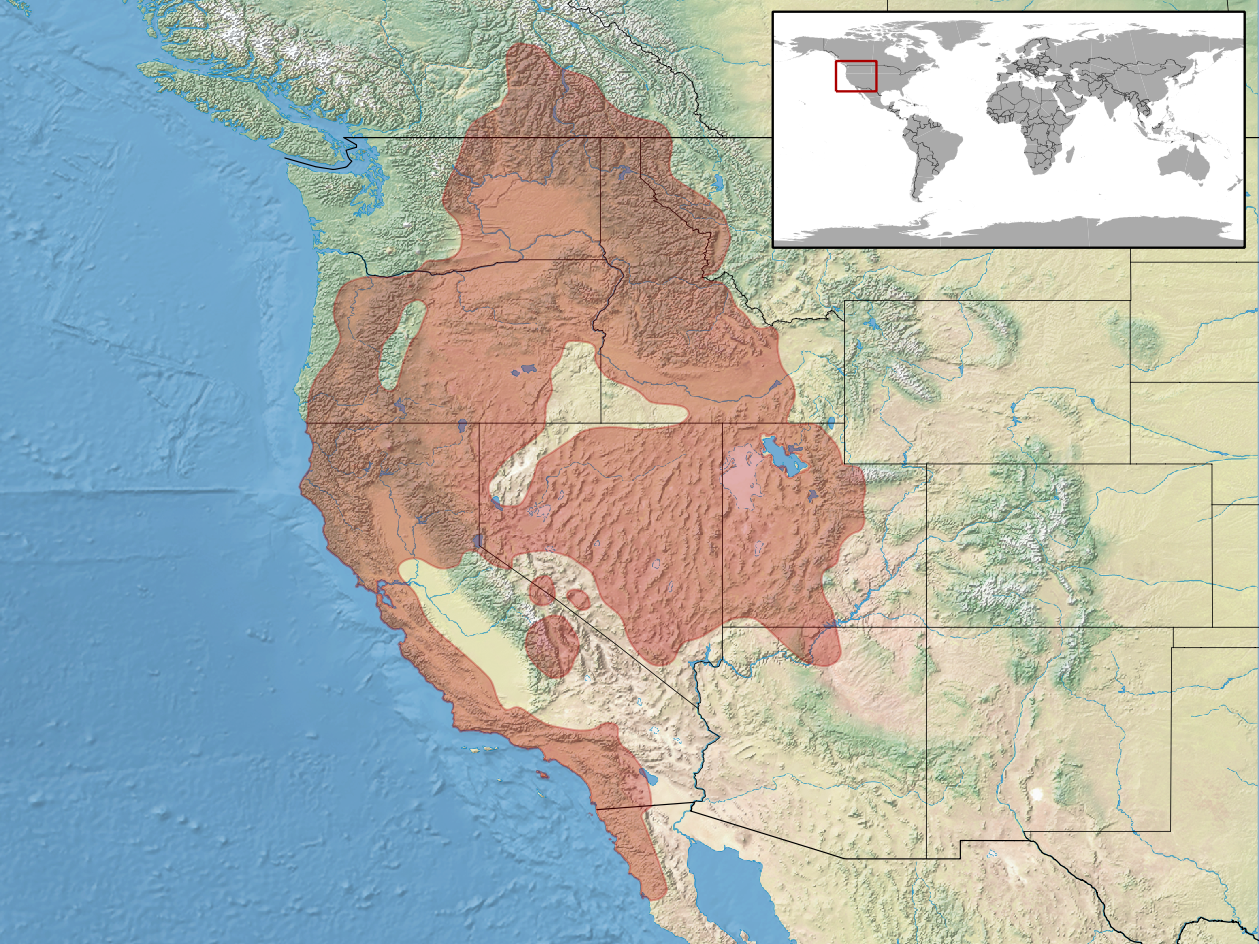

Synonyms
- Plestiodon skiltonianum Baird & Girard, 1852; Eumeces skiltonianus — Cope, 1875; Plestiodon skiltonianus — Schmitz et al., 2004

= Western skink =

Species of lizard

The western skink (Plestiodon skiltonianus) is a species of small, smooth-scaled lizard with relatively small limbs. It measures about 100 to 210 mm (about 4 to 8.25 inches) in total length (body + tail). It is one of six species of lizards in Canada. They spend much of their day basking in the sun. Their diet ranges widely, including spiders and beetles. Western skinks will bite if grasped and will flee if they feel threatened. It is a common but secretive species whose range extends from southern British Columbia and throughout Washington, Oregon, Nevada, Utah, Idaho, and Wyoming and into western Montana and northern Arizona and Missouri. They can also live in some areas of Texas It is widespread in northern California but primarily restricted to the coast in central and southern California. Found in a variety of habitats, this lizard is most common in early successional stages or open areas of late successional stages. Heavy brush and densely forested areas are generally avoided. Western skinks are found from sea level to at least 2,130 m (7,000 ft). This diurnal reptile is active during the warm seasons.

== Taxonomy ==
Initially described in 1852 by Baird and Girard, the Western skink is named for Dr. Avery Judd Skilton (1802–1858), an American physician and naturalist, who collected the first specimens. Together with Gilbert's skink (P. gilberti), the San Lucan skink (P. lagunensis), and the four-lined Asiatic skink (P. quadrilineatus), the western skink belongs to the so-called "skiltonianus group". The exact taxonomy within this group has yet to be conclusively determined, and may need revision following DNA analysis research.

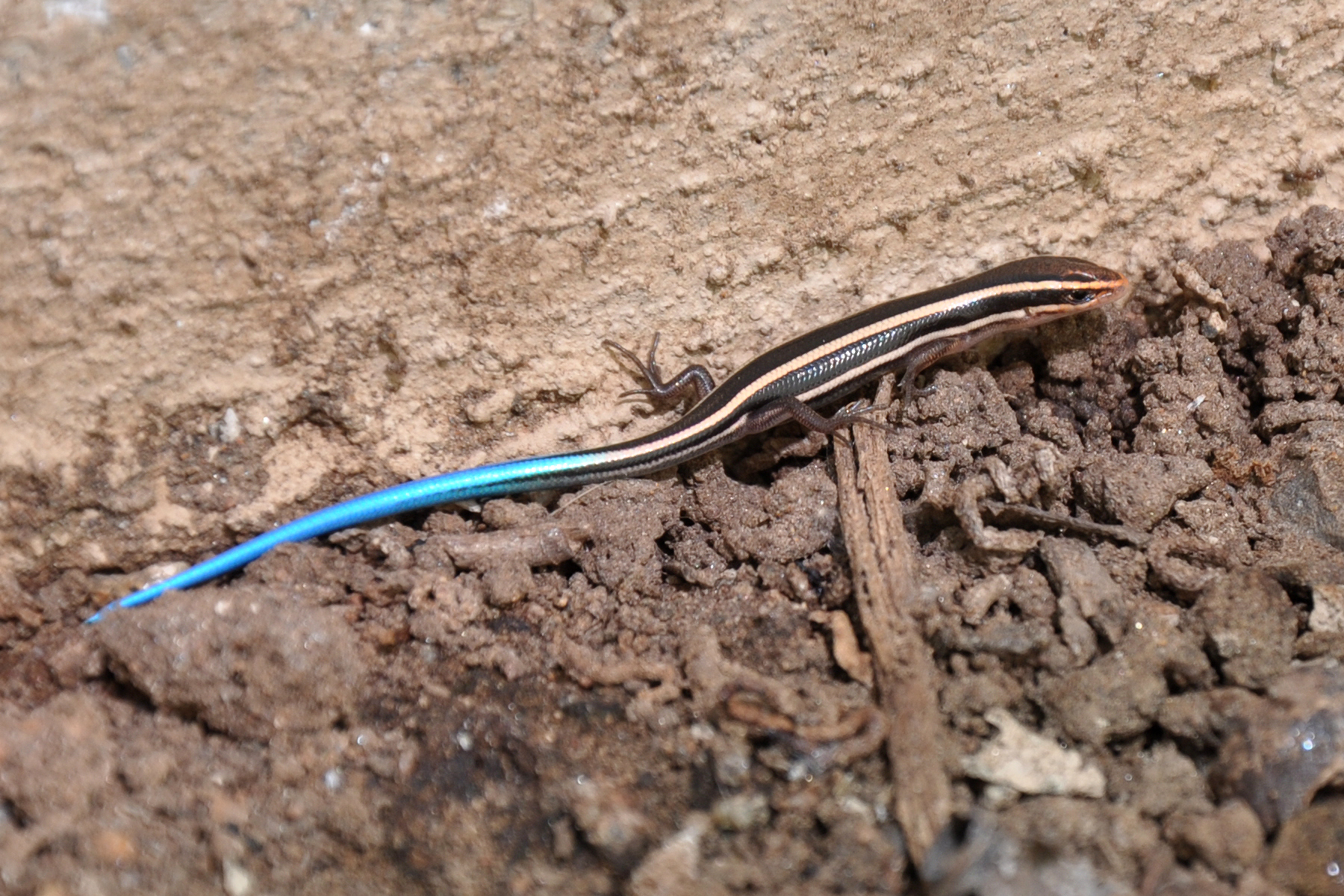
Coronado skink (Plestiodon skiltonianus interparietalis)

There are three recognized subspecies, including the nominotypical subspecies:

- Coronado skink, P.s. interparietalis (W. Tanner, 1957)
  Occurs in southern California and Baja California, Mexico.
- Great Basin skink, P.s. utahensis (W. Tanner, 1957)
  Occurs in Utah.
- Skilton's skink, P.s. skiltonianus Baird & Girard, 1852

The most common is Skilton's skink, which occurs throughout the western United States west of the Rocky Mountains and in southern British Columbia, Canada.

== Behavior ==
The western skink is a secretive and very agile lizard that forages actively through leaf litter and dense vegetation, preying upon small invertebrates including spiders, a variety of insects and sow bugs. Crickets, beetles, moths, grasshoppers, and other arthropods have been found in the stomachs of skinks. Prey is sometimes stalked and cannibalism has been reported. It is a good burrower and sometimes constructs burrows several times its own body length.

Females take great care of their eggs. Western skink females construct nest chambers that are several centimeters deep in loose moist soil. Typically these chambers are located under surface objects, especially flat stones, logs, and sometimes in or near rock outcrops. The females remain guarding the nest until the young leave the nest. Female western skinks will defend their nests from predators, repair their nests, and even bask in the sun and then return to the nest to provide additional heat.

== Habitat ==
Found in a variety of habitats from sea level to at least 2,130 m (7,000 ft), the western skink is commonest in early successional stages or open areas within habitats in which it occurs. Heavy brush and densely forested areas are generally avoided. The western skink seems to prefer a somewhat moist environment, although it can also be found on dry hillsides. Frequents grassland, broken chaparral, pinon-juniper and juniper-sage woodland, and open pine-oak and pine forests. The soil of its nest chambers is invariably moist. Standing water is apparently not required.

Although western skinks avoid forests, they are found in dry areas within forested areas.

== Description ==
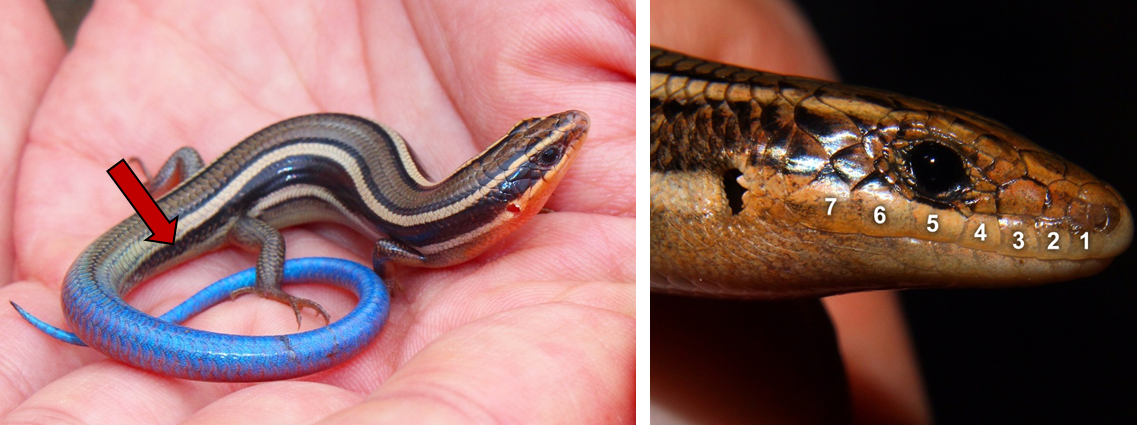
Western skinks can be distinguished from similar species by a broad brown or black band originating on the side of head and extending past the hind legs (left). They also possess seven supralabial scales (right).

Adult western skinks have a broad brown stripe down their backs, edged with black and bordered on each side by a conspicuous whitish to beige dorsolateral stripe that begins on nose and extends over the eye and back alongside body onto the tail. A second pale stripe, starting on upper jaw, occurs low on each side and is separated from the first by a broad dark brown or black band originating on the side of head and usually extending well out onto the tail, though this band can be disrupted if the tail is lost and regrown. Juvenile skink's tails are bright blue, turning to grey in adulthood. In the breeding season reddish or orange color appears on the side of head and chin, and occasionally on the sides, tip, and underside of the tail. They usually have seven supralabial scales and four enlarged nuchals. Young skinks' colorations are more vivid than those of adults.

== Distribution ==
Western skinks can be found from southern British Columbia, Canada, to the tip of the Baja California Peninsula, and throughout most of Great Basin to extreme Northern Arizona; central Utah to the Pacific Coast. The species is apparently absent from the floor of San Joaquin Valley (they have been observed in rural areas of southeast Lodi, CA), central Sierra Nevada (except a few scattered locations in the foothills where they are very common), and lowland deserts of California. In Northern Baja California the species occurs in the northwestern part at least as far south as Colonia Guerro and in the south in the cape and Comondu regions, Santa Agueda, and San Francisco de la Sierra. They have been observed on Santa Catalina, Los Coronados, and Todos Santos Island off the coast of California.

== Predators and defensive behavior ==
Western skinks risk predation by virtually all mammalian, avian, and reptilian predators. In Idaho, their predators include night snakes, striped whipsnakes, and raptors. Throughout their range, they may be targeted by a range of predators, especially young animals honing their hunting skills, including black bear cubs, bobcats, coyotes, gray, red and swift foxes, least weasels and pumas, as well as domestic and feral cats and dogs. Various carnivorous birds, especially younger or smaller individuals, may hunt these skinks, such as Cooper's hawk, Harris hawks, kestrels, red-tailed hawks and shrikes ('butcherbirds'). Reptilian predators include kingsnakes and any other reptile-consuming squamates.

Against predators, a skink's automative response is to retreat. If females are protecting their eggs, they may attempt to bite to scare off any predators. Young western skinks have a bright blue tail with color that fades with age. Skinks can perform autotomy; if seized by a predator its tail is deliberately cast and wriggles violently attracting attention while the lizard may escape. The tail will grow back with time but is often darker in color and misshapen. It will play dead, but this behavior is rarely seen.

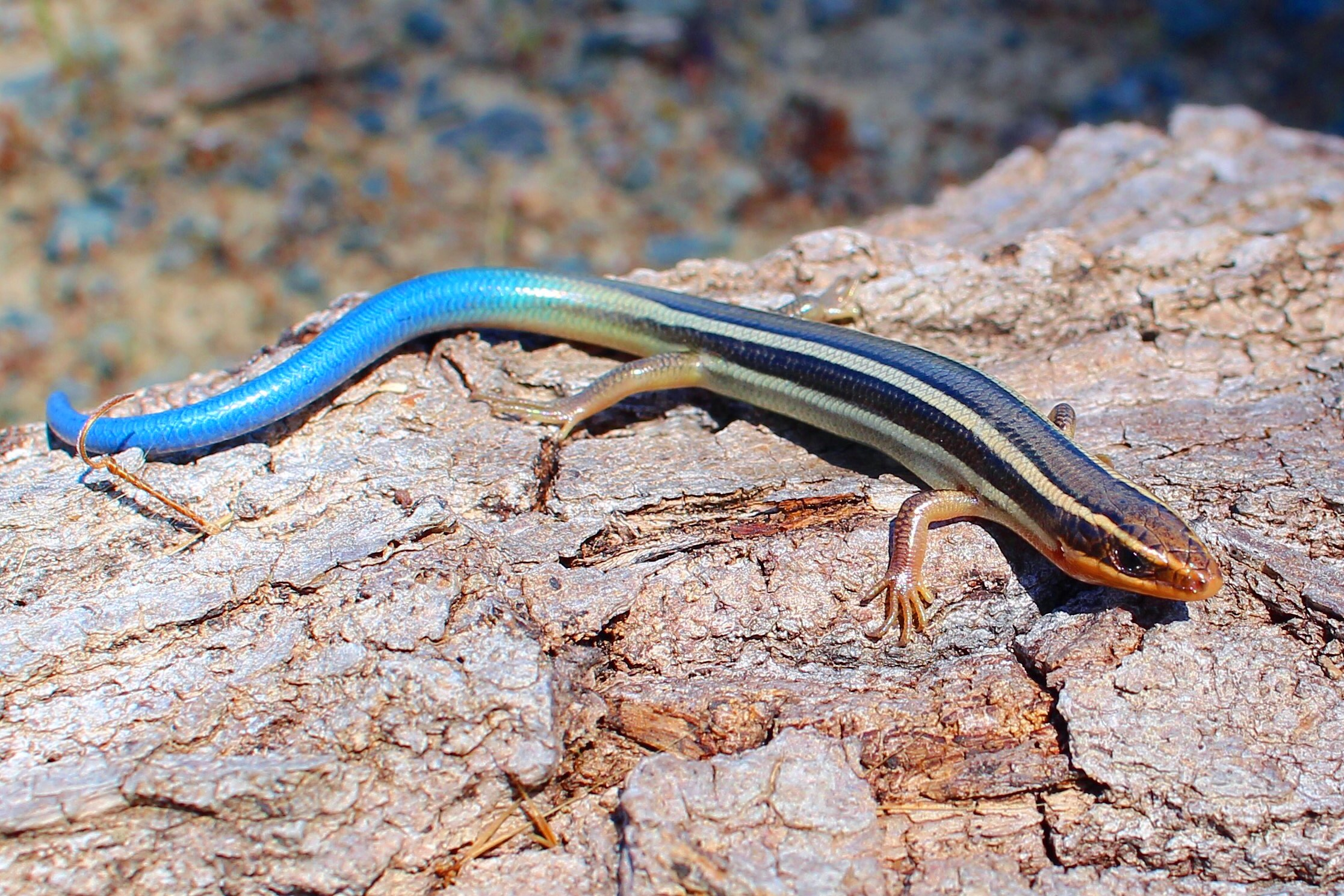
Juvenile western skink

== Life history ==
This skink is diurnal during the period of warm-season activity. During summer most activity is concentrated in the morning and late afternoon. Where summer temperatures are not extreme, activity extends throughout the day. Adult skinks usually become inactive by early fall but juveniles extend their period of activity several weeks. The length of time they are inactive varies depending on the climate of the area. During their hibernation period, western skinks remain in communal dens.

The reproductive season for this species varies geographically and from year to year depending on local conditions. Mating probably occurs in the spring soon after emergence. Males turn orange on the underside when they are breeding. Females lay 2–6 eggs during June and July.

Western skinks' eggs hatch in the months of July and August; the exact time differs by geographic location. They reach sexual maturity at around 3 years, and live up to 9 years.
