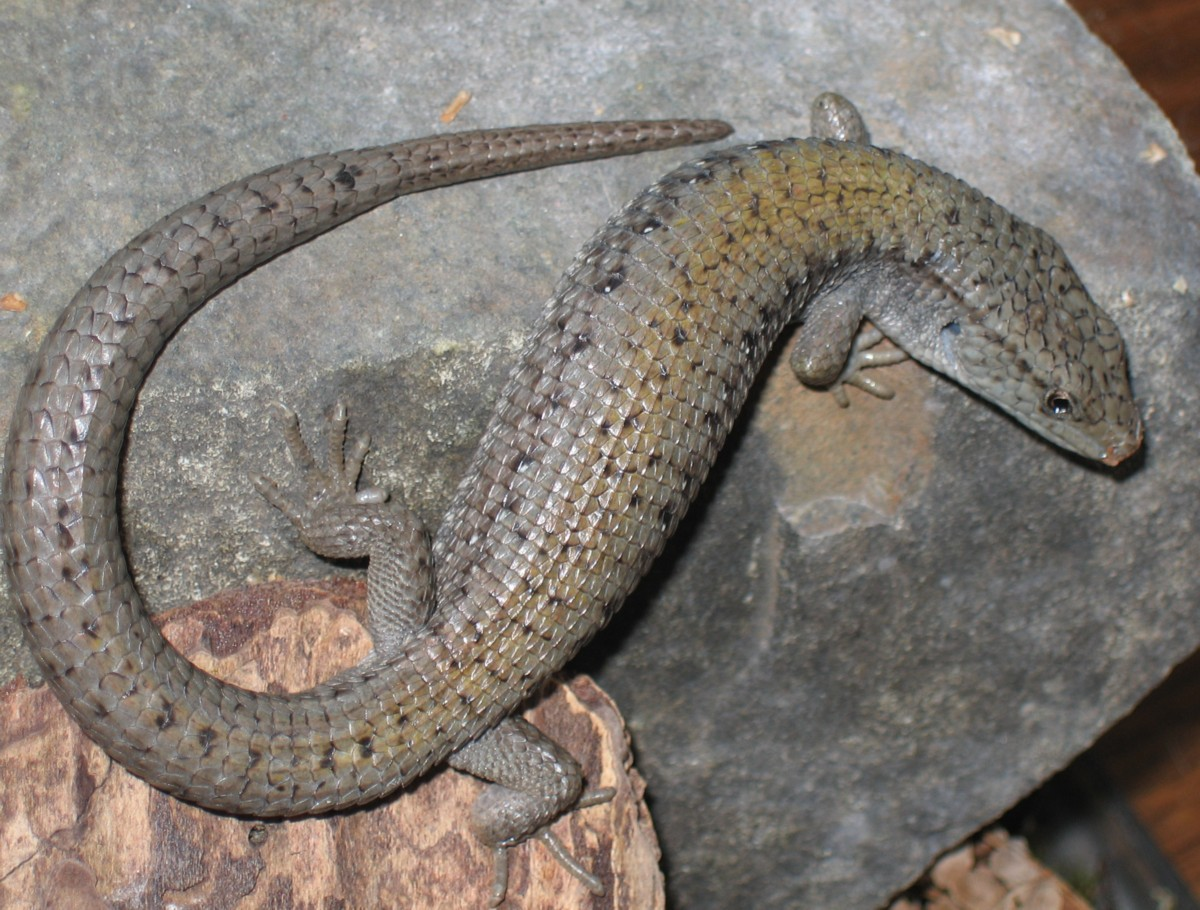
- Elgaria coerulea

Conservation status
- Least Concern (IUCN 3.1)

Scientific classification
- Kingdom: Animalia
- Phylum: Chordata
- Class: Reptilia
- Order: Squamata
- Suborder: Anguimorpha
- Family: Anguidae
- Genus: Elgaria
- Species: E. coerulea

Binomial name
- Elgaria coerulea (Wiegmann, 1828)

Synonyms
- Gerrhonotus coeruleus Wiegmann, 1828; Gerrhonotus burnetti Gray, 1831; Gerrhonotus cæruleus — Boulenger, 1885 (misspelling)

= Northern alligator lizard =

Species of lizard

The northern alligator lizard (Elgaria coerulea) is a species of medium-sized lizard in the family Anguidae. The species is native to the North American west coast. There are four recognized subspecies.

== Taxonomy ==
The northern alligator lizard was formerly known by the scientific name of Gerrhonotus coeruleus (Wiegmann, 1828), but more recently has been assigned to the genus Elgaria.

== Subspecies ==
Four subspecies are recognized as being valid, including the nominotypical subspecies.

- Elgaria coerulea coerulea (Wiegmann, 1828) – San Francisco alligator lizard
- Elgaria coerulea palmeri (Stejneger, 1893) – Sierra alligator lizard
- Elgaria coerulea principis (Baird & Girard, 1852) – Northwestern alligator lizard
- Elgaria coerulea shastensis (Fitch, 1934) – Shasta alligator lizard

A trinomial authority in parentheses indicates that the subspecies was originally described in a genus other than Elgaria.

The subspecies E. c. principis is one of seven species of lizards in Canada.

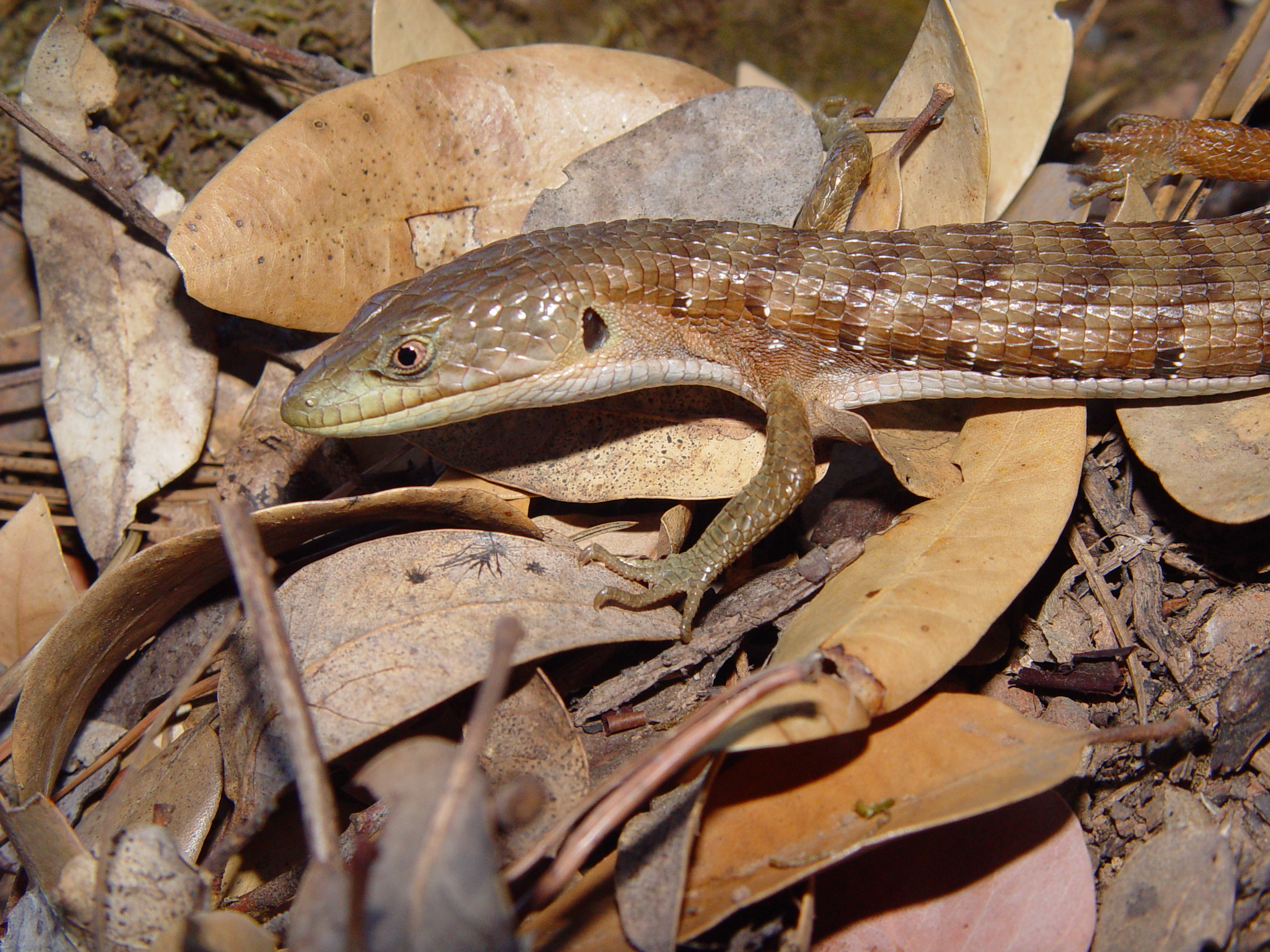
E. coerulea shastensis

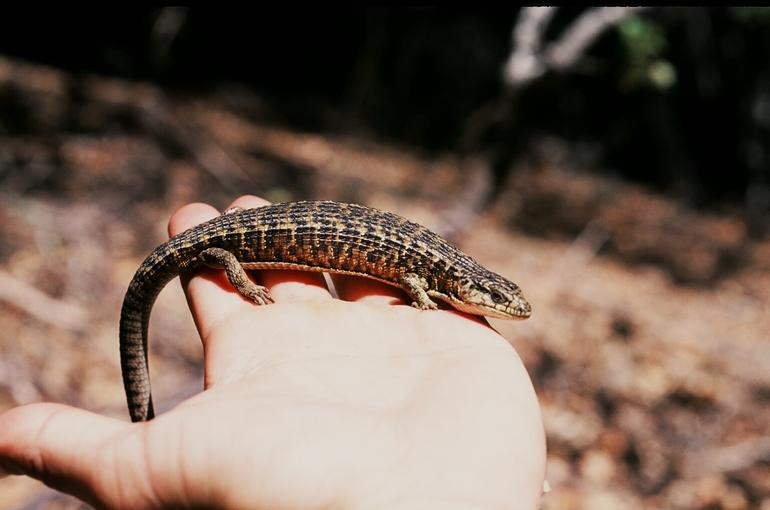
E. c. coerulea

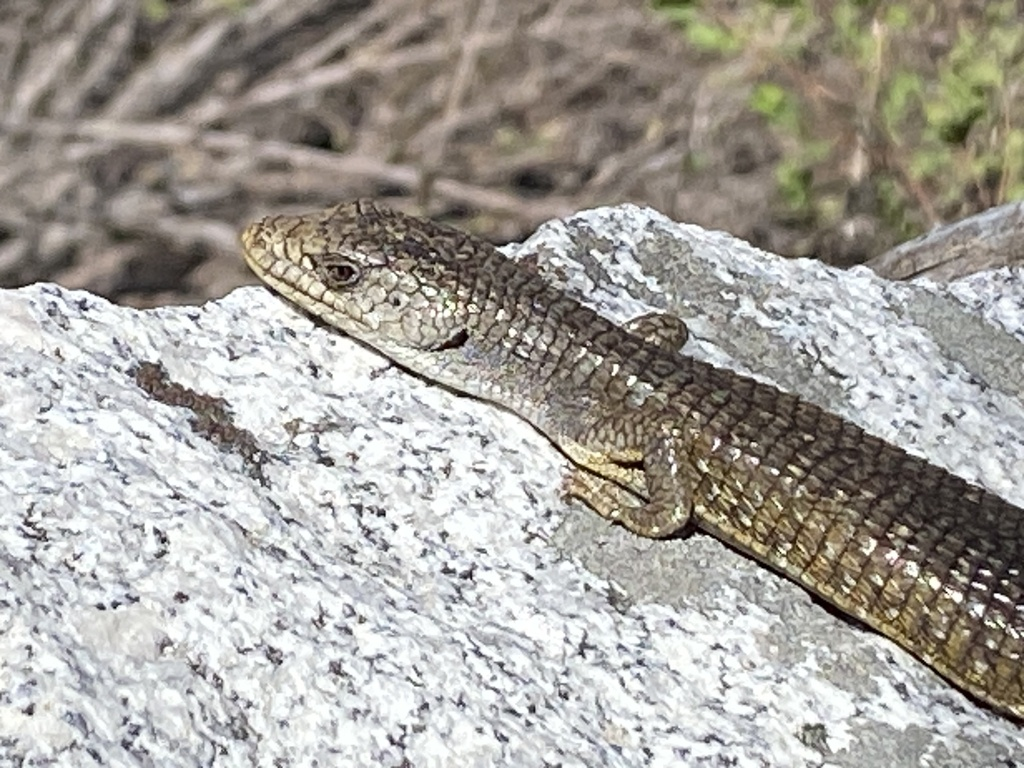
E. coerulea palmeri

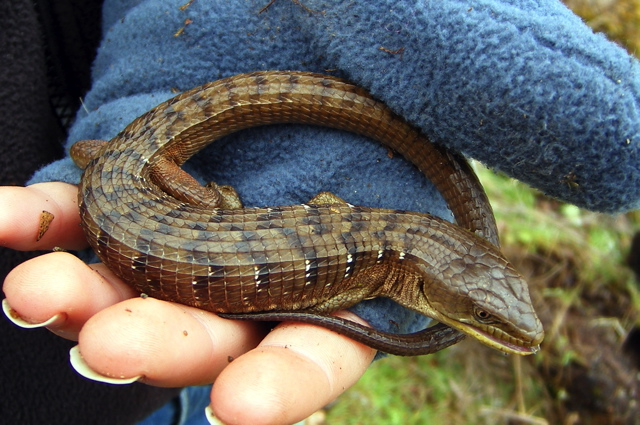
E. coerulea

== Etymology ==
The subspecific name, palmeri, is in honor of American zoologist Theodore Sherman Palmer.

== Description ==
The northern alligator lizard is a medium-sized slender lizard. Adults reach a snout-to-vent length (SVL) of about 10 cm (3.9 in) and a total length (tailincluded tail) of roughly 27.5 cm (10.8 in). It has a distinct skin fold on each side, separating the keeled scales on the back from the smooth ventral scales. The skin varies in color, but can be brown and white, or greenish yellow and brown. Dorsally, E. coerulea is brownish in color and often has dark blotches that sometimes blend together into bands. The throat and mouth area of some young individuals can be yellow. The belly is light gray. The eyes are dark.

== Diet ==
The typical diet of Elgaria coerulea includes crickets, slugs, beetles, spiders, and moths, but it will also take larger prey, such as small lizards, and will even eat small baby mice if given the opportunity.

== Reproduction ==
The northern alligator lizard is live-bearing, producing up to 15 young (typically 4–5), between June and September. During the spring breeding season, a male lizard grasps the head of a female with his mouth until she is ready to let him mate with her. They can remain attached this way for many hours, almost oblivious to their surroundings. Besides keeping her from running off to mate with another male, this probably shows her how strong and suitable a mate he is.

== Distribution ==
Ranges of
- E. c. coerulea,
- E. c. palmeri,
- E. c. principis, and
- E. c. shastensis.

The northern alligator lizard occurs along the Pacific Coast and in the Rocky Mountains from southern British Columbia through Washington, northern Idaho and western Montana south through Oregon to the coastal range and the Sierra Nevada in central California. As the map shows, the different subspecies have quite different geographic ranges, with E. c. principis being the most widely distributed, whereas E. c. coerulea occurs mainly around the San Francisco area but is also found farther north into Humboldt County.

The species is widely distributed along the Pacific coast and can be found from sea level up to elevation of about 3,350 m (10,990 ft). It is found in a variety of forested habitats and montane chaparral.

== Brumation ==
As winter sets in, colder temperatures force the northern alligator lizard to undergo brumation. Brumation allows it to reduce caloric usage and retain body heat during winter. Often, the northern alligator lizard may choose to hide under rocks, though logs and burrows are occasionally used, to undergo this process.

== See also ==
- Southern alligator lizard
