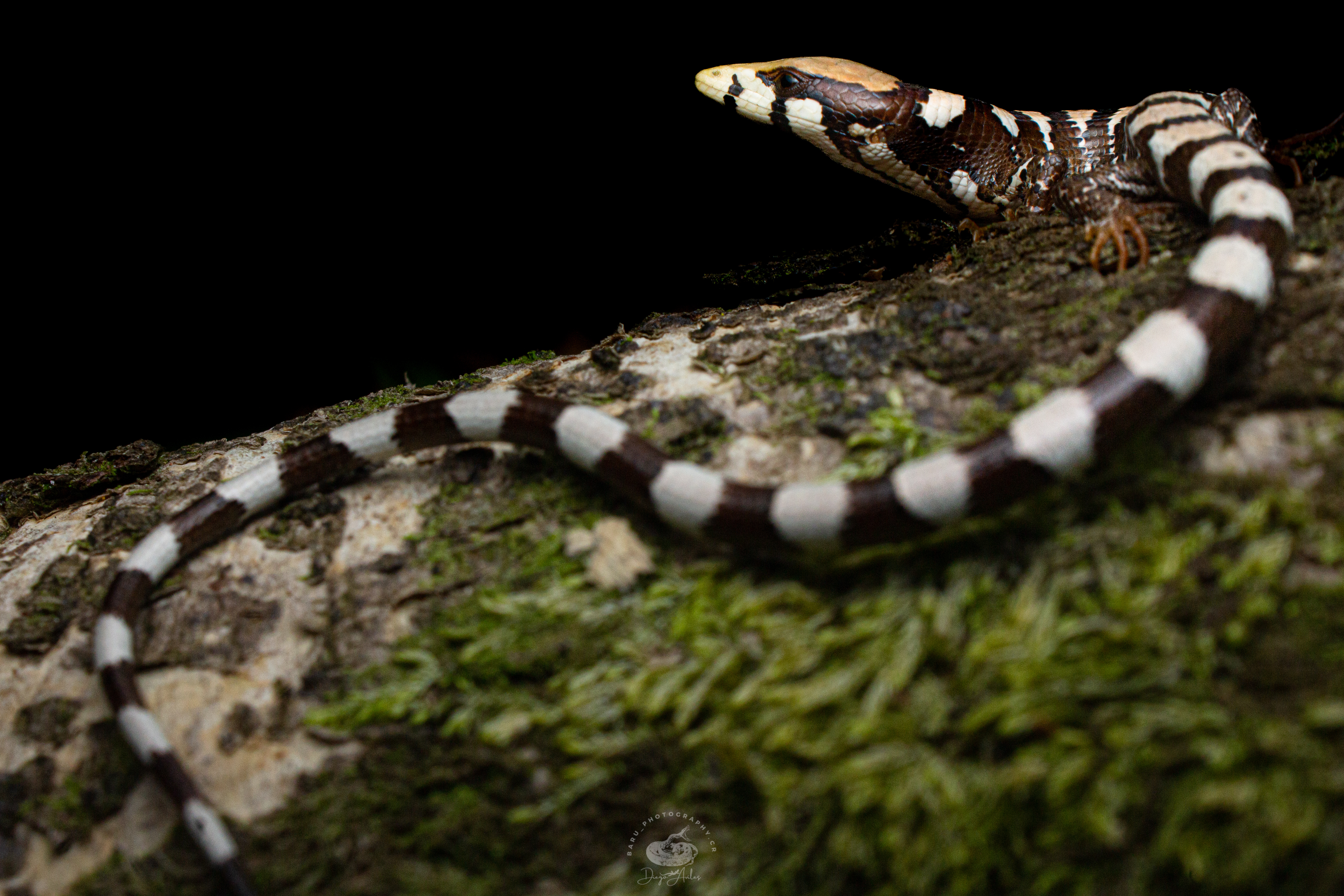

Conservation status
- Data Deficient (IUCN 3.1)

Scientific classification
- Kingdom: Animalia
- Phylum: Chordata
- Class: Reptilia
- Order: Squamata
- Suborder: Anguimorpha
- Family: Anguidae
- Genus: Gerrhonotus
- Species: G. rhombifer

Binomial name
- Gerrhonotus rhombifer (W. Peters, 1876)

Synonyms
- Gerrhonotus rhombifer W. Peters, 1876; Coloptychon rhombifer (W. Peters, 1876)

= Isthmian alligator lizard =

Species of lizard

The isthmian alligator lizard (Gerrhonotus rhombifer) is a species of lizard of the Anguidae family. G. rhombifer is found in both Costa Rica and Panama. Unlike many lizards near its habitat, individuals have lateral folds. They give birth to live young. Gerrhonotus rhombifer had not been seen for fifty years, prior to being rediscovered in 2000 near Golfito, and is one of the rarest species of lizard in Costa Rica.

== Description ==
G. rhombifer is a broad-headed, long-bodied lizard, which is similar to Diploglossus monotropis. An adult measures from 35–50 centimetres (14–20 in) in total length, with the tail making up approximately two-thirds of the total length. The upper surface of the body is tan in color with black-edged brown crossbands, and does not have either orange or red markings. C. rhombifer is short-limbed, and has movable eyelids. A well-defined lateral fold, covering small scales, separates the ridges and rows of scales on the belly. The only other species of lizards in Costa Rica that also have lateral folds are of the genus Mesapis.

The isthmian alligator lizard is viviparous, meaning that as with mammals, the females bear live young.

== Distribution and habitat ==
The isthmian alligator lizard lives in the lowland rainforests of Costa Rica, and in western Panama. G. rhombifer can mostly be found on land, but has also been found living in trees.
