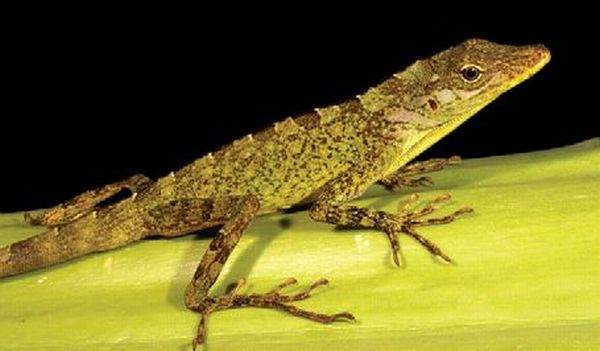

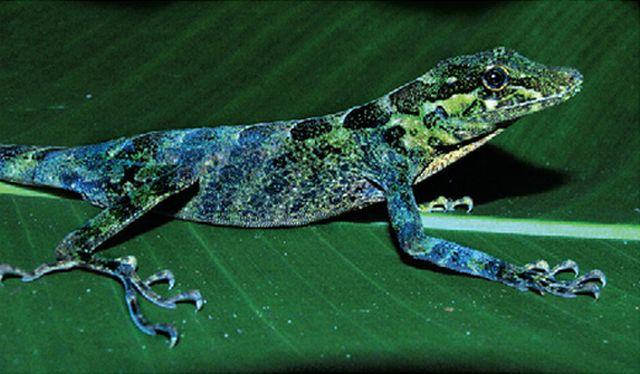
- Male (top), female (bottom)

Conservation status
- Least Concern (IUCN 3.1)

Scientific classification
- Kingdom: Animalia
- Phylum: Chordata
- Class: Reptilia
- Order: Squamata
- Suborder: Iguania
- Family: Dactyloidae
- Genus: Anolis
- Species: A. fitchi

Binomial name
- Anolis fitchi Williams & Duellman, 1984

= Anolis fitchi =

Species of lizard

Anolis fitchi, Fitch's anole, is a species of lizard in the family Dactyloidae, named for American herpetologist Henry S. Fitch. The species is found in Colombia and Ecuador.

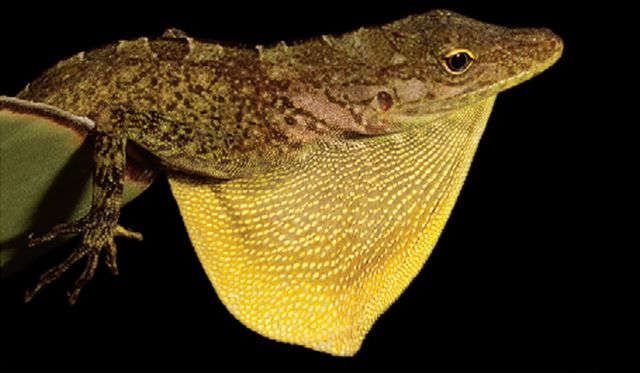
Male dewlap

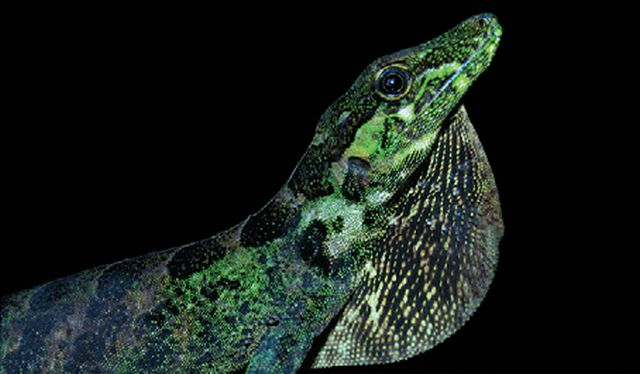
Female dewlap

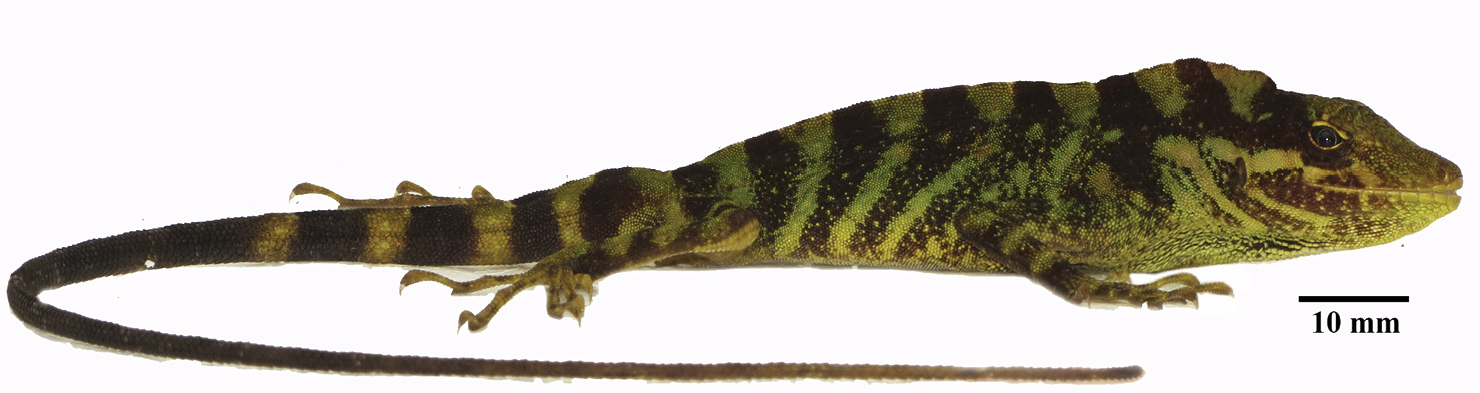
Male
