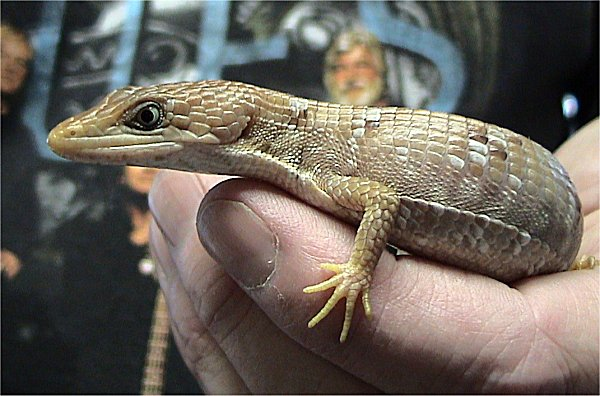
- Texas Alligator Lizard, Gerrhonotus infernalis

Conservation status
- Least Concern (IUCN 3.1)

Scientific classification
- Kingdom: Animalia
- Phylum: Chordata
- Class: Reptilia
- Order: Squamata
- Suborder: Anguimorpha
- Family: Anguidae
- Genus: Gerrhonotus
- Species: G. infernalis

Binomial name
- Gerrhonotus infernalis Baird, 1859
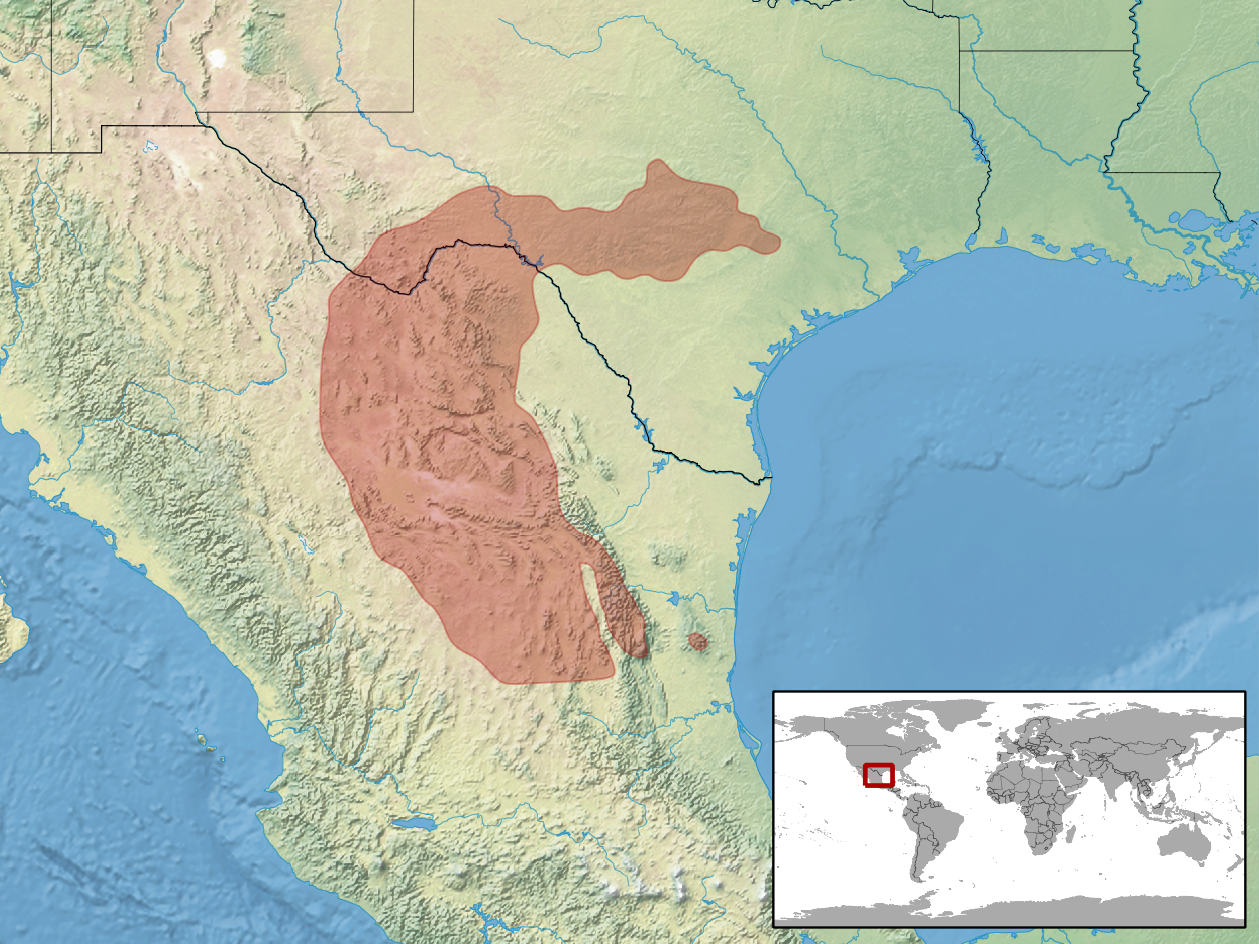

Synonyms
- Gerrhonotus infernalis Baird, 1859; Gerrhonotus liocephalus infernalis — Cope, 1900; Gerrhonotus infernalis — Good, 1994

= Gerrhonotus infernalis =

Texas alligator lizard

Species of lizard

The Texas alligator lizard (Gerrhonotus infernalis) is a species of lizard in the subfamily Gerrhonotinae of the family Anguidae. The species is endemic to the central region of the American state of Texas, and south into adjacent northern Mexico.

== Description ==
The Texas alligator lizard is a medium-sized lizard, attaining a maximum total length (including tail) of around 24 to 25 in (61 to 64 cm). It is the largest lizard species in Texas, and one of the largest alligator lizards in the world. This lizard has a flat, wedge-shaped head. Its body is generally a yellow-brown color, often with darker brown and white checker patterning on its dorsal surfaces, and uniformly light-colored, white, or grey on its ventral surfaces. Its scales are very stiff and plate-like. It has short limbs, and a tail that can fall off to distract a potential predator, but will regrow in time.

Errhonotine lizards are known for their broad heads, short limbs and being heavily armored with scales, from which the common name alligator lizard derived. Gerrhonotus liocephalus, in particular, can be easily recognized by 16 longitudinal rows of dorsal scales and 46 to 54 dorsal scales from the occiput to the base of the tail (Brown 1950). Osteologically, it has supranasal expansion, prefrontal-superciliary contact, a single preocular, loss of one canthal/loreal element, and two temporals contacting the orbit (Good 1988). The color pattern of this species undergoes considerable change with age. Hatchlings are a deep metallic brown with well-defined white crossbands (Bartlett 1999). Adult color pattern ranges from a tan yellowish to a reddish brown with eight to ten lighter crossbands on the dorsum that are weakly edged with brown. The head and ventrum are unmarked with the tail being similar to the dorsum. Crossbands on aged specimens are vague. Texas Alligator Lizard hatchlings are around four inches in length, and can reach up to 20 inches in length at full maturity (Bevans 1956).

== Behavior ==
The Texas alligator lizard is a relatively slow, diurnal lizard, with quite good vision. Though not generally aggressive, it may bite if handled, and is incorrectly considered to be venomous by many cultures.

== Habitat ==
G. infernalis is often found on rocky hillsides, where it hides among the stones or in limestone crevices. Though uncommonly seen in its most suitable habitats, Gerrhonotus liocephalus has a range from the Edwards Plateau of Central Texas, south throughout low-mid elevations in eastern Mexico.

== Diet ==
The primary diet of G. infernalis is insects and other invertebrates, but it may sometimes prey on nestling birds or rodents.

== Reproduction ==
Breeding occurs year-round; sometimes, multiple clutches of eggs are laid per year. Females will often stay near the nesting site to protect it, but no parental care occurs once the young alligator lizards hatch. The young generally have more striking markings, and are only about 3–4 in (7.6–10.2 cm) long (including tail).
