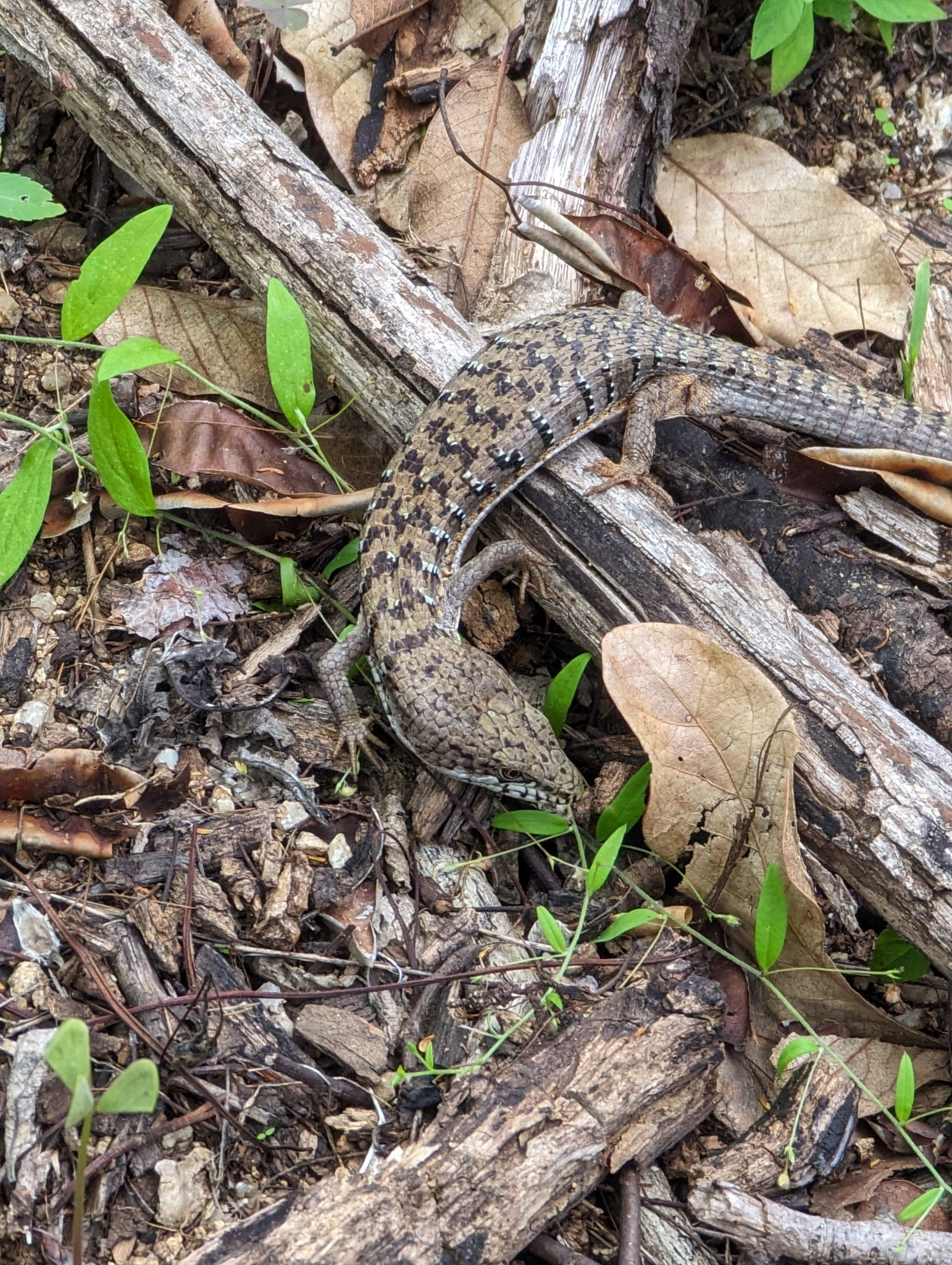

Conservation status
- Least Concern (IUCN 3.1)

Scientific classification
- Kingdom: Animalia
- Phylum: Chordata
- Class: Reptilia
- Order: Squamata
- Suborder: Anguimorpha
- Family: Anguidae
- Genus: Elgaria
- Species: E. paucicarinata

Binomial name
- Elgaria paucicarinata (Fitch, 1934)
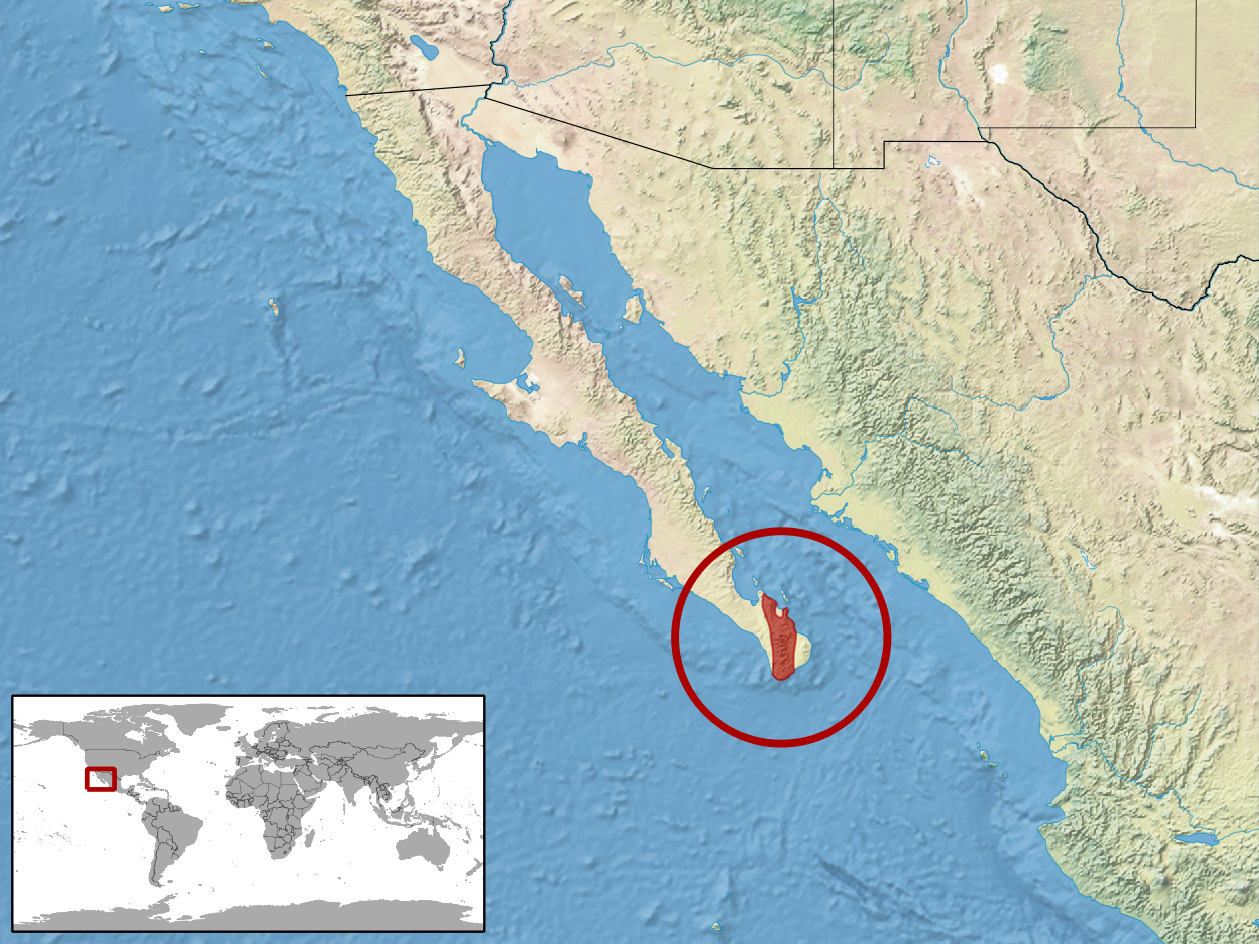

= Elgaria paucicarinata =

Species of lizard

The San Lucan alligator lizard (Elgaria paucicarinata) is a species of medium-sized lizard in the family Anguidae. The species is endemic to Mexico.
