= Elgaria velazquezi =

Conservation status
- Least Concern (IUCN 3.1)

Scientific classification
- Kingdom: Animalia
- Phylum: Chordata
- Class: Reptilia
- Order: Squamata
- Suborder: Anguimorpha
- Family: Anguidae
- Genus: Elgaria
- Species: E. velazquezi

Binomial name
- Elgaria velazquezi Grismer & Hollingsworth, 2001
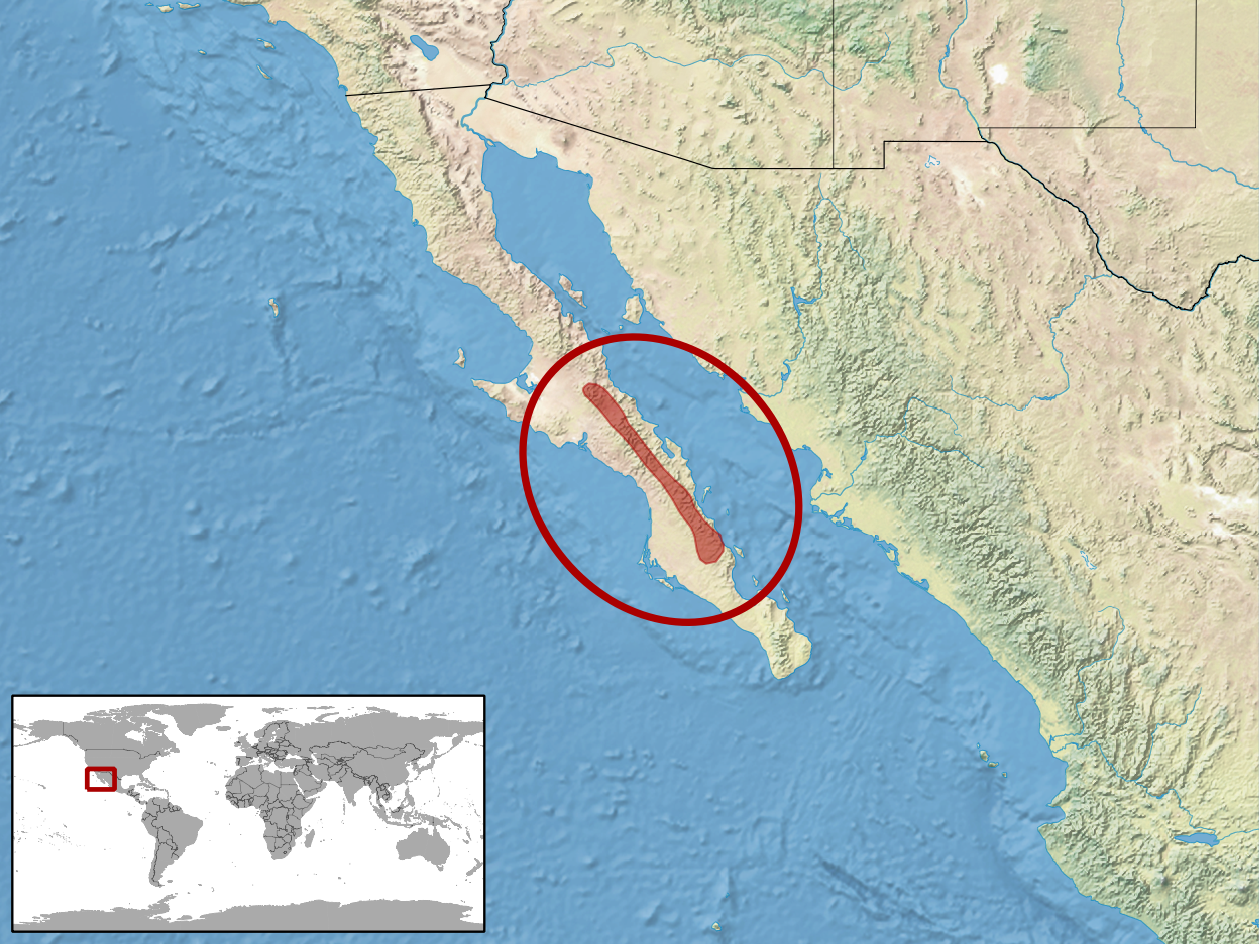

Species of lizard

The central peninsular alligator lizard (Elgaria velazquezi) is a species of medium-sized lizard in the family Anguidae. The species is endemic to Mexico.
