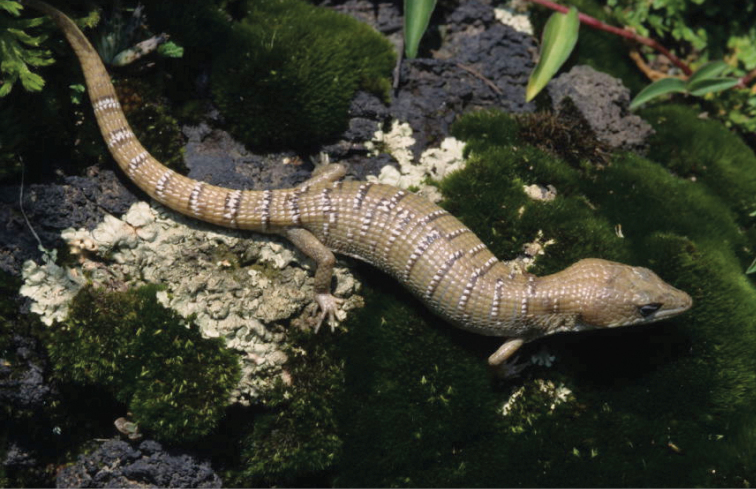

Conservation status
- Least Concern (IUCN 3.1)

Scientific classification
- Kingdom: Animalia
- Phylum: Chordata
- Class: Reptilia
- Order: Squamata
- Suborder: Anguimorpha
- Family: Anguidae
- Genus: Gerrhonotus
- Species: G. lugoi

Binomial name
- Gerrhonotus lugoi C.J. McCoy, 1970

Synonyms
- Barisia lugoi (C.J. McCoy, 1970); Desertum lugoi (C.J. McCoy, 1970)

= Gerrhonotus lugoi =

Species of lizard

Gerrhonotus lugoi, also known commonly as Lugo's alligator lizard and la lagartija escorpion de Lugo in Mexican Spanish, is a species of lizard in the subfamily Gerrhonotinae of the family Anguidae. The species is endemic to Mexico.

== Etymology ==
The specific name, lugoi, is in honor of José "Pepe" Lugo Guajardo of Cuatro Ciénegas, Mexico, who for many years acted as a guide for scientists conducting fieldwork in the area.

== Geographic distribution ==
Gerrhonotus lugoi is found in the Mexican states of Coahuila and Nuevo León.

== Habitat ==
The preferred natural habitat of Gerrhonotus lugoi is rocky desert.

== Reproduction ==
Gerrhonotus lugoi, is oviparous.
