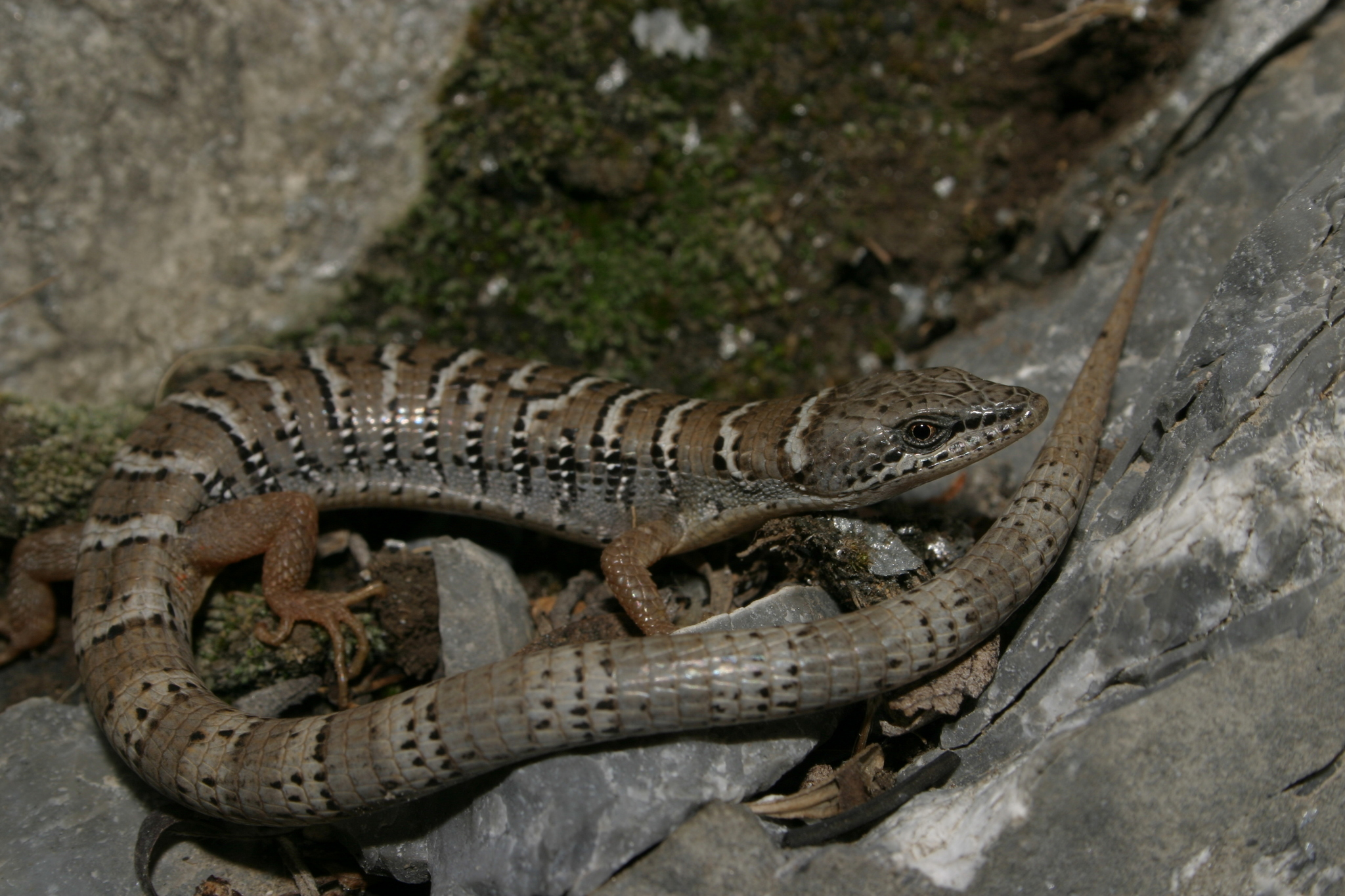

Conservation status
- Endangered (IUCN 3.1)

Scientific classification
- Kingdom: Animalia
- Phylum: Chordata
- Class: Reptilia
- Order: Squamata
- Suborder: Anguimorpha
- Family: Anguidae
- Genus: Gerrhonotus
- Species: G. parvus

Binomial name
- Gerrhonotus parvus Knight & Scudday, 1985

Synonyms
- Elgaria parva — Smith, 1986; Elgaria parva — Liner, 1994; Gerrhonotus parvus — Conroy et al., 2005

= Gerrhonotus parvus =

Pygmy alligator lizard

Species of lizard

Gerrhonotus parvus (common name: pygmy alligator lizard) is a species of lizard in the subfamily Gerrhonotinae. It is endemic to the state of Nuevo León, Mexico. The name parvus is from the Latin word for small because it is the species of smallest adult size recognized in the genus Gerrhonotus. It lives in dry forests transitioning to scrub in the eastern Sierra Madre Oriental at elevations of 900–1,650 m (2,950–5,410 ft) above sea level. They are usually found among dead leaves of yuccas in open wood areas. It seems to prefer dry limestone canyons. It is a relatively small species, with the maximum reported snout–vent length at 76 mm (3.0 in). It is oviparous and has a litter size of 4–6 eggs. Its head is glossy and smooth, grayish brown in color with scattered dark spots. The lips are peppered with pigment and the chin and throat are white in color.
