= Gerrhonotus farri =

Scientific classification
- Kingdom: Animalia
- Phylum: Chordata
- Class: Reptilia
- Order: Squamata
- Suborder: Anguimorpha
- Family: Anguidae
- Genus: Gerrhonotus
- Species: G. farri

Binomial name
- Gerrhonotus farri Bryson & Graham, 2010

Species of lizard

Gerrhonotus farri, also known commonly as Farr's alligator lizard and the Tamaulipan alligator lizard, is a species of lizard in the family Anguidae. The species is native to northeastern Mexico.

== Etymology ==
The specific name, farri, is in honor of American herpetologist William L. Farr, who collected the holotype.

== Geographic range ==
G. farri is endemic to the Mexican state of Tamaulipas.

== Description ==
The holotype of G. farri has a snout-to-vent length (SVL) of 11 cm (4.3 in). It has smooth dorsal scales, and its head is distinctly wider than its neck.

== Reproduction ==
The mode of reproduction of G. farri is unknown.
