= Panamint alligator lizard =

Panamint Alligator Lizard

Conservation status
- Vulnerable (IUCN 3.1)

Scientific classification
- Kingdom: Animalia
- Phylum: Chordata
- Class: Reptilia
- Order: Squamata
- Suborder: Anguimorpha
- Family: Anguidae
- Genus: Elgaria
- Species: E. panamintina

Binomial name
- Elgaria panamintina (Stebbins, 1958)
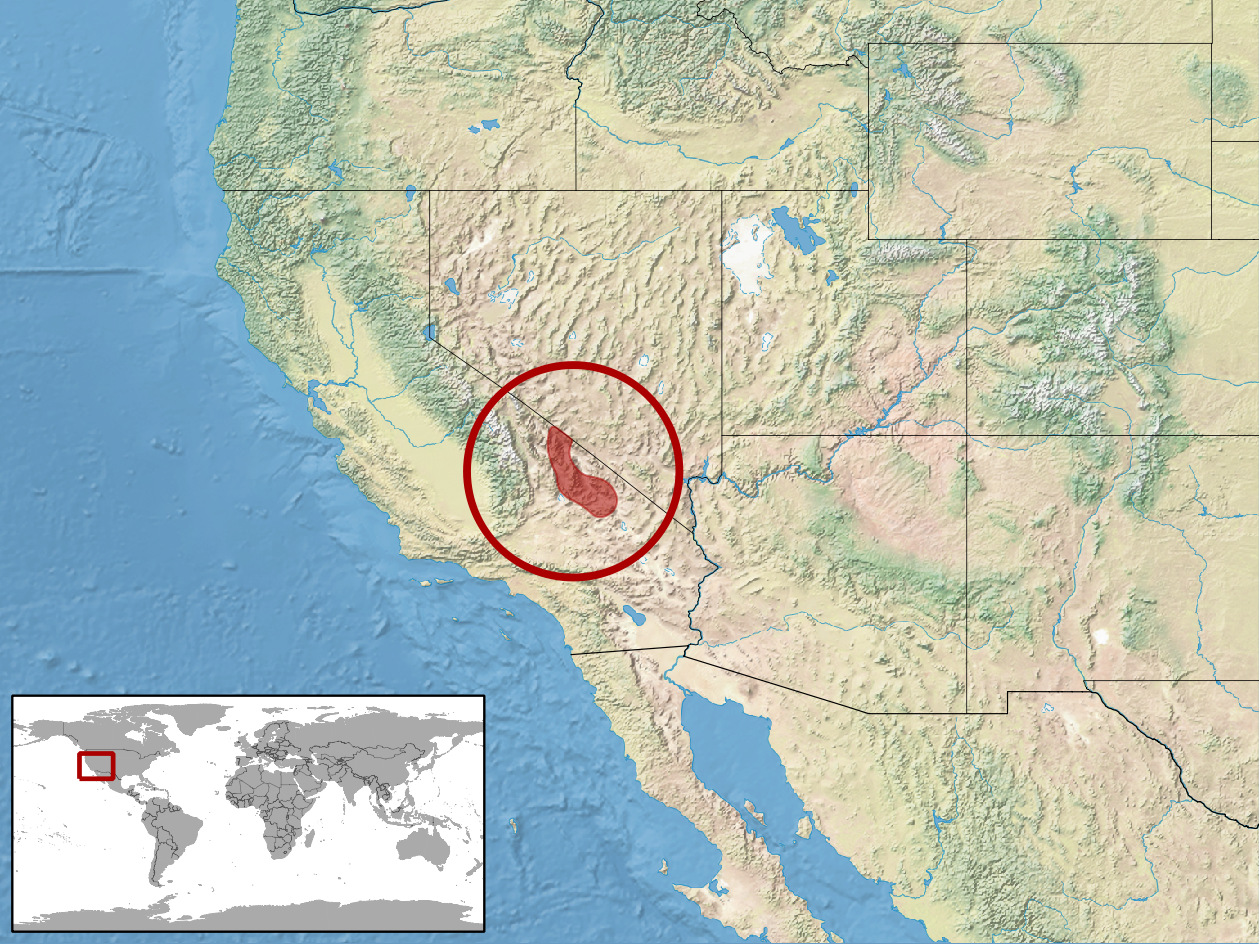

Synonyms
- Gerrhonotus panamintus Stebbins, 1958

Species of lizard

The Panamint alligator lizard (Elgaria panamintina) is a species of lizard in the Anguidae family.

== Distribution ==
Elgaria panamintina is endemic to California, from 2,500–7,513 feet (762–2,290 m) in the desert mountain ranges of Inyo and Mono Counties. They include the Panamint Range of Death Valley National Park, the Inyo Mountains, the White Mountains, and the Coso Mountains.

== Description ==
They are 3 5/8–6 inches (92–152 mm) long from snout to vent. The tail length on this species is usually longer than the body.

This species is also known to be quite aggressive and bites when threatened. The coloration of this species ranges from light yellow, beige, browns, and white.The bodies of these lizards have alternating from light and dark brown bands that encompass their bodies and white marks behind each band on the side. The underside of its body is cream-colored and has grey speckling. Males tend to have broader, more triangular shaped heads compared to females.

== Habitat ==
The Panamint alligator lizard inhabits the areas near streams and springs in desert mountain environments, such as the bottom of canyons. They can also be found in the dense vegetation and damp soil away from the water.

== Conservation ==
The Panamint alligator lizard is recognized as a Species of Special Concern in California. Changes to its habitats such as mining, livestock grazing, and off road vehicles are threats to this species.
