= George Lowery =

American zoologist

- Born: October 2, 1913; Monroe, Louisiana, United States
- Died: January 19, 1978 (aged 64); Louisiana, United States
- Occupation: Ornithologist
- Spouses: Jean ()
- Children: Jeanette; Carol Lynn

George Hines Lowery Jr. (October 2, 1913 – January 19, 1978) was an American ornithologist and professor of zoology at Louisiana State University, who pioneered a technique for studying nocturnal bird migration by large-scale observation through telescopes across the United States of America of flocks of birds as they flew at night in front of the face of the moon.

George was born in Monroe, Louisiana, where his parents encouraged an interest in the natural world. He studied at Louisiana Polytechnic Institute in Ruston from 1930 to 1932 when he moved to the Louisiana State University at Baton Rouge. He received a BS in 1934 and an MS in 1936. He worked for a while as an instructor and was assistant curator of the Museum of Zoology. He received a PhD from the University of Kansas in 1947 and returned to become a professor. In 1955 he was made Boyd Professor of Zoology. He published Louisiana Birds in 1955 which won the Louisiana Literary Award. He also made collection trips, some funded by the McIlhenny family, and he collaborated with Josselyn Van Tyne. His PhD students included Thomas Raymond Howell.

His most famous contribution to ornithology was a technique he developed along with the astronomer W.A. Rense to study nocturnal migration. They recruited a number of amateur astronomers to collaborate and produce quantitative estimates of bird migration by direct observation. This was his doctoral research topic and he developed it with his students S. A. Gauthreaux and Robert J. Newman. He received the Brewster award of the American Ornithologists Union for this work in 1956.

The long-whiskered owlet (Xenoglaux loweryi) and Gerrhonotus liocephalus loweryi, a subspecies of alligator lizard, are named in his honor.
