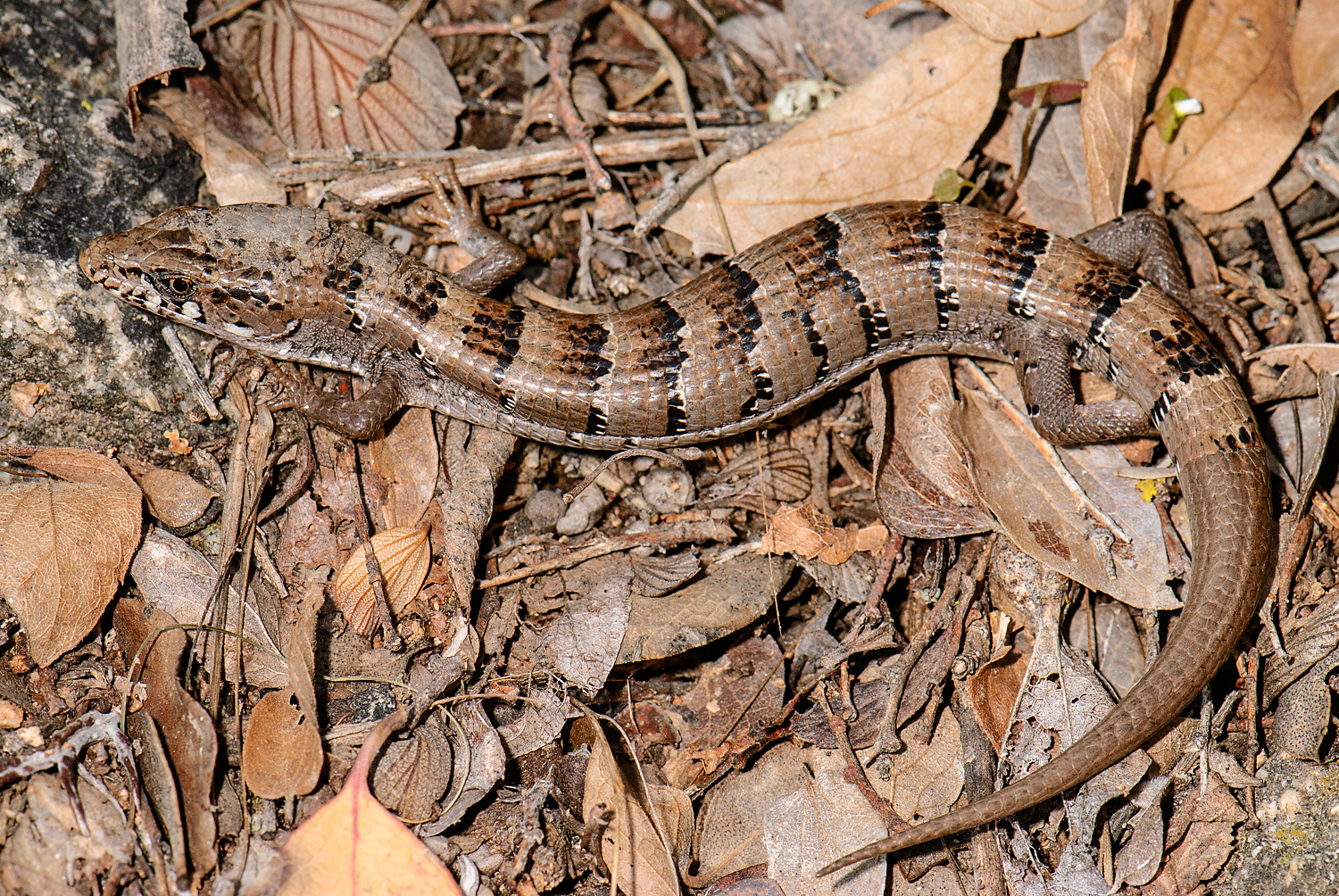

Conservation status
- Least Concern (IUCN 3.1)

Scientific classification
- Kingdom: Animalia
- Phylum: Chordata
- Class: Reptilia
- Order: Squamata
- Suborder: Anguimorpha
- Family: Anguidae
- Genus: Elgaria
- Species: E. kingii

Binomial name
- Elgaria kingii Gray, 1838
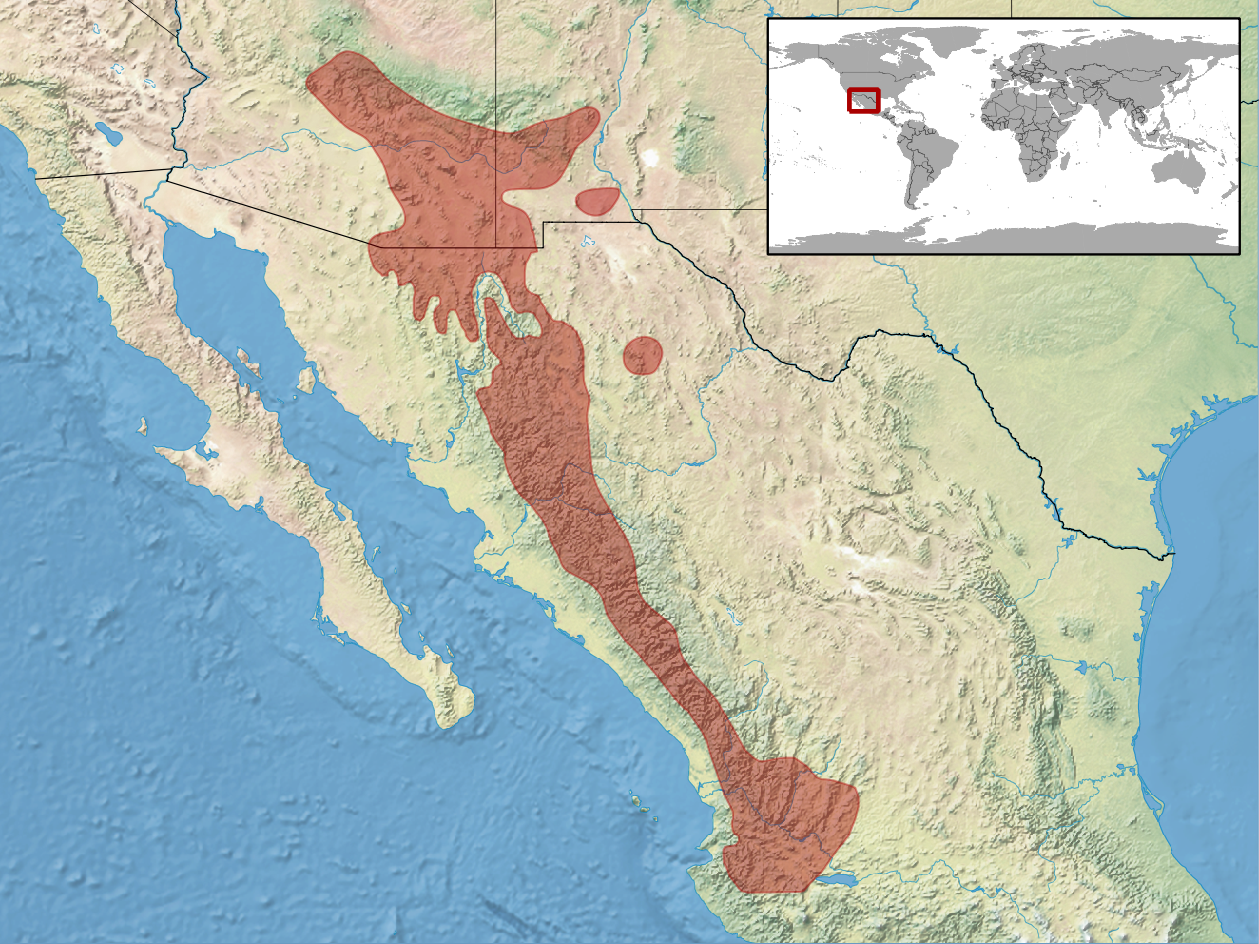

SynonymsRDB
- Gerrhonotus kingii (Gray, 1838); Gerrhonotus multifasciatus A.M.C. Duméril & Bibron, 1839; Elgaria usafa H.M. Smith et al. 2003

= Madrean alligator lizard =

Species of lizard

The Madrean alligator lizard (Elgaria kingii), also known commonly as King's alligator lizard and el lagarto de montaña in Mexican Spanish, is a species of lizard in the family Anguidae. The species is native to the southwestern United States and adjacent northwestern Mexico.

== Etymology ==
The specific name, kingii, is in honor of Phillip Parker King, an Australian-born Royal Navy officer who surveyed the coast of South America.

== Geographic range ==
E. kingii is found from southeastern Arizona and southwestern New Mexico, United States, southward to Jalisco, Colima, Nayarit, southeastern Zacatecas, and southwestern Aguascalientes, Mexico.

== Habitat ==
E. kingii is found in a variety of habitats including desert, grassland, shrubland, and forest.

== Reproduction ==
E. kingii is oviparous.

== Subspecies ==
Three subspecies are recognized as being valid, including the nominotypical subspecies.

- Elgaria kingii ferruginea (Webb, 1962)
- Elgaria kingii kingii Gray, 1838
- Elgaria kingii nobilis Baird & Girard, 1852

Nota bene: A trinomial authority in parentheses indicates that the subspecies was originally described in a genus other than Elgaria.
