= Gerrhonotus liocephalus =

Conservation status
- Least Concern (IUCN 3.1)

Scientific classification
- Kingdom: Animalia
- Phylum: Chordata
- Class: Reptilia
- Order: Squamata
- Suborder: Anguimorpha
- Family: Anguidae
- Genus: Gerrhonotus
- Species: G. liocephalus

Binomial name
- Gerrhonotus liocephalus Wiegmann, 1828
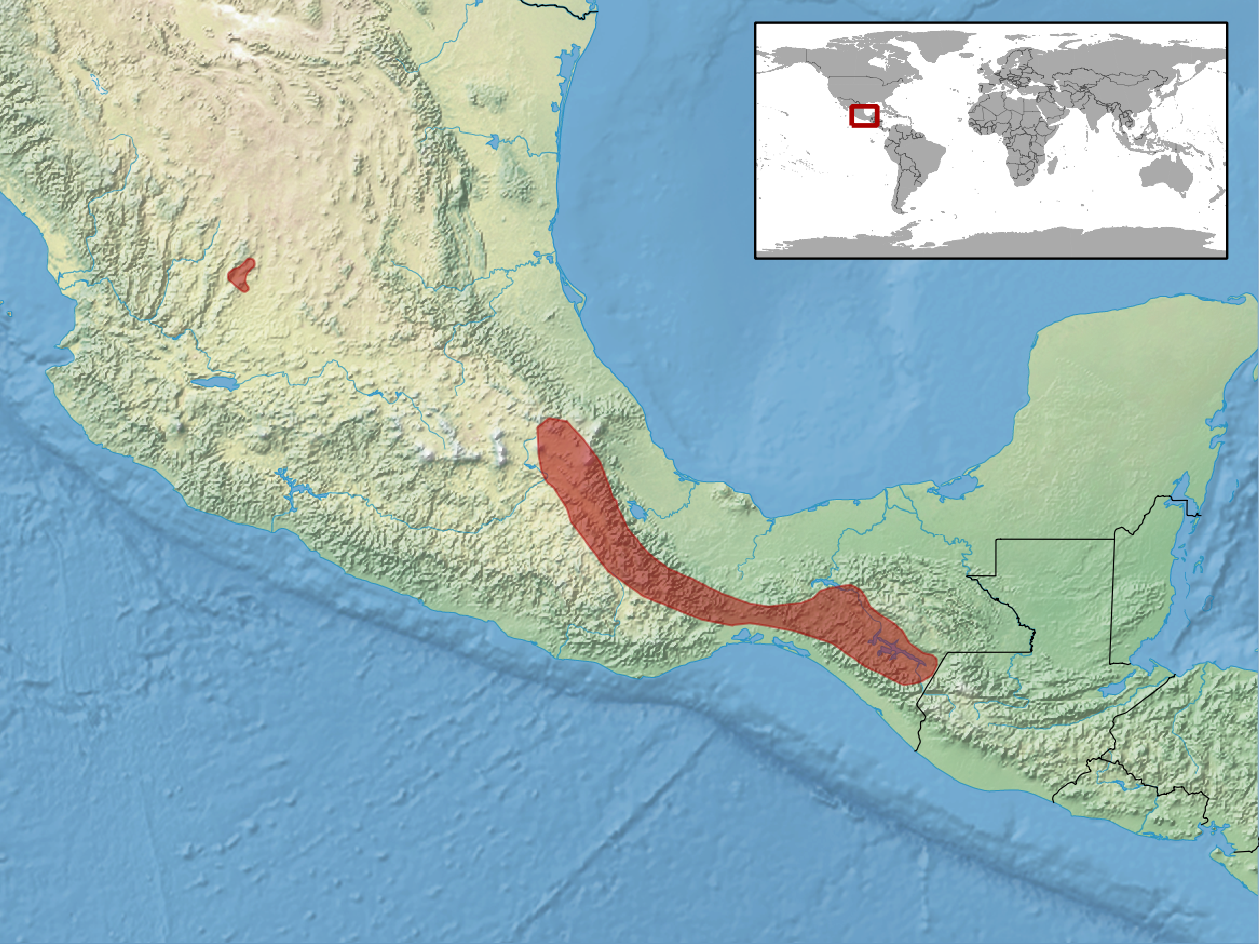

Synonyms
- Gerrhonotus tesselatus Wiegmann, 1834; Pterogasterus tesselatus (Wiegmann, 1834); Scincus ventralis Peale & Green, 1830; Pterogasterus ventralis (Peale & Green, 1830)

Species of lizard

Gerrhonotus liocephalus, also known commonly as the Texas alligator lizard, Wiegmann's alligator lizard, and la culebra con pata in Spanish, is a species of lizard in the family Anguidae. The species is native to Texas, Mexico, and Guatemala. There are three recognized subspecies.

== Habitat ==
The preferred natural habitats of Gerrhonotus liocephalus are forest and shrubland.

== Behavior ==
Gerrhonotus liocephalus is terrestrial.

== Diet ==
Gerrhonotus liocephalus preys predominately upon insects.

== Reproduction ==
Gerrhonotus liocephalus is oviparous.

== Subspecies ==
The following three subspecies are recognized as being valid, including the nominotypical subspecies.

- Gerrhonotus liocephalus austrinus Hartweg & Tihen, 1946
- Gerrhonotus liocephalus liocephalus Wiegmann, 1828
- Gerrhonotus liocephalus loweryi Tihen, 1948

== Etymology ==
The subspecific name, loweryi, is in honor of American ornithologist George Hines Lowery, Jr.
