= Henry S. Fitch =

American herpetologist (1909–2009)

Henry Sheldon Fitch (December 25, 1909 – September 8, 2009) was an American herpetologist.

Fitch was born in Utica, New York. When he was a year old, the family moved to Medford in the Rogue Valley in Oregon. Growing up, he had a keen interest in all the reptiles he could find on his father's 116 acres (0.47 km^{2}) ranch. He recounts that he especially liked snakes, because "the real bonus was in seeing horrified adults scatter."

In 1926, he enrolled at the University of Oregon, but switched to UC Berkeley for his graduate work. He obtained his M.A. in 1933 and a Ph.D. in zoology in 1937. From 1938 to 1947, he worked for the U.S. Fish and Wildlife Service (USFWS) as a field biologist in the department of pest control, studying rodents such as squirrels, gophers, and kangaroo rats.

He served from 1941 to 1945 in the Medical Corps as an army pharmacist, stationed initially in the United Kingdom, then France, and finally in Germany. In 1946, he married Virginia Ruby Preston, with whom he had three children. In 1948, Fitch accepted a position as Superintendent of the University of Kansas Natural History Reservation and instructor of zoology, where he could again pursue his studies of snakes and lizards. He became assistant professor in 1949 and full professor in 1958.

From 1965 on, he did extensive field work in Costa Rica, Mexico, Ecuador, and the Dominican Republic. In 1976, he took up field work in Nicaragua and succeeded in getting a five-year-plan for Ctenosaura conservation, which was instituted in the 1980s. He retired in 1980, but was still an active herpetologist as of 2006, collecting snakes and publishing papers.

On September 8, 2009, he died in the home of his daughter and son-in-law in Stillwater, Oklahoma.

== Taxa named in his honor ==
Fitch is commemorated in the scientific name of a snake, Thamnophis sirtalis fitchi, a subspecies of the common garter snake; and an anole, Anolis fitchi, "Fitch's anole."
