= List of museums in Pittsburgh =

This list of museums in Pittsburgh, Pennsylvania encompasses museums defined for this context as institutions (including nonprofit organizations, government entities, and private businesses) that collect and care for objects of cultural, artistic, scientific, or historical interest and make their collections or related exhibits available for public viewing. Also included are university and non-profit art galleries. Museums that exist only in cyberspace (i.e., virtual museums) are not included.

== Museums ==
Name	Neighborhood	Type	Summary
American Jewish Museum	Squirrel Hill	Art	Contemporary Jewish art
Andy Warhol Museum	North Shore	Art	Over 4,000 Warhol art works in all media - paintings, drawings, prints, photographs, sculptures, installations, films
August Wilson Center for African American Culture	Cultural District	African American	Cultural center about African Americans in Western Pennsylvania and people of African descent around the world
Bicycle Heaven	Chateau	Transportation	website, bicycle store and museum
Carnegie Museum of Art	Oakland	Art	Contemporary art, hosts the Carnegie International every few years, sculpture, architectural drawings, photography
Carnegie Museum of Natural History	Oakland	Natural history	Dinosaurs, gems & minerals, Native American & Egyptian artifacts, nature dioramas, Powdermill Nature Reserve
Kamin Science Center	Chateau	Science	Hands-on exhibits, includes Miniature Railroad & Village of Western PA and the Highmark SportsWorks
Center for PostNatural History	Garfield	Natural history	Storefront museum, displays organisms that have been intentionally altered by humans by means including selective breeding or genetic engineering
Children's Museum of Pittsburgh	Allegheny Center	Children's	Exhibits include Mister Rogers' Neighborhood, Waterplay, Art Studio, Garage, Curiosity Lab, Theater, Nursery, artwork you can play with
The Clemente Museum	Lawrenceville	Biographical	Life of baseball Hall of Famer Roberto Clemente
Elmer H. Grimm Sr. Pharmacy Museum	Oakland	Medical	Historic pharmacy displays, part of the University of Pittsburgh
Fort Pitt Museum	Downtown	Open air	Fort Pitt's role during the French & Indian War, American Revolution, the Whiskey Rebellion and the founding of Pittsburgh, administered by the Pennsylvania Historical and Museum Commission
The Frick Pittsburgh	Point Breeze	Multiple	Includes Clayton, the restored Frick mansion; Frick Art Museum of fine and decorative art; Car and Carriage Museum with over 20 local antique cars; Greenhouse and grounds
Heinz History Center	Strip District	Local history	History of Western Pennsylvania, includes Western Pennsylvania Sports Museum; center also operates Meadowcroft Rockshelter
Kelso Museum of Near Eastern Archaeology	East Liberty	Archaeology	Operated by the Pittsburgh Theological Seminary, Bible archaeology, features collection of ancient Near Eastern and Palestinian pottery and artifacts
Mattress Factory	Central Northside	Art	Exhibits room-sized installation art
ICA Pittsburgh	Oakland	Art	Contemporary art gallery
Miniature Railroad & Village	Chateau	Model trains	Located in the Carnegie Science Center
Nationality Rooms	Oakland	Culture	Guided tours of special classrooms designed to celebrate a different culture that had an influence on Pittsburgh's growth; part of University of Pittsburgh
Photo Antiquities Museum of Photographic History	Allegheny Center	Art	website, history of photography, includes images, cameras and accessories
Pittsburgh Center for the Arts	Point Breeze	Art	Community arts campus that offers arts education programs and contemporary art exhibitions
Pittsburgh Glass Center	Garfield	Art	Hodge Gallery features contemporary glass
Randyland	Central Northside	Art	Dedicated to the outsider art of Randy Gilson.
Silver Eye Center for Photography	South Side Flats	Art	website, hosts four photography exhibits each year
Contemporary Craft	Lawrenceville	Art	Contemporary art in craft media by international, national and regional artists
Soldiers and Sailors Memorial Hall and Museum	Oakland	Military	Largest memorial in the United States dedicated solely to honoring all branches of military veterans and service personnel
Stephen Foster Memorial Museum	Oakland	Biographical	Collection of composer Stephen Foster, also two music theaters
ToonSeum	Cultural District	Art	Cartoon art
Trundle Manor	Swissvale	Art	Oddity museum dedicated to steampunk, horror, and classic film items.
University Arts Gallery	Oakland	Art	Part of the University of Pittsburgh
University of Pittsburgh Dental Museum	Oakland	Medical	Historic dental artifacts and equipment
Western Pennsylvania Sports Museum at the History Center	Strip District	Sports	Located in the Smithsonian wing of the Heinz History Center, focuses on sports history in the Pittsburgh region
Wood Street Galleries	Cultural District	Art	Contemporary art gallery featuring new media artists from around the globe
