= M. Graham Netting =

- Born: October 3, 1904; Wilkinsburg, Pennsylvania, U.S.
- Died: August 26, 1996 (aged 91); Rector, Pennsylvania, U.S.
- Education: University of Pittsburgh (BS); University of Michigan (MS); Waynesburg College (Doctorate in Biology honoris causa)
- Scientific career
- Fields: Herpetology
- Workplaces: Carnegie Museum of Natural History, University of Pittsburgh

Morris Graham Netting (1904–1996) was a herpetologist, an early participant in the conservation and environmental movement, and a director (1954–1975) of the Carnegie Museum of Natural History in Pittsburgh, Pennsylvania.

== Biography ==
Netting was born in Wilkinsburg, Pennsylvania. He had a long career at the Carnegie Museum of Natural History in Pittsburgh, where he was Curator of the Section of Amphibians and Reptiles from 1931 to 1954. (He was succeeded by Curator Neil D. Richmond.) Netting served as Director of the Carnegie Museum of Natural History from 1954 to 1975.

In 1935, Netting and Leonard Llewellyn discovered the Cheat Mountain salamander (Plethodon nettingi), a species unique and endemic to West Virginia. He was Secretary (1931–1947) and President (1948–1950) of the American Society of Ichthyologists and Herpetologists.

In the mid-1950s, Netting helped create the Carnegie Museum of Natural History's field station, Powdermill Nature Reserve. He also helped found many environmental organizations in Pennsylvania including the Western Pennsylvania Conservancy.
