= Clarence John McCoy =

American herpetologist

Clarence John McCoy Jr.
- Born: July 25, 1935; Lubbock, Texas, United States
- Died: July 7, 1993 (aged 57); Penn Hills, Pennsylvania, United States
- Education: Oklahoma State University; University of Colorado Boulder
- Known for: Research on North and Central American herpetofauna
- Scientific career
- Fields: Herpetology
- Workplaces: University of Colorado Museum; Carnegie Museum of Natural History
- Thesis: Life history and ecology of Cnemidophorus tigris septentrionalis (1965)
- Doctoral advisor: T. Paul Maslin

Clarence John McCoy Jr. (July 25, 1935 – July 7, 1993), published as C.J. McCoy and known to friends as "Jack" McCoy, was an American herpetologist. His research focused on the herpetofauna of the United States, Mexico, and Belize.

== Biography ==
McCoy was the son of Clarence John "Mack" McCoy Sr. and his wife Marguerite Ceona (née McNew). His father was a drilling engineer in the petroleum industry. When McCoy was five, the family moved to Tulsa, Oklahoma, where he developed a strong interest in hunting and fishing. At Tulsa High School, he met the herpetologist and ornithologist Edith R. Force, who introduced him to reptiles.

In 1957, he earned his Bachelor of Science degree in wildlife ecology from Oklahoma State University in Stillwater, Oklahoma. That same year, he married Patsy Ruth Kelly, with whom he had one son and one daughter. During the summers of 1959 and 1960, he lectured in zoology at Oklahoma State University, and then completed his master’s degree.

For his doctoral studies, he moved to the University of Colorado Boulder, where in 1965 he completed his Ph.D. dissertation, Life history and ecology of Cnemidophorus tigris septentrionalis, under the supervision of T. Paul Maslin. During his time in Colorado, McCoy conducted numerous field expeditions to Mexico, which became the geographic focus of his career.

In 1962, even before completing his doctorate, McCoy became a research associate at the University of Colorado Museum. From 1964 to 1993, he worked at the Carnegie Museum of Natural History in Pittsburgh, Pennsylvania. The museum already had two prominent herpetologists, M. Graham Netting, former curator of the herpetology section and later director of the museum, and Neil D. Richmond, then head curator of the herpetology section.

McCoy became assistant curator in 1965, associate curator in 1970, and succeeded Richmond as curator in 1972. During his tenure, he continued intensive fieldwork in Mexico, as well as studies in Belize, shorter trips to South America, and expeditions to Algeria. He energetically expanded the herpetology department, with special emphasis on Central American species. Over 30 years, he grew the collection from 75,000 to nearly 180,000 specimens, including one of the world’s largest freshwater turtle collections.

McCoy co-authored or authored the original descriptions of several species, including Aspidoscelis rodecki (C.J. McCoy & Maslin, 1962), Gerrhonotus lugoi C.J. McCoy, 1970, Graptemys ernsti Lovich & C.J. McCoy, 1992, and Graptemys gibbonsi Lovich & C.J. McCoy, 1992.

== Eponyms ==
The Mexican lizard Gerrhonotus mccoyi García-Vázquez et al., 2018, was named in his honor.
