= Robert Wilburn =

Robert C. Wilburn is the director of Carnegie Mellon University Heinz College's Washington, DC campus as well as a Distinguished Service Professor at the college. Prior to this position he was the first president and chief executive officer of the Gettysburg Foundation. He served as president and CEO of the Carnegie Institute in Pittsburgh and as president of Colonial Williamsburg Foundation. Under his leadership, the number of customers, members, donors, and volunteers increased sharply within each organization except in Gettysburg which saw a collapse in the number of visitors under Wilburn and is now at an all-time low for that category. The merger of the Buhl Science Center with the Carnegie Institute and the construction of a new $40 million Kamin Science Center are among his notable accomplishments. While at the Carnegie Institute, Wilburn also contributed to the founding of the Andy Warhol Museum by negotiating gifts of more than a thousand paintings and drawings from the Warhol and DIA Foundations and by raising funds to secure and renovate a historic, seven-story building in downtown Pittsburgh. The Warhol Museum is probably the largest museum in the world dedicated to a single artist and may have been the largest gift ever given to a museum at one time, in value.

He was the youngest university president in the nation while he was president at Indiana University of Pennsylvania (1976–78), and has had roles with private foundations. Wilburn served in cabinet positions for Pennsylvania governor Richard Thornburg, first directing both departments of Budget and Administration and later in the department of Education.

He has held several positions at Chase Manhattan Bank, including executive director of the Asset Liability Management Committee. Prior to that, he held positions in the Defense Department and the White House, working on policy development, most notably the legislation creating the all-volunteer armed forces.

A graduate of the United States Air Force Academy, he earned bachelor's degrees in economics and engineering. Wilburn also attended Princeton University, where he earned master's and doctoral degrees in economics and public affairs.

Wilburn has earned many accolades. Among the most notable, he was voted Pittsburgh's Man of the Year in 1992 and Man of the Year for the Arts in 1989.
