= Gerrhonotus mccoyi =

Scientific classification
- Kingdom: Animalia
- Phylum: Chordata
- Class: Reptilia
- Order: Squamata
- Suborder: Anguimorpha
- Family: Anguidae
- Genus: Gerrhonotus
- Species: G. mccoyi

Binomial name
- Gerrhonotus mccoyi García-Vázquez, Contreras-Arquieta, Trujano-Ortega & Nieto-Montes de Oca, 2018

Species of lizard

Gerrhonotus mccoyi is a species of lizard in the family Anguidae. The species is native to northeastern Mexico.

== Geographic distribution ==
Gerrhonotus mccoyi is endemic to the Mexican state of Coahuila.

== Etymology ==
The specific name, mccoyi, is in honor of American herpetologist C.J. "Jack" McCoy.
