= Aspidoscelis rodecki =

Conservation status
- Near Threatened (IUCN 3.1)

Scientific classification
- Kingdom: Animalia
- Phylum: Chordata
- Class: Reptilia
- Order: Squamata
- Family: Teiidae
- Genus: Aspidoscelis
- Species: A. rodecki

Binomial name
- Aspidoscelis rodecki (C.J. McCoy & Maslin, 1962)

Synonyms
- Cnemidophorus cozumelus rodecki C.J. McCoy & Maslin, 1962; Cnemidophorus rodecki — Maslin & Secoy, 1966; Aspidoscelis rodecki — Reeder, Cole & Dessauer, 2002

Species of lizard

Aspidoscelis rodecki, also known commonly as Rodeck's whiptail, is a species of lizard in the family Teiidae. The species is endemic to Mexico.

== Etymology ==
The specific name, rodecki, is in honor of American entomologist Hugo George Rodeck (1903–2005).

== Geographic range ==
Aspidoscelis rodecki is found in the Mexican state of Quintana Roo.

== Habitat ==
The natural habitat of Aspidoscelis rodecki is the marine intertidal zone.

== Reproduction ==
Aspidoscelis rodecki is an all-female species. Reproduction is oviparous, by parthenogenesis.
