= Miniature Railroad & Village =

Diorama of western Pennsylvania in Pittsburgh

Coordinates: 40.44568°N 80.01832°W

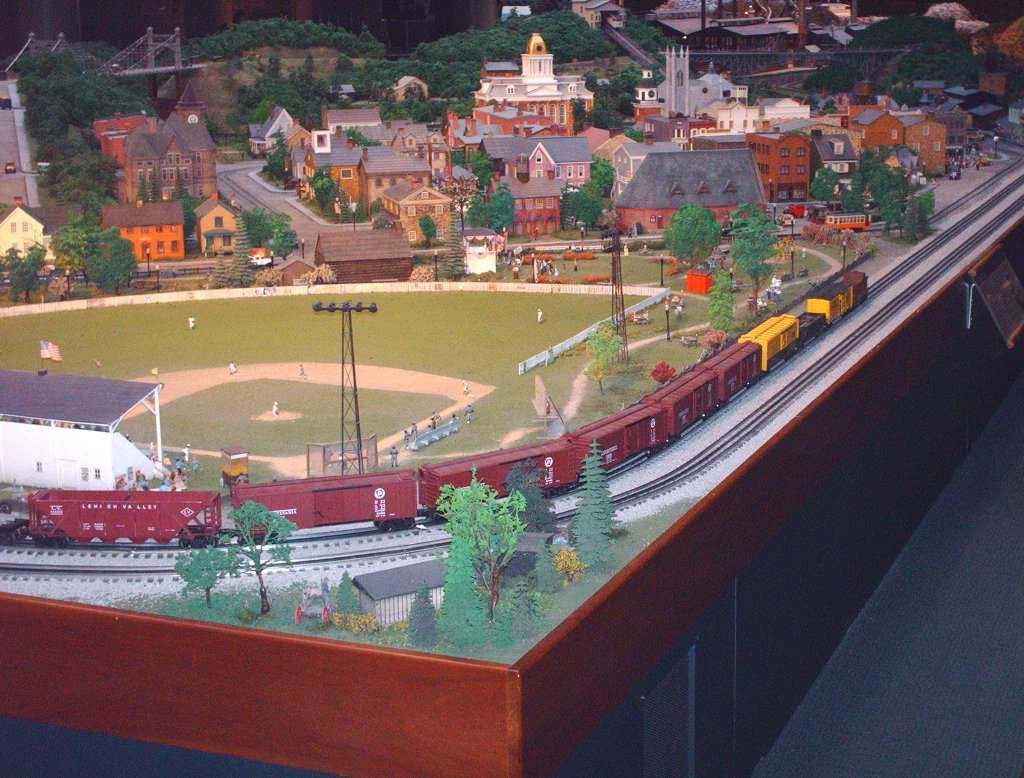
A shot of the one section of the MRRV display

The Miniature Railroad & Village (MRRV) is a large and detailed model train layouts diorama of western Pennsylvania from 1880 to 1930. It is a long-running display currently located in the Kamin Science Center in Pittsburgh, Pennsylvania, the MRRV has been a Pittsburgh tradition for over 50 years.

== History ==
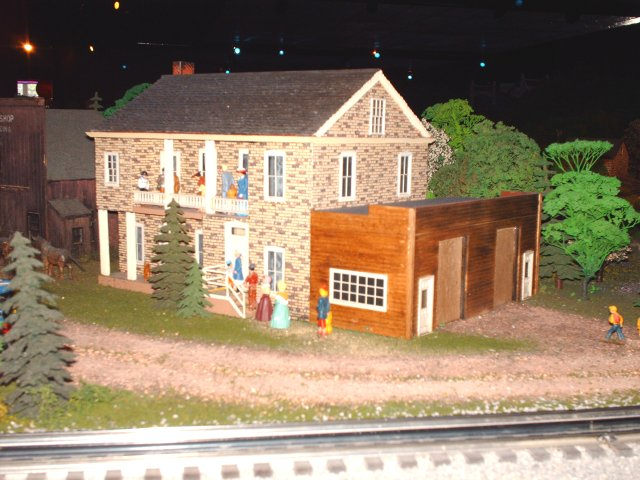
A model of the Bowdish Homestead, since demolished, on the MRRV platform

The exhibit was initiated by Charles Bowdish (1896–1988) of Brookville, Pennsylvania. Bowdish was a soldier during World War I. When doctors discovered a congenital heart problem, he was honorably discharged from service and sent home, where he began to build models of structures around Brookville, his hometown. Every Christmas, in his home on Creek Street (the house has since been demolished), the buildings were assembled in a display, complete with Lionel trains running through it. On December 24, 1920, Charles hosted his brother's wedding and reception, and entertained the guests by running his train display. One of the guests, Alfred Truman, asked if he could bring some friends over to see it—word quickly spread, and nearly 600 people showed up. Because of this, December 24 is considered to be the birth date of the exhibit.

Bowdish soon began setting up and exhibiting his railroad yearly at Christmas time in his house. Each year there would be a different theme, such as White Christmas or Indian Summer. The railroad spanned the entire second floor, and no admission fee was ever charged. Thousands of people saw it over the years, some coming from other countries. A combination of a flood nearly destroying his stored models, and his insurance company refusing to cover the crowds anymore, forced Charles to begin searching for a new home for his work. He originally offered it to Brookville, but the town declined.

Eventually he offered it to the Buhl Planetarium and Institute of Popular Science in Pittsburgh (renamed Buhl Science Center in the 1970s). The Buhl offered him space, and the exhibit opened there on December 1, 1954, and ran until December 31. During the 31-day period, figures showed that 23,885 visitors viewed the layout. It was originally 14' X 14', and was called The Great Christmastown Railroad. It was renamed The Miniature Railroad & Village in 1957. The exhibit was an instant hit, and was and still is one of the major holiday attractions in Pittsburgh. The MRRV was in the basement, and the queue would at times extend out the front door and around the block, and the wait would be four hours long.

Eventually the dates it was open would be the first weekend of November to the last weekend of February. It was then torn down and stored until the next year because the space had to be used for the annual science fair.

On January 1, 1987, the Buhl officially became a part of the Carnegie Museums of Pittsburgh. The Buhl staff had been wanting to expand the science center so they could bring in large travelling exhibits, and create more of their own. Joining the Carnegie Museums of Pittsburgh allowed them to have the resources to do it. Buhl closed on August 31, 1991, and Kamin Science Center opened on October 5, 1991.

A whole new building allowed the museum to dedicate a room just to the MRRV. The new and expanded Miniature Railroad & Village opened in fall 1992.

== Description ==
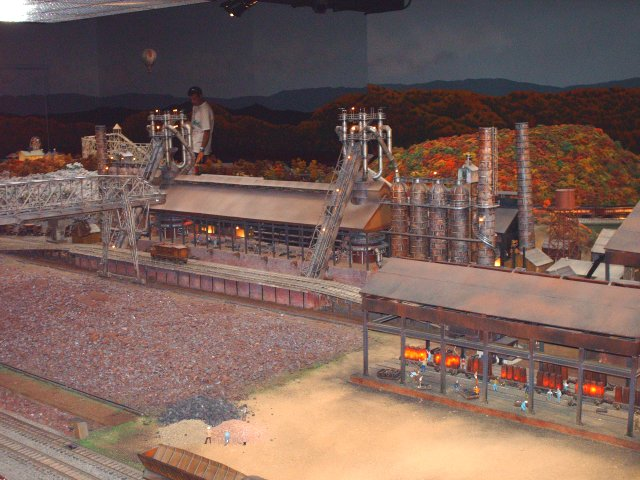
The replica of the Sharon Steel Mill

The current platform is 83 feet (25 m) long by 30 feet (9.1 m) wide, 60% larger than the original. Five independent loops feature Lionel trains, and one Bowser trolley travels through the town; these lines operate continuously.

The new display's philosophy was the historic and educational significance of Pittsburgh and the surrounding areas; this permitted the display to be considered a large, animated history book. Scenes on the display depict how people worked, lived, and played during the years 1880–1930. These years cover part of the American Industrial Revolution, the Victorian and Edwardian eras, the Gilded Age (as Mark Twain called it), World War I, the Roaring 20s, and the beginning of the Great Depression. All of the models featured on the display are handcrafted by staff, both paid and volunteers, and replicate real structures from around Western Pennsylvania. The display boasts the largest steel mill ever replicated in O scale: the Sharon Steel Mill from Farrell, PA, which was constructed from the mill's actual blueprints.

Expert advisors were contracted to make the new display as lifelike as possible. For example, a Harvard professor designed the lighting system to resemble the movement of the Sun and actual daylight. A sophisticated computer system controls the layout. Opto 22, a company which supplies NASA and Disney World with control modules, provided the system.

Every year, two months before Thanksgiving, the display closes down for maintenance. During this shutdown period, new models are installed, and sometimes new animations are installed, which were constructed earlier in the year, for exhibition on the display. Occasionally old models are installed as well. Scenes on the display are updated, and the layout is given a careful and thorough cleaning. The exhibit reopens the day after Thanksgiving.

== Collectible boxcars ==
Since 1999, Lionel has issued collectable boxcars and a caboose as part of the commemorative MRRV series. Each year, the boxcar features a unique design, drawn up inhouse. These limited edition cars are only available through the Kamin Science Center's XPLOR Store. Additionally, Lionel produced a Sub car for the Kamin Science Center in 2002 as part of the LCCA Pittsburgh Convention.

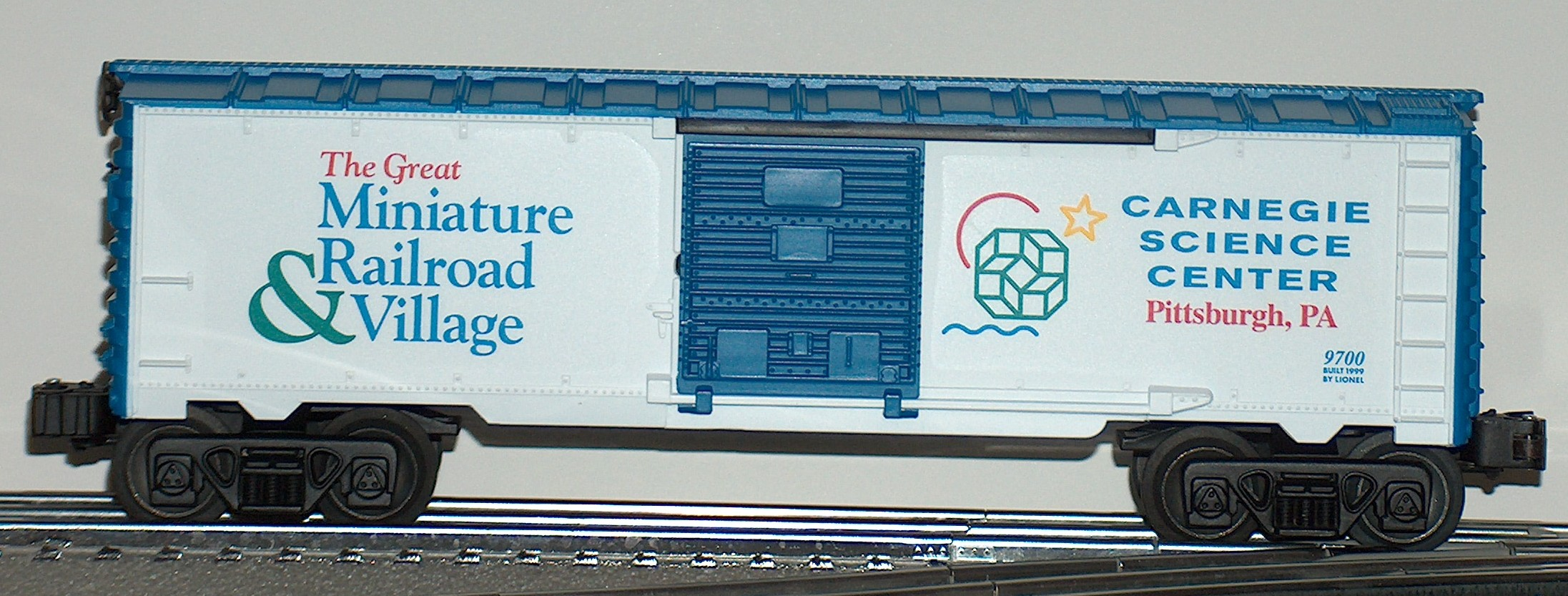

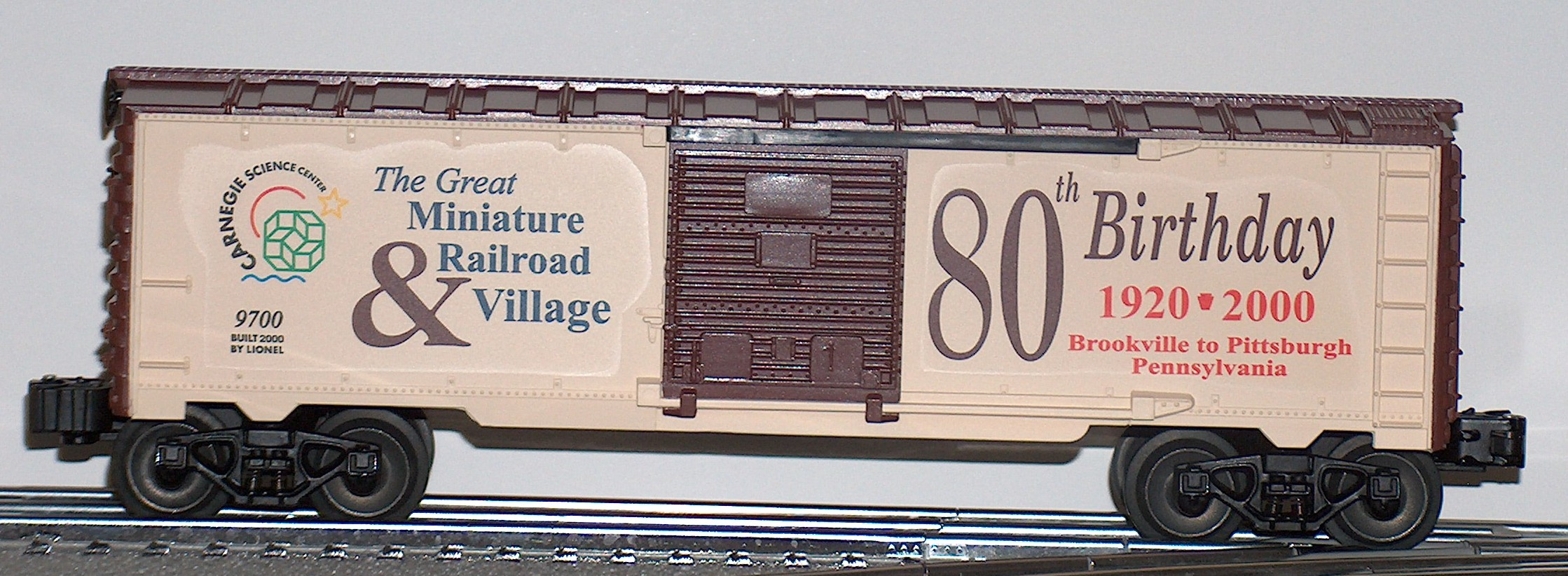

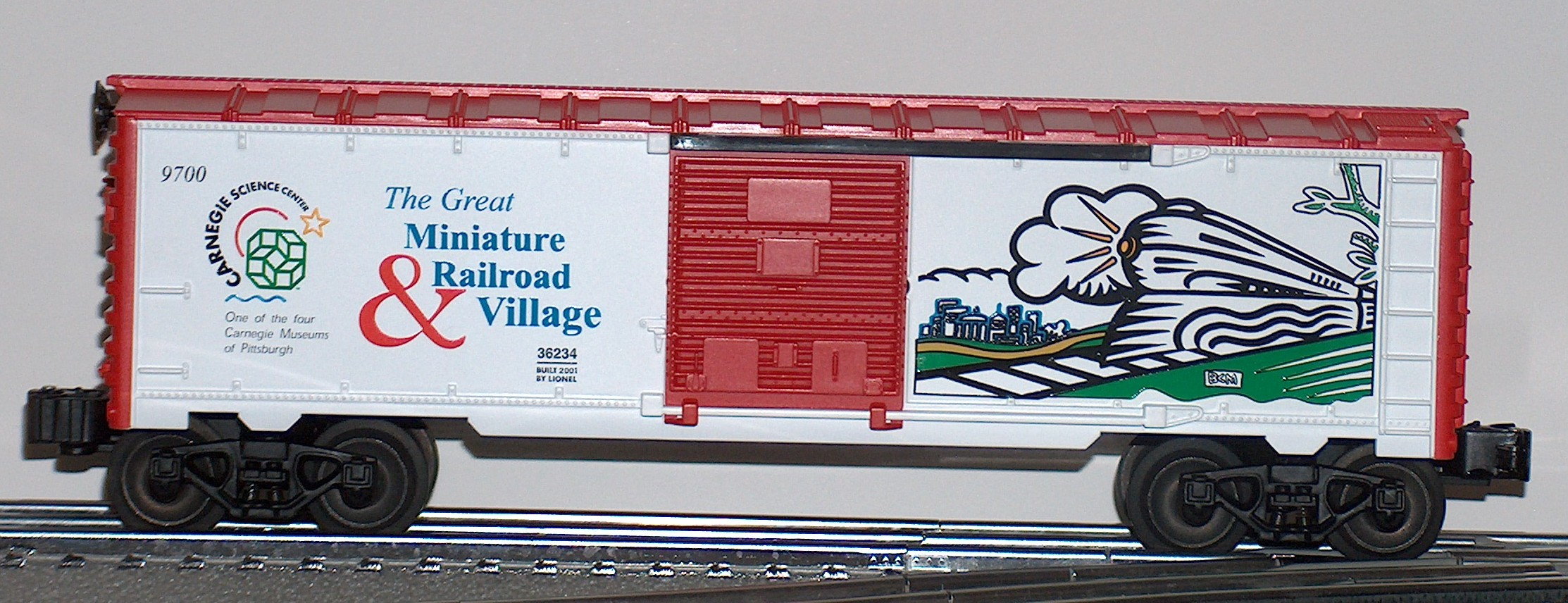

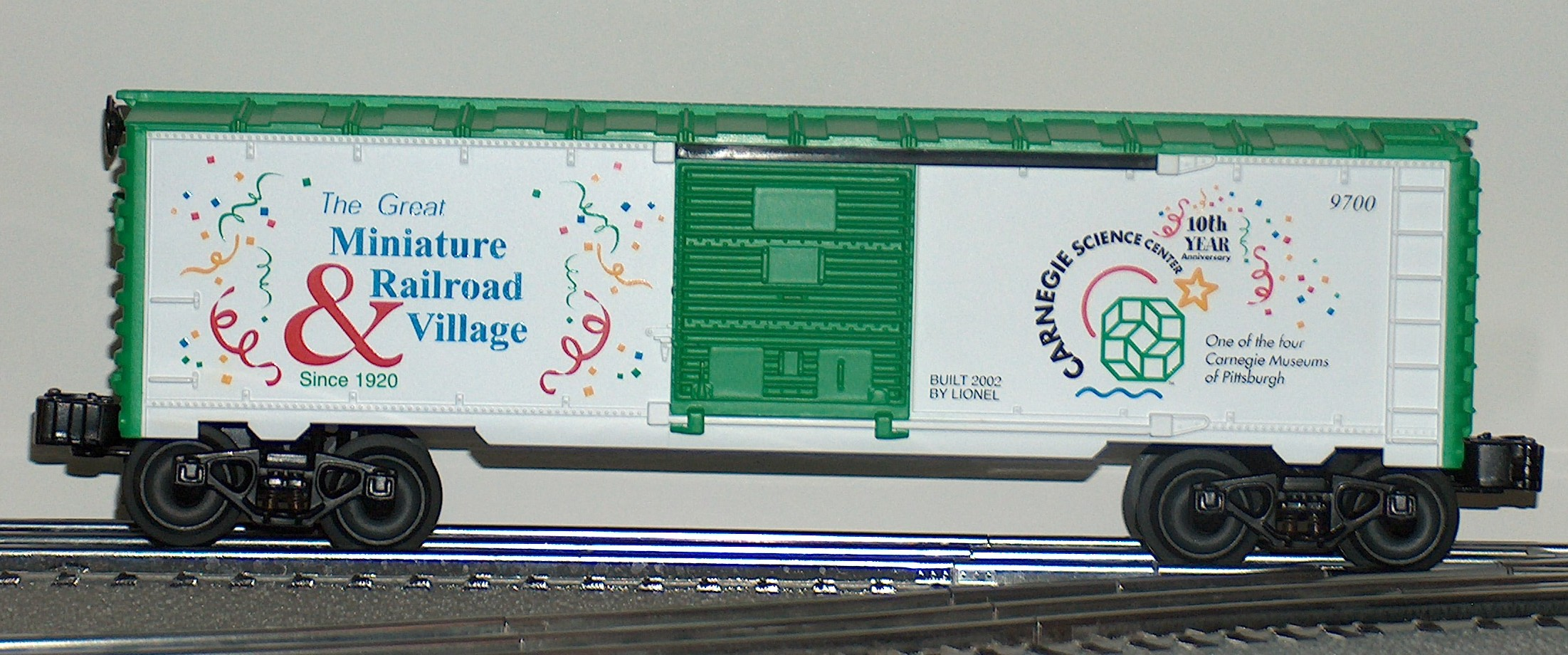

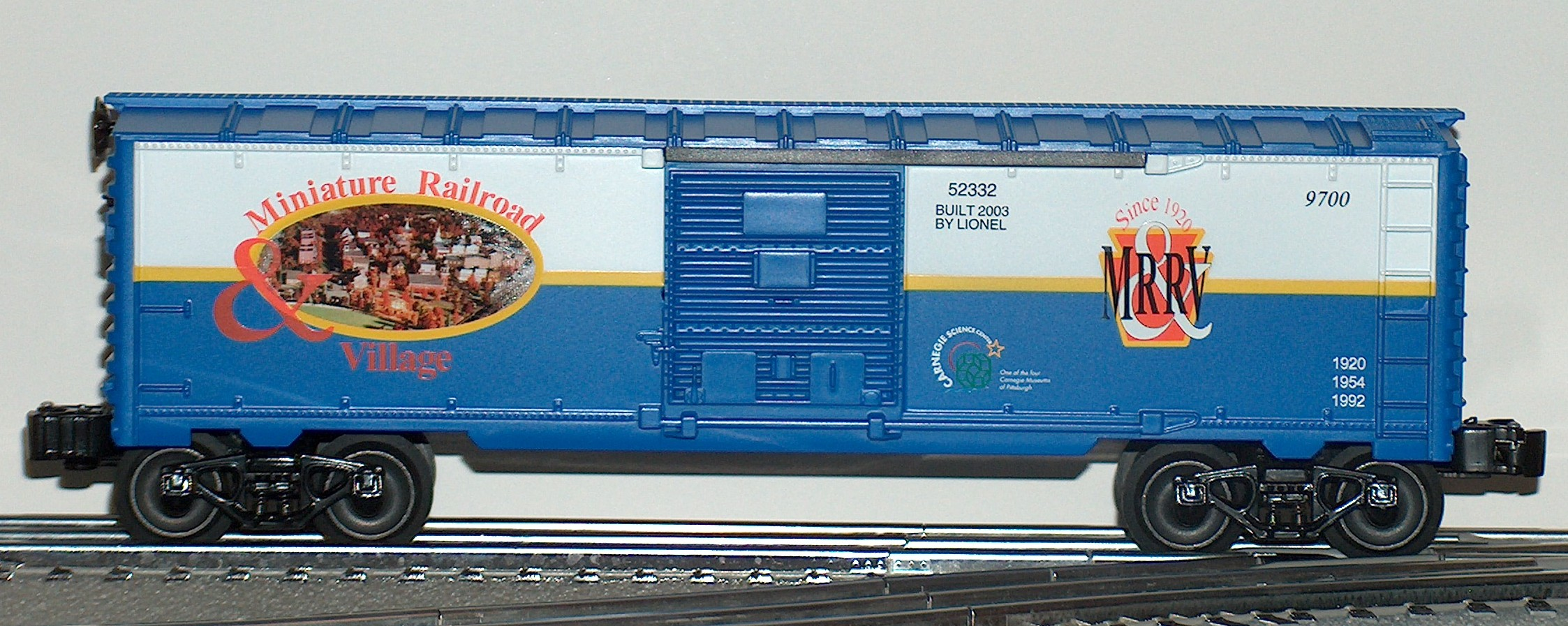

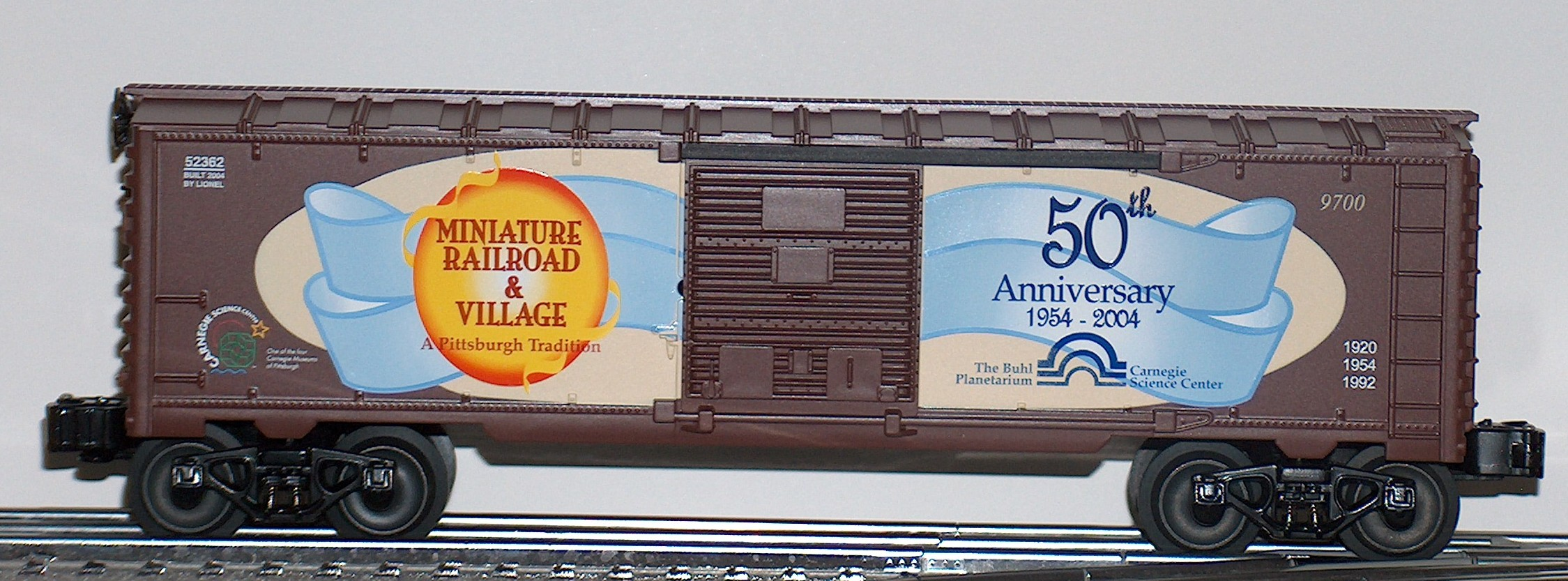

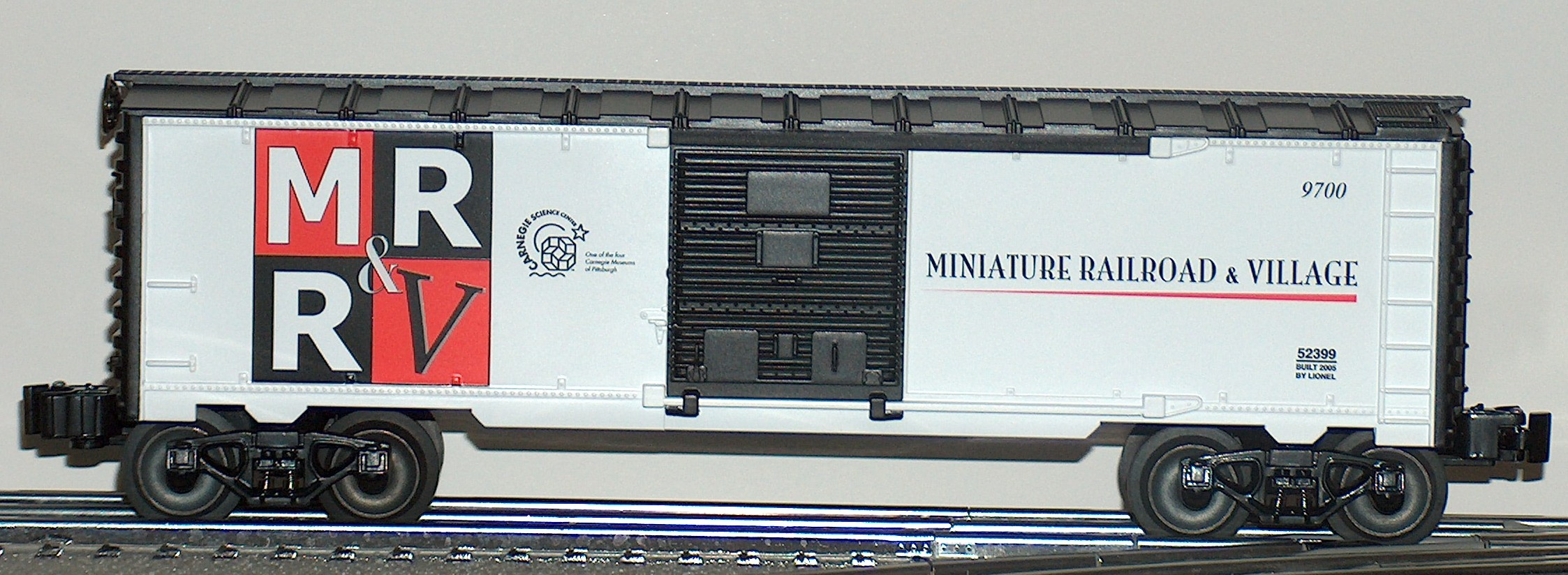

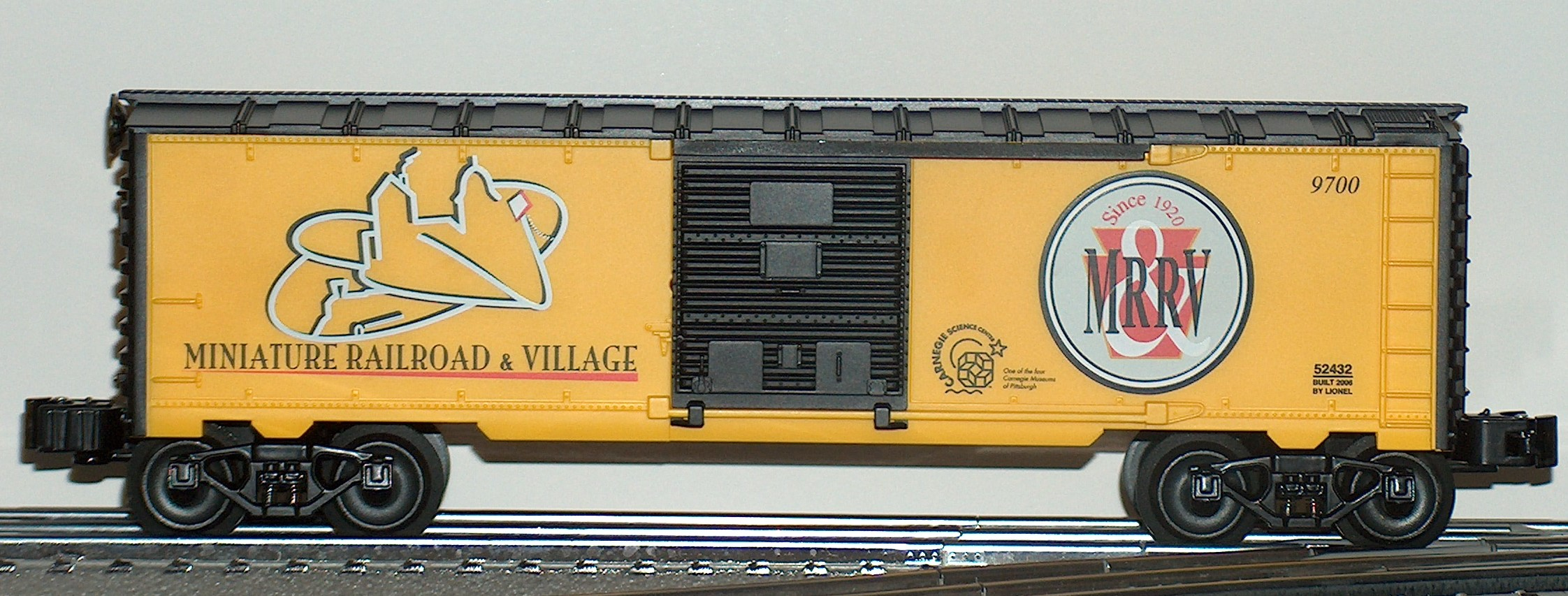

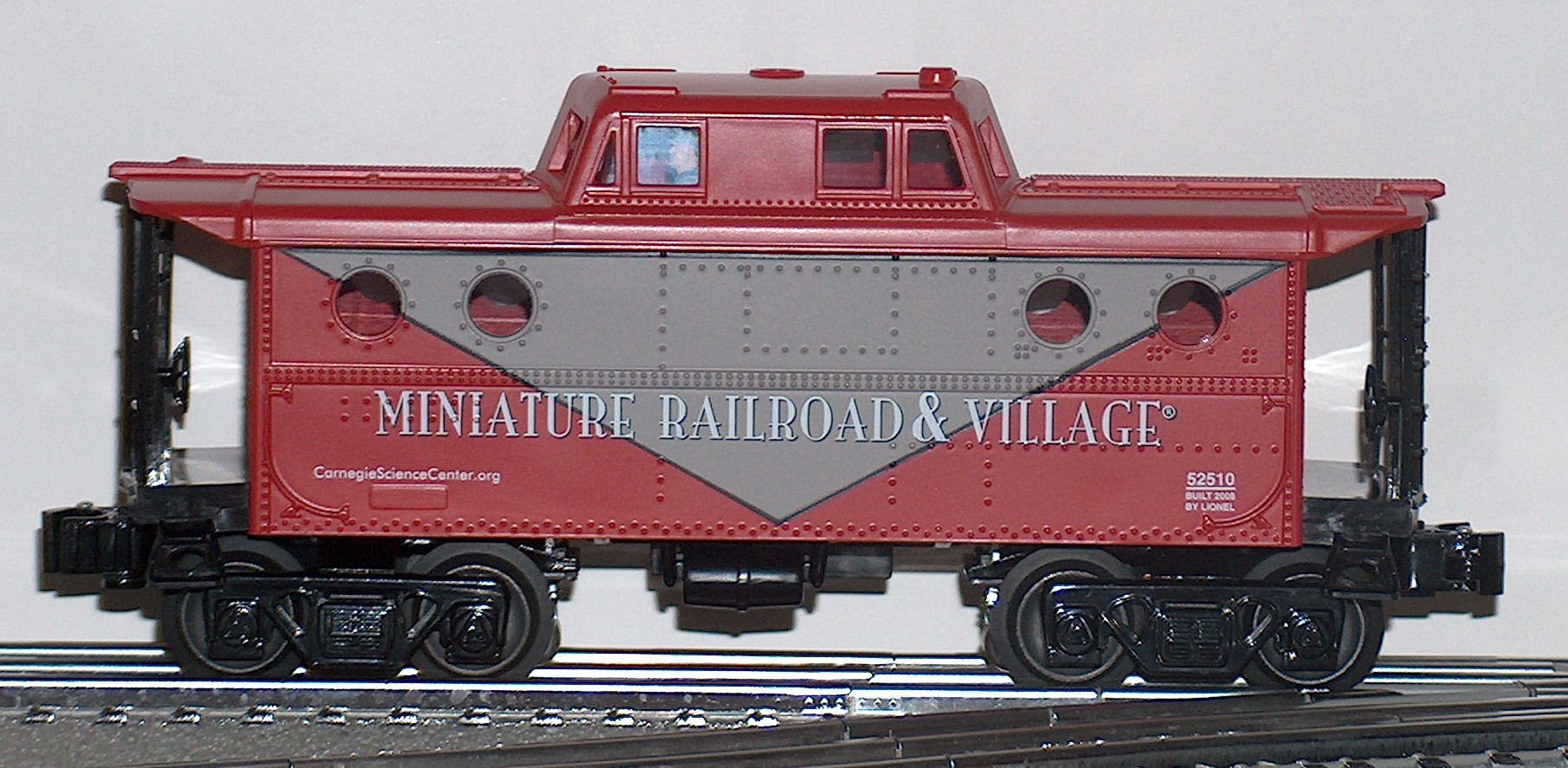

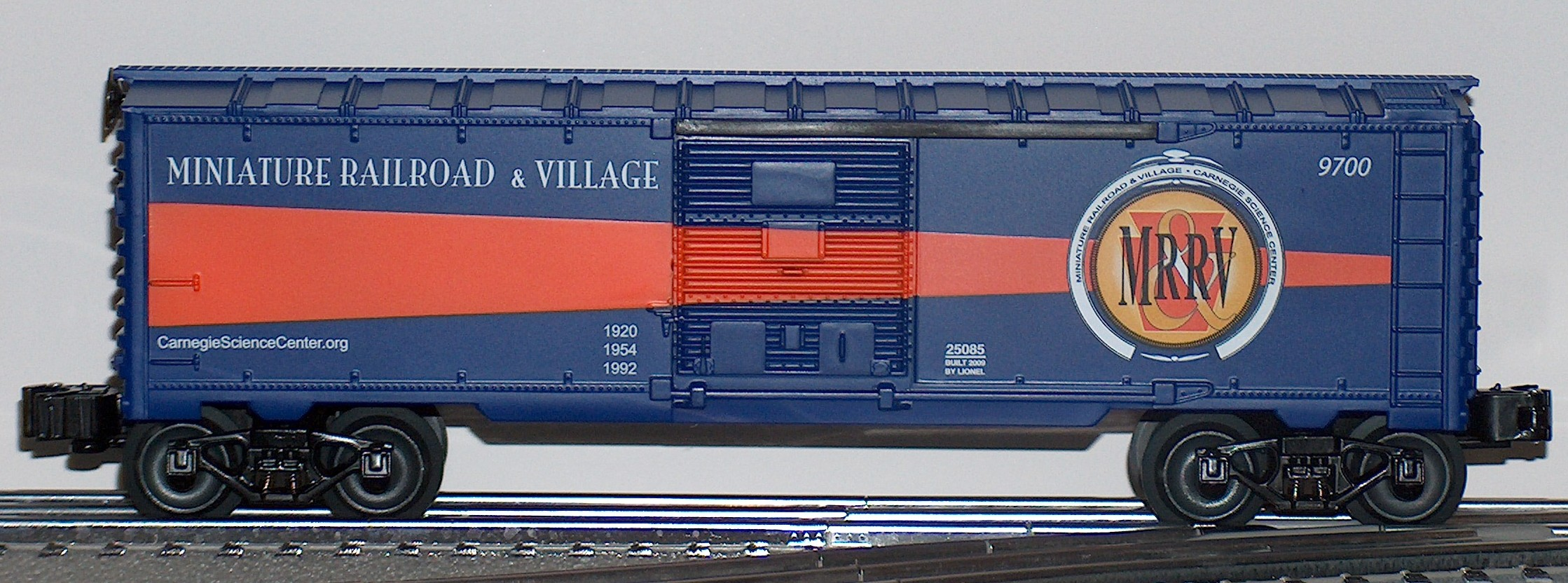

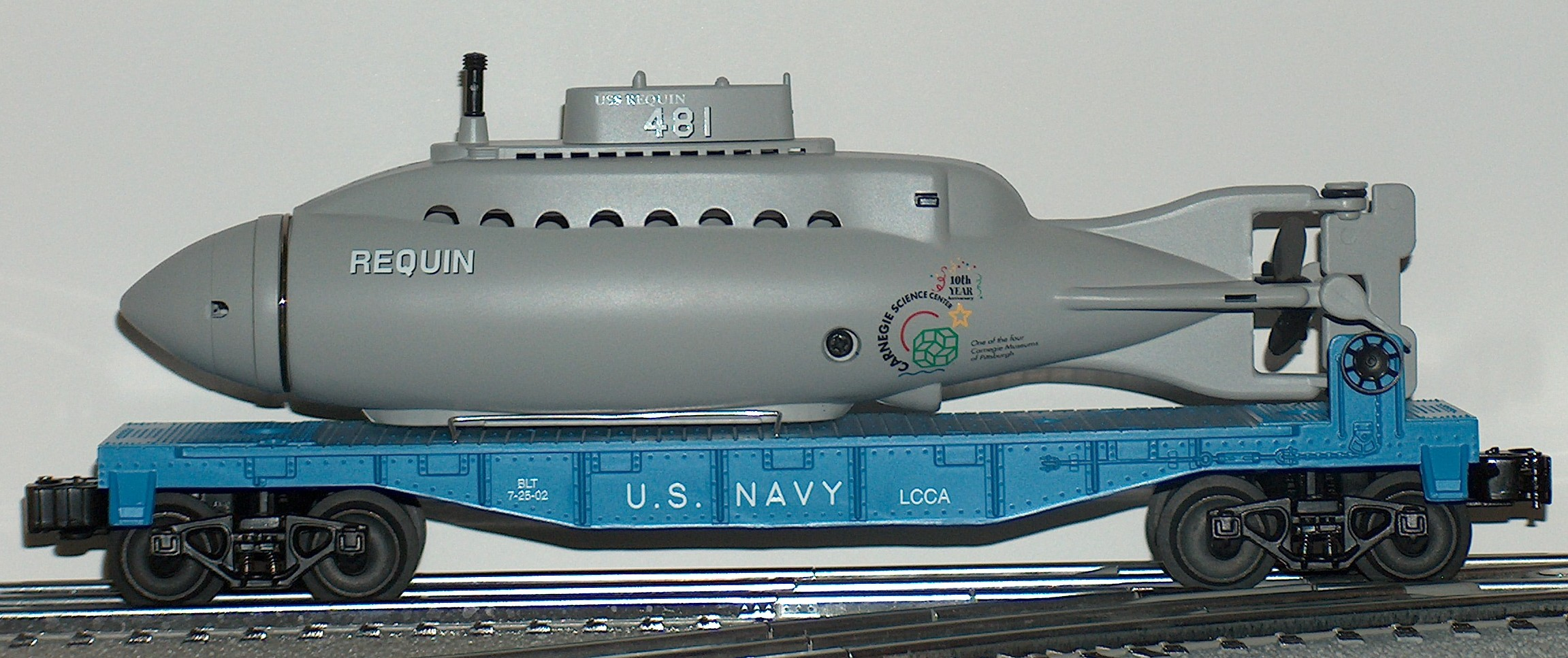

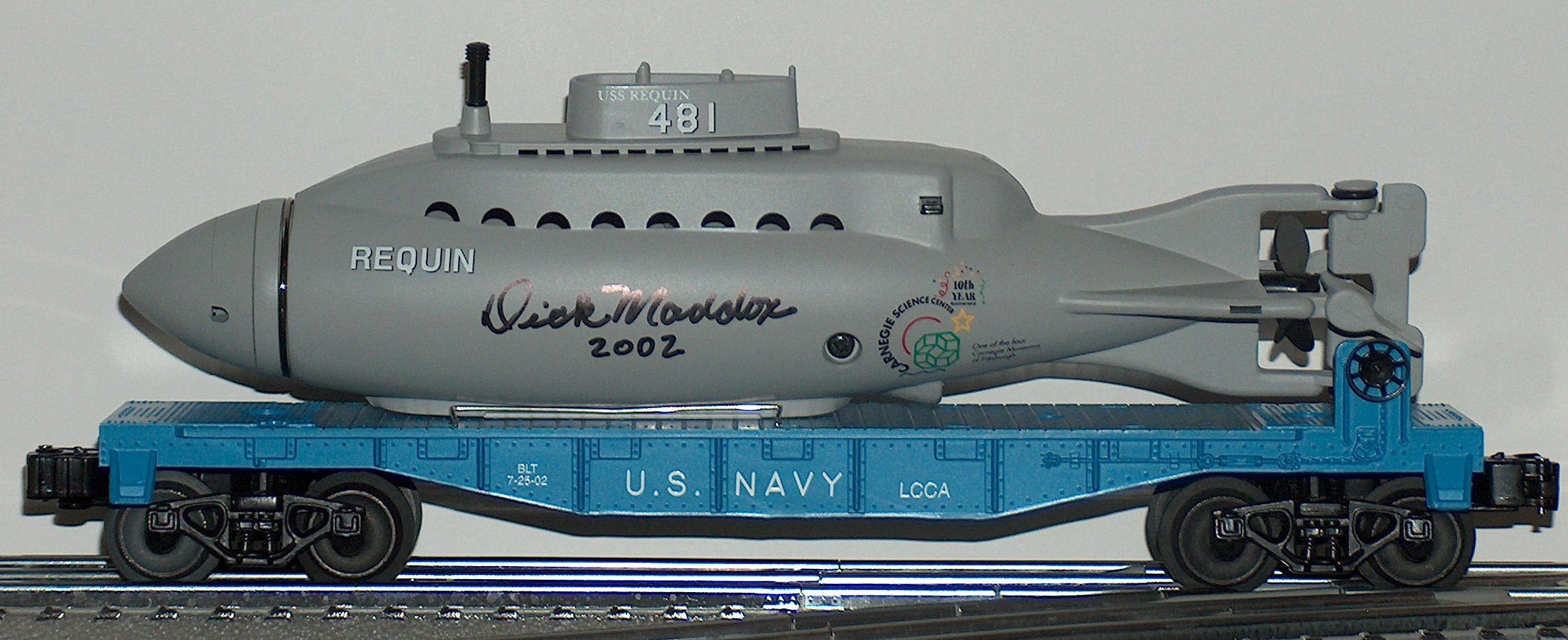

== Historic buildings and scenes ==
- 1869 Indiana County Courthouse
- Lakemont Park's Leap-The-Dips roller coaster
- Luna Park Entrance
- Mister Rogers' Neighborhood television show house
- Rachel Carson Homestead
- Sharon Steel Corporation mill
- George Westinghouse Castle
- John Roebling's house and workshop
- Forbes Field
- Fallingwater
- Original Heinz Factory

== Facts and Figures ==
- The display is 83 feet (25 m) long by 30 feet (9.1 m) wide
- Over 250,000 handmade trees are planted on the display
- There are over 100 handmade animations, not including the trains, that help create a sense of life
- There is over 1,500 feet (460 m) of track, all from GarGraves
- Real water is used, with boats floating down powered by magnets
- Other real materials used: Coal, coke, limestone, and iron ore
