= Carnegie Museum of Natural History =

Museum in Pittsburgh, Pennsylvania, US

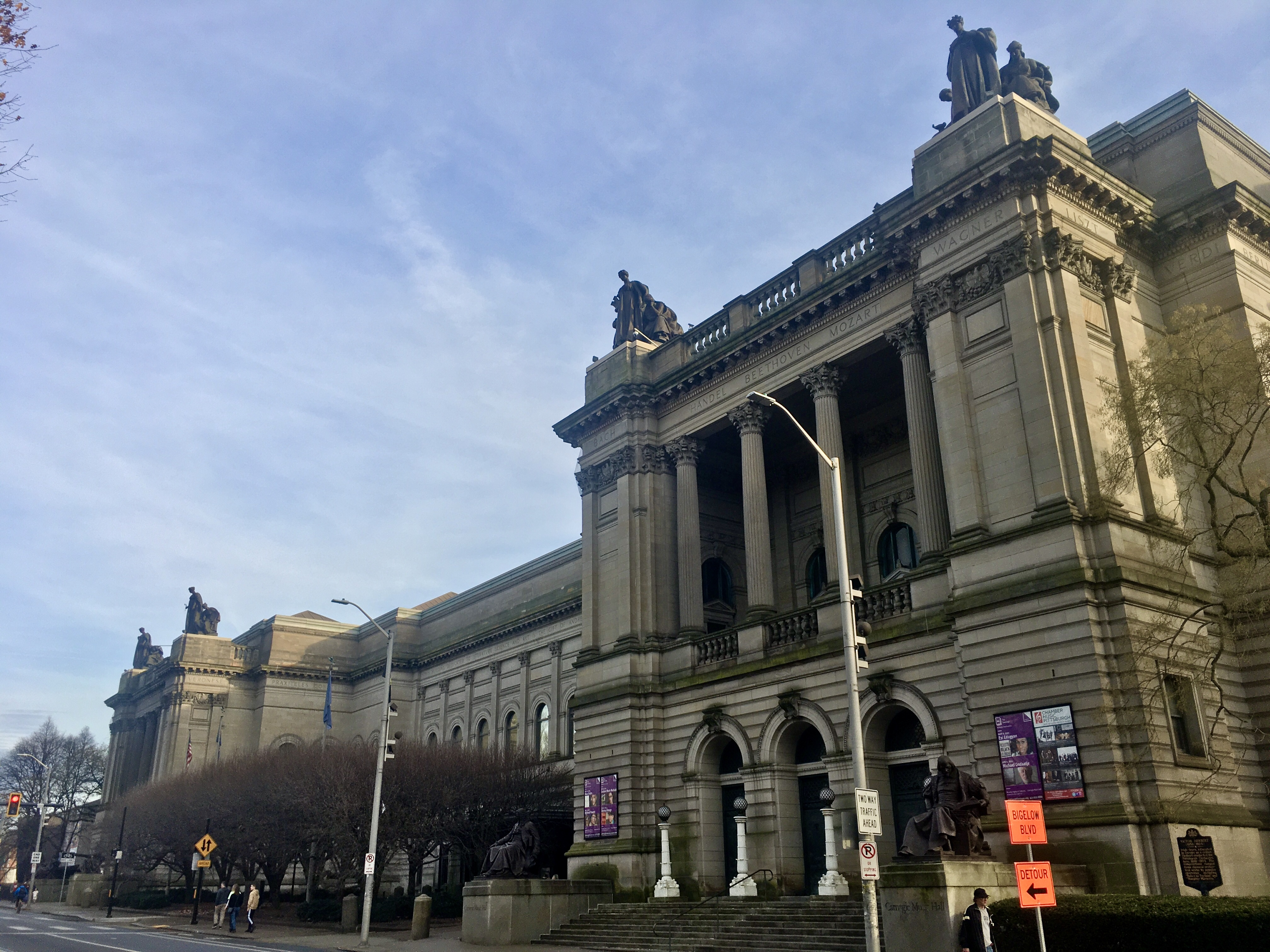
- One of the four Carnegie Museums of Pittsburgh

- Location of Carnegie Museum in Pennsylvania Carnegie Museum of Natural History (Pennsylvania) Carnegie Museum of Natural History (the United States)
- Established: 1895
- Location: Pittsburgh, Pennsylvania
- Coordinates: 40°26′37″N 79°57′00″W
- Type: Natural History
- Visitors: 300,000
- Director: Gretchen Baker
- Public transit access: 54, 58, 61A, 61B, 61C, 61D, 67, 69
- Parking: On site and street
- Website: carnegiemnh.org

The Carnegie Museum of Natural History (abbreviated as CMNH or CM) is a natural history museum in the Oakland neighborhood of Pittsburgh, Pennsylvania. It was founded by Pittsburgh-based industrialist Andrew Carnegie in 1896. Housing some 22 million specimens, the museum features extensive paleontological and entomological collections.

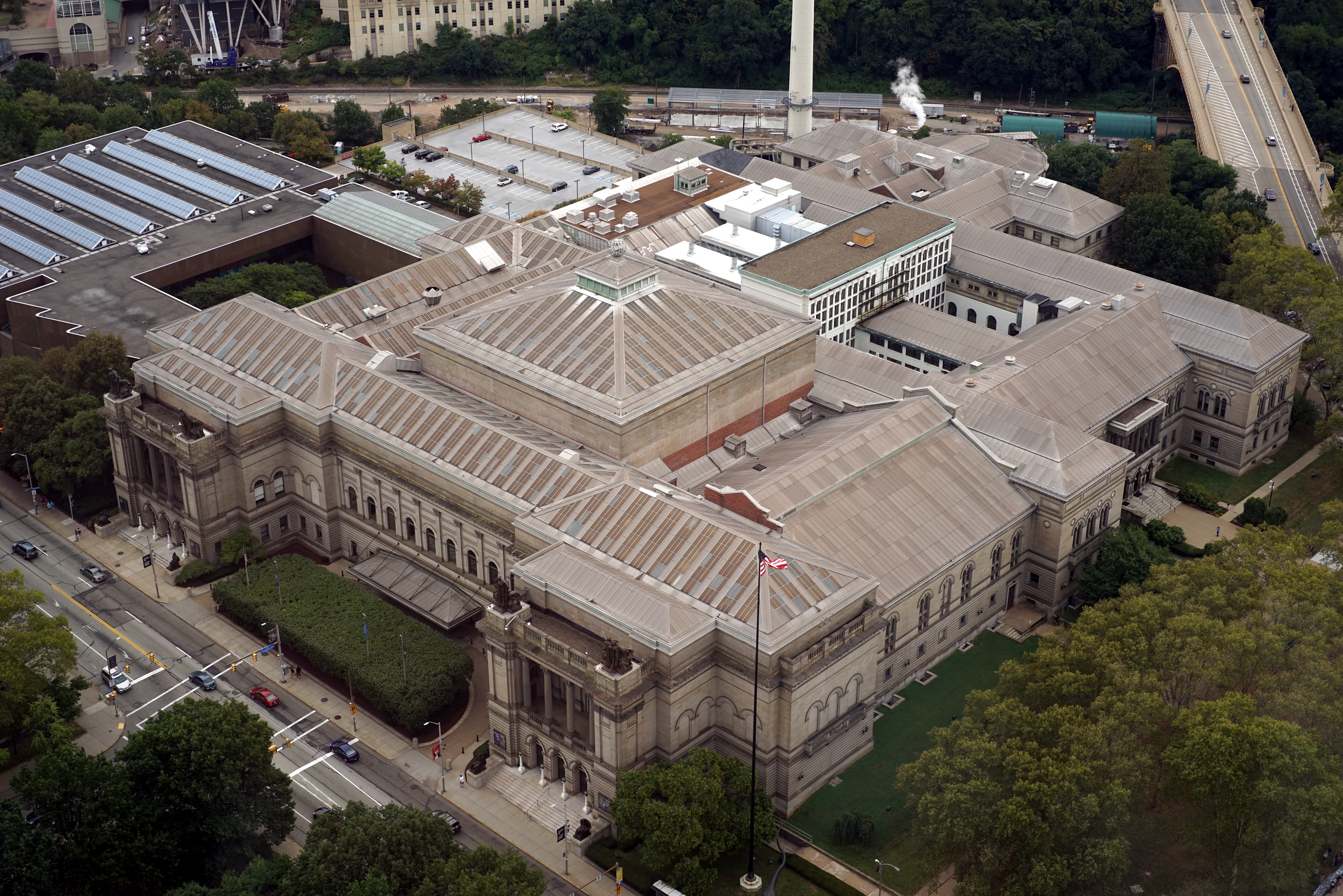
As seen from the 36th floor of the Cathedral of Learning.

== Description and history ==
The museum consists of 115,000 square feet (10,700 m^{2}) organized into 20 galleries as well as research, library, and office space. It holds some 22 million specimens, of which about 10,000 are on view at any given time and about 1 million are cataloged in online databases. In 2008 it hosted 386,300 admissions and 63,000 school group visits. Museum education staff also actively engage in outreach by traveling to schools all around western Pennsylvania.

The museum gained prominence in 1899 when its scientists unearthed the fossils of Diplodocus carnegii. Notable dinosaur specimens include one of the world's very few fossils of a juvenile Apatosaurus, the world's first specimen of a Tyrannosaurus rex, and a recently identified species of oviraptorosaur named Anzu wyliei.

Research teams including former Carnegie scientists made important discoveries such as Puijila darwini, Castorocauda lutrasimilis, and Hadrocodium wui.

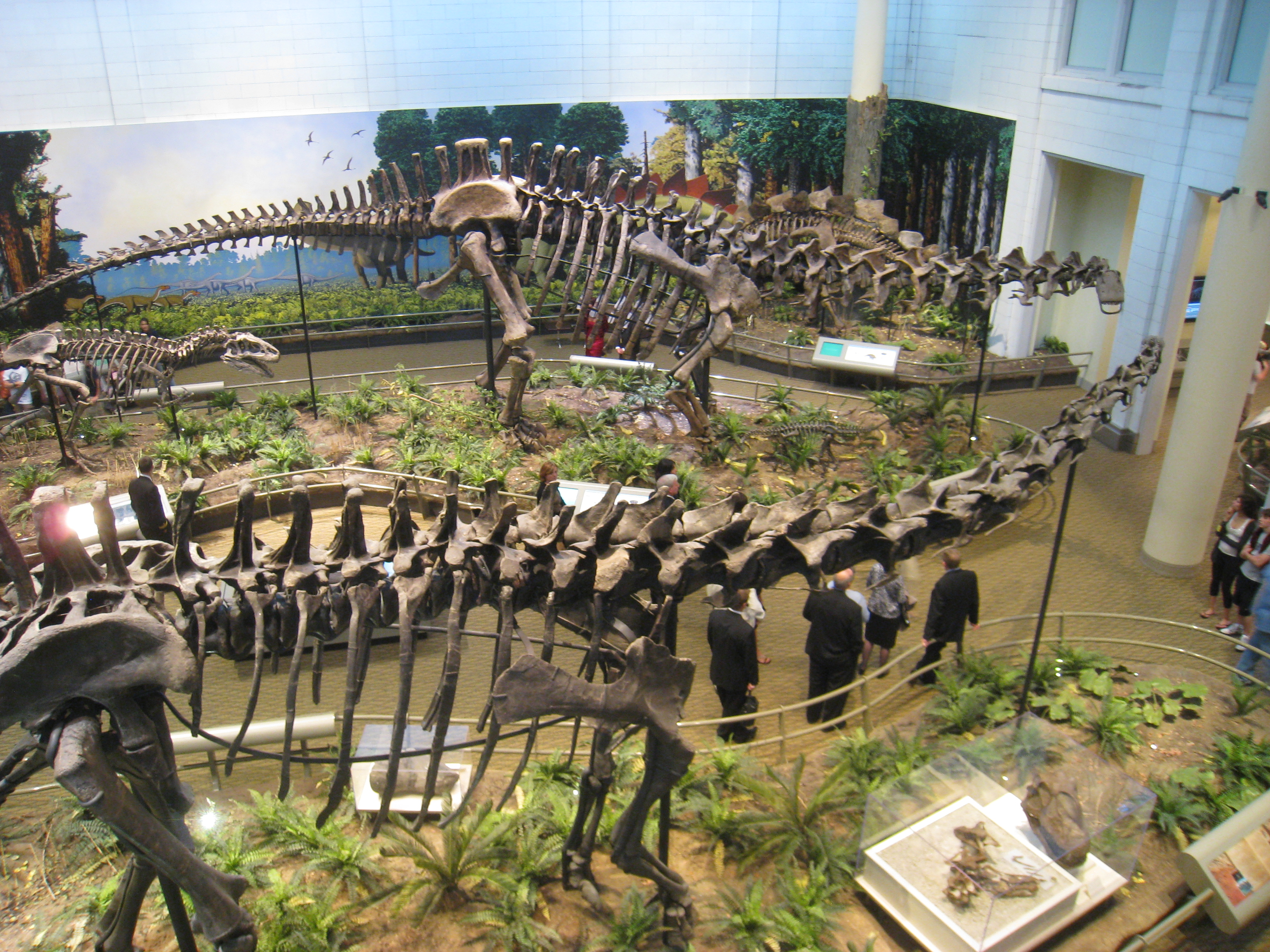
Portion of the dinosaur exhibit.

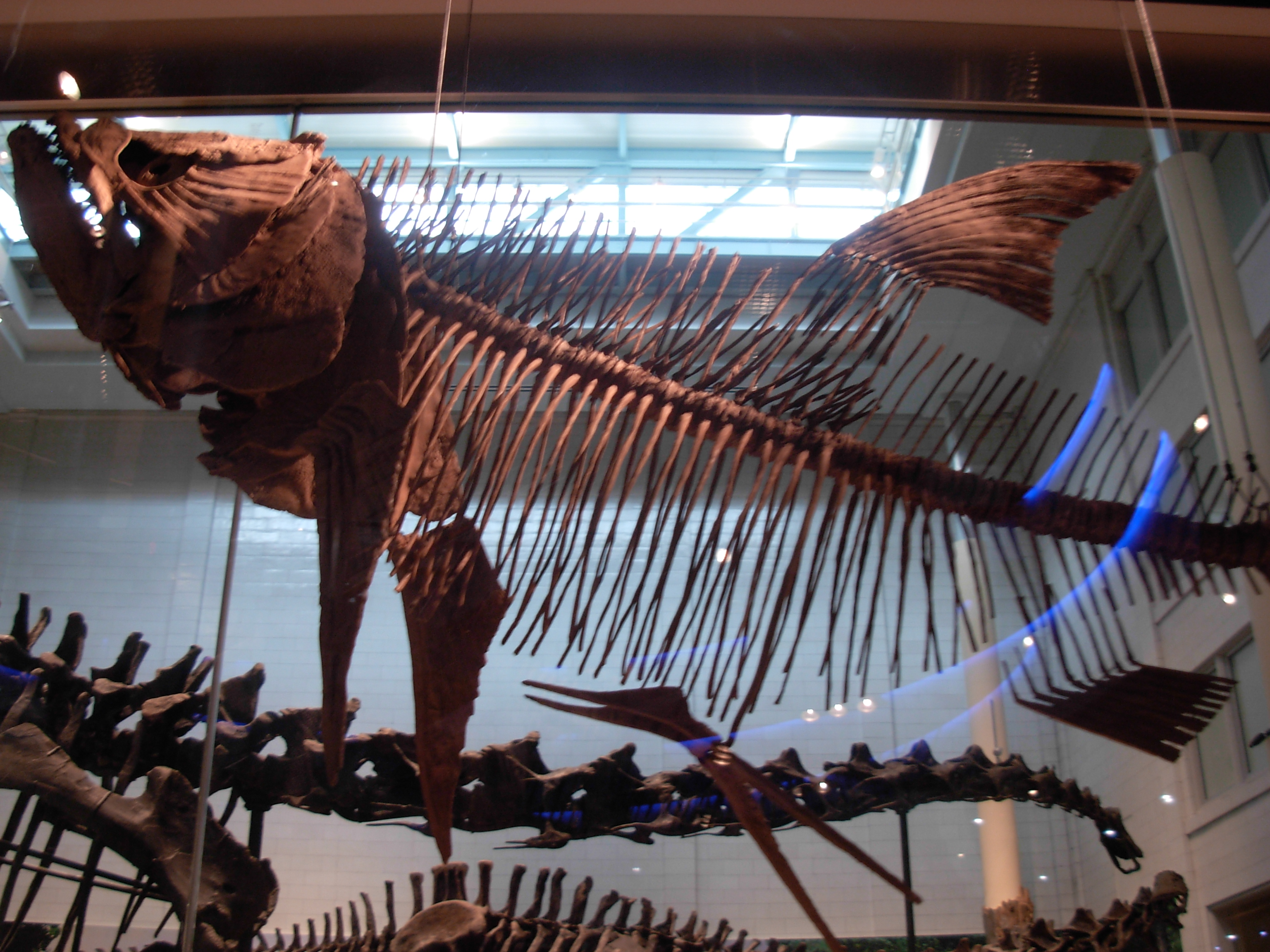
Fossil fish

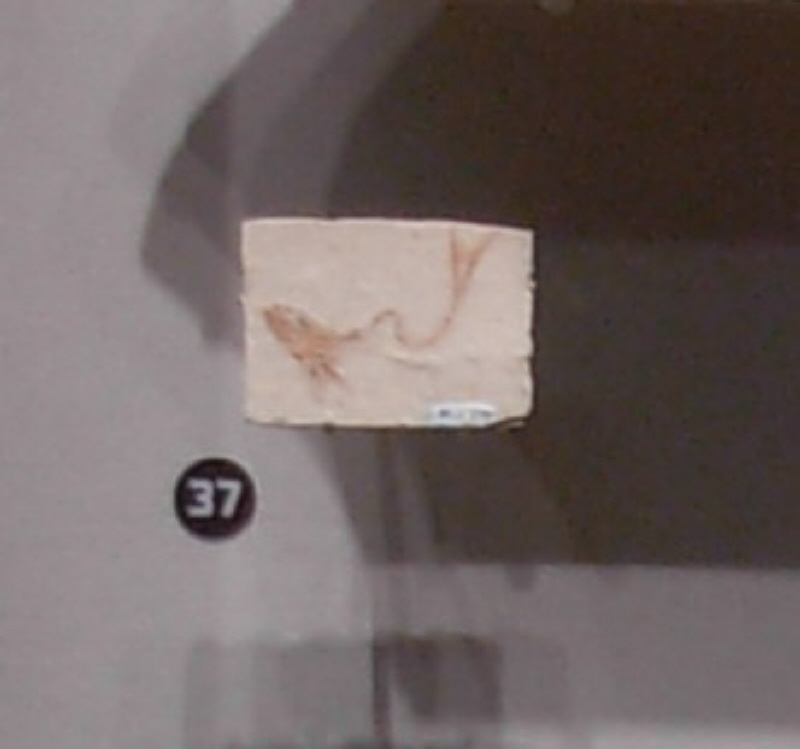
Fossil specimen of Anaethalion knorri from the Solnhofen limestone

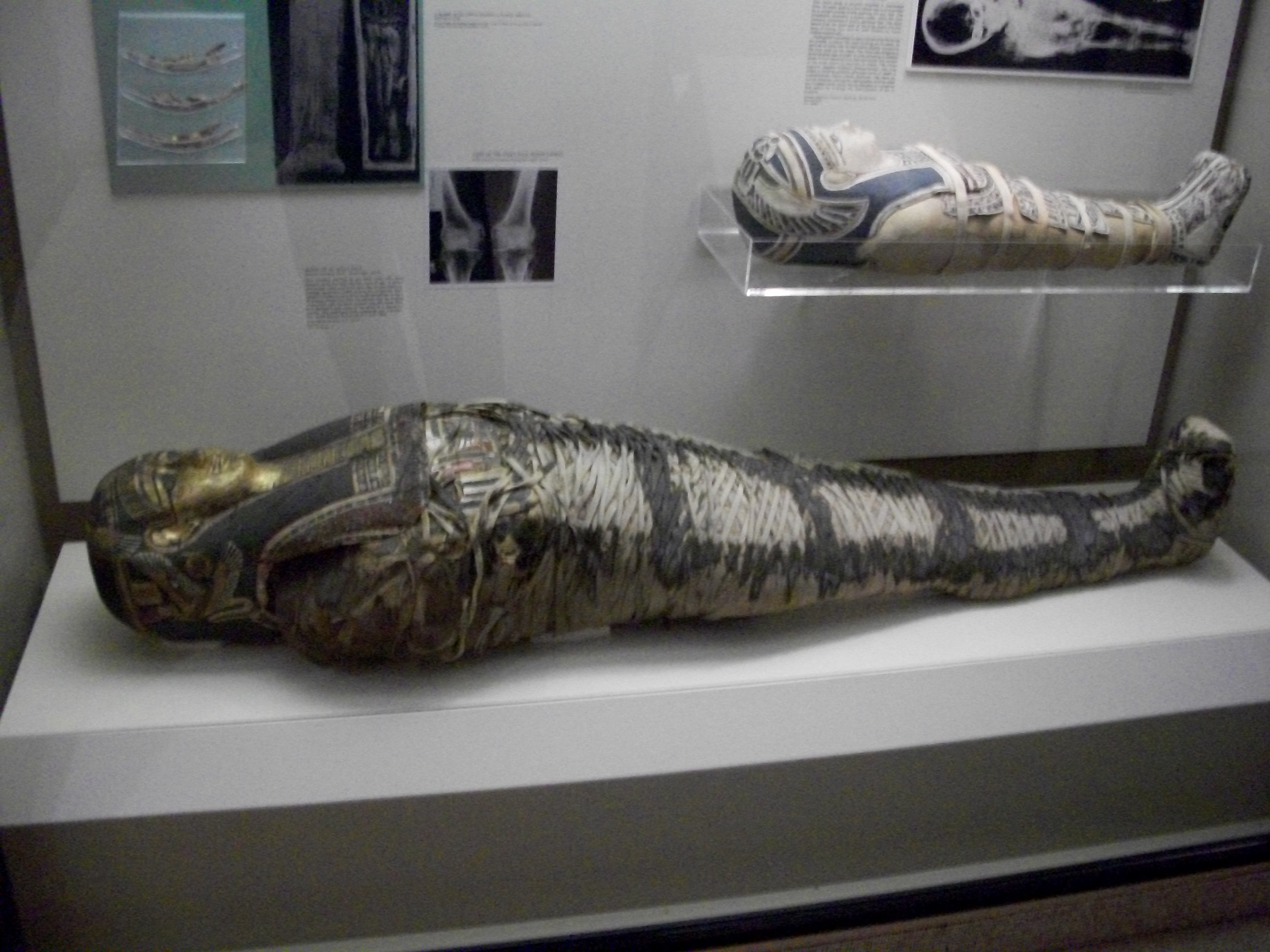
Mummies from the Walton Hall of Ancient Egypt.

Other major exhibits include Hillman Hall of Minerals and Gems, Alcoa Foundation Hall of American Indians, Polar World: Wyckoff Hall of Arctic Life, Walton Hall of Ancient Egypt, Benedum Hall of Geology, Dinosaurs in Their Time, and Powdermill Nature Reserve, established by the museum in 1956 to serve as a field station for long-term studies of natural populations.

The museum's active curatorial departments are: Anthropology, Birds, Botany, Herpetology (Amphibians & Reptiles), Invertebrate Paleontology, Invertebrate Zoology, Mammals, Minerals, Mollusks (Malacology), and Vertebrate Paleontology. In late 2013, however, the museum's parent organization and interim administration eliminated multiple scientific positions, seriously reducing its capacity to conduct original research.

== Scientific publications ==
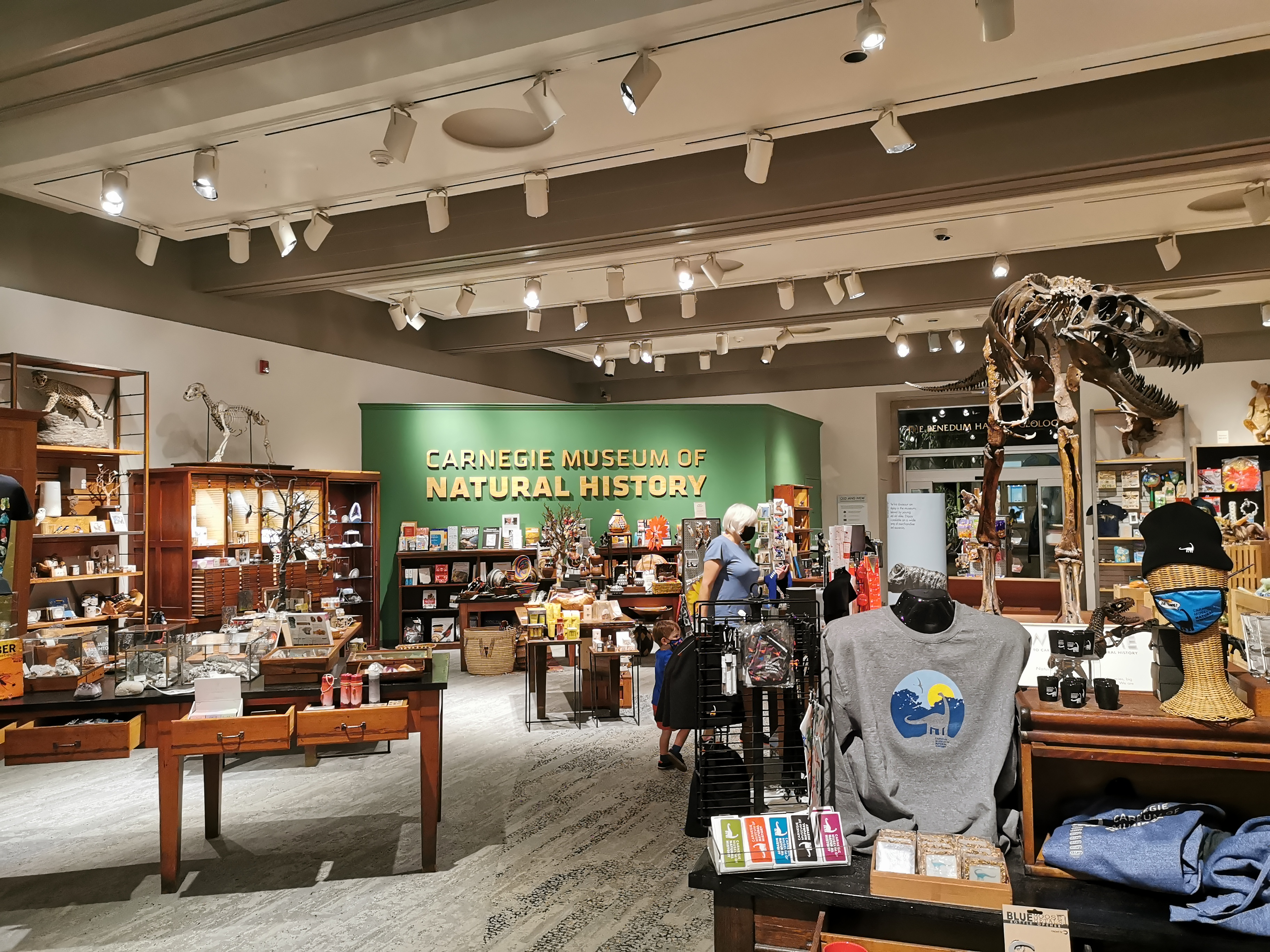
Gift shop inside Carnegie Museum of Natural History

Carnegie Museum of Natural History publishes scholarly journals and books including Annals of Carnegie Museum, which offers peer-reviewed articles in biology, earth sciences, and anthropology; Bulletin of Carnegie Museum of Natural History, offering monographs or collections of related papers from symposia; and Special Publications of Carnegie Museum, documenting special topics or areas of research.

== See also ==
- Carnegie Museums of Pittsburgh
- Carnegie Collection
- List of museums in Pennsylvania
- Alfred Webster Anthony
- Andrey Avinoff
- Rudyerd Boulton
- Andrew Carnegie
- Benjamin Preston Clark
- Mary R. Dawson
- Carl H. Eigenmann
- John Diederich Haseman
- John Bell Hatcher
- William Jacob Holland
- Lion Attacking a Dromedary
- Bradley C. Livezey
- C.J. McCoy
- M. Graham Netting
- Arnold Edward Ortmann
- Albert Schwartz
- Richard Shine
- James L. Swauger
- Walter Edmond Clyde Todd
- Richard Vogt
