= Kamin Science Center =

Science museum in Pittsburgh, Pennsylvania

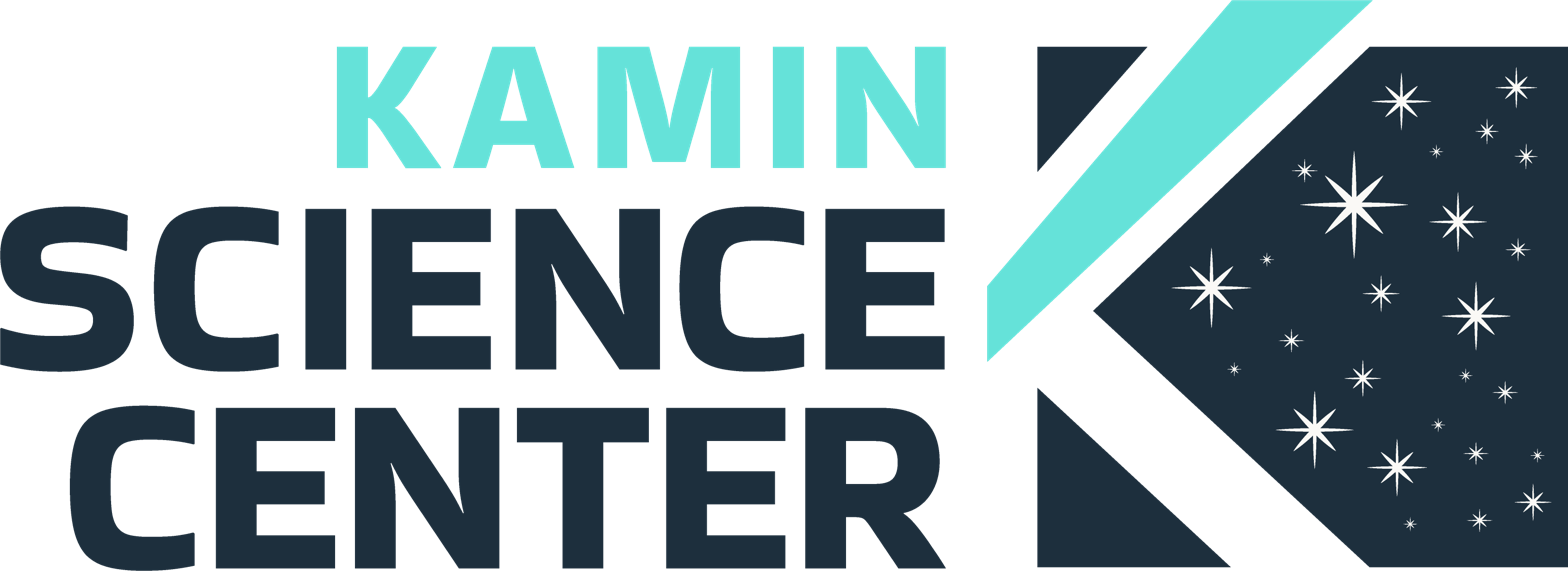

- The Kamin Science Center in 2026

- Location of Kamin Science Center in Pittsburgh
- Former name: Carnegie Science Center
- Established: October 5, 1991
- Location: One Allegheny Ave. Pittsburgh, Pennsylvania
- Coordinates: 40.4456°N 80.0180°W
- Type: Science museum, Technology museum
- Visitors: 476,000
- Director: Jason Brown
- Public transit access: Allegheny
- Parking: On site (paid) and street
- Website: kaminsciencecenter.org

The Kamin Science Center, formerly known as the Carnegie Science Center, is one of the four Carnegie Museums of Pittsburgh, Pennsylvania. It is located in the Chateau neighborhood, across the street from Acrisure Stadium.

== Overview ==
The Kamin Science Center is the most visited museum in Pittsburgh, and is located along the Ohio River on the North Shore. It has five floors of interactive exhibits totaling over 400 exhibits, and attracts nearly 500,000 visitors each year. Among its attractions are the Buhl Planetarium (which features the latest in digital projection technology), the Rangos Giant Theater (promoted as "the biggest screen in Pittsburgh"), a physical home for some of Carnegie Mellon University’s Robot Hall of Fame (in the lobby of the Rangos Giant Cinema), the Miniature Railroad & Village, and the USS Requin (a World War II submarine).

== Updates ==
On November 20, 2017, the Science Center opened the Rangos Giant Cinema, replacing the Rangos Omnimax Theater, one of only about 50 dome theaters in North America. In September 2025, the Science Center unveiled its new name following a $65 million donation from Daniel G. and Carole L. Kamin.

On June 16, 2018, the museum's new PPG Science Pavilion wing opened, allowing the museum to host new exhibits. Included in the addition was the Scaife Exhibit Gallery, which began the Center's practice of hosting touring exhibitions.

On June 19, 2022, the Center closed its long-running 'Roboworld' exhibit. The exhibit included, among others, physical representations of robots inducted into the Robot Hall of Fame, some of which were moved to other locations in the museum after the exhibit's closure.

== History ==
The Science Center's predecessor was the Buhl Planetarium and Institute of Popular Science, which opened on October 24, 1939. The Buhl Planetarium was the fifth major planetarium in the United States, and was popular for several decades. However, by the 1980s it had begun to show signs of age. An expansion was ruled out, so the institute was relocated to the Chateau neighborhood. However, it became apparent to the Buhl Institute that the relocation efforts would require more staffing than they were able to provide. At this point, the Carnegie Institute (under the leadership of Robert Wilburn) stepped in, showing interest in merging with the Buhl Institute. Both parties agreed to the merger in 1987. On October 5, 1989, construction began on the $40 million building, designed by local architect Tasso Katselas, which was renamed Carnegie Science Center as a result of the merger. The Henry Buhl Jr. Planetarium and Observatory was reinvented in this new facility. The Science Center opened in October 1991. On January 23, 2024, Carnegie Science Center announced that they received a $65 million donation from Daniel G. and Carole L. Kamin. In honor of the donation, they announced plans to rename the facility to the Daniel G. and Carole L. Kamin Science Center.

== E-motion cone ==
The E-motion cone is a white-colored, inverted cone which sits atop the Science Center building. It is referred to as the Weather Cone and was designed by New York architect Shashi Caan and lighting designer Matthew Tanteri. It was installed in 2000 with a computerized lighting system. In 2008 a storm damaged the cone, thus it underwent upgrades to its lighting system with an addition of energy-efficient bulbs. At night, it is lit with different colors, signalling the weather forecast from WTAE-TV for the coming day.

Temperature
Red	Warmer
Green	No change
Blue	Cooler

Other
<flashing>	Precipitation
Yellow	Severe weather

== See also ==
- Miniature Railroad & Village
- Carnegie Museums of Pittsburgh
- List of museums in Pennsylvania
- Seddon Bennington - director of the museum from 1994 until 2002
- List of science centers
