= Rector, Pennsylvania =

Unincorporated community in Pennsylvania, United States

Rector
- Unincorporated community
- Location within the U.S. state of Pennsylvania Rector (the United States)
- Coordinates: 40°11′48″N 79°14′19″W
- Country: United States
- State: Pennsylvania
- County: Westmoreland
- GNIS feature ID: 1184747

Rector is a small unincorporated community in Ligonier Township, Westmoreland County, Pennsylvania, United States. As of 2000, the population of Rector was 600. Rector is composed of 26.4 miles^{2}.

Outdoor recreation areas in Rector include Linn Run State Park and Powdermill Nature Reserve.

Rector is part of the Ligonier Valley School District. The Valley School of Ligonier, a private school founded in 1946, serves kindergarten through eighth grade.
