= Trundle Manor =

Curiosity museum in Pittsburgh, Pennsylvania

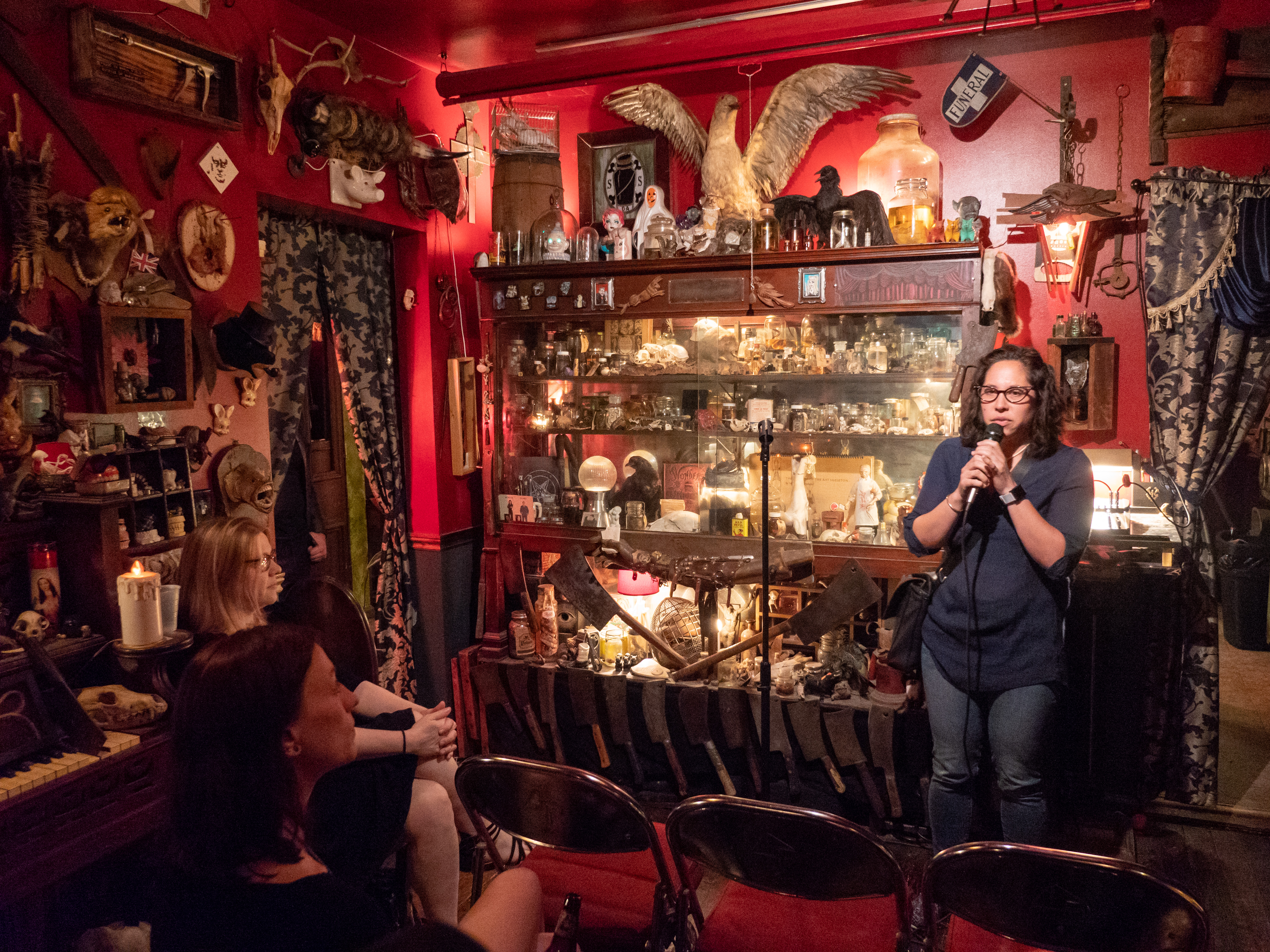
- Trundle Manor's Parlor is filled with items.

- Location within Pittsburgh
- Established: 2007
- Location: 7724 Juniata St; Swissvale, PA 15218
- Coordinates: 40.422890°N 79.880569°W
- Type: Tourist trap
- Founders: Anton and Rachel Miriello
- Parking: On street
- Website: trundlemanor.com

Trundle Manor is a macabre art museum and oddity tourist trap in Swissvale, Pennsylvania, near Pittsburgh. It was founded by artist couple and Anton and Rachel Miriello and houses their personal collection of cryptozoology, vintage taxidermy, and jarred specimens.

When entertaining guests, Anton Miriello and Rachel Miriello go by Mr. Arm and Velda Von Minx respectively. Visitors are asked to donate items to the collection for tour payment. Donations vary from booze, former pets now preserved in jars, to killing implements.

== History ==
The Miriellos acquired the victorian property which became Trundle Manor in 2007. Their fascination with Goth, Steampunk and classic horror films, led the couple to amass a private collection of oddities. The couple’s intrigue with the macabre began in their respective childhoods. Mr. Arm recalls, "I’ve been collecting since I was a little kid". They opened their collection, and house, to the public for tours in 2009. It attracts thousands a year as it has been prominently featured as place of interest in Pittsburgh. Trundle Manor was featured on “MTV’s Extreme Cribs” in 2011. Apart from giving tours, Trundle Manor also organizes, and takes part in various events. It often hosts taxidermy classes, art, and comedy shows. They have taken their collection on the road as a traveling 'creep show'.

== Exhibits ==
=== Olivia's Singing Tumor ===
Olivia’s Singing Tumor is the centerpiece of their human reliquary. It features a large benign tumor encased in a glass jar with a musical contraption that makes it “sing.” The said tumor was donated by a belly dancer who gave it to the couple on the condition that it be put on display.
