= Powdermill Nature Reserve =

Nature reserve in Pennsylvania, US

- IUCN category V (protected landscape/seascape)
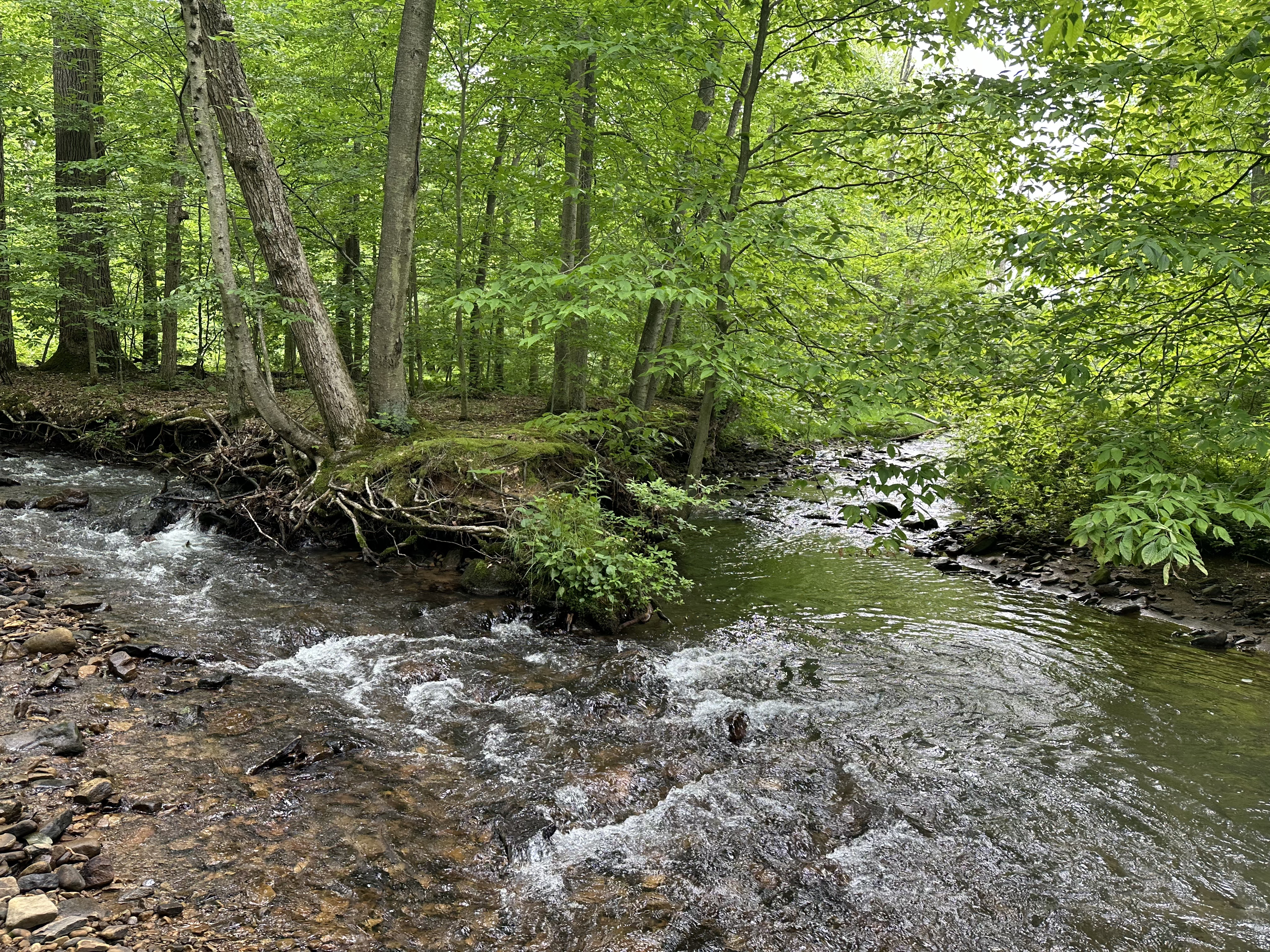
- Confluence of Powdermill Run and White Oak Run at Powdermill Nature Reserve

- Location within Pennsylvania Location within the United States
- Location: Rector, Westmoreland County, Pennsylvania
- Nearest city: Latrobe, Pennsylvania
- Coordinates: 40.15761°N 79.26864°W
- Area: 928.17 ha (2,293.6 acres)
- Established: 1956
- Operator: Carnegie Museum of Natural History

The Powdermill Nature Reserve is an environmental research center that is operated by the Carnegie Museum of Natural History.

== History and notable features ==
Established in 1956, Powdermill serves as a field station for long-term studies of natural populations, and now forms the core of the museum's Center for Biodiversity and Ecosystems. The reserve encompasses 928.17 hectares, which includes forests (~891 hectares), fields (~21 hectares), developed land (~17 hectares), and ponds and streams (~0.36 hectares).

It is located in the Laurel Highlands, 55 miles (89 km) southeast of Pittsburgh near Rector, Pennsylvania.

Powdermill is well known for its avian research and is the longest continually-running bird banding station in the United States. Powdermill has also been contributing radio telemetry data for bird tracking to the Motus Wildlife Tracking System since 2016.
