= List of data deficient reptiles =

- Extinct in the wild (EW): 2 species
- Critically endangered (CR): 432 species
- Endangered (EN): 800 species
- Vulnerable (VU): 627 species
- Near threatened (NT, LR/cd): 566 species
- Least concern (LC): 6,406 species
- Data deficient (DD): 1,502 species
Reptile species (IUCN, 2025.2)
- 10,368 extant species have been evaluated
- 8,866 of those are fully assessed (Note: excludes data deficient evaluations.)
- 6,972 are not threatened at present
- 1,894 to 3,396 are threatened (Note: Threatened comprises CR, EN and VU. Upper estimate additionally includes DD.)
- 34 to 84 are extinct or extinct in the wild:
  - 32 extinct (EX) species (Note: Chart omits extinct (EX) species)
  - 2 extinct in the wild (EW)
  - 50 possibly extinct [CR(PE)]
  - 0 possibly extinct in the wild [CR(PEW)]

As of September 2016, the International Union for Conservation of Nature (IUCN) lists 910 data deficient reptile species. 18% of all evaluated reptile species are listed as data deficient. Of the subpopulations of reptiles evaluated by the IUCN, two species subpopulations have been assessed as data deficient.

This is a complete list of data deficient reptile species evaluated by the IUCN. Species which have data deficient subpopulations (or stocks) are indicated.

== Turtles and tortoises ==
- Leatherback sea turtle (Dermochelys coriacea) (VU)
  - Northeast Indian Ocean subpopulation
  - Southeast Atlantic Ocean subpopulation
- Sicilian pond turtle (Emys trinacris)
- Forest hinge-back tortoise (Kinixys erosa)
- Florida mud turtle (Kinosternon steindachneri)
- Bellinger River sawshelled turtle (Myuchelys georgesi)
- Manning River sawshelled turtle (Myuchelys purvisi)
- Flatback sea turtle (Natator depressus)
- Upemba mud turtle (Pelusios upembae)
- Intermediate musk turtle (Sternotherus intermedius)
- Stripe-necked musk turtle (Sternotherus peltifer)
- Spotted box turtle (Terrapene nelsoni)

== Lizards ==
There are 419 lizard species evaluated as data deficient.

=== Anguidae ===
Slowworms, glass lizards, and alligator lizards.

- Mount Orizaba alligator lizard (Abronia antauges)
- Bogert's arboreal alligator lizard (Abronia bogerti)
- Smoothback arboreal alligator lizard (Abronia leurolepis)
- Mitchell's arboreal alligator lizard (Abronia mitchelli)
- Northern Chiapas arboreal alligator lizard (Abronia ochoterenai)
- Cerro Baul alligator lizard (Abronia ornelasi)
- Ramirez's alligator lizard (Abronia ramirezi)
- Reid's arboreal alligator lizard (Abronia reidi)
- Chihuahuan alligator lizard (Barisia levicollis)
- Isthmian alligator lizard (Gerrhonotus rhombifer)
- Plain-necked glass lizard (Ophisaurus incomptus)

=== Diploglossidae ===
Galliwasps and Ophiodes sp. legless lizards

- Mountain forest galliwasp (Advenus montisilvestris)
- Small-lipped galliwasp (Diploglossus microlepis)
- Siderolamprus adercus
- Atitlán galliwasp (Siderolamprus atitlanensis)
- Ingrid's galliwasp (Siderolamprus ingridae)
- Siderolamprus orobius
- Owen's galliwasp (Siderolamprus owenii)

=== Chameleons ===
- Fito leaf chameleon (Brookesia lambertoni)
- Deceptive chameleon (Calumma fallax)
- Calumma vatosoa
- Necas's chameleon (Chamaeleo necasi)
- Furcifer tuzetae
- Circular-scaled chameleon (Kinyongia gyrolepis)
- Mount Kineti chameleon (Trioceros kinetensis)
- Nyiru montane chameleon (Trioceros ntunte)
- Schoutenden's montane dwarf chameleon (Trioceros schoutedeni)
- Wiedersheim's montane chameleon (Trioceros wiedersheimi)

=== Anoles ===
- Small-fanned bush anole (Anolis alfaroi)
- Alvarez del Toro's anole (Anolis alvarezdeltoroi)
- Anolis baccatus
- Tehuantepec anole (Anolis boulengerianus)
- Caqueta anole (Anolis caquetae)
- Cristifer anole (Anolis cristifer)
- Cope's Veracruz anole (Anolis cymbops)
- Guamuhaya anole (Anolis delafuentei)
- Delta anole (Anolis deltae)
- Duellman's anole (Anolis duellmani)
- Anolis forbesi
- Ibague anole (Anolis ibague)
- Turquino emerald anole (Anolis incredulus)
- Cundinamarca anole (Anolis inderenae)
- Smooth anole (Anolis laevis)
- Anolis lamari
- Anolis lemniscatus
- Black-cheeked bush anole (Anolis macilentus)
- Anolis microlepis
- Miller's anole (Anolis milleri)
- Anolis mirus
- Anolis nigrolineatus
- Pimienta green anole (Anolis oporinus)
- Anolis paravertebralis
- Telimbela anole (Anolis poei)
- Anolis propinquus
- Anolis radulinus
- Sierra Juarez anole (Anolis rubiginosus)
- Santa Marta anole (Anolis santamartae)
- Anolis scapularis
- Anolis schiedii
- Sierra Maestrae bearded anole (Anolis sierramaestrae)
- Anolis simmonsi
- Pacific anole (Anolis subocularis)
- Purial bush anole (Anolis vescus)
- Anolis vicarius
- Anolis wampuensis
- Williams-Mittermeier anole (Anolis williamsmittermeierorum)

=== Gekkonids ===
- Blaesodactylus ambonihazo
- Thickhead rock gecko (Bunopus crassicauda)
- Southern day gecko (Cnemaspis australis)
- Beddome's day gecko (Cnemaspis beddomei)
- Fraser's Hill rock gecko (Cnemaspis flavolineata)
- Giant forest gecko (Cnemaspis gigas)
- Cnemaspis jacobsoni
- Kolhapur day gecko (Cnemaspis kolhapurensis)
- Coastal day gecko (Cnemaspis littoralis)
- Waynaad day gecko (Cnemaspis monticola)
- Ondo forest gecko (Cnemaspis petrodroma)
- Cyrtodactylus aaroni
- Cyrtodactylus arcanus
- Cyrtodactylus feae
- Cyrtodactylus irianjayaensis
- Cyrtodactylus medioclivus
- Cyrtodactylus minor
- Cyrtodactylus murua
- Werner's spider gecko (Cyrtopodion gastrophole)
- Many-scaled gecko (Geckolepis polylepis)
- Oudeman's dtella (Gehyra interstitialis)
- Leopold dtella (Gehyra leopoldi)
- Shanxi gecko (Gekko auriverrucosus)
- Grossman’s gecko (Gekko grossmanni)
- Hemidactylus albivertebralis
- Arnold's leaf-toed gecko (Hemidactylus arnoldi)
- Hemidactylus barbierii
- Hemidactylus lamaensis
- Hemidactylus lemurinus
- López-jurado's leaf-toed gecko (Hemidactylus lopezjuradoi)
- Smith's bent-toed gecko (Hemidactylus malcolmsmithi)
- Moderate leaf-toed gecko (Hemidactylus modestus)
- Hemidactylus porbandarensis
- Hemidactylus pseudomuriceus
- Jerdon's gecko (Hemidactylus subtriedrus)
- Dutumi gecko (Hemidactylus tanganicus)
- Hemiphyllodactylus insularis
- Lepidodactylus buleli
- Bougainville's scaly-toed gecko (Lepidodactylus mutahi)
- Lepidodactylus oortii
- Admiralty gecko (Lepidodactylus pulcher)
- Guadalcanal scaly-toed gecko (Lepidodactylus shebae)
- Luperosaurus corfieldi
- Cuming's flapped-legged gecko (Luperosaurus cumingii)
- Pak Djoko's flap-legged gecko (Luperosaurus iskandari)
- Palawan flapped-legged gecko (Luperosaurus palawanensis)
- Lygodactylus decaryi
- Bunty's dwarf gecko (Lygodactylus grandisonae)
- Lygodactylus grzimeki
- Dar-es-salaam dwarf gecko (Lygodactylus inexpectatus)
- Lygodactylus pauliani
- Scheffler's dwarf gecko (Lygodactylus scheffleri)
- Lygodactylus uluguruensis
- Matoatoa spannringi
- Iranian keel-scaled gecko (Mediodactylus aspratilis)
- Iraqi keel-scaled gecko (Mediodactylus heteropholis)
- Jaz Murian bent-toed gecko (Mediodactylus sagittifer)
- Banded dwarf gecko (Microgecko helenae)
- Nactus kunan
- Vanuatu saw-tailed gecko (Perochirus guentheri)
- Phelsuma borai
- Phelsuma gouldi
- Phelsuma hoeschi
- Phelsuma kely
- Steudner's gecko (Tropiocolotes nubicus)
- Tropiocolotes wolfgangboehmei

=== Wall lizards ===
- Chabanaud's fringe-fingered lizard (Acanthodactylus boueti)
- Acanthodactylus gongrorhynchatus
- Acanthodactylus masirae
- Nilson's spiny-toed lizard (Acanthodactylus nilsoni)
- Steiner's lizard (Darevskia steineri)
- Tanzanian rough-scaled lizard (Ichnotropis tanganicana)
- Brandt's Persian lizard (Iranolacerta brandtii)
- Dasht-e Lut lacerta (Lacerta mostoufii)
- Latastia ornata
- Siebenrock's longtail lizard (Latastia siebenrocki)
- Mesalina ayunensis
- Red sea snake-eyed lizard (Ophisops elbaensis)
- Southern shield-backed lizard (Philochortus rudolfensis)

=== Skinks ===
- Andranovaho skink (Amphiglossus andranovahensis)
- Amphiglossus elongatus
- O'shaughnessy's Madagascar skink (Amphiglossus gastrostictus)
- Amphiglossus mandady
- Amphiglossus meva
- Amphiglossus spilostichus
- Amphiglossus stylus
- Russell's legless skink (Barkudia melanosticta)
- Brachymeles wrighti
- Cryptic litter skink (Caledoniscincus cryptos)
- Chalcides levitoni
- Five-fingered skink (Chalcides pentadactylus)
- Margarita skink (Copeoglossum margaritae)
- Cophoscincopus senegalensis
- Cryptoblepharus richardsi
- Cryptoblepharus xenikos
- New Caledonian ground skink (Geoscincus haraldmeieri)
- Ahl's skink (Emoia ahli)
- Cogger's skink (Emoia coggeri)
- Cyclop's skink (Emoia cyclops)
- Jamur skink (Emoia jamur)
- Kloss' skink (Emoia klossi)
- Admiralty five-striped skink (Emoia mivarti)
- Emoia paniai
- Gans' mabuya (Eutropis gansi)
- Blanford's mabuya (Eutropis innotata)
- Palni Hills ground skink (Kaestlea palnica)
- Zaire three-toed skink (Leptosiaphos blochmanni)
- Leptosiaphos dungeri
- Udzungwa five-toed skink (Leptosiaphos rhomboidalis)
- Greers tree skink (Lioscincus greeri)
- Lipinia albodorsalis
- Werner's lipinia (Lipinia miangensis)
- Black slender tree skink (Lipinia rabori)
- Semper's lipinia (Lipinia semperi)
- Brongersma's lipinia (Lipinia venemai)
- Girard's tree skink (Lipinia vulcania)
- Rusty tree skink (Lipinia zamboangensis)
- Lobulia glacialis
- Lygosoma anguinum
- Carinated slender skink (Lygosoma carinatum)
- Taylor's writhing skink (Lygosoma frontoparietale)
- Lygosoma goaensis
- Pruthi's skink (Lygosoma pruthi)
- Sri Lankan supple skink (Lygosoma singha)
- Vosmer's writhing skink (Lygosoma vosmaeri)
- Ankodabe skink (Madascincus ankodabensis)
- Corn Island skink (Marisora magnacornae)
- Jabiluka dwarf skink (Menetia concinna)
- Mesoscincus altamirani
- Ophiomorus latastii
- Annobón lidless skink (Panaspis annobonensis)
- Wilson's snake-eyed skink (Panaspis wilsoni)
- Papuascincus phaeodes
- Paracontias manify
- Paracontias milloti
- Paracontias tsararano
- Paracontias vermisaurus
- Colima skink (Plestiodon colimensis)
- Chihuahuan skink (Plestiodon multilineatus)
- Northern pigmy skink (Plestiodon parviauriculatus)
- Southern pigmy skink (Plestiodon parvulus)
- Pseudoacontias madagascariensis
- Günther's ristella (Ristella guentheri)
- Travancore ristella (Ristella travancorica)
- Burma smooth skink (Scincella punctatolineata)
- Banded skink (Scincopus fasciatus)
- Sandy limbless skink (Scolecoseps acontias)
- Litipo sand skink (Scolecoseps litipoensis)
- Sphenomorphus annectans
- Negros sphenomorphus (Sphenomorphus arborens)
- Diwata sphenomorphus (Sphenomorphus diwata)
- Sphenomorphus fragosus
- Sphenomorphus laterimaculatus
- Sphenomorphus lawtoni
- Sphenomorphus mimikanus
- Sphenomorphus rarus
- Sphenomorphus rufus
- Taylor's Solomon skink (Sphenomorphus taylori)
- Sphenomorphus transversus
- Sphenomorphus wollastoni
- Wright's sphenomorphus (Sphenomorphus wrighti)
- Bayon's skink (Trachylepis bayonii)
- Betsileo mabuya (Trachylepis betsileana)
- Trachylepis keroanensis
- Trachylepis vezo
- New Britain spiny skink (Tribolonotus annectens)
- Admiralty spiny skink (Tribolonotus brongersmai)
- Giant spiny skink (Tribolonotus ponceleti)
- Tropidophorus latiscutatus
- Vietnascincus rugosus

=== Spectacled lizards ===
- Alopoglossus romaleos
- Anadia bumanguesa
- Peters' anadia (Anadia petersi)
- Andinosaura afrania
- Andinosaura stellae
- Cope's bachia (Bachia pallidiceps)
- Strange pholidobolus (Cercosaura anomala)
- Cercosaura hypnoides
- Kaieteurosaurus hindsi
- Macropholidus ataktolepis
- Petracola labioocularis
- Rahm's sun tegu (Proctoporus rahmi)
- Riama inanis
- Riama vieta

=== Sphaerodactylids ===
- Perija lichen-gecko (Gonatodes lichenosus)
- Lepidoblepharis colombianus
- Lepidoblepharis microlepis
- Pristurus adrarensis
- Peters' rock gecko (Pristurus longipes)
- Pristurus mazbah
- Colombian clawed gecko (Pseudogonatodes furvus)

=== Night lizards ===
- Sumidero tropical night lizard (Lepidophyma chicoasensis)
- Macdougall's tropical night lizard (Lepidophyma dontomasi)
- Liner's tropical night lizard (Lepidophyma lineri)
- Lowe's tropical night lizard (Lepidophyma lowei)
- Yautepec tropical night lizard (Lepidophyma radula)
- Tarascan tropical night lizard (Lepidophyma tarascae)
- Tuxtla tropical night lizard (Lepidophyma tuxtlae)
- Bolson night lizard (Xantusia bolsonae)

=== Worm lizards ===
- Amphisbaena absaberi
- Amphisbaena medemi
- Neglected worm lizard (Amphisbaena neglecta)
- Werner's worm lizard (Amphisbaena polygrammica)
- Shielded worm lizard (Amphisbaena scutigerum)
- Slevin's worm lizard (Amphisbaena slevini)
- Stejneger's worm lizard (Amphisbaena stejnegeri)
- Lindi sharp-snouted worm lizard (Ancylocranium barkeri)
- Kilwa sharp-snouted worm lizard (Ancylocranium ionidesi)
- West African worm lizard (Baikia africana)
- Mpwapwa worm lizard (Chirindia mpwapwaensis)
- Sierra Leone worm lizard (Cynisca degrysi)
- Ghana worm lizard (Cynisca kraussi)
- Cynisca muelleri
- Cynisca rouxae
- Cynisca senegalensis
- Cynisca williamsi
- Loveridgea phylofiniens

=== Neotropical ground lizards ===
- Tarapaca Pacific iguana (Microlophus tarapacensis)
- Ivy whorltail iguana (Stenocercus ivitus)
- Black-spotted whorltail iguana (Stenocercus nigromaculatus)
- Greater ornate whorltail iguana (Stenocercus praeornatus)
- Tropidurus arenarius

=== Dragon lizards ===
- Bocourt's agama (Agama bocourti)
- Orange-lipped forest lizard (Calotes aurantolabium)
- Crystal creek two-line dragon (Diporiphora convergens)
- Bruijni forest dragon (Hypsilurus bruijnii)
- Palau tree dragon (Hypsilurus godeffroyi)
- Hypsilurus nigrigularis
- Hypsilurus ornatus
- Hypsilurus tenuicephalus
- Graham's japalure (Japalura grahami)
- Pseudocophotis sumatrana
- Trapelus jayakari
- Schmitz' agama (Trapelus schmitzi)
- Even-scaled earless dragon (Tympanocryptis uniformis)

=== Phrynosomatids ===
- Rock horned lizard (Phrynosoma ditmarsi)
- Hall’s spiny lizard (Sceloporus halli)
- Sceloporus lemosespinali
- Salvin’s spiny lizard (Sceloporus salvini)
- Sceloporus subpictus
- Tanner’s spiny lizard (Sceloporus tanneri)

=== Varanids ===
- Black tree monitor (Varanus beccarii)
- Golden-spotted tree monitor (Varanus boehmei)
- Biak tree monitor (Varanus kordensis)
- Yellow tree monitor (Varanus reisingeri)
- Varanus telenesetes
- Yemen monitor (Varanus yemenensis)

=== Liolaemids ===
- Liolaemus cinereus
- Duellman's tree iguana (Liolaemus duellmani)
- Liolaemus erroneus
- Liolaemus exploratorum
- Gray tree iguana (Liolaemus griseus)
- Liolaemus hermannunezi
- Liolaemus montanezi
- Phymaturus desuetus
- Phymaturus manuelae

=== Other lizard species ===
- Arabian worm lizard (Agamodon arabicus)
- Flat worm lizard (Agamodon compressus)
- Aprasia clairae
- Wicherina worm-lizard (Aprasia wicherina)
- Opata whiptail (Aspidoscelis opatae)
- Ukinga girdled lizard (Cordylus ukingensis)
- Southern Honduran spiny-tailed iguana (Ctenosaura praeocularis)
- Five-keeled spiny-tailed iguana (Ctenosaura quinquecariniata)
- Smith's blind skink (Dibamus smithi)
- Iranian fat tailed gecko (Eublepharis angramainyu)
- Chaitzam's ameiva (Holcosus chaitzami)
- Long-necked northern leaf-tailed gecko (Orraya occultus)
- Short worm lizard (Pachycalamus brevis)
- Baur's leaf-toed gecko (Phyllodactylus baurii)
- Cerro Illescas gecko (Phyllodactylus clinatus)
- Rio Marquez Valley gecko (Phyllodactylus paucituberculatus)
- Jacqueline’s bush anole (Polychrus jacquelinae)
- Tarentola rudis
- Chin-spotted knob-scaled lizard (Xenosaurus phalaroanthereon)
- Zonosaurus maramaintso

== Snakes ==
There are 480 snake species evaluated as data deficient.

=== Pseudoxyrhophiids ===
- Ithycyphus blanci
- Liophidium apperti
- Liophidium maintikibo
- Madagascar three-lined snake (Liophidium trilineatum)
- Phisalixella iarakaensis

=== Typhlopid blind snakes ===
- Acutotyphlops banaorum
- Red blind snake (Acutotyphlops infralabialis)
- Kunua blind snake (Acutotyphlops kunuaensis)
- Acutotyphlops solomonis
- Blanford's blind-snake (Afrotyphlops blanfordii)
- Kakamega blind-snake (Afrotyphlops kaimosae)
- Mann's worm snake (Afrotyphlops manni)
- Kenyan dwarf blind-snake (Afrotyphlops nanus)
- Rondo worm snake (Afrotyphlops rondoensis)
- Amerotyphlops amoipira
- Letheobia episcopus
- Eritrean blind snake (Letheobia erythraea)
- Liberia worm snake (Letheobia leucostictus)
- Zanzibar beaked snake (Letheobia pallida)
- Pemba gracile blind-snake (Letheobia pembana)
- Ramphotyphlops aluensis
- Arboreal blind snake (Ramphotyphlops angusticeps)
- Beck's blind snake (Ramphotyphlops becki)
- Cuming's blind snake (Ramphotyphlops cumingii)
- Lorenz's blind snake (Ramphotyphlops lorenzi)
- Small-headed blind snake (Ramphotyphlops mansuetus)
- Marx's worm snake (Ramphotyphlops marxi)
- Manukwari blind snake (Ramphotyphlops similis)
- Salawati blindsnake (Ramphotyphlops supranasalis)
- Loyalty Islands blind snake (Ramphotyphlops willeyi)
- Andasibe blind snake (Typhlops andasibensis)
- Gunther's blind snake (Typhlops bothriorhynchus)
- Taylor's worm snake (Typhlops canlaonensis)
- Light-collared blind snake (Typhlops collaris)
- Comoro worm snake (Typhlops comorensis)
- Conrad's worm snake (Typhlops conradi)
- Typhlops domerguei
- Typhlops etheridgei
- Belgaum worm snake (Typhlops exiguus)
- File worm snake (Typhlops filiformis)
- Gia Dinh blind snake (Typhlops giandinhensis)
- Cebu blind snake (Typhlops hypogius)
- Sumatra worm snake (Typhlops hypsobothrius)
- Klemmer's blind snake (Typhlops klemmeri)
- Koekkoek's blind snake (Typhlops koekkoeki)
- Koshun worm snake (Typhlops koshunensis)
- Madagascar worm snake (Typhlops madagascariensis)
- Manila blind snake (Typhlops manilae)
- Meszoely's blind snake (Typhlops meszoelyi)
- Boettger's worm snake (Typhlops mucronatus)
- Oates's blind snake (Typhlops oatesii)
- Typhlops ocularis
- Ozaki's blind snake (Typhlops ozakiae)
- Tanga blind-snake (Typhlops platyrhynchus)
- Typhlops rajeryi
- Reuters blind snake (Typhlops reuteri)
- Roxane's blind snake (Typhlops roxaneae)
- Brown blind snake (Typhlops ruficaudus)
- Siamese blind snake (Typhlops siamensis)
- Socotra worm snake (Typhlops socotranus)
- Peter's worm snake (Typhlops tenuicollis)
- Thurston's worm snake (Typhlops thurstoni)
- Trang blind snake (Typhlops trangensis)
- Iranian worm snake (Typhlops wilsoni)
- Xenotyphlops mocquardi

=== Vipers ===
- Tai hairy bush viper (Atheris hirsuta)
- Cerrophidion petlalcalensis
- Autlàn rattlesnake (Crotalus lannomi)
- Tancitaro rattlesnake (Crotalus tancitarensis)
- Hughes' saw-scaled viper (Echis hughesi)
- Joger's saw-scaled viper (Echis jogeri)
- Cherlin's saw-scaled viper (Echis megalocephalus)
- Likiang pit viper (Gloydius monticola)
- Toba pit viper (Popeia toba)
- Western hognose viper (Porthidium hespere)
- Ujarran hognosed pit viper (Porthidium volcanicum)
- Kaulback's lance-headed pitviper (Protobothrops kaulbacki)
- Mao-lan pit viper (Protobothrops maolanensis)
- Sichuan pit viper (Sinovipera sichuanensis)
- Medo pit viper (Viridovipera medoensis)

=== Dipsadids ===
- Oaxacan burrowing snake (Adelphicos latifasciatum)
- Bolivian burrowing snake (Apostolepis dorbignyi)
- Goias burrowing snake (Apostolepis goiasensis)
- Apostolepis polylepis
- Apostolepis tenuis
- Atractus acheronius
- Atractus apophis
- Atractus atratus
- Atractus avernus
- Atractus ayeush
- Bolivian ground snake (Atractus balzani)
- Two-lined ground snake (Atractus biseriatus)
- Atractus boulengerii
- Atractus darienensis
- Atractus depressiocellus
- Atractus echidna
- Ecuadorean ground snake (Atractus ecuadorensis)
- Filippi's ground snake (Atractus favae)
- Atractus hostilitractus
- Atractus imperfectus
- Indistinct ground snake (Atractus indistinctus)
- Lehmann's ground snake (Atractus lehmanni)
- Atractus macondo
- Blackbelly ground snake (Atractus melanogaster)
- Atractus mijaresi
- Atractus nasutus
- Black-ventered ground snake (Atractus nigriventris)
- Fat ground snake (Atractus obesus)
- Bignose ground snake (Atractus obtusirostris)
- Hispanic ground snake (Atractus oculotemporalis)
- Atractus paravertebralis
- Little-scaled ground snake (Atractus pauciscutatus)
- Peru ground snake (Atractus peruvianus)
- Atractus tamaensis
- Variegated ground snake (Atractus variegatus)
- Vertebral ground snake (Atractus vertebralis)
- Striped ground snake (Atractus vertebrolineatus)
- Clelia hussami
- Coniophanes alvarezi
- Coniophanes joanae
- Coniophanes lateritius
- Coniophanes melanocephalus
- Michoacán striped snake (Coniophanes sarae)
- Conophis morai
- Cryophis hallbergi
- Colombian frog-eating snake (Diaphorolepis laevis)
- Dipsas baliomelas
- Dipsas maxillaris
- Tropical snail-eater (Dipsas sanctijoannis)
- Pinchinda snake (Emmochliophis fugleri)
- Mexican longtail snake (Enulius oligostichus)
- Eridiphas marcosensis
- Erythrolamprus andinus
- Erythrolamprus problematicus
- Pyburn's tropical forest snake (Erythrolamprus pyburni)
- Erythrolamprus subocularis
- Eutrachelophis steinbachi
- Geophis bellus
- Betanien earth snake (Geophis betaniensis)
- Mexican plateau earth snake (Geophis bicolor)
- Blanchard's earth snake (Geophis blanchardi)
- Veracruz earth snake (Geophis chalybeus)
- Panamenian earth snake (Geophis championi)
- Savage's earth snake (Geophis downsi)
- Dunn's earth snake (Geophis dunni)
- Sierra Coalcoman earth snake (Geophis incomptus)
- Isthmian earth snake (Geophis isthmicus)
- Geophis juarezi
- Widecollar earth snake (Geophis laticollaris)
- Potosí earth snake (Geophis latifrontalis)
- Michoacán earth snake (Geophis maculiferus)
- Black-banded earth snake (Geophis nigrocinctus)
- Geophis petersii
- Pyburn's earth snake (Geophis pyburni)
- Red earth snake (Geophis russatus)
- Sallae's earth snake (Geophis sallaei)
- Siebold's earth snake (Geophis sieboldi)
- Tarascan earth snake (Geophis tarascae)
- Dunn's water snake (Hydromorphus dunni)
- Rio Verde nightsnake (Hypsiglena tanzeri)
- Blunt-headed vine snake (Imantodes phantasma)
- Vanzolini's ground snake (Lygophis vanzolinii)
- Alemán's snail-eater (Plesiodipsas perijanensis)
- Pliocercus wilmarai
- Oaxacan graceful brown snake (Rhadinaea bogertorum)
- Veracruz graceful brown snake (Rhadinaea cuneata)
- Forbes' graceful brown snake (Rhadinaea forbesi)
- Gaige's pine forest snake (Rhadinaea gaigeae)
- Macdougall's graceful brown snake (Rhadinaea macdougalli)
- Myers' graceful brown snake (Rhadinaea myersi)
- Guerreran pine woods snake (Rhadinaea omiltemana)
- Common graceful brown snake (Rhadinaea pulveriventris)
- Pueblan graceful brown snake (Rhadinaea quinquelineata)
- Hannstein's spot-lipped snake (Rhadinella hannsteini)
- Rhadinella kanalchutchan
- Rhadinophanes monticola
- Dunn's saphenophis snake (Saphenophis antioquiensis)
- Atahuallpa saphenophis snake (Saphenophis atahuallpae)
- Saphenophis tristriatus
- Dunn's snail sucker (Sibon dunni)
- Sibon linearis
- Sibon perissostichon
- Synophis calamitus
- Lasalle's fishing snake (Synophis lasallei)
- Slender snake (Tachymenis tarmensis)
- Taeniophallus nebularis
- Thamnodynastes ceibae
- Mocquard's swamp snake (Tretanorhinus mocquardi)
- Barbour's tropical ground snake (Trimetopon barbouri)
- Tropidodipsas repleta
- Urotheca dumerilli
- Urotheca myersi

=== Shield-tailed snakes ===
- Lined thorntail snake (Platyplectrurus trilineatus)
- Kerala burrowing snake (Plectrurus aureus)
- Karnataka burrowing snake (Plectrurus canaricus)
- Günther's burrowing snake (Plectrurus guentheri)
- Cardamom Hills earth snake (Rhinophis fergusonianus)
- Beddome's earth snake (Uropeltis beddomii)
- Brougham's earth snake (Uropeltis broughami)
- Sirumalai Hills earth snake (Uropeltis dindigalensis)
- Günther's earth snake (Uropeltis liura)
- Anaimalai earth snake (Uropeltis macrorhynchus)
- Spotted earth snake (Uropeltis maculatus)
- Boulenger's earth snake (Uropeltis myhendrae)
- Southern earth snake (Uropeltis nitidus)
- Shieldtail earth snake (Uropeltis petersi)

=== Elapids ===
- Arafura sea snake (Aipysurus tenuis)
- Beddome's coral snake (Calliophis beddomei)
- Spotted coral snake (Calliophis gracilis)
- Collared whip snake (Demansia torquata)
- Sepic beaked sea snake (Enhydrina zweifeli)
- Faint-banded sea snake (Hydrophis belcheri)
- Peters' sea snake (Hydrophis bituberculatus)
- Gunther's sea snake (Hydrophis cantoris)
- Fine-spined sea snake (Hydrophis czeblukovi)
- Plain sea snake (Hydrophis inornatus)
- Kloss' sea snake (Hydrophis klossi)
- Laboute's sea snake (Hydrophis laboutei)
- Bombay sea snake (Hydrophis mamillaris)
- Hydrophis melanocephalus
- Black-banded sea snake (Hydrophis melanosoma)
- Daudin's sea snake (Hydrophis nigrocinctus)
- Hydrophis pachycercos
- Hydrophis parviceps
- Kalimantan sea snake (Hydrophis sibauensis)
- Collared sea snake (Hydrophis stricticollis)
- West coast black-headed sea snake (Hydrophis torquatus)
- Estuarine sea snake (Hydrophis vorisi)
- Wall's sea snake (Hydrophis walli)
- Bighead sea snake (Kolpophis annandalei)
- Bogert's coral snake (Micrurus bogerti)
- Micrurus camilae
- Micrurus nebularis
- Micrurus oligoanellatus
- Micrurus pachecogili
- Peters' coral snake (Micrurus petersi)
- Micrurus tamaulipensis
- Arafura smooth sea snake (Parahydrophis mertoni)
- Bougainville coral snake (Parapistocalamus hedigeri)
- Anomalous sea snake (Thalassophis anomalus)
- Setekwa river forest snake (Toxicocalamus grandis)
- Misima Island forest snake (Toxicocalamus misimae)
- Toxicocalamus pachysomus
- Spotted forest snake (Toxicocalamus spilolepidotus)

=== Calamariids ===
- Calamaria abramovi
- Padang reed snake (Calamaria abstrusa)
- Bengkulu reed snake (Calamaria alidae)
- Battersby's reed snake (Calamaria battersbyi)
- Boeseman's reed snake (Calamaria boesemani)
- Buch's reed snake (Calamaria buchi)
- Calamaria concolor
- Thick reed snake (Calamaria crassa)
- Döderlein's reed snake (Calamaria doederleini)
- Eiselt's reed snake (Calamaria eiselti)
- Forcart's reed snake (Calamaria forcarti)
- Gia Lai reed snake (Calamaria gialaiensis)
- Slender reed snake (Calamaria gracilima)
- Javanese reed snake (Calamaria javanica)
- Calamaria joloensis
- White-striped reed snake (Calamaria lateralis)
- Calamaria lautensis
- Lumholz's reed snake (Calamaria lumholtzi)
- Stripe-necked reed snake (Calamaria margaritophora)
- Mechel's reed snake (Calamaria mecheli)
- Palawan worm snake (Calamaria palavanensis)
- Pfeffer's reed snake (Calamaria pfefferi)
- Rebentisch's reed snake (Calamaria rebentischi)
- Sang's reed snake (Calamaria sangi)
- Thanh's reed snake (Calamaria thanhi)
- Ulmer's reed snake (Calamaria ulmeri)
- Sumatra Etheridge snake (Etheridgeum pulchrum)

=== Lamprophiids ===
- Dunger's file snake (Gonionotophis egbensis)
- Gabou file snake (Gonionotophis gabouensis)
- Hellmich's wolf snake (Lycophidion hellmichi)
- Lycophidion pembanum

=== Indo-Australian water snakes ===
- Brachyorrhos jobiensis
- Cantoria annulata
- Sumatran mud snake (Enhydris albomaculata)
- Reuss' mud snake (Enhydris alternans)
- Bennett's mud snake (Enhydris bennettii)
- Sind River Snake (Enhydris chanardi)
- Kapuas mud snake (Enhydris gyii)
- Indian water snake (Enhydris indica)
- Tay Minh water snake (Enhydris innominata)
- Bangkok mud snake (Enhydris jagorii)
- Blanford's mud snake (Enhydris maculosa)
- Boulenger's water snake (Enhydris matannensis)
- Pahang mud snake (Enhydris pahangensis)
- Blackwater mud snake (Enhydris punctata)
- Mamberamo river water snake (Heurnia ventromaculata)

=== Colubrids ===
- Aeluroglena cucullata
- Blyth's reticulated snake (Blythia reticulata)
- Beddome's cat snake (Boiga beddomei)
- Bengkulu cat snake (Boiga bengkuluensis)
- Travancore cat snake (Boiga dightoni)
- Many-banded tree snake (Boiga multifasciata)
- Boiga ranawanei
- Boiga wallachi
- Chironius flavopictus
- Enggano rat snake (Coelognathus enganensis)
- Sharma's racer (Coluber bholanathi)
- Graceful racer (Coluber gracilis)
- Sarso Island racer (Coluber insulanus)
- Thomas' racer (Coluber thomasi)
- Nguyenvansang's snake (Colubroelaps nguyenvansangi)
- Hampton's green snake (Cyclophiops hamptoni)
- Dendrelaphis chairecacos
- Dendrelaphis hollinrakei
- Papuan treesnake (Dendrelaphis papuensis)
- Underwood's bronzeback tree snake (Dendrelaphis underwoodi)
- Scarce bridal snake (Dryocalamus gracilis)
- Eirenis rechingeri
- Eirenis thospitis
- Ficimia ramirezi
- Ficimia ruspator
- Ficimia variegata
- Geagras redimitus
- Spatula-toothed snake (Iguanognathus werneri)
- Lampropeltis catalinensis
- Lampropeltis webbi
- Leptophis santamartensis
- Himalayan stripe-necked snake (Liopeltis rappi)
- Cardamom Mountains wolf snake (Lycodon cardamomensis)
- Lycodon fausti
- Lycodon ferroni
- Gongshan wolf snake (Lycodon gongshan)
- Kundu's wolf snake (Lycodon kundui)
- Pink large-toothed snake (Lycodon rosozonatus)
- Lycodon solivagus
- Boehme's wolf snake (Lycodon synaptor)
- Manila wolf snake (Lycodon tessellatus)
- Lytorhynchus gasperetti
- Macroprotodon abubakeri
- Masticophis barbouri
- Tana delta smooth snake (Meizodon krameri)
- Myer's snake (Myersophis alpestris)
- Annam kukri snake (Oligodon annamensis)
- Durheim's kukri snake (Oligodon durheimi)
- Namsang kukri snake (Oligodon erythrorhachis)
- Hampton's kukri snake (Oligodon hamptoni)
- Jintakune's kukri snake (Oligodon jintakunei)
- Angel's kukri snake (Oligodon macrurus)
- Morice's kukri snake (Oligodon moricei)
- Luding kukri snake (Oligodon multizonatus)
- Nikhil's kukri snake (Oligodon nikhili)
- Ningshaan kukri snake (Oligodon ningshaanensis)
- Petronella's kukri snake (Oligodon petronellae)
- Pulau Weh kukri snake (Oligodon praefrontalis)
- Saint Giron's kukri snake (Oligodon saintgironsi)
- Oligodon templetoni
- Oligodon torquatus
- Travancore kukri snake (Oligodon travancoricus)
- Dark-spined kukri snake (Oligodon vertebralis)
- Slowinski's corn snake (Pantherophis slowinskii)
- Rhinocheilus etheridgei
- Aden black-headed snake (Rhynchocalamus arabicus)
- Rhynchocalamus barani
- Günther's many-tooth snake (Sibynophis bistrigatus)
- Mograbin diadem snake (Spalerosophis dolichospilus)
- Stegonotus florensis
- Barbour's centipede snake (Tantilla albiceps)
- Andes centipede snake (Tantilla andinista)
- Baird's black-headed snake (Tantilla bairdi)
- Briggs' centipede snake (Tantilla briggsi)
- Michoacán centipede snake (Tantilla cascadae)
- Tantilla hendersoni
- Tantilla johnsoni
- Black centipede snake (Tantilla nigra)
- Oaxacan centipede snake (Tantilla oaxacae)
- Tantilla robusta
- Tantilla sertula
- Slavens' centipede snake (Tantilla slavensi)
- Striped centipede snake (Tantilla striata)
- Volcan tacana centipede snake (Tantilla tayrae)
- Tantilla tecta
- Three-lined centipede snake (Tantilla triseriata)
- Italian Aesculapian snake (Zamenis lineatus)
- Persian rat snake (Zamenis persica)

=== Keelbacks ===
- Fox's mountain meadow snake (Adelophis foxi)
- Anoplohydrus aemulans
- Cope's rough-side (Aspidura copei)
- Andrea's keelback (Hebius andreae)
- Hebius arqus
- Mountain keelback (Hebius atemporale)
- Bridled keelback (Hebius frenatum)
- Groundwater's keelback (Hebius groundwateri)
- Gunung Kerinchi keelback (Hebius kerinciense)
- Viper-like keelback (Hebius viperinum)
- Sikkim keelback (Herpetoreas sieboldii)
- Kinabalu water snake (Hydrablabes praefrontalis)
- Cuc's mountain snake (Opisthotropis cucae)
- Jacob's stream snake (Opisthotropis jacobi)
- Spotted mountain stream snake (Opisthotropis maculosa)
- Maxwell's mountain keelback (Opisthotropis maxwelli)
- Smith's mountain keelback (Opisthotropis spenceri)
- Tam Dao stream snake (Opisthotropis tamdaoensis)
- Annam keelback (Parahelicops annamensis)
- Boonsong's keelback (Parahelicops boonsongi)
- Chapa flat-nosed snake (Pararhabdophis chapaensis)
- Angel's keelback (Rhabdophis angeli)
- Rhabdophis barbouri
- Black-barred keelback (Rhabdophis callichroma)
- Javanese keelback (Rhabdophis chrysargoides)
- Thamnophis nigronuchalis
- Thamnophis rossmani
- Tropidonophis dolasii
- Moluccan keelback (Tropidonophis elongatus)
- Halmahera keelback (Tropidonophis punctiventris)
- Burmese keelback water snake (Xenochrophis bellulus)

=== Burrowing asps ===
- Taita Hills purple-glossed snake (Amblyodipsas teitana)
- Michell's quill-snouted snake (Xenocalamus michellii)

=== Dawn blind snakes ===
- Ecuador blind snake (Anomalepis flavapices)
- Mexican blind snake (Anomalepis mexicanus)
- Costa Rica blind snake (Helminthophis frontalis)
- Liotyphlops argaleus
- Liotyphlops haadi
- Sao Paulo blind snake (Liotyphlops schubarti)

=== Thread snakes ===
- Manda flesh-pink blind snake (Epacrophis boulengeri)
- Drewes' worm snake (Epacrophis drewsi)
- Epictia alfredschmidti
- Dark blind snake (Epictia melanurus)
- Peru blind snake (Epictia peruviana)
- Red-lined blind snake (Epictia rubrolineata)
- Eleven-striped blind snake (Epictia undecimstriata)
- Socotra Island blind snake (Leptotyphlops filiformis)
- Howell's worm snake (Leptotyphlops howelli)
- Mount Kenya worm snake (Leptotyphlops keniensis)
- Boulenger's blind snake (Leptotyphlops macrurus)
- Mbanja worm snake (Leptotyphlops mbanjensis)
- Wilson's blind snake (Leptotyphlops wilsoni)
- Myriopholis burii
- Gambia blind snake (Myriopholis natatrix)
- Yemen blind snake (Myriopholis yemenicus)
- Angolan beaked thread snake (Namibiana rostrata)
- Rena affinis
- Michoacán slender blind snake (Rena bressoni)
- Parker's worm snake (Rhinoleptus parkeri)
- Tricheilostoma broadleyi
- Tricheilostoma greenwelli
- Caqueta blind snake (Trilepida brevissima)
- Santander blind snake (Trilepida nicefori)

=== Gerrhopilids ===
- Beddome's worm snake (Gerrhopilus beddomii)
- Javanese blind snake (Gerrhopilus bisubocularis)
- Flower's blind snake (Gerrhopilus floweri)
- Fred Parkers blindsnake (Gerrhopilus fredparkeri)
- Gerrhopilus hades
- Mcdowell's blindsnake (Gerrhopilus mcdowelli)
- Few-scaled worm snake (Gerrhopilus oligolepis)
- Tindall's worm snake (Gerrhopilus tindalli)

=== Other snake species ===
- Kinabalu giant blind snake (Anomochilus monticola)
- Sumatran giant blind snake (Anomochilus weberi)
- Aru cylinder snake (Cylindrophis aruensis)
- Engkari pipe snake (Cylindrophis engkariensis)
- Blanford's pipe snake (Cylindrophis lineatus)
- Smith's rough water snake (Fimbrios smithi)
- Stanley's slug snake (Pareas stanleyi)
- Plagiopholis delacouri
- Yunnan mountain snake (Plagiopholis unipostocularis)
- Baram false cobra (Pseudoxenodon baramensis)
- Jacobson's false cobra (Pseudoxenodon jacobsonii)
- Xenophidion acanthognathus
- Schäfer's spiny-jawed snake (Xenophidion schaeferi)
- Günther's mountain snake (Xylophis stenorhynchus)

== See also ==
- Lists of IUCN Red List data deficient species
- List of least concern reptiles
- List of near threatened reptiles
- List of vulnerable reptiles
- List of endangered reptiles
- List of critically endangered reptiles
- List of recently extinct reptiles
