= Calamaria mecheli =

Conservation status
- Data Deficient (IUCN 3.1)

Scientific classification
- Kingdom: Animalia
- Phylum: Chordata
- Class: Reptilia
- Order: Squamata
- Suborder: Serpentes
- Family: Colubridae
- Genus: Calamaria
- Species: C. mecheli

Binomial name
- Calamaria mecheli Schenkel, 1901
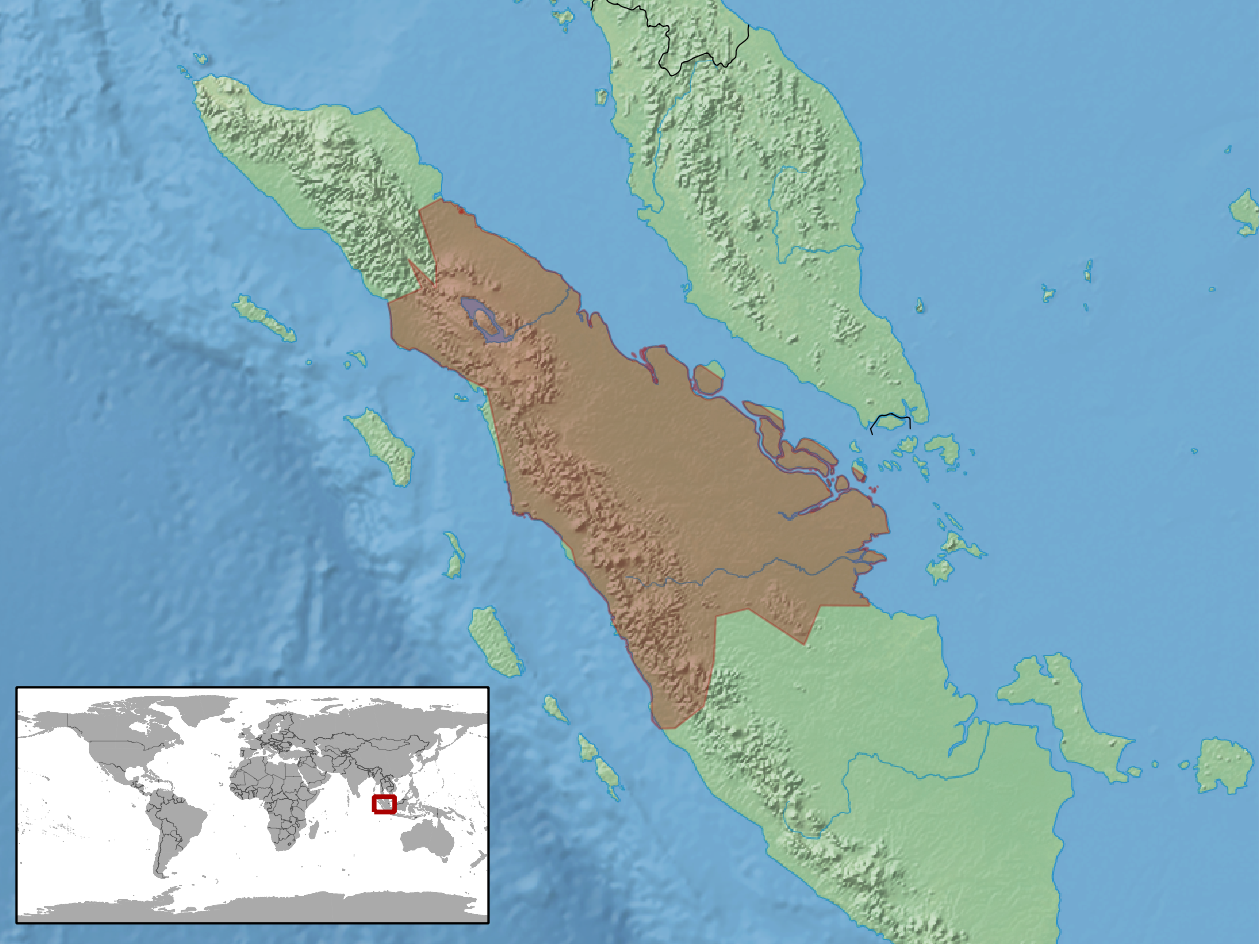

Species of snake

Calamaria mecheli, also known commonly as Mechel's reed snake, is a species of snake in the subfamily Calamariinae of the family Colubridae. The species is endemic to the island of Sumatra in Indonesia.

== Etymology ==
The specific name, mecheli, is in honor of Mr. A. von Mechel who collected the holotype.

== Description ==
A small species of snake, Calamaria mecheli may attain a total length (tail included) of 25 cm (9.8 in).

== Habitat ==
The preferred natural habitat of Calamaria mecheli is forest, at altitudes as high as 400 m (1,300 ft).

== Behavior ==
Calamaria mecheli is terrestrial and semifossorial.

== Reproduction ==
Calamaria mecheli is oviparous.
