= Ancylocranium =

Scientific classification
- Kingdom: Animalia
- Phylum: Chordata
- Class: Reptilia
- Order: Squamata
- Clade: Amphisbaenia
- Family: Amphisbaenidae
- Genus: Ancylocranium; Parker, 1942

Species
- Three, see text.

Genus of amphisbaenians

Ancylocranium is a genus of amphisbaenians, commonly known as sharp-snouted worm lizards, in the family Amphisbaenidae. Three species are placed in this genus, which is endemic to eastern Africa and the Horn of Africa.

== Species ==
The following species are recognized as being valid.

- Ancylocranium barkeri Loveridge, 1946 – Lindi sharp-snouted worm lizard
- Ancylocranium ionidesi Loveridge, 1955 – Kilwa sharp-snouted worm lizard
- Ancylocranium somalicum (Scortecci, 1930) – Somali sharp-snouted worm lizard

Nota bene: A binomial authority in parentheses indicates that the species was originally described in a genus other than Ancylocranium.
