= Calamaria abramovi =

Conservation status
- Data Deficient (IUCN 3.1)

Scientific classification
- Kingdom: Animalia
- Phylum: Chordata
- Class: Reptilia
- Order: Squamata
- Suborder: Serpentes
- Family: Colubridae
- Genus: Calamaria
- Species: C. abramovi

Binomial name
- Calamaria abramovi Orlov, 2009
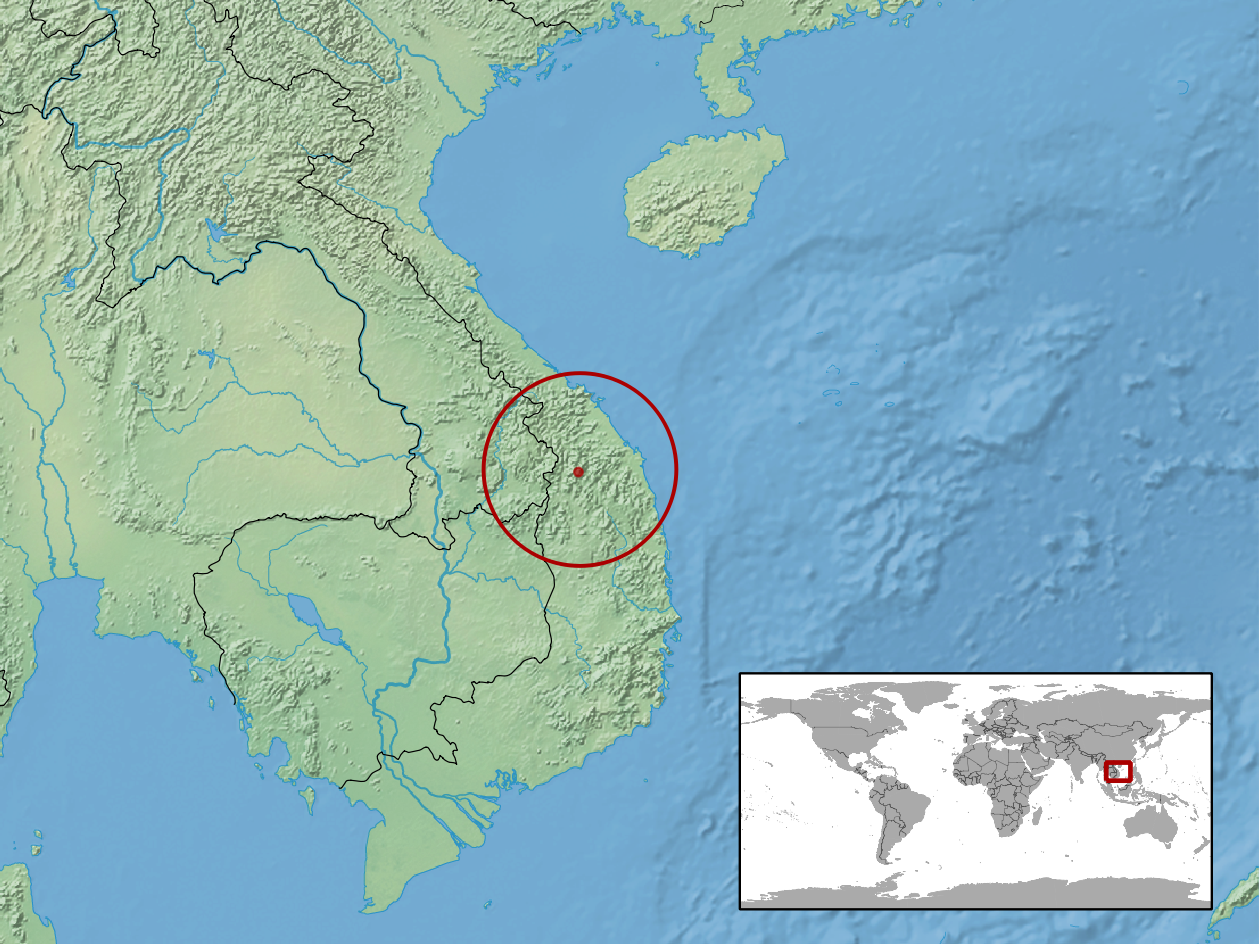

Species of snake

Calamaria abramovi is a species of snake in the subfamily Calamariinae of the family Colubridae. The species is endemic to Vietnam.

== Etymology ==
The specific name, abramovi, is in honor of Russian herpetologist Alexey V. Abramov.

== Geographic distribution ==
Calamaria abramovi is found in the Central Highlands of Vietnam, in Kon Tum province.

== Habitat ==
The preferred natural habitat of Calamaria abramovi is forest, at altitudes of 1,550–1,700 m (5,090–5,580 ft).

== Behavior ==
Calamaria abramovi is terrestrial, foraging and sheltering in the leaf litter of the forest.

== Reproduction ==
Calamaria abramovi is oviparous.
