= Calamaria buchi =

Conservation status
- Data Deficient (IUCN 3.1)

Scientific classification
- Kingdom: Animalia
- Phylum: Chordata
- Class: Reptilia
- Order: Squamata
- Suborder: Serpentes
- Family: Colubridae
- Genus: Calamaria
- Species: C. buchi

Binomial name
- Calamaria buchi Marx & Inger, 1955
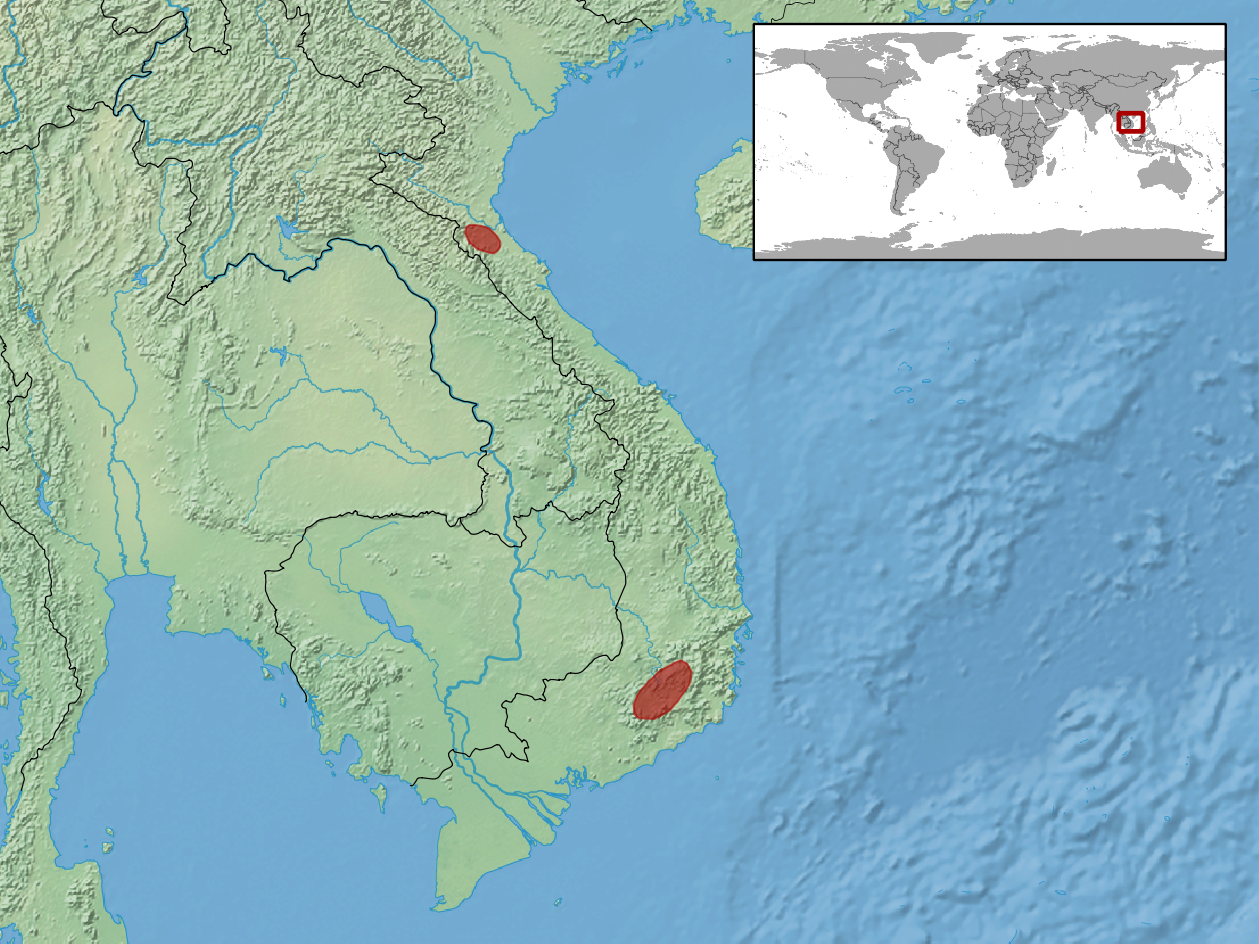

Species of snake

Calamaria buchi, also known commonly as Buch's reed snake and the Dalat dwarf snake, is a species of snake in the subfamily Calamariinae of the family Colubridae. The species is endemic to Vietnam.

== Etymology ==
The specific name, buchi, is in honor of French missionary Father Buch who collected the holotype.

== Description ==
The diameter of the eye of Calamaria buchi is equal to the distance from the eye to the mouth. The frontal is twice as wide as a supraocular. There is a preocular present. There are four upper labials, the second and third contacting the eye. The holotype, a female, has 221 ventrals.

== Geographic distribution ==
Calamaria buchi is found in Lam Dong Province and Ha Tinh Province, Vietnam.

== Habitat ==
The preferred natural habitat of Calamaria buchi is forest, at elevations from sea level to 500 m (1,600 ft).

== Behavior ==
Calamaria buchi is terrestrial, fossorial, and nocturnal.

== Reproduction ==
Calamaria buchi is oviparous.
