= Somali sharp-snouted worm lizard =

Scientific classification
- Kingdom: Animalia
- Phylum: Chordata
- Class: Reptilia
- Order: Squamata
- Clade: Amphisbaenia
- Family: Amphisbaenidae
- Genus: Ancylocranium
- Species: A. somalicum

Binomial name
- Ancylocranium somalicum (Scortecci, 1930)

Species of amphisbaenian found in Africa

The Somali sharp-snouted worm lizard (Ancylocranium somalicum) is a species of amphisbaenian in the family Amphisbaenidae. The species is found in Somalia and Ethiopia.
