= Calamaria lumholtzi =

Conservation status
- Data Deficient (IUCN 3.1)

Scientific classification
- Kingdom: Animalia
- Phylum: Chordata
- Class: Reptilia
- Order: Squamata
- Suborder: Serpentes
- Family: Colubridae
- Genus: Calamaria
- Species: C. lumholtzi

Binomial name
- Calamaria lumholtzi Andersson, 1923
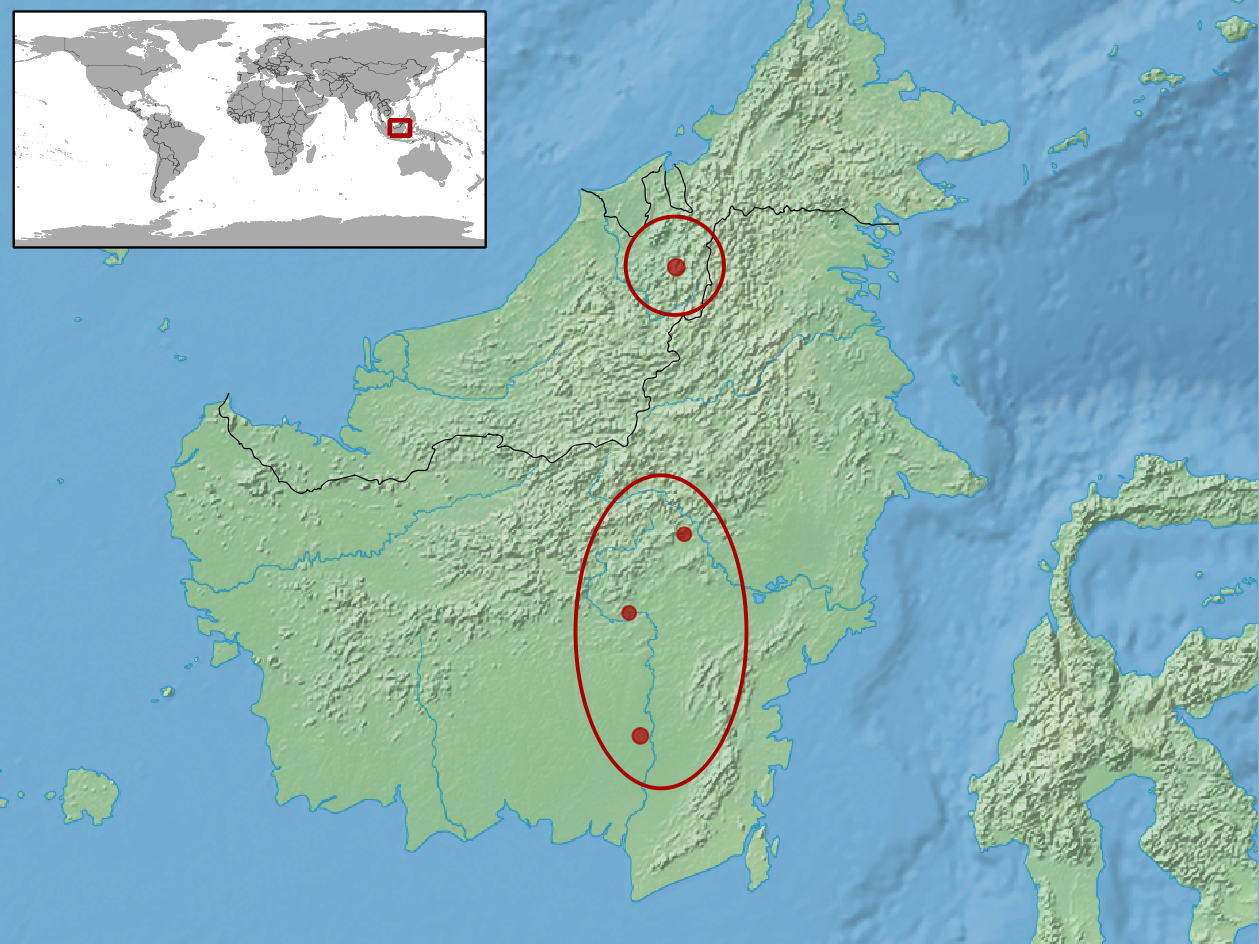

Synonyms
- Calamaria raveni Cochran, 1923

Species of snake

Calamaria lumholtzi, also known commonly as Lumholz's reed snake, is a species of snake in the subfamily Calamariinae of the family Colubridae. The species is native to Indonesia.

== Etymology ==
The specific name, lumholtzi, is in honor of Norwegian explorer Carl Sofus Lumholtz.

== Geographic range ==
Calamaria lumholtzi is found on the island of Borneo.

== Habitat ==
The preferred natural habitat of Calamaria lumholtzi is forest, at altitudes of about 1,000 m (3,300 ft).

== Behavior ==
Calamaria lumholtzi is terrestrial.

== Reproduction ==
Calamaria lumholtzi is oviparous.
