= Calamaria battersbyi =

Conservation status
- Data Deficient (IUCN 3.1)

Scientific classification
- Kingdom: Animalia
- Phylum: Chordata
- Class: Reptilia
- Order: Squamata
- Suborder: Serpentes
- Family: Colubridae
- Genus: Calamaria
- Species: C. battersbyi

Binomial name
- Calamaria battersbyi Inger & Marx, 1965
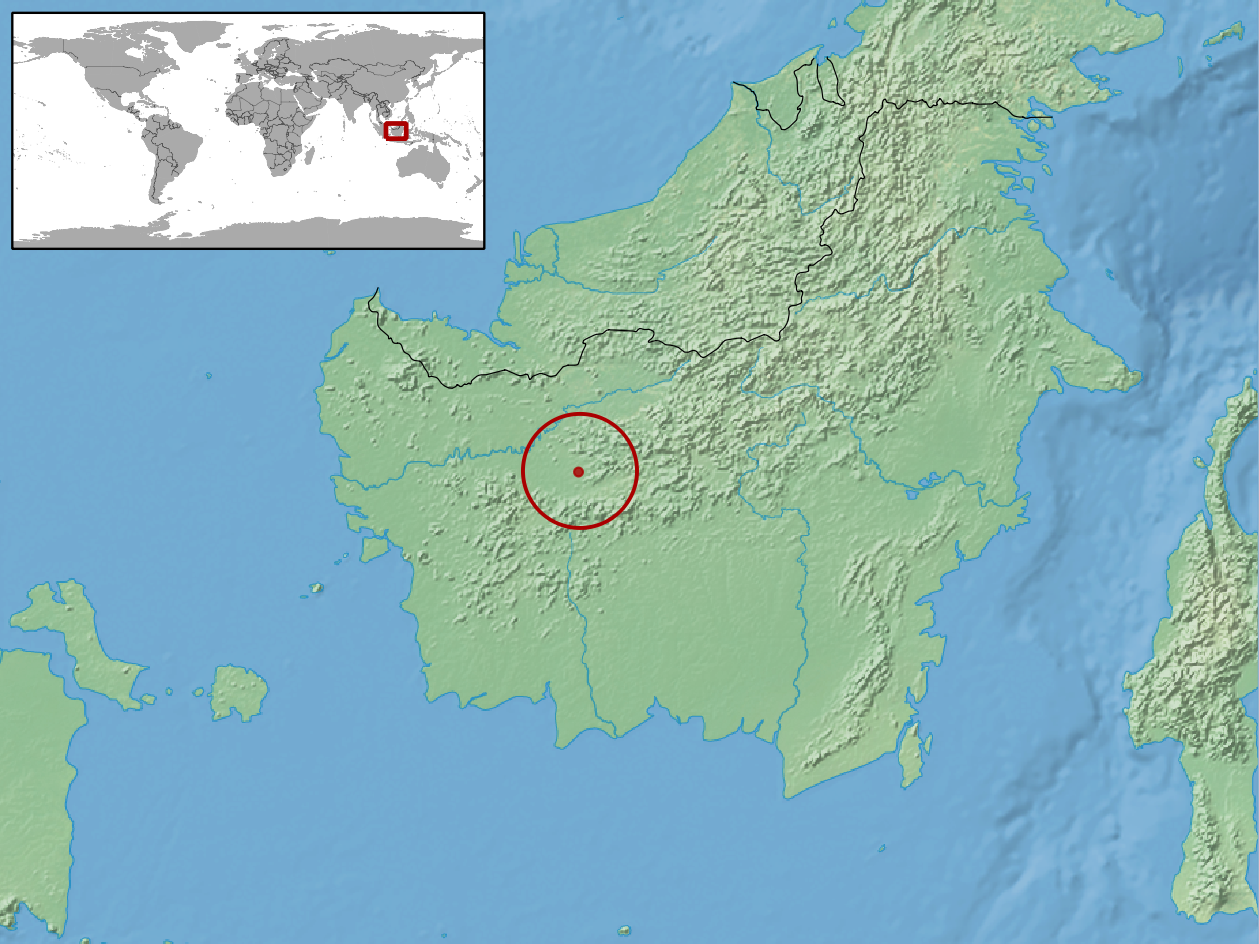

Species of snake

Calamaria battersbyi, also known commonly as Battersby's reed snake, is a species of snake in the subfamily Calamariinae of the family Colubridae. The species is endemic to Kalimantan, the Indonesian portion of the island of Borneo.

== Etymology ==
The specific name, battersbyi, is in honor of British herpetologist James Clarence Battersby.

== Description ==
Calamaria battersbyi exhibits the following diagnostic characters. The mental contacts the anterior chin shields. A preocular is present. Each ventral has a dark anterior half and a light posterior half.

== Behavior ==
Calamaria battersbyi is terrestrial.

== Reproduction ==
Calamaria battersbyi is oviparous.
