= Calamaria boesemani =

Conservation status
- Data Deficient (IUCN 3.1)

Scientific classification
- Kingdom: Animalia
- Phylum: Chordata
- Class: Reptilia
- Order: Squamata
- Suborder: Serpentes
- Family: Colubridae
- Genus: Calamaria
- Species: C. boesemani

Binomial name
- Calamaria boesemani Inger & Marx, 1965
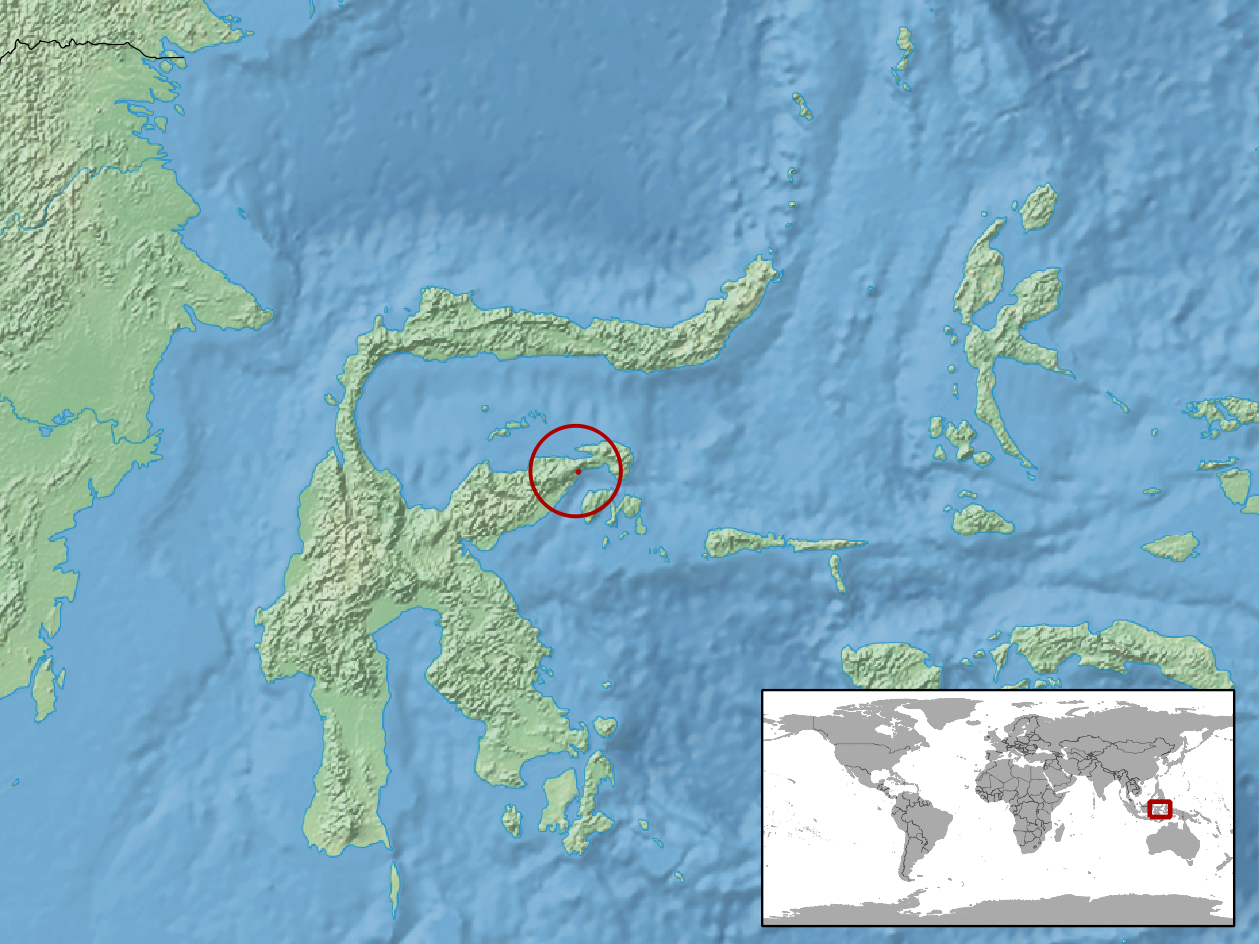

Species of snake

Calamaria boesemani, also known commonly as Boeseman's reed snake, is a species of snake in the subfamily Calamariinae of the family Colubridae. The species is endemic to Sulawesi in Indonesia.

== Etymology ==
The specific name, boesemani, is in honor of Dutch ichthyologist Marinus Boeseman.

== Description ==
The eye of Calamaria boesemani is large for the genus, almost 1.5 times the distance from the eye to the mouth. The mental is not in contact with the anterior chin shields.

== Habitat ==
The preferred natural habitat of Calamaria boesemani is forest.

== Behavior ==
Calamaria boesemani is terrestrial and semifossorial.

== Reproduction ==
Calamaria boesemani is oviparous.
