= Anolis sierramaestrae =

Conservation status
- Data Deficient (IUCN 3.1)

Scientific classification
- Kingdom: Animalia
- Phylum: Chordata
- Class: Reptilia
- Order: Squamata
- Suborder: Iguania
- Family: Dactyloidae
- Genus: Anolis
- Species: A. sierramaestrae

Binomial name
- Anolis sierramaestrae Holáňová, Rehák, & Frynta, 2012

Species of lizard

Anolis sierramaestrae, the Sierra Maestrae bearded anole, is a species of lizard in the family Dactyloidae. The species is found in Cuba.
