= Phelsuma borai =

Conservation status
- Data Deficient (IUCN 3.1)

Scientific classification
- Kingdom: Animalia
- Phylum: Chordata
- Class: Reptilia
- Order: Squamata
- Suborder: Gekkota
- Family: Gekkonidae
- Genus: Phelsuma
- Species: P. borai

Binomial name
- Phelsuma borai Glaw, J. Köhler & Vences, 2009
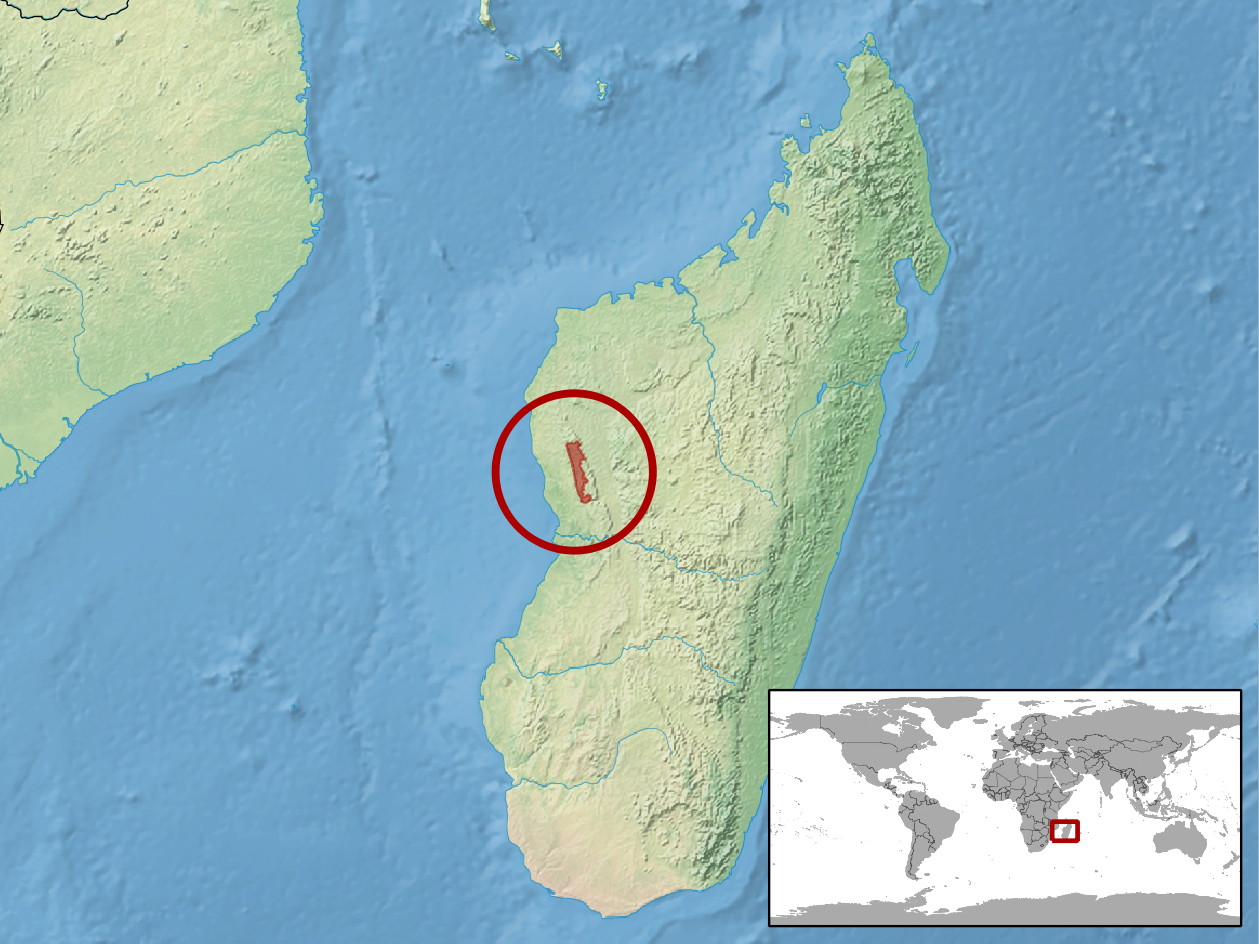

Species of lizard

Phelsuma borai is a species of gecko, a lizard in the family Gekkonidae. The species is endemic to Madagascar.

== Etymology ==
The specific name, borai, is in honor of Malagasy herpetologist Parfait Bora.

== Geographic range ==
P. borai is found in the Melaky region of western Madagascar.

== Habitat ==
The preferred natural habitat of P. borai is dry deciduous forest, at an altitude of 177 m (581 ft).

== Description ==
Dorsally, P. borai is grayish brown; ventrally it is whitish. Unlike most other species in its genus, it has no green or red coloration. The holotype has a snout-to-vent length (SVL) of 4.2 cm (1.7 in), and it has a tail length of 4.6 cm (1.8 in), which is slightly longer than its SVL.

== Reproduction ==
The mode of reproduction of P. borai is unknown.
