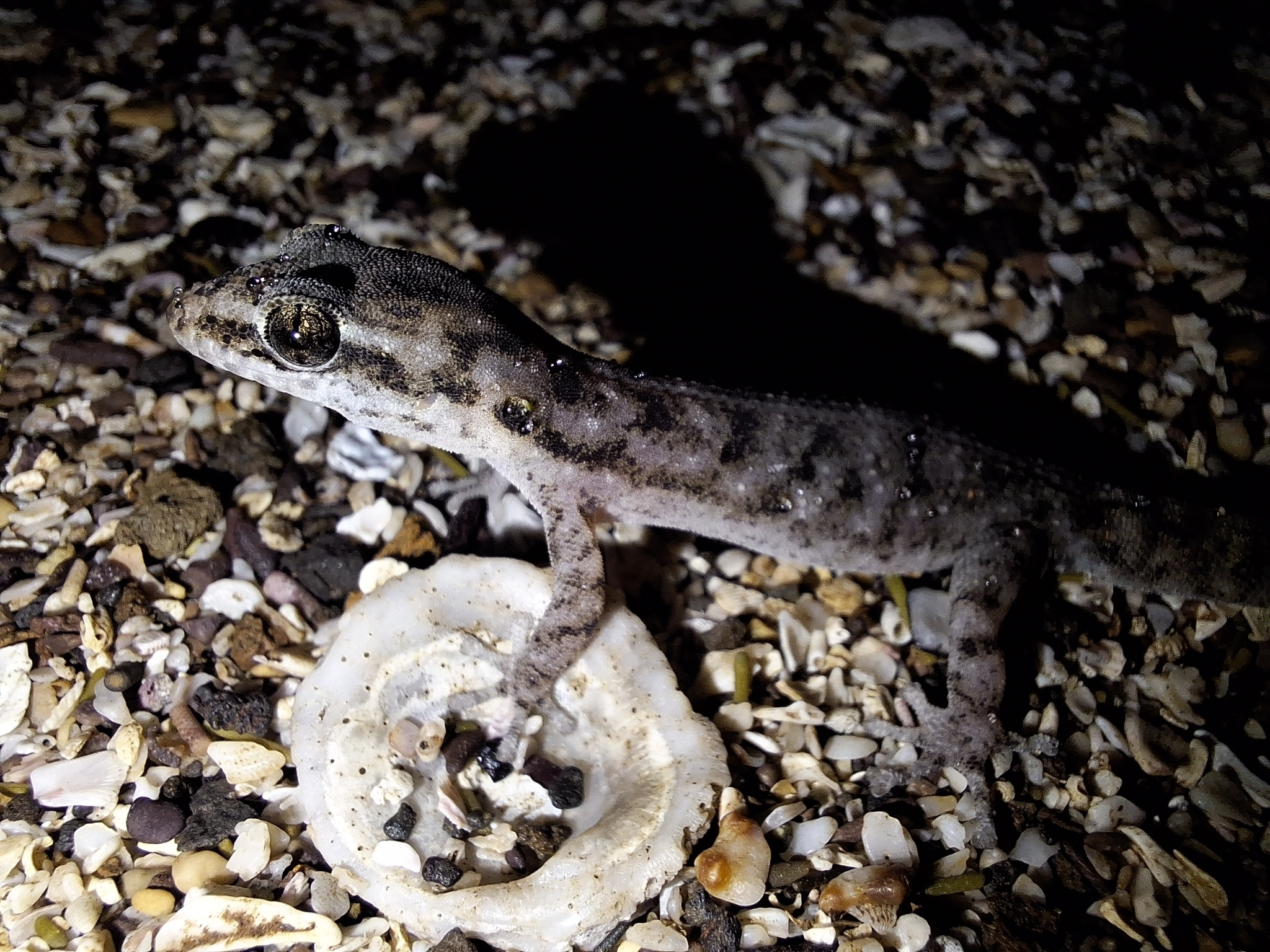

Conservation status
- Data Deficient (IUCN 3.1)

Scientific classification
- Kingdom: Animalia
- Phylum: Chordata
- Class: Reptilia
- Order: Squamata
- Suborder: Gekkota
- Family: Phyllodactylidae
- Genus: Phyllodactylus
- Species: P. baurii

Binomial name
- Phyllodactylus baurii Garman, 1892

= Baur's leaf-toed gecko =

Species of lizard

Baur's leaf-toed gecko (Phyllodactylus baurii) is a species of lizard in the family Phyllodactylidae. The species is endemic to the Galápagos Islands.

== Etymology ==
The specific name, baurii, is in honor of German herpetologist Georg Baur.

== Geographic range ==
P. baurii is found on Charles Island, including its islets Champion and Enderby, and on Hood Island.

== Habitat ==
The preferred natural habitat of P. baurii is shrubland.

== Description ==
P. baurii may attain a snout-to-vent length (SVL) of about 5 cm (2.0 in). Dorsally, it is brownish gray, with dark brown markings. Ventrally, it is yellowish white, with minute dark brown dots.

== Reproduction ==
P. baurii is oviparous. Average egg size is 10.5 mm × 7.5 mm (0.41 in × 0.30 in).
