= Liolaemus cinereus =

Conservation status
- Data Deficient (IUCN 3.1)

Scientific classification
- Kingdom: Animalia
- Phylum: Chordata
- Class: Reptilia
- Order: Squamata
- Suborder: Iguania
- Family: Liolaemidae
- Genus: Liolaemus
- Species: L. cinereus

Binomial name
- Liolaemus cinereus Monguillot, Cabrera, Acosta, & Villavicencio, 2006

Species of lizard

Liolaemus cinereus is a species of lizard in the family Liolaemidae. It is native to Argentina.
