= Hemidactylus barbierii =

Conservation status
- Data Deficient (IUCN 3.1)

Scientific classification
- Kingdom: Animalia
- Phylum: Chordata
- Class: Reptilia
- Order: Squamata
- Suborder: Gekkota
- Family: Gekkonidae
- Genus: Hemidactylus
- Species: H. barbierii

Binomial name
- Hemidactylus barbierii Sindaco, Razzetti & Ziliani, 2007

Species of lizard

Hemidactylus barbierii is a species of gecko, a lizard in the family Gekkonidae. The species is endemic to Kenya.

== Etymology ==
The specific name, barbierii, is in honor of Italian herpetologist Francesco Barbieri (1944–2001).

== Geographic range ==
H. barbierii is found in the area east of Lake Turkana, in northern Kenya.

== Habitat ==
The preferred natural habitat of H. barbierii is savanna.

== Description ==
H. barbierii is medium-sized for its genus. Males may attain a snout-to-vent length (SVL) of 4 cm (1.6 in). Females are somewhat larger, up to 5 cm (2.0 in) SVL.

== Reproduction ==
H. barbierii is oviparous.
