= Hemidactylus tanganicus =

Conservation status
- Data Deficient (IUCN 3.1)

Scientific classification
- Kingdom: Animalia
- Phylum: Chordata
- Class: Reptilia
- Order: Squamata
- Suborder: Gekkota
- Family: Gekkonidae
- Genus: Hemidactylus
- Species: H. tanganicus

Binomial name
- Hemidactylus tanganicus Loveridge, 1929

Species of lizard

Hemidactylus tanganicus, also known as the Tanzania leaf-toed gecko, Tanzanian diamond gecko or Dutumi gecko, is a species of gecko. It is endemic to Tanzania.
