= Liolaemus montanezi =

Conservation status
- Data Deficient (IUCN 3.1)

Scientific classification
- Kingdom: Animalia
- Phylum: Chordata
- Class: Reptilia
- Order: Squamata
- Suborder: Iguania
- Family: Liolaemidae
- Genus: Liolaemus
- Species: L. montanezi

Binomial name
- Liolaemus montanezi Cabrera & Monguillot, 2006

Species of lizard

Liolaemus montanezi is a species of lizard in the family Liolaemidae. The species is endemic to Argentina.

== Etymology ==
The specific name, montanezi, is in honor of Alvaro Montañez of Parque Nacional San Guillermo, Argentina.

== Geographic distribution ==
Liolaemus montanezi is found in western Argentina, in San Juan Province.

== Habitat ==
The preferred natural habitat of Liolaemus montanezi is shrubland, at elevations around 2,300 m (7,500 ft).

== Reproduction ==
The mode of reproduction of Liolaemus montanezi is unknown.
