= Hemidactylus albivertebralis =

Conservation status
- Data Deficient (IUCN 3.1)

Scientific classification
- Kingdom: Animalia
- Phylum: Chordata
- Class: Reptilia
- Order: Squamata
- Suborder: Gekkota
- Family: Gekkonidae
- Genus: Hemidactylus
- Species: H. albivertebralis

Binomial name
- Hemidactylus albivertebralis Trape & Böhme, 2012

Species of lizard

Hemidactylus albivertebralis is a species of gecko. It is endemic to West Africa and currently recorded from Guinea, Ivory Coast, Ghana, and Benin. It probably occurs more widely.
