= Hemidactylus lopezjuradoi =

Conservation status
- Data Deficient (IUCN 3.1)

Scientific classification
- Kingdom: Animalia
- Phylum: Chordata
- Class: Reptilia
- Order: Squamata
- Suborder: Gekkota
- Family: Gekkonidae
- Genus: Hemidactylus
- Species: H. lopezjuradoi

Binomial name
- Hemidactylus lopezjuradoi Arnold, Vasconcelos, Harris, Mateo, Carranza, 2008

Species of lizard

Hemidactylus lopezjuradoi is a species of gecko, a lizard in the family Gekkonidae. The species is endemic to the Cape Verde Islands.

== Geographic range ==
In the Cape Verde Islands H. lopezjuradoi has only been found on the island of Fogo.

== Etymology ==
The specific name, lopezjuradoi, is in honor of Spanish herpetologist Luis Felipe López-Jurado.

== Description ==
Adult H. lopezjuradoi may attain a snout-to-vent length (SVL) of 4 cm (1.6 in).

== Reproduction ==
H. lopezjuradoi is oviparous.
