= Hemidactylus porbandarensis =

Conservation status
- Data Deficient (IUCN 3.1)

Scientific classification
- Kingdom: Animalia
- Phylum: Chordata
- Class: Reptilia
- Order: Squamata
- Suborder: Gekkota
- Family: Gekkonidae
- Genus: Hemidactylus
- Species: H. porbandarensis

Binomial name
- Hemidactylus porbandarensis Sharma, 1981

Species of lizard

Hemidactylus porbandarensis is a species of geckos found in Gujarat, India. It is usually considered conspecific with Heyden's gecko.
