= Scheffler's dwarf gecko =

Conservation status
- Data Deficient (IUCN 3.1)

Scientific classification
- Kingdom: Animalia
- Phylum: Chordata
- Class: Reptilia
- Order: Squamata
- Suborder: Gekkota
- Family: Gekkonidae
- Genus: Lygodactylus
- Species: L. scheffleri

Binomial name
- Lygodactylus scheffleri Sternfeld, 1912

Synonyms
- Lygodactylus fischeri Var. scheffleri Sternfeld, 1912; Lygodactylus fischeri scheffleri — Loveridge, 1920; Lygodactylus scheffleri — Kluge, 1993

Species of lizard

Scheffler's dwarf gecko (Lygodactylus scheffleri) is a species of lizard in the family Gekkonidae. The species is native to East Africa. There are three recognized subspecies.

== Etymology ==
The specific name, scheffleri, is in honor of Georg Scheffler, who was a German collector of natural history specimens, and who collected the holotype.

== Geographic range ==
L. scheffleri is found in Kenya and Tanzania.

== Habitat ==
The preferred natural habitats of L. scheffleri are forest and savanna.

== Reproduction ==
L. scheffleri is oviparous.

== Subspecies ==
The following three subspecies, including the nominotypical subspecies, are recognized as being valid.

- Lygodactylus scheffleri compositus G. Pasteur, 1964
- Lygodactylus scheffleri scheffleri Sternfeld, 1912
- Lygodactylus scheffleri ulugurensis G. Pasteur, 1964
