= Sceloporus subpictus =

Conservation status
- Data Deficient (IUCN 3.1)

Scientific classification
- Kingdom: Animalia
- Phylum: Chordata
- Class: Reptilia
- Order: Squamata
- Suborder: Iguania
- Family: Phrynosomatidae
- Genus: Sceloporus
- Species: S. subpictus

Binomial name
- Sceloporus subpictus J.D. Lynch & H.M. Smith, 1965

Species of lizard

Sceloporus subpictus, the southern cursorial lizard or paintbelly spiny lizard, is a species of lizard in the family Phrynosomatidae. It is endemic to Mexico.
