= Anolis cristifer =

Conservation status
- Data Deficient (IUCN 3.1)

Scientific classification
- Kingdom: Animalia
- Phylum: Chordata
- Class: Reptilia
- Order: Squamata
- Suborder: Iguania
- Family: Dactyloidae
- Genus: Anolis
- Species: A. cristifer

Binomial name
- Anolis cristifer Smith, 1968

Species of lizard

Anolis cristifer, the crested lichen anole or Cristifer anole, is a species of lizard in the family Dactyloidae. The species is found in Mexico and Guatemala.
