= Anolis poei =

Conservation status
- Data Deficient (IUCN 3.1)

Scientific classification
- Kingdom: Animalia
- Phylum: Chordata
- Class: Reptilia
- Order: Squamata
- Suborder: Iguania
- Family: Dactyloidae
- Genus: Anolis
- Species: A. poei

Binomial name
- Anolis poei Ayala-Varela, Troya-Rodríguez, Talero-Rodríguez, & Torres-Carvajal, 2014

Species of lizard

Anolis poei, the Telimbela anole, is a species of lizard in the family Dactyloidae. The species is found in Ecuador.
