= Anolis duellmani =

Conservation status
- Data Deficient (IUCN 3.1)

Scientific classification
- Kingdom: Animalia
- Phylum: Chordata
- Class: Reptilia
- Order: Squamata
- Suborder: Iguania
- Family: Dactyloidae
- Genus: Anolis
- Species: A. duellmani

Binomial name
- Anolis duellmani Fitch & Henderson, 1973

Synonyms
- Norops duellmani (Fitch & Henderson, 1973)

Species of lizard

Anolis duellmani, also known commonly as Duellman's anole, Duellman's pygmy anole, and el abanaquillo de Duellman in Mexican Spanish, is a species of lizard in the family Dactyloidae. The species is endemic to Mexico.

== Etymology ==
The specific name, duellmani, is in honor of American herpetologist William Edward Duellman.

== Geographic range ==
A. duellmani is found in the Mexican state of Veracruz.

== Habitat ==
The preferred natural habitat of A. duellmani is forest.

== Description ==
A. duellmani is very small for its genus. Adult males have a snout-to-vent length (SVL) of about 3.5 cm (1.4 in). The tail is about one and two thirds SVL.

== Reproduction ==
A. duellmani is oviparous.

== Taxonomy ==
A. duellmani belongs to the Anolis auratus species group.
