= Kilwa sharp-snouted worm lizard =

Conservation status
- Data Deficient (IUCN 3.1)

Scientific classification
- Kingdom: Animalia
- Phylum: Chordata
- Class: Reptilia
- Order: Squamata
- Clade: Amphisbaenia
- Family: Amphisbaenidae
- Genus: Ancylocranium
- Species: A. ionidesi

Binomial name
- Ancylocranium ionidesi Loveridge, 1955

Species of amphisbaenian

The Kilwa sharp-snouted worm lizard (Ancylocranium ionidesi) is a species of amphisbaenian in the family Amphisbaenidae. The species is endemic to Tanzania. There are two recognized subspecies.

== Etymology ==
The specific name, ionidesi, is in honor of British game warden Constantine John Philip Ionides (1901–1968), who was known as the "Snake Man of British East Africa".

== Geographic range ==
A. ionidesi is found in southeastern Tanzania.

== Habitat ==
The preferred natural habitat of A. ionidesi is forest, at altitudes around 500 m (1,600 ft).

== Behavior ==
A. ionidesi is terrestrial and fossorial.

== Diet ==
A. ionidesi preys upon small invertebrates such as termites.

== Reproduction ==
A. ionidesi is oviparous. Clutch size is one egg.

== Subspecies ==
There are two subspecies that are recognized as being valid, including the nominotypical subspecies.

- Ancylocranium ionidesi haasi Gans & Kochva, 1966
- Ancylocranium ionidesi ionidesi Loveridge, 1955
