= Cyrtodactylus aaroni =

Conservation status
- Data Deficient (IUCN 3.1)

Scientific classification
- Kingdom: Animalia
- Phylum: Chordata
- Class: Reptilia
- Order: Squamata
- Suborder: Gekkota
- Family: Gekkonidae
- Genus: Cyrtodactylus
- Species: C. aaroni

Binomial name
- Cyrtodactylus aaroni R. Günther & Rösler, 2002

Species of lizard

Cyrtodactylus aaroni is a species of gecko, a lizard in the family Gekkonidae. The species is endemic to western New Guinea, Indonesia.

== Etymology ==
The specific name, aaroni, is in honor of American herpetologist Aaron M. Bauer.

== Habitat ==
The preferred natural habitat of C. aaroni is forest, at altitudes of 500–700 m (1,600–2,300 ft).

== Reproduction ==
C. aaroni is oviparous.
