= Lindi sharp-snouted worm lizard =

Conservation status
- Data Deficient (IUCN 3.1)

Scientific classification
- Kingdom: Animalia
- Phylum: Chordata
- Class: Reptilia
- Order: Squamata
- Clade: Amphisbaenia
- Family: Amphisbaenidae
- Genus: Ancylocranium
- Species: A. barkeri

Binomial name
- Ancylocranium barkeri Loveridge, 1946

Species of amphisbaenian

The Lindi sharp-snouted worm lizard (Ancylocranium barkeri), also known commonly as Barker's sharp-snouted worm lizard, is a species of amphisbaenian in the family Amphisbaenidae. The species is endemic to Tanzania. There are two recognized subspecies.

== Etymology ==
The specific name, barkeri is in honor of New Zealander zoologist Ronald de la Bere Barker (1889–?).

== Habitat ==
The preferred natural habitat of A. barkeri is sandy areas, at altitudes of 800–1,000 m (2,600–3,300 ft).

== Diet ==
A. barkeri preys upon termites and other small invertebrates.

== Reproduction ==
A. barkeri is oviparous. Clutch size is a single egg.

== Subspecies ==
Two subspecies are recognized as being valid, including the nominotypical subspecies.

- Ancylocranium barkeri barkeri Loveridge, 1946
- Ancylocranium barkeri newalae Loveridge, 1962
