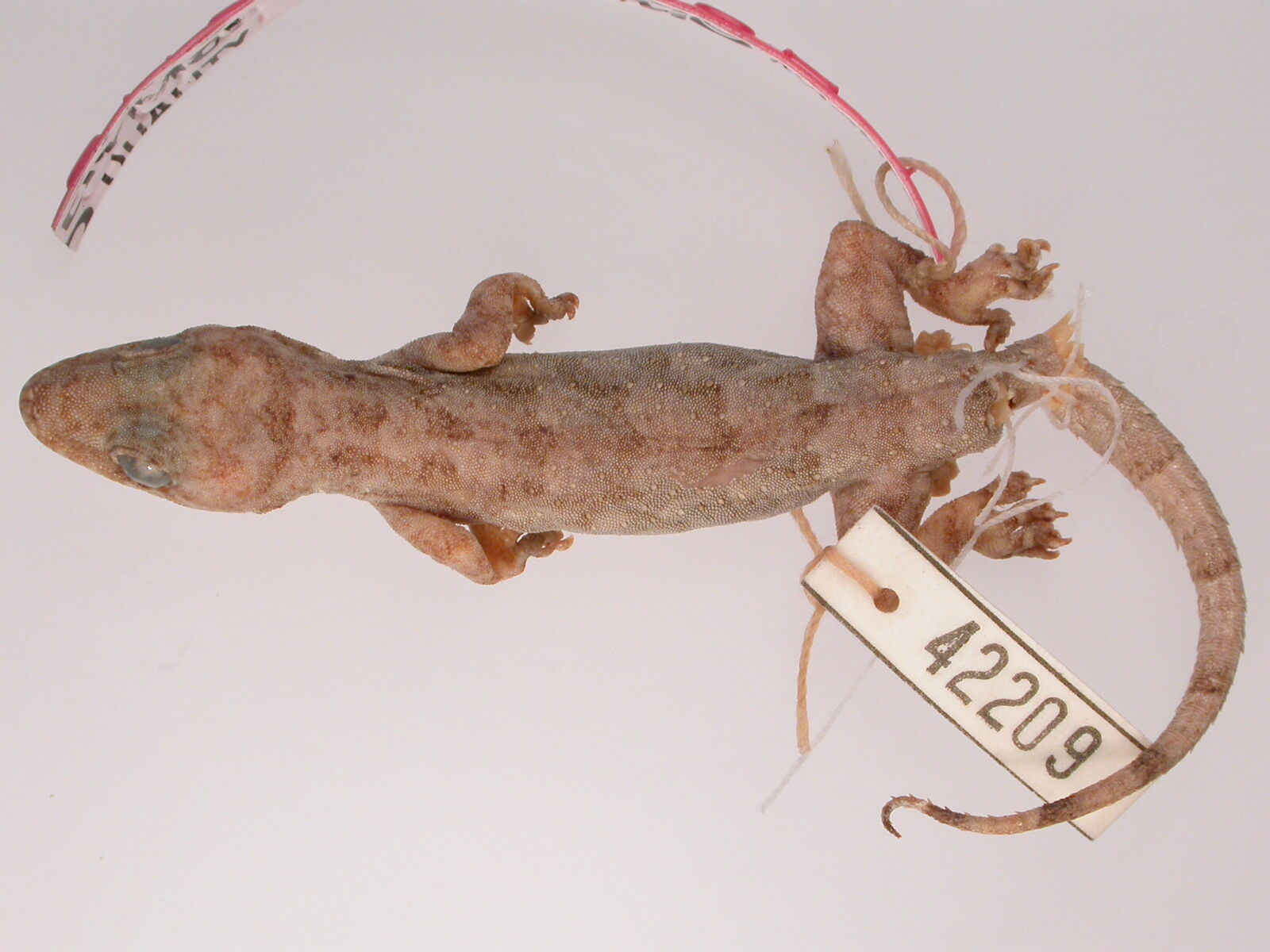

Conservation status
- Data Deficient (IUCN 3.1)

Scientific classification
- Kingdom: Animalia
- Phylum: Chordata
- Class: Reptilia
- Order: Squamata
- Suborder: Gekkota
- Family: Gekkonidae
- Genus: Hemidactylus
- Species: H. pseudomuriceus

Binomial name
- Hemidactylus pseudomuriceus Henle & Böhme, 2003

= Hemidactylus pseudomuriceus =

Species of lizard

Hemidactylus pseudomuriceus is a species of gecko. It is found in West Africa (Ivory Coast) and Central Africa (Cameroon, Central African Republic, and Republic of the Congo).

Its reproduction is oviparous and it presents the following characteristics: a distinctly enlarged central row of hexagonal scales on the ventral surface of the tail, thub normal with claw, 14-17 preanal pores in males and scansors on the ventral surface of the first and fourth toe low.
