= Hemidactylus subtriedrus =

Conservation status
- Data Deficient (IUCN 3.1)

Scientific classification
- Kingdom: Animalia
- Phylum: Chordata
- Class: Reptilia
- Order: Squamata
- Suborder: Gekkota
- Family: Gekkonidae
- Genus: Hemidactylus
- Species: H. subtriedrus

Binomial name
- Hemidactylus subtriedrus Jerdon, 1854

Species of lizard

Hemidactylus subtriedrus, also known as Jerdon's gecko or Madras blotched gecko, is a species of gecko found in India and Sri Lanka.

== Description ==
Head large, oviform; snout longer than the distance between the eye and the ear-opening, l.4 the diameter of the orbit; forehead concave; ear-opening large, suboval, oblique, measuring about half the diameter of the eye. Body and limbs moderate. Digits free, moderately dilated, inner well developed; infra-digital lamellae slightly oblique, 6 or 7 under the inner digits, 8 to 10 under the median digits. Snout covered with convex granules, which may be keeled; hinder part of head with minute granules intermixed with roundish tubercles, Rostral subquadrangular, not twice as broad as deep, with median cleft above; nostril pierced between the rostral, the first labial, and three or four nasals; 8 to 10 upper and 7 or 8 lower labials; mental large, triangular or pentagonal, at least twice as long as the adjacent labials; four chin-shields, median pair largest and in contact behind the mental. Upper surface of body covered with small flat granular scales, and large trihedral tubercles arranged in 16 to 20 more or less irregular longitudinal series; these tubercles vary somewhat in size according to specimens, but the largest never exceed two fifths the diameter of the eye. Abdominal scales large, smooth, rounded, imbricate. Moles with a series of preanal pores, interrupted medially; 6 to 8 pores on each side Tail rounded, feebly depressed, tapering, covered above with irregular, small, smooth imbricated scales and rings of large, pointed, keeled tubercles, beneath with a median series of transversely dilated plates. Light pinkish brown above, generally with more or less defined transverse darker bands bordered by pure white tubercles surrounded by deep-brown rings; young very regularly barred with dark brown, there being four dark bars between head and hind limbs; a more or less defined dark-brown streak, white-edged above, on the side of the head, passing through the eye; lower surfaces white-From snout to vent 3.7 inches; tail 3.8.

== Taxonomy ==
It was described as a distinct species by Jerdon in 1853 based on specimens collected from Nellore, Andhra Pradesh. Most subsequent authors called the validity of the species in question regarding it as a probable or definite synonym of Hemidactylus triedrus. Uncertainty as to the diagnostic features and geographic extent of H. subtriedrus relative to H. triedrus require a thorough taxonomic revision of both the species.

== Distribution ==
India, Central and southern India. Sri Lanka. Type locality: Nellore District, India.
