= Hemidactylus lamaensis =

Conservation status
- Data Deficient (IUCN 3.1)

Scientific classification
- Kingdom: Animalia
- Phylum: Chordata
- Class: Reptilia
- Order: Squamata
- Suborder: Gekkota
- Family: Gekkonidae
- Genus: Hemidactylus
- Species: H. lamaensis

Binomial name
- Hemidactylus lamaensis Ullenbruch, Grell, & Böhme, 2010

Species of lizard

Hemidactylus lamaensis is a species of gecko. It is endemic to Benin.
