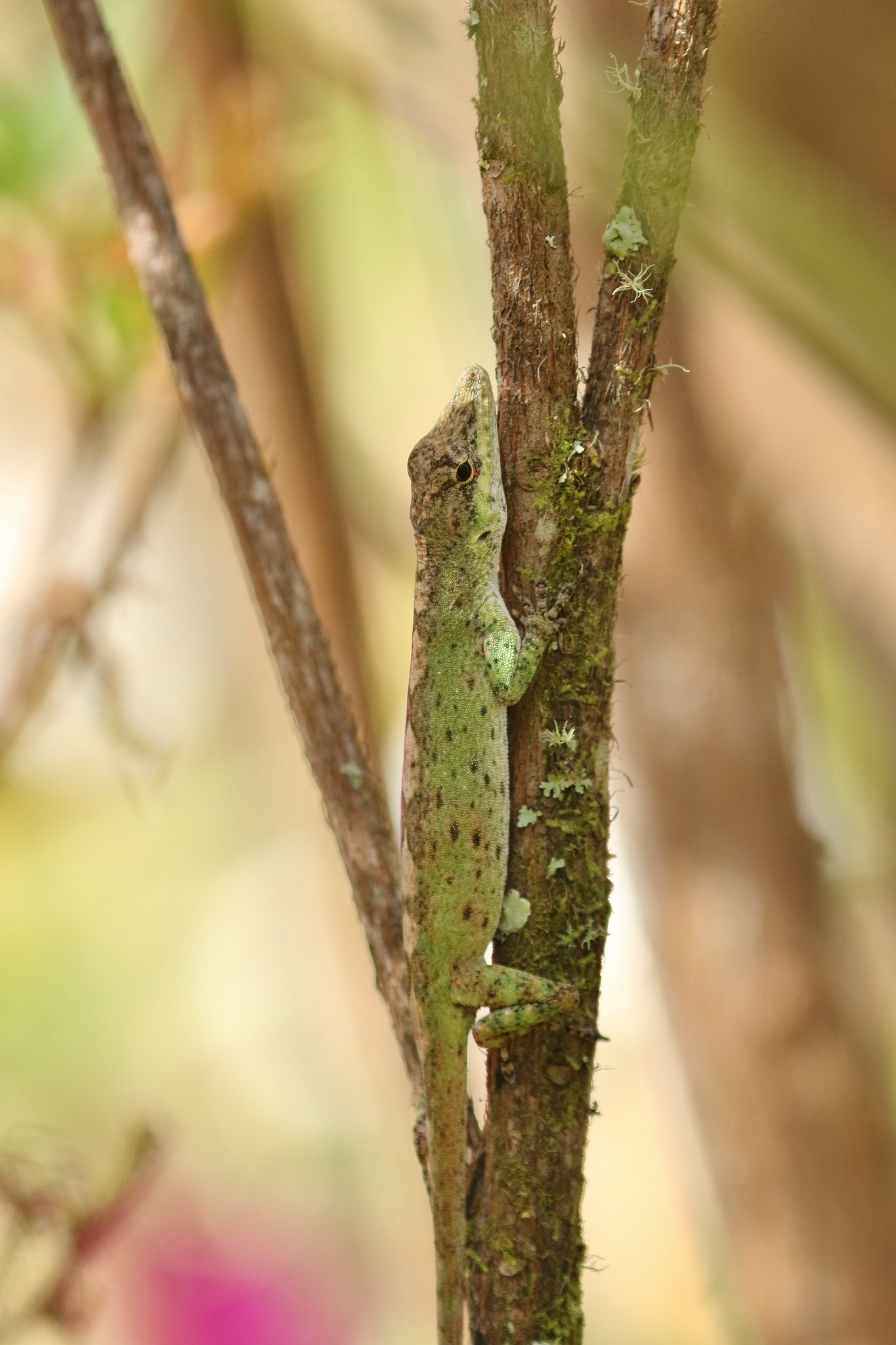

Conservation status
- Near Threatened (IUCN 3.1)

Scientific classification
- Kingdom: Animalia
- Phylum: Chordata
- Class: Reptilia
- Order: Squamata
- Suborder: Iguania
- Family: Dactyloidae
- Genus: Anolis
- Species: A. solitarius

Binomial name
- Anolis solitarius Ruthven, 1916

= Anolis solitarius =

Species of lizard

Anolis solitarius, the solitaire anole, is a species of lizard in the family Dactyloidae. The species is found in Colombia.
