= Hemidactylus lemurinus =

Scientific classification
- Kingdom: Animalia
- Phylum: Chordata
- Class: Reptilia
- Order: Squamata
- Suborder: Gekkota
- Family: Gekkonidae
- Genus: Hemidactylus
- Species: H. lemurinus

Binomial name
- Hemidactylus lemurinus Arnold, 1980
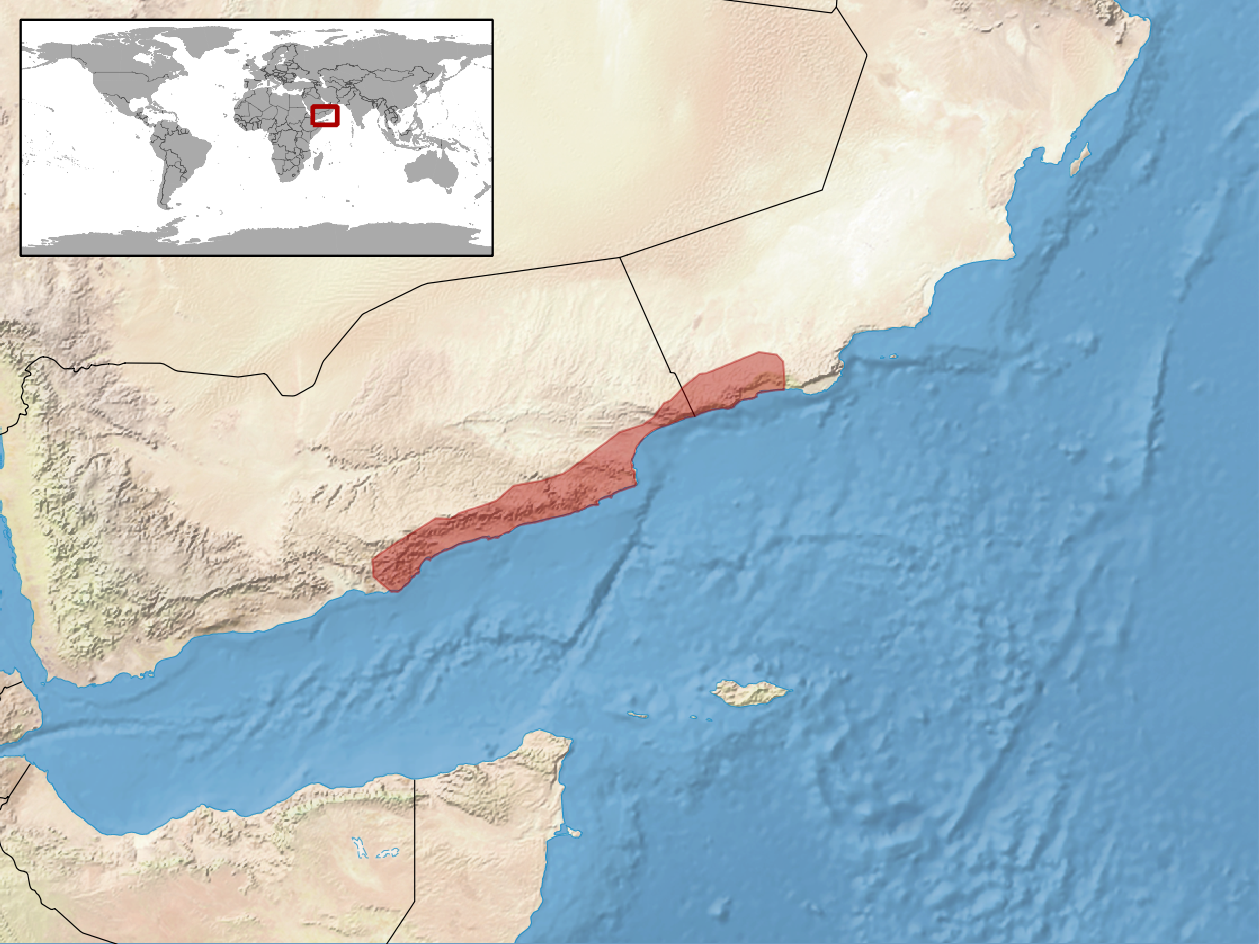

Species of lizard

Hemidactylus lemurinus, also known as the Dhofar leaf-toed gecko or Oman ghost leaf-toed gecko, is a species of gecko. It is native to southern Oman and southeastern Yemen.
