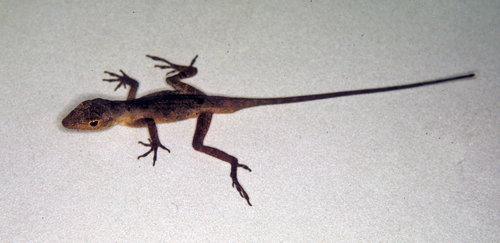

Conservation status
- Data Deficient (IUCN 3.1)

Scientific classification
- Kingdom: Animalia
- Phylum: Chordata
- Class: Reptilia
- Order: Squamata
- Suborder: Iguania
- Family: Dactyloidae
- Genus: Anolis
- Species: A. milleri

Binomial name
- Anolis milleri H.M. Smith, 1950

Synonyms
- Norops milleri H.M. Smith, 1950

= Anolis milleri =

Species of lizard

Anolis milleri, also known commonly as Miller's anole and el abaniquillo de Miller in Mexican Spanish, is a species of lizard in the family Dactyloidae. The species is native to southern Mexico.

== Etymology ==
The specific name, milleri, is in honor of ethnologist Walter S. Miller, who collected herpetological specimens in Mexico.

== Geographic distribution ==
Anolis milleri is endemic to the Mexican state of Oaxaca.

== Habitat ==
The preferred natural habitat of Anolis milleri is forest.

== Reproduction ==
Anolis milleri is oviparous.

== Taxonomy ==
Anolis milleri is a member of the Anolis auratus species group.
