= Cnemaspis jacobsoni =

Conservation status
- Data Deficient (IUCN 3.1)

Scientific classification
- Kingdom: Animalia
- Phylum: Chordata
- Class: Reptilia
- Order: Squamata
- Suborder: Gekkota
- Family: Gekkonidae
- Genus: Cnemaspis
- Species: C. jacobsoni

Binomial name
- Cnemaspis jacobsoni Das, 2005
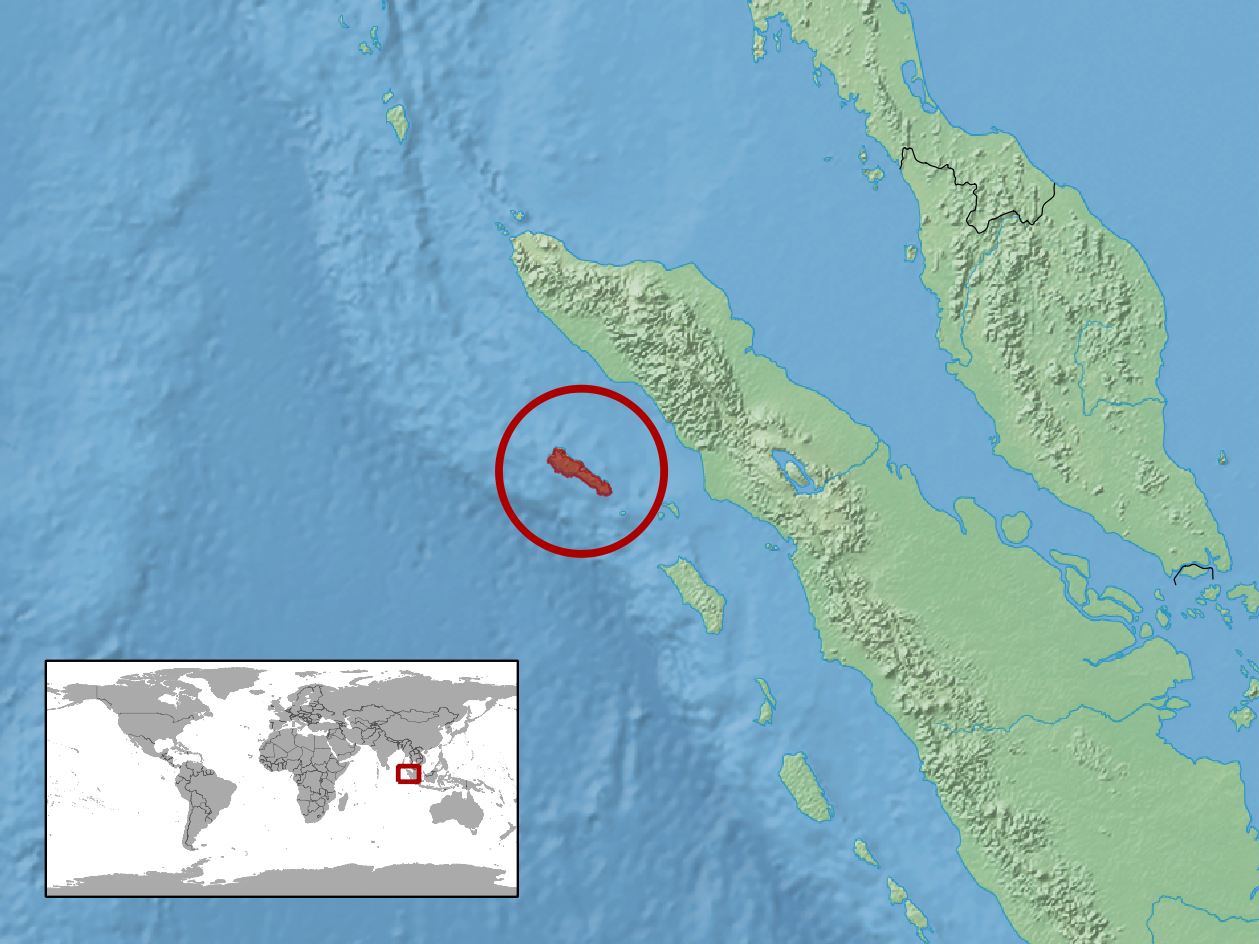

Species of lizard

Cnemaspis jacobsoni is a species of gecko, a lizard in the family Gekkonidae. The species is native to Indonesia.

== Etymology ==
The specific name, jacobsoni, is in honor of Dutch naturalist Edward Richard Jacobson (1870–1944).

== Geographic range ==
C. jacobsoni is endemic to the island of Simeulue, Indonesia.

== Habitat ==
The preferred natural habitat of C. jacobsoni is forest.

== Description ==
Small for its genus, C. jacobsoni may attain a snout-to-vent length (SVL) of 3 cm (1.2 in). Males have neither femoral pores nor preanal pores.

== Reproduction ==
C. jacobsoni is oviparous.
