= Cnemaspis australis =

Conservation status
- Data Deficient (IUCN 3.1)

Scientific classification
- Kingdom: Animalia
- Phylum: Chordata
- Class: Reptilia
- Order: Squamata
- Suborder: Gekkota
- Family: Gekkonidae
- Genus: Cnemaspis
- Species: C. australis

Binomial name
- Cnemaspis australis Manamendra-Arachchi, Batuwita & Pethiyagoda, 2007

Species of lizard

Cnemaspis australis, also known as the Southern Travancore day gecko, is a species of gecko endemic to Agasthyamalai Hills of the Southern Western Ghats, in the states of Tamil Nadu and Kerala in South India. It lives in rock boulders and is an evergreen forest dwelling diurnal, insectivorous and oviparous species. This species was previously confused with another gecko Mysore day gecko till a study in 2007 proved it to be a new species.
