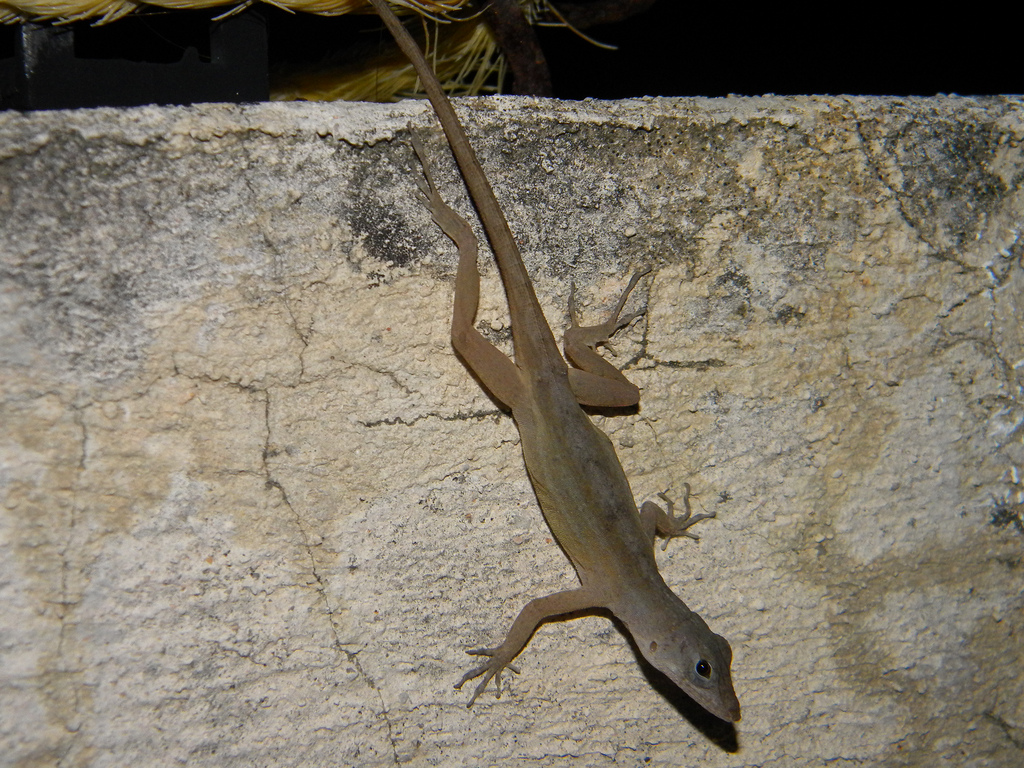

Conservation status
- Least Concern (IUCN 3.1)

Scientific classification
- Kingdom: Animalia
- Phylum: Chordata
- Class: Reptilia
- Order: Squamata
- Suborder: Iguania
- Family: Dactyloidae
- Genus: Anolis
- Species: A. rodriguezii

Binomial name
- Anolis rodriguezii Bocourt, 1873

= Anolis rodriguezii =

Species of lizard

Anolis rodriguezii, the Middle American smooth anole or Rodriguez's anole, is a species of lizard in the family Dactyloidae. The species is found in Mexico, Guatemala, Honduras, and Belize.
