= Etheridgeum =

Conservation status
- Data Deficient (IUCN 3.1)

Scientific classification
- Kingdom: Animalia
- Phylum: Chordata
- Class: Reptilia
- Order: Squamata
- Suborder: Serpentes
- Family: Colubridae
- Genus: Etheridgeum; Wallach, 1988
- Species: E. pulchrum

Binomial name
- Etheridgeum pulchrum (F. Werner, 1924)
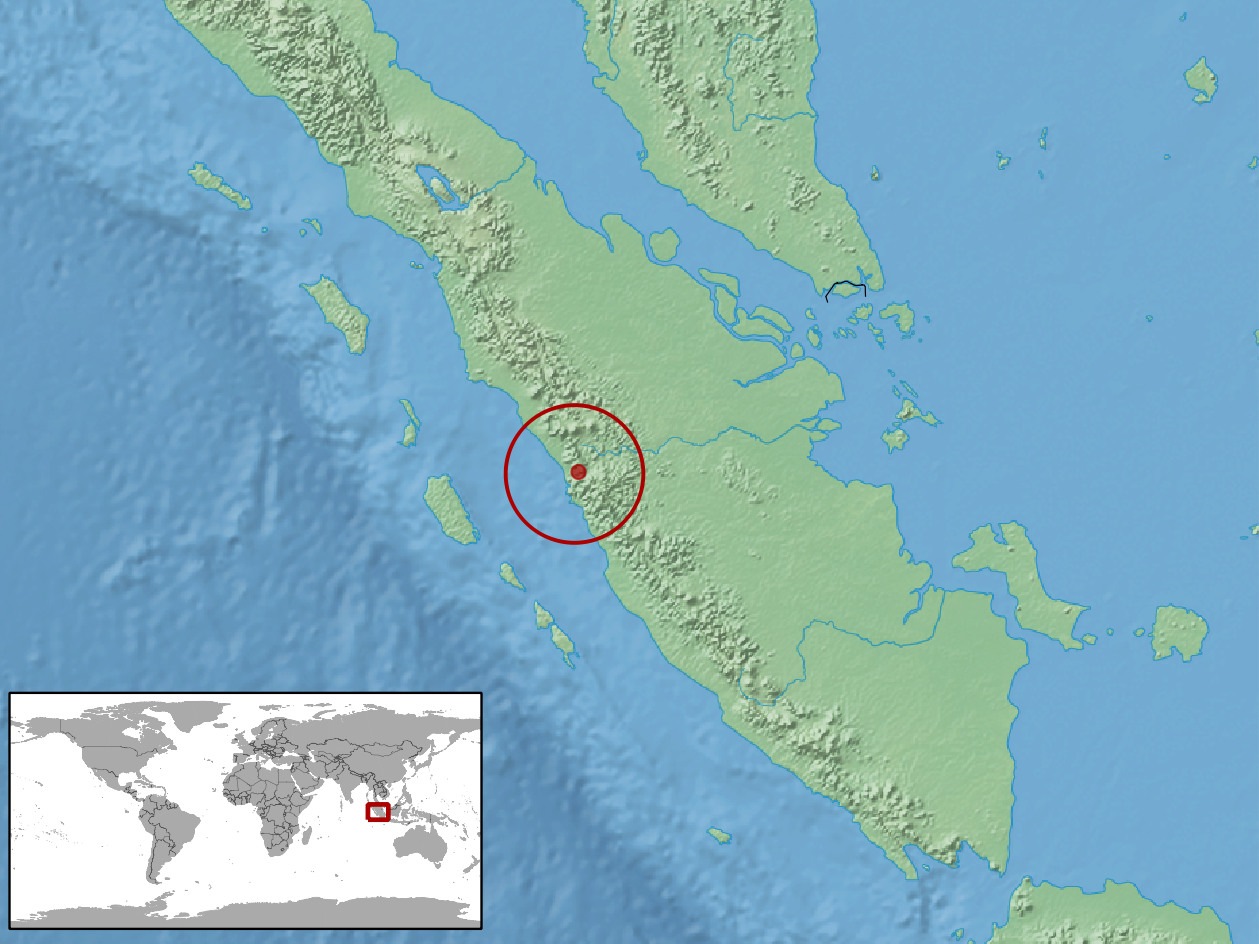

Synonyms
- Padangia pulchra F. Werner, 1924; Etheridgeum pulchrum — Wallach, 1988 (nomen substitutum)

Genus of snakes

Etheridgeum is a genus of snake in the family Colubridae. The genus is monotypic, containing the sole species Etheridgeum pulchrum, which is commonly known as the Sumatra Etheridge snake, and is native to Indonesia.

== Etymology ==
The generic name, Etheridgeum, is in honor of American herpetologist Richard Emmett Etheridge (1929–2019). The specific name, pulchrum, is Latin for "beautiful".

== Geographic range ==
E. pulchrum is endemic to Sumatra, Indonesia.

== Habitat ==
The preferred natural habitat of E. pulchrum is forest.

== Description ==
A small snake, the holotype of E. pulchrum has a snout-to-vent length of 14.5 cm (5.7 in). The dorsal scales are smooth, and they are arranged in 15 rows throughout the length of the body.

== Behavior ==
E. pulchrum is terrestrial and semifossorial.
