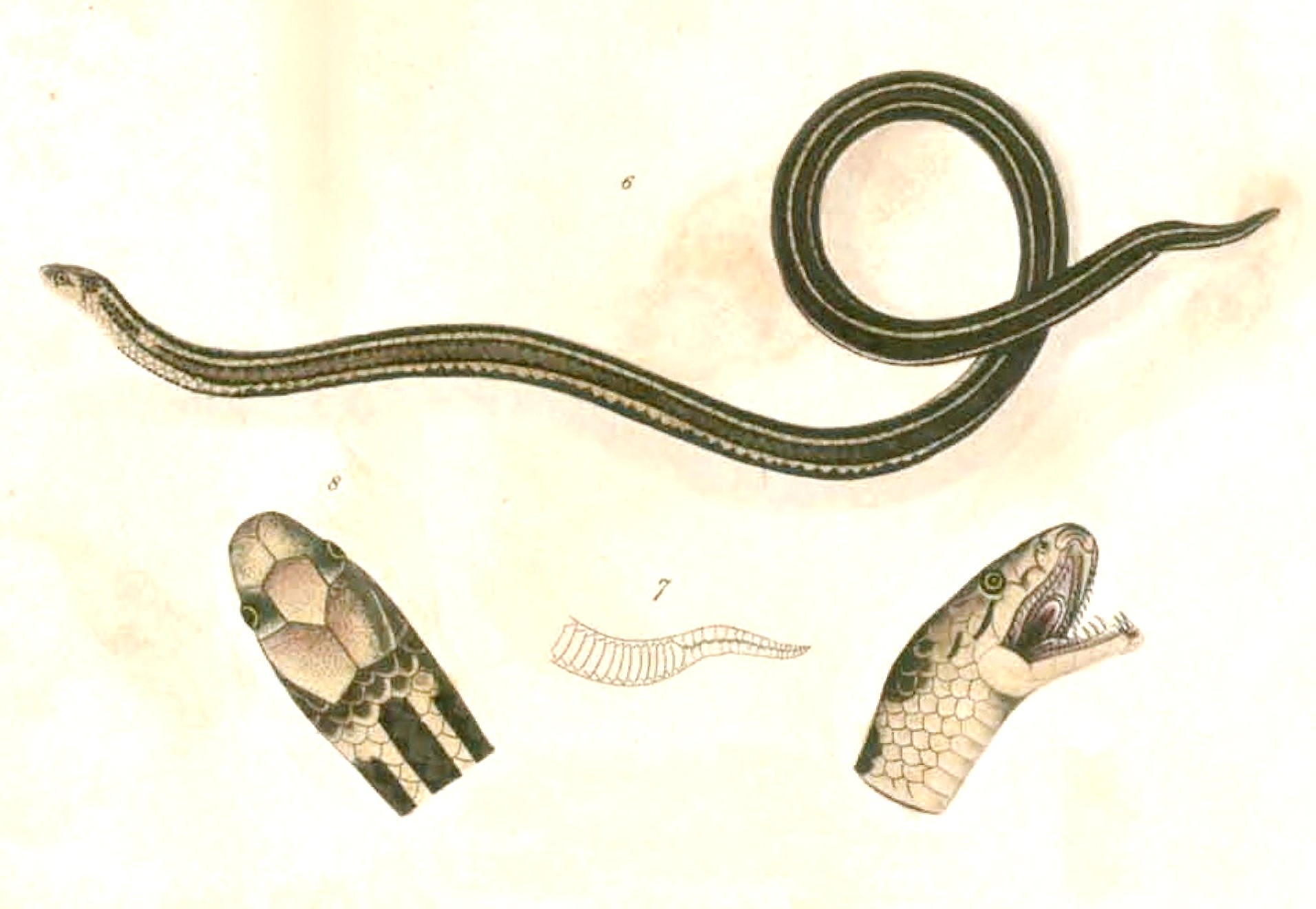
- Calamaria albiventer

Scientific classification
- Domain: Eukaryota
- Kingdom: Animalia
- Phylum: Chordata
- Class: Reptilia
- Order: Squamata
- Suborder: Serpentes
- Family: Colubridae
- Subfamily: Calamariinae

Genera
- 7 genera, see article.

= Calamariinae =

Subfamily of snakes

The Calamariinae are a subfamily of colubrid snakes, commonly known as reed snakes, that are found in southern and southeastern Asia. They are most diverse in Indonesia, especially Sumatra and Borneo. The subfamily contains 90 species in seven genera. Very few specimens of most species have been collected.

The genus Calamaria has far more species (60) than all other genera in the subfamily combined, and its geographic range is more extensive than the combined ranges of the other genera. Consequently, more is known about it than about the other genera, although Calamariinae is still among the most poorly known groups of snakes in the world, especially for its relatively high species diversity.

Calamariine snakes are small, burrowing, forest-dwelling snakes that eat worms. Very few species of colubrid snakes have as few dorsal scale rows (13) as Calamaria, and none have more extensive fusion of the head scales. Most species have laterally compressed, flask-shaped maxillary teeth.

== Genera ==
- Calamaria (70 species)
- Calamorhabdium (2 species)
- Collorhabdium (1 species)
- Etheridgeum (1 species)
- Macrocalamus (8 species)
- Pseudorabdion (15 species)
- Rabdion (2 species)
