= Hemidactylus kimbulae =

Scientific classification
- Kingdom: Animalia
- Phylum: Chordata
- Class: Reptilia
- Order: Squamata
- Suborder: Gekkota
- Family: Gekkonidae
- Genus: Hemidactylus
- Species: H. kimbulae

Binomial name
- Hemidactylus kimbulae Amarasinghe, Karunarathna, Campbell, Madawala, & de Silva, 2021

Species of lizard

Hemidactylus kimbulae is a species of gecko. It is endemic to Sri Lanka.
