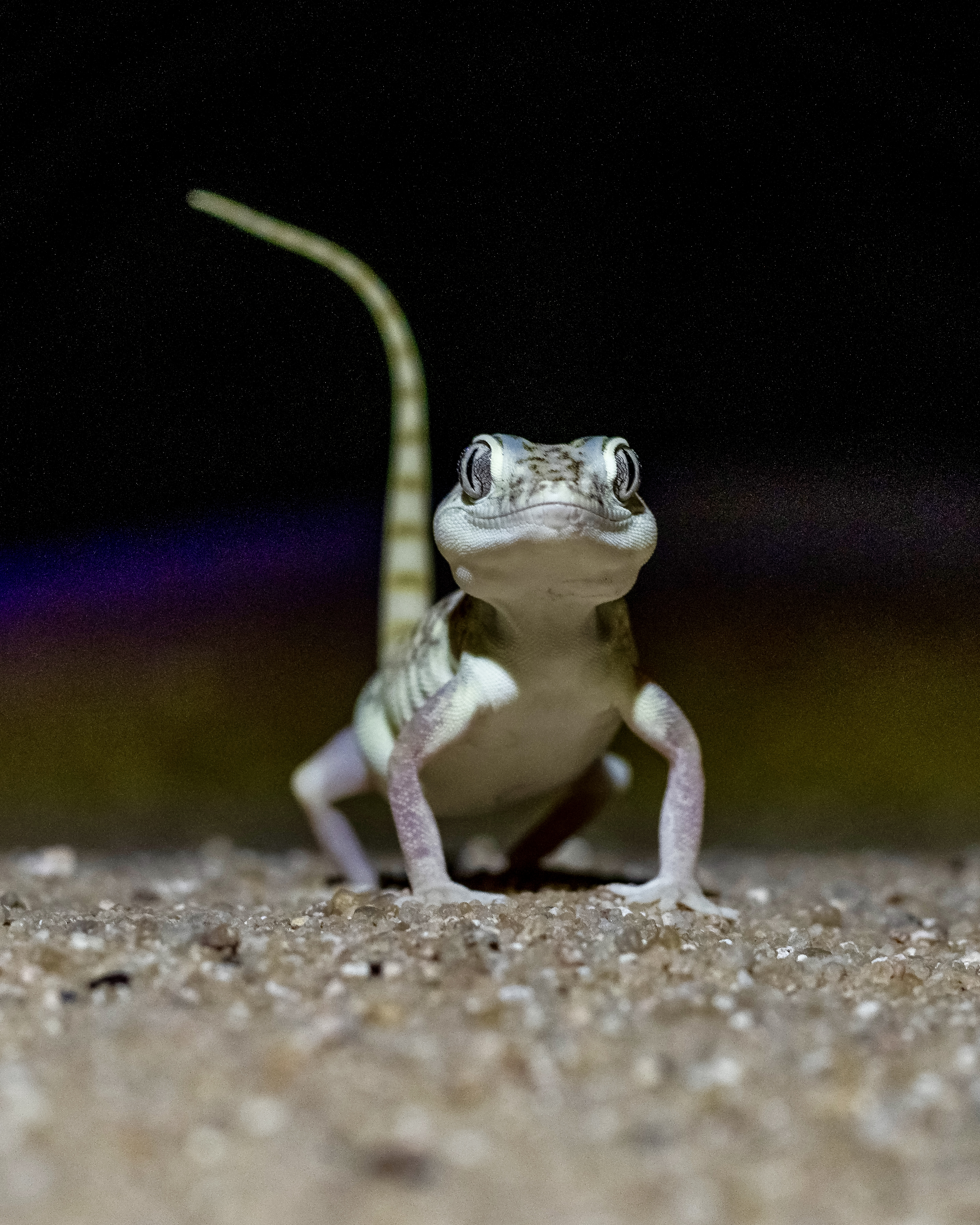

Scientific classification
- Kingdom: Animalia
- Phylum: Chordata
- Class: Reptilia
- Order: Squamata
- Suborder: Gekkota
- Family: Gekkonidae
- Genus: Hemidactylus
- Species: H. lavadeserticus

Binomial name
- Hemidactylus lavadeserticus Moravec & Böhme, 1997

Synonyms
- Hemidactylus turcicus lavadeserticus

= Syrian house gecko =

Species of lizard

The Syrian house gecko (Hemidactylus lavadeserticus) is a species of gecko. It is endemic to Syria.
