= Kamdem Toham's gecko =

Conservation status
- Least Concern (IUCN 3.1)

Scientific classification
- Kingdom: Animalia
- Phylum: Chordata
- Class: Reptilia
- Order: Squamata
- Suborder: Gekkota
- Family: Gekkonidae
- Genus: Hemidactylus
- Species: H. kamdemtohami

Binomial name
- Hemidactylus kamdemtohami Bauer & Pauwels, 2002

Species of lizard

Kamdem Toham's gecko (Hemidactylus kamdemtohami) is a species of gecko, a lizard in the family Gekkonidae. The species is native to western Central Africa.

== Etymology ==
The specific name, kamdemtohami, is in honor of Cameroonese zoologist André Kamdem Toham.

== Geographic range ==
H. kamdemtohami is found in Gabon, Equatorial Guinea, and Cameroon.

== Habitat ==
The preferred natural habitat of H. kamdemtohami is forest, at altitudes of 500–1,200 m (1,600–3,900 ft).

== Behavior ==
H. kamdemtohami is nocturnal and arboreal.

== Reproduction ==
H. kamdemtohami is oviparous. Clutch size is two eggs.
