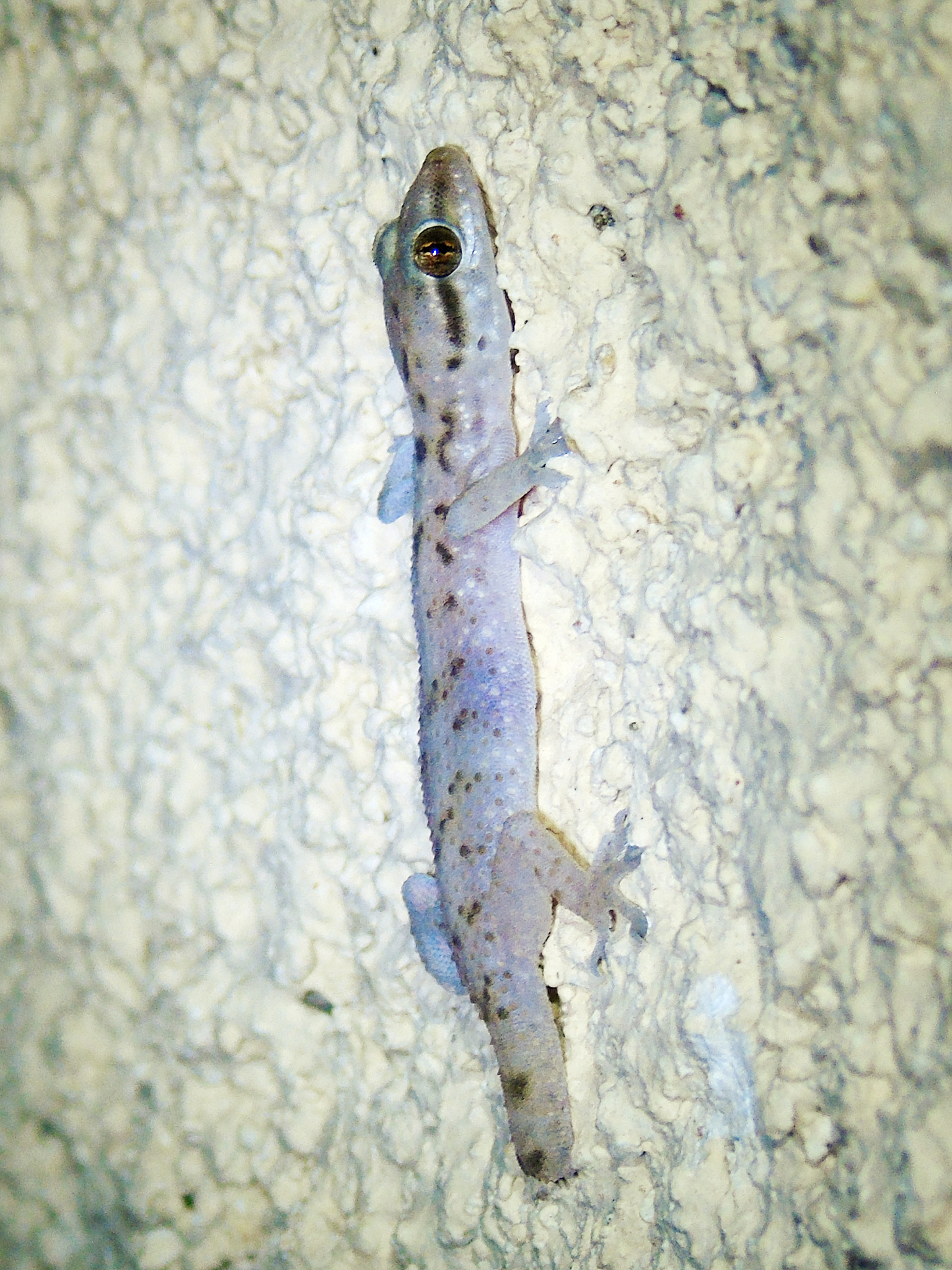

Scientific classification
- Kingdom: Animalia
- Phylum: Chordata
- Class: Reptilia
- Order: Squamata
- Suborder: Gekkota
- Family: Gekkonidae
- Genus: Hemidactylus
- Species: H. hajarensis

Binomial name
- Hemidactylus hajarensis Carranza & Arnold, 2012

= Hemidactylus hajarensis =

Species of lizard

Hemidactylus hajarensis is a species of house gecko from Oman.
