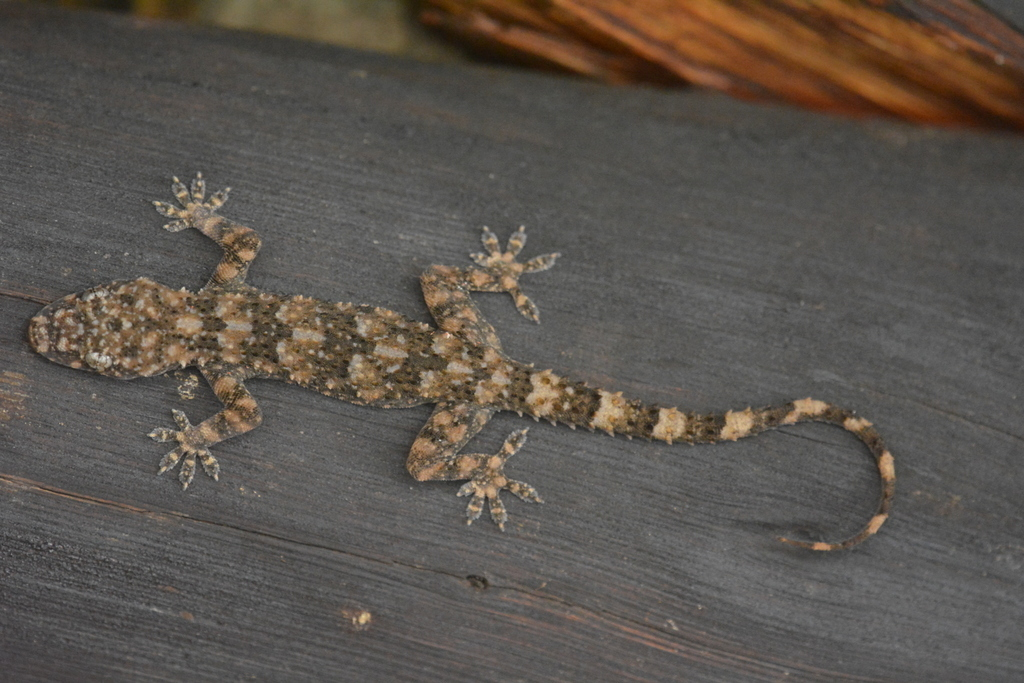

Conservation status
- Least Concern (IUCN 3.1)

Scientific classification
- Kingdom: Animalia
- Phylum: Chordata
- Class: Reptilia
- Order: Squamata
- Suborder: Gekkota
- Family: Gekkonidae
- Genus: Hemidactylus
- Species: H. tasmani

Binomial name
- Hemidactylus tasmani Hewitt, 1932

= Tasmanian leaf-toed gecko =

Species of lizard

The Tasmanian leaf-toed gecko (Hemidactylus tasmani), also known commonly as Tasman's tropical house gecko, is a species of lizard in the family Gekkonidae. The species is endemic to Zimbabwe.

== Etymology ==
The specific name, tasmani, is in honor of Father Kenneth Robert Tasman (1890–1968), who was a Jesuit priest, missionary, and herpetologist in Southern Rhodesia (now Zimbabwe).

== Description ==
Adults of H. tasmani have a snout-to-vent length (SVL) of 6.5–7.5 cm (2.6–3.0 in).

== Reproduction ==
H. tasmani is oviparous.
