= Hemidactylus modestus =

Conservation status
- Data Deficient (IUCN 3.1)

Scientific classification
- Kingdom: Animalia
- Phylum: Chordata
- Class: Reptilia
- Order: Squamata
- Suborder: Gekkota
- Family: Gekkonidae
- Genus: Hemidactylus
- Species: H. modestus

Binomial name
- Hemidactylus modestus (Günther, 1894)

Synonyms
- Bunocnemis modestus

Species of lizard

Hemidactylus modestus, also known as the moderate leaf-toed gecko or Tana River gecko, is a species of gecko. It is endemic to Kenya.
