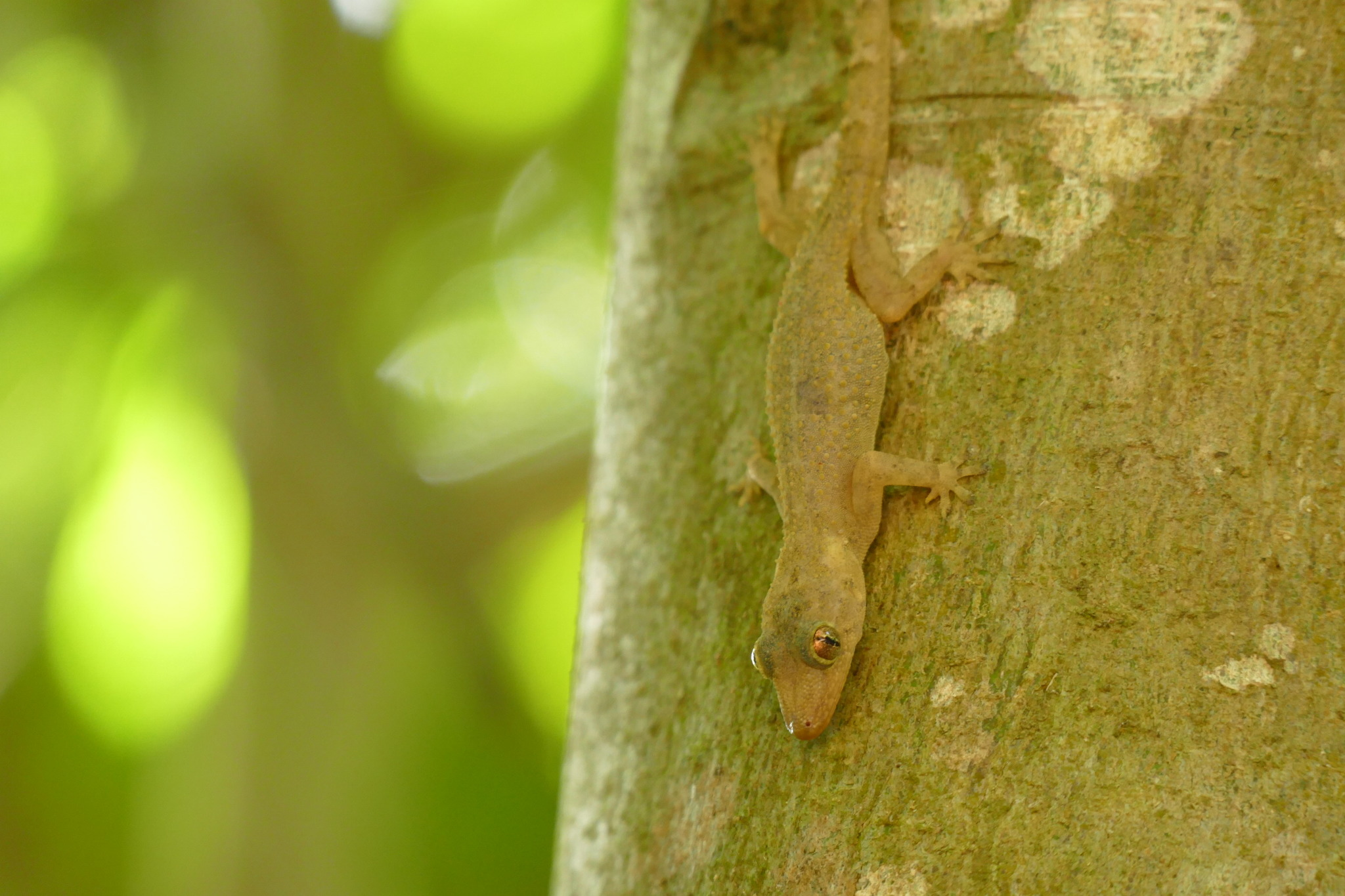

Scientific classification
- Kingdom: Animalia
- Phylum: Chordata
- Class: Reptilia
- Order: Squamata
- Suborder: Gekkota
- Family: Gekkonidae
- Genus: Hemidactylus
- Species: H. mrimaensis

Binomial name
- Hemidactylus mrimaensis Malonza & Bauer, 2014

= Kaya gecko =

Species of lizard

The Kaya gecko (Hemidactylus mrimaensis) is a species of gecko. It is endemic to coastal Kenya.
