= Bioko leaf-toed gecko =

Conservation status
- Data Deficient (IUCN 3.1)

Scientific classification
- Kingdom: Animalia
- Phylum: Chordata
- Class: Reptilia
- Order: Squamata
- Suborder: Gekkota
- Family: Gekkonidae
- Genus: Hemidactylus
- Species: H. biokoensis

Binomial name
- Hemidactylus biokoensis Wagner, Leaché & Fujita, 2014

Species of lizard

The Bioko leaf-toed gecko (Hemidactylus biokoensis) is a species of forest geckos from Bioko Island (Equatorial Guinea). It occurs in the coastal areas of the island and it has also been found in a forest immediately adjacent to the beach.

Hemidactylus biokoensis can grow to 81 mm (3.2 in) in snout–vent length and about 167 mm (6.6 in) in total length.
