= Hemidactylus inexpectatus =

Scientific classification
- Kingdom: Animalia
- Phylum: Chordata
- Class: Reptilia
- Order: Squamata
- Suborder: Gekkota
- Family: Gekkonidae
- Genus: Hemidactylus
- Species: H. inexpectatus

Binomial name
- Hemidactylus inexpectatus Carranza & Arnold, 2012

Species of lizard

Hemidactylus inexpectatus is a species of house gecko from Oman.
