= Hemidactylus romeshkanicus =

Scientific classification
- Domain: Eukaryota
- Kingdom: Animalia
- Phylum: Chordata
- Class: Reptilia
- Order: Squamata
- Infraorder: Gekkota
- Family: Gekkonidae
- Genus: Hemidactylus
- Species: H. romeshkanicus

Binomial name
- Hemidactylus romeshkanicus Torki, 2011

Species of lizard

Hemidactylus romeshkanicus is a species of gecko. It is endemic to Iran.
