= Hemidactylus easai =

Scientific classification
- Kingdom: Animalia
- Phylum: Chordata
- Class: Reptilia
- Order: Squamata
- Suborder: Gekkota
- Family: Gekkonidae
- Genus: Hemidactylus
- Species: H. easai

Binomial name
- Hemidactylus easai Das, Pal, Siddharth, Palot, Deepak, & Narayanan, 2022

Species of lizard

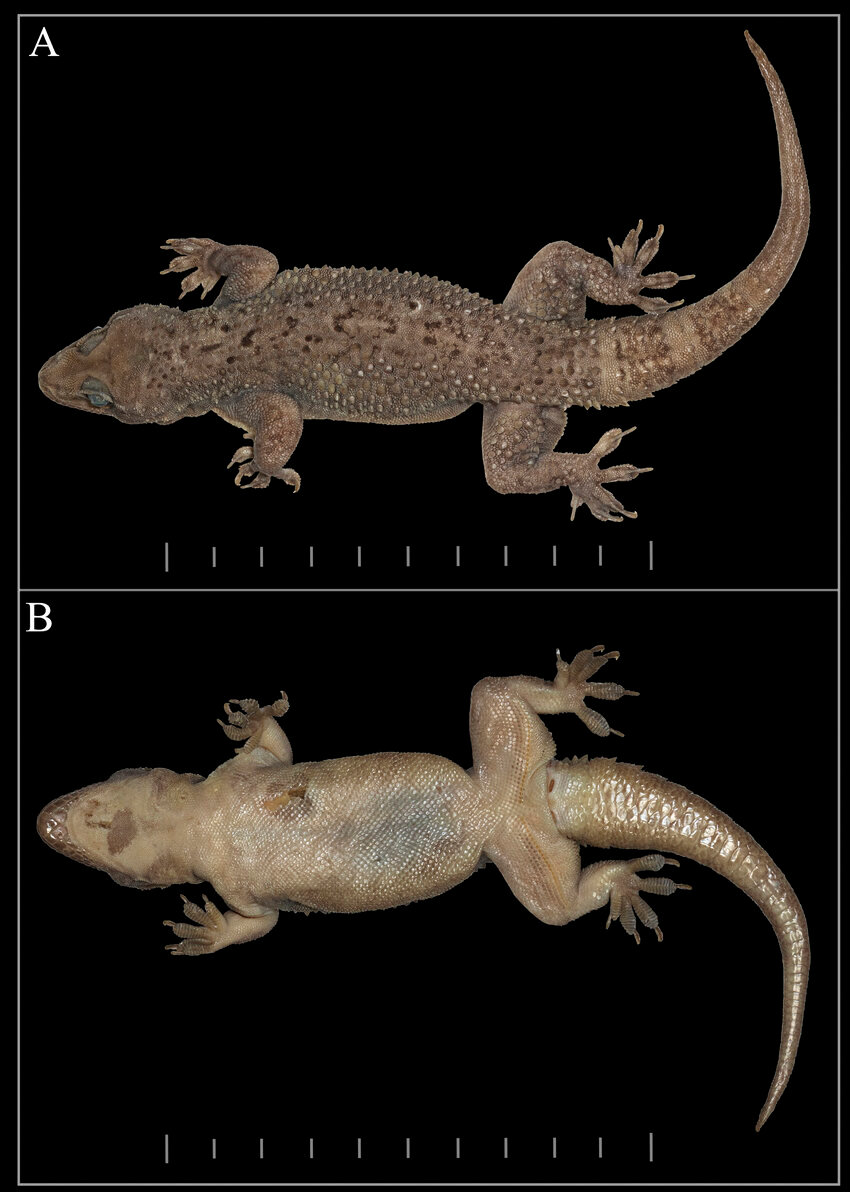
Holotype of Hemidactylus easai, seen from above and below.

Hemidactylus easai is a species of gecko endemic to India.
