= Parker's leaf-toed gecko =

Scientific classification
- Domain: Eukaryota
- Kingdom: Animalia
- Phylum: Chordata
- Class: Reptilia
- Order: Squamata
- Infraorder: Gekkota
- Family: Gekkonidae
- Genus: Hemidactylus
- Species: H. megalops

Binomial name
- Hemidactylus megalops Parker, 1932

Species of lizard

Parkers leaf-toed gecko (Hemidactylus megalops) is a species of gecko. It is endemic to Somalia.
