= Hemidactylus dawudazraqi =

Scientific classification
- Kingdom: Animalia
- Phylum: Chordata
- Class: Reptilia
- Order: Squamata
- Suborder: Gekkota
- Family: Gekkonidae
- Genus: Hemidactylus
- Species: H. dawudazraqi

Binomial name
- Hemidactylus dawudazraqi Moravec, Kratochvíl, Amr, Jandzik, Šmíd, & Gvoždík, 2011

Species of lizard

Hemidactylus dawudazraqi is a species of gecko. It is found in Jordan and Syria.
