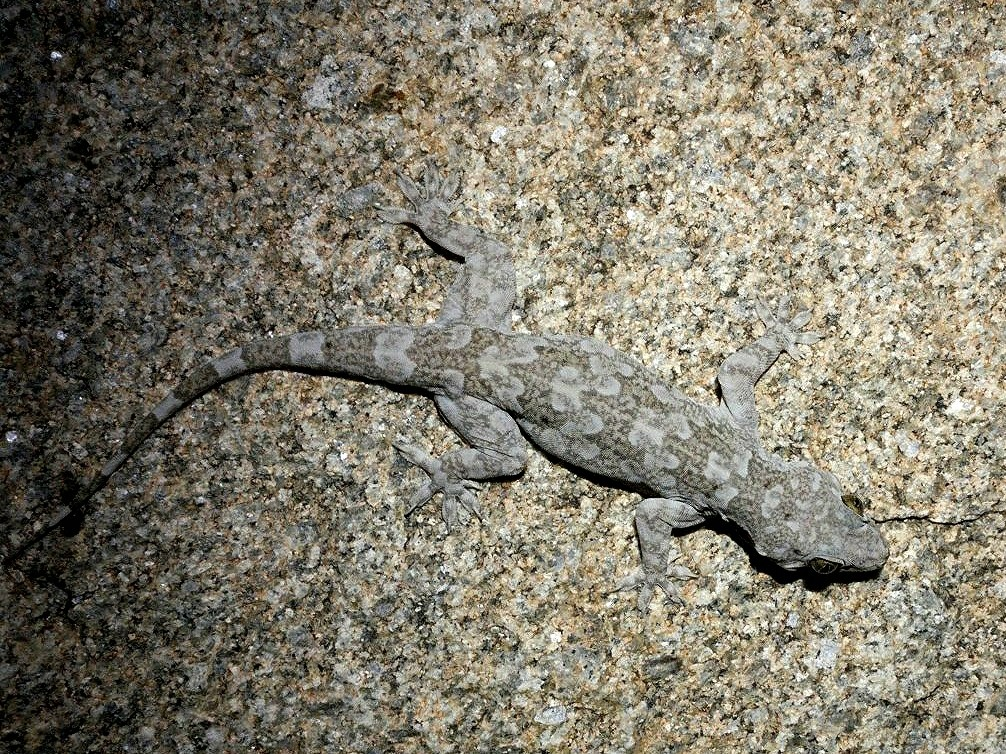

Scientific classification
- Kingdom: Animalia
- Phylum: Chordata
- Class: Reptilia
- Order: Squamata
- Suborder: Gekkota
- Family: Gekkonidae
- Genus: Hemidactylus
- Species: H. raya

Binomial name
- Hemidactylus raya Kumar, Srinivasulu, & Srinivasulu, 2022

= Hemidactylus raya =

Species of lizard

Hemidactylus raya is a species of gecko. It is endemic to India.
