= Hemidactylus awashensis =

Scientific classification
- Domain: Eukaryota
- Kingdom: Animalia
- Phylum: Chordata
- Class: Reptilia
- Order: Squamata
- Infraorder: Gekkota
- Family: Gekkonidae
- Genus: Hemidactylus
- Species: H. awashensis

Binomial name
- Hemidactylus awashensis Šmíd et al., 2015

Species of lizard

Hemidactylus awashensis is a species of house gecko from Ethiopia. It grows to 54.8 mm (2.16 in) in snout–vent length.
