= Hemidactylus tropidolepis =

Scientific classification
- Domain: Eukaryota
- Kingdom: Animalia
- Phylum: Chordata
- Class: Reptilia
- Order: Squamata
- Infraorder: Gekkota
- Family: Gekkonidae
- Genus: Hemidactylus
- Species: H. tropidolepis

Binomial name
- Hemidactylus tropidolepis Mocquard, 1888

Synonyms
- Teratolepis tropidolepis

Species of lizard

Hemidactylus tropidolepis, also known as Mocquard's leaf-toed gecko or Ogaden gecko, is a species of gecko. It is found in eastern Africa (Ethiopia, Somalia, and Kenya).
