= Hemidactylus srikanthani =

Scientific classification
- Kingdom: Animalia
- Phylum: Chordata
- Order: Squamata
- Suborder: Gekkota
- Family: Gekkonidae
- Genus: Hemidactylus
- Species: H. srikanthani

Binomial name
- Hemidactylus srikanthani Adhikari, Achyuthan, Kumar, Khot, Shreeram, & Ganesh, 2022

Species of lizard

Hemidactylus srikanthani is a species of gecko. It is endemic to India.
