= Hemidactylus jubensis =

Scientific classification
- Domain: Eukaryota
- Kingdom: Animalia
- Phylum: Chordata
- Class: Reptilia
- Order: Squamata
- Infraorder: Gekkota
- Family: Gekkonidae
- Genus: Hemidactylus
- Species: H. jubensis

Binomial name
- Hemidactylus jubensis Boulenger, 1895

Species of lizard

Hemidactylus jubensis, also known as the Ethiopian gecko or Mrioen leaf-toed gecko, is a species of gecko. It is found in Ethiopia, and Somaliland.
