= Snakescale leaf-toed gecko =

Scientific classification
- Domain: Eukaryota
- Kingdom: Animalia
- Phylum: Chordata
- Class: Reptilia
- Order: Squamata
- Infraorder: Gekkota
- Family: Gekkonidae
- Genus: Hemidactylus
- Species: H. ophiolepis

Binomial name
- Hemidactylus ophiolepis Boulenger, 1903

Synonyms
- Teratolepis ophiolepis

Species of lizard

The snakescale leaf-toed gecko (Hemidactylus ophiolepis) is a species of gecko. It is found in Ethiopia and Somaliland.
