= Lanza's leaf-toed gecko =

Scientific classification
- Kingdom: Animalia
- Phylum: Chordata
- Class: Reptilia
- Order: Squamata
- Suborder: Gekkota
- Family: Gekkonidae
- Genus: Hemidactylus
- Species: H. ophiolepoides

Binomial name
- Hemidactylus ophiolepoides Lanza, 1978

Species of lizard

Lanza's leaf-toed gecko (Hemidactylus ophiolepoides) is a species of gecko. It is found in Ethiopia and Somaliland.
