= Hemidactylus thayene =

Scientific classification
- Kingdom: Animalia
- Phylum: Chordata
- Class: Reptilia
- Order: Squamata
- Suborder: Gekkota
- Family: Gekkonidae
- Genus: Hemidactylus
- Species: H. thayene

Binomial name
- Hemidactylus thayene Zug & McMahan, 2007

Species of lizard

Hemidactylus thayene is a species of gecko. It is endemic to Myanmar.
