= Hemidactylus shihraensis =

Scientific classification
- Kingdom: Animalia
- Phylum: Chordata
- Class: Reptilia
- Order: Squamata
- Suborder: Gekkota
- Family: Gekkonidae
- Genus: Hemidactylus
- Species: H. shihraensis

Binomial name
- Hemidactylus shihraensis Busais & Joger, 2011

Species of lizard

Hemidactylus shihraensis is a species of gecko. It is endemic to Yemen.
