= Hemidactylus ulii =

Scientific classification
- Kingdom: Animalia
- Phylum: Chordata
- Class: Reptilia
- Order: Squamata
- Suborder: Gekkota
- Family: Gekkonidae
- Genus: Hemidactylus
- Species: H. ulii

Binomial name
- Hemidactylus ulii Šmíd, Moravec, Kratochvíl, Gvoždík, Nasher, Busais, Wilms, Shobrak, & Carranza, 2013

Species of lizard

Hemidactylus ulii is a species of gecko. It is endemic to southwestern Yemen.
