= Hemidactylus chikhaldaraensis =

Scientific classification
- Kingdom: Animalia
- Phylum: Chordata
- Class: Reptilia
- Order: Squamata
- Suborder: Gekkota
- Family: Gekkonidae
- Genus: Hemidactylus
- Species: H. chikhaldaraensis

Binomial name
- Hemidactylus chikhaldaraensis Agarwal, Bauer, Giri, & Khandekar, 2019

Species of lizard

Hemidactylus chikhaldaraensis, the Chikhaldara brookiish gecko is a species of gecko. It is endemic to India.
