= Common leaf-toed gecko =

Scientific classification
- Domain: Eukaryota
- Kingdom: Animalia
- Phylum: Chordata
- Class: Reptilia
- Order: Squamata
- Infraorder: Gekkota
- Family: Gekkonidae
- Genus: Hemidactylus
- Species: H. laevis

Binomial name
- Hemidactylus laevis Boulenger, 1901

Species of lizard

The common leaf-toed gecko (Hemidactylus laevis) is a species of gecko. It is endemic to Somaliland. Despite its vernacular name, it is very rare.
