= Newton's leaf-toed gecko =

Conservation status
- Data Deficient (IUCN 3.1)

Scientific classification
- Kingdom: Animalia
- Phylum: Chordata
- Class: Reptilia
- Order: Squamata
- Suborder: Gekkota
- Family: Gekkonidae
- Genus: Hemidactylus
- Species: H. newtoni

Binomial name
- Hemidactylus newtoni Ferreira, 1897

Species of lizard

Newton's leaf-toed gecko (Hemidactylus newtoni) is a species of lizard in the family Gekkonidae. The species is indigenous to Equatorial Guinea.

== Etymology ==
The specific name, newtoni, is in honor of Portuguese botanist Colonel Francesco Newton.

== Geographic distribution ==
Hemidactylus newtoni is endemic to the island of Annobón in Equatorial Guinea.

== Reproduction ==
Hemidactylus newtoni is oviparous.

== Taxonomy ==
Hemidactylus newtoni was described and named by J. Bethencourt Ferreira in 1897. The species is known only from the type series of seven specimens collected in 1893.
