= Hemidactylus adensis =

Scientific classification
- Domain: Eukaryota
- Kingdom: Animalia
- Phylum: Chordata
- Class: Reptilia
- Order: Squamata
- Infraorder: Gekkota
- Family: Gekkonidae
- Genus: Hemidactylus
- Species: H. adensis

Binomial name
- Hemidactylus adensis Šmíd et al., 2015

Species of lizard

Hemidactylus adensis is a species of house gecko from Yemen. It grows to 41.8 mm (1.65 in) in snout–vent length.
