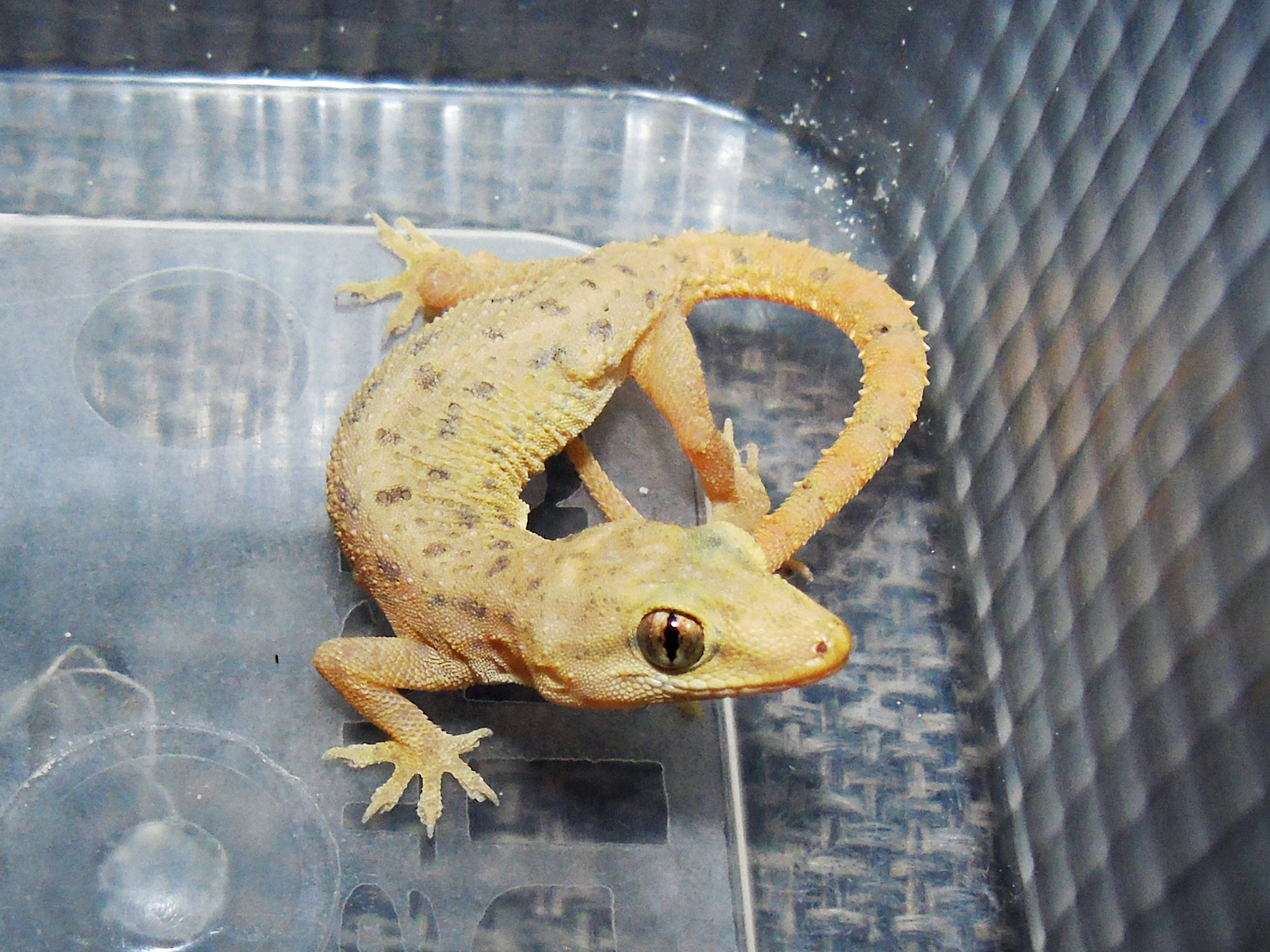

Conservation status
- Data Deficient (IUCN 3.1)

Scientific classification
- Kingdom: Animalia
- Phylum: Chordata
- Class: Reptilia
- Order: Squamata
- Suborder: Gekkota
- Family: Gekkonidae
- Genus: Hemidactylus
- Species: H. kushmorensis

Binomial name
- Hemidactylus kushmorensis Murray, 1884

= Kushmore house gecko =

Species of lizard

The Kushmore house gecko (Hemidactylus kushmorensis) is a species of gecko. It is endemic to eastern Pakistan, ranging as far east as Haridwar, in the Himalayan foothills of Uttarakhand, India.
