= Hemidactylus albituberculatus =

Conservation status
- Least Concern (IUCN 3.1)

Scientific classification
- Kingdom: Animalia
- Phylum: Chordata
- Class: Reptilia
- Order: Squamata
- Suborder: Gekkota
- Family: Gekkonidae
- Genus: Hemidactylus
- Species: H. albituberculatus

Binomial name
- Hemidactylus albituberculatus Trape, 2012

Species of lizard

Hemidactylus albituberculatus is a species of gecko. It is found in the Guinean savanna region of West Africa (Ivory Coast, Ghana, Togo, Benin, and Nigeria) and Cameroon.

Hemidactylus albituberculatus measure 60–75 mm (2.4–3.0 in) in snout–vent length.
