= Hemidactylus isolepis =

Scientific classification
- Domain: Eukaryota
- Kingdom: Animalia
- Phylum: Chordata
- Class: Reptilia
- Order: Squamata
- Infraorder: Gekkota
- Family: Gekkonidae
- Genus: Hemidactylus
- Species: H. isolepis

Binomial name
- Hemidactylus isolepis Boulenger, 1895

Synonyms
- Teratolepis isolepis

Species of lizard

Hemidactylus isolepis, also known as the scaly leaf-toed gecko or uniform-scaled gecko, is a species of gecko. It is found in Ethiopia, Somalia, Kenya, and probably in Sudan.
