= Hemidactylus vernayi =

Scientific classification
- Kingdom: Animalia
- Phylum: Chordata
- Class: Reptilia
- Order: Squamata
- Suborder: Gekkota
- Family: Gekkonidae
- Genus: Hemidactylus
- Species: H. vernayi

Binomial name
- Hemidactylus vernayi Ceriaco, Agarwal, Marques, & Bauer, 2020

Species of lizard

Hemidactylus vernayi is a species of house gecko from Angola.
