= Hemidactylus minutus =

Scientific classification
- Kingdom: Animalia
- Phylum: Chordata
- Class: Reptilia
- Order: Squamata
- Suborder: Gekkota
- Family: Gekkonidae
- Genus: Hemidactylus
- Species: H. minutus

Binomial name
- Hemidactylus minutus Vasconcelos & Carranza, 2014

Species of lizard

Hemidactylus minutus is a species of gecko. It is found from northeastern Oman to extreme eastern Yemen.
