= Hemidactylus afarensis =

Scientific classification
- Domain: Eukaryota
- Kingdom: Animalia
- Phylum: Chordata
- Class: Reptilia
- Order: Squamata
- Infraorder: Gekkota
- Family: Gekkonidae
- Genus: Hemidactylus
- Species: H. afarensis

Binomial name
- Hemidactylus afarensis Šmíd et al., 2020

Species of lizard

The Afar gecko (Hemidactylus afarensis) is a species of house gecko from Ethiopia and Eritrea.
