= Hemidactylus alfarraji =

Scientific classification
- Kingdom: Animalia
- Phylum: Chordata
- Class: Reptilia
- Order: Squamata
- Suborder: Gekkota
- Family: Gekkonidae
- Genus: Hemidactylus
- Species: H. alfarraji

Binomial name
- Hemidactylus alfarraji Šmid, Shobrak, Wilms, Joger, & Carranza, 2016

Species of lizard

Hemidactylus alfarraji is a species of gecko. It is endemic to Saudi Arabia.
