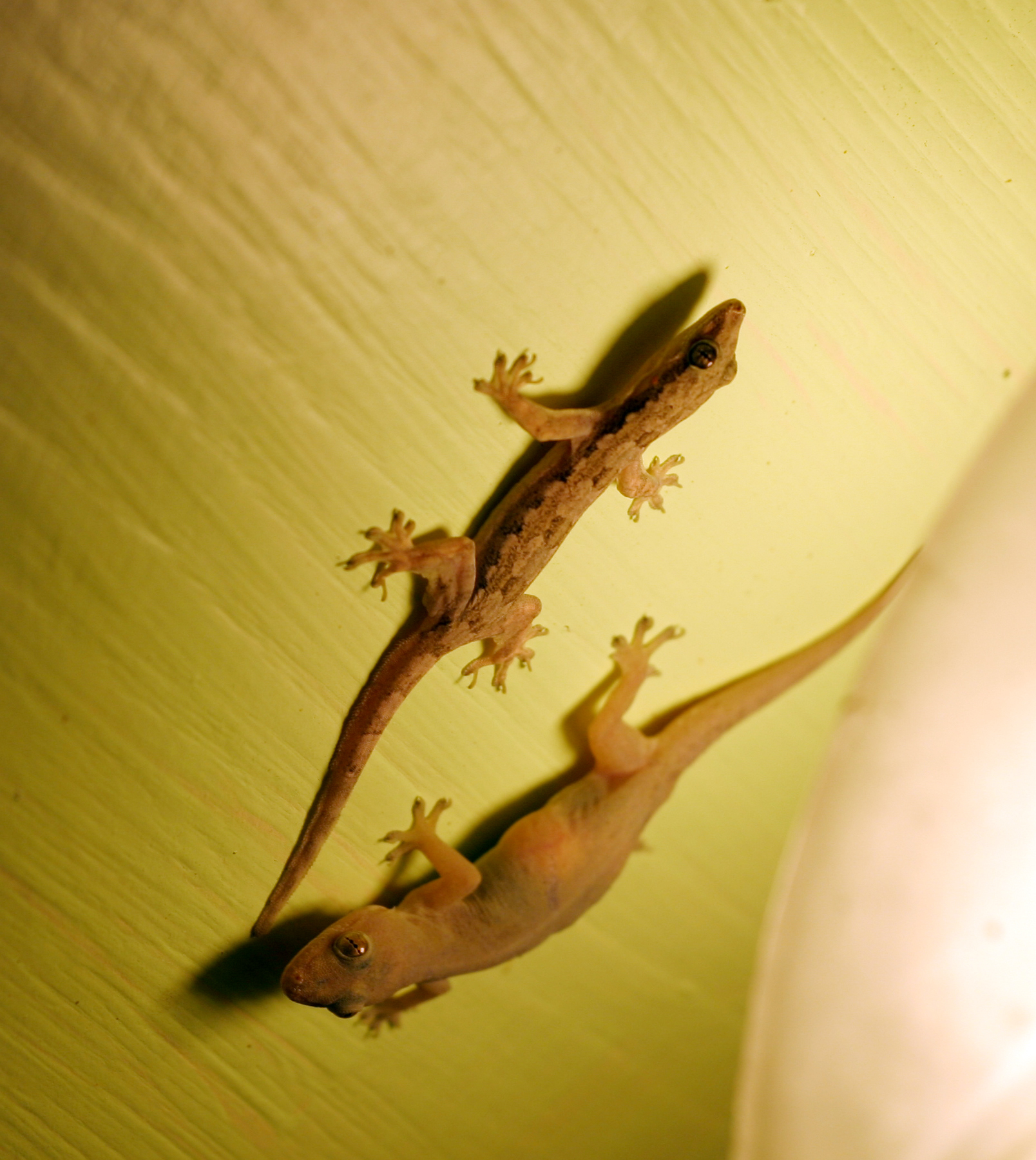
- Top: Flat-tailed house gecko Bottom: Asian house gecko

Scientific classification
- Kingdom: Animalia
- Phylum: Chordata
- Class: Reptilia
- Order: Squamata
- Suborder: Gekkota
- Family: Gekkonidae
- Subfamily: Gekkoninae
- Genus: Hemidactylus; Oken, 1817

Type species
- Gecko tuberculosus Raddi, 1823

Diversity
- 200 species, see text

Synonyms
- List (in alphabetical order): Aliurus E.R. Dunn & M.T. Dunn, 1940; Boltalia Gray, 1842; Bunocnemis Günther, 1894; Cosymbotus Fitzinger; Doryura Gray, 1845; Emydactylus Bocourt, 1870; Eurhous Fitzinger, 1861; Hoplopodion Fitzinger, 1843; Leiurus Gray, 1845 (non Ehrenberg, [1828]: preoccupied); Liurus Cope, 1862 (non Ehrenberg, 1831: preoccupied); Lophopholis M.A. Smith & Deraniyagala, 1934; Microdactylus Fitzinger, 1843 (non É. Geoffroy Saint-Hilaire, 1809: preoccupied); Nubilia Gray, 1845; Onychopus Fitzinger, 1843; Pnoepus Fitzinger, 1843; Tachybates Fitzinger, 1843; Velernesia Gray, 1845

= Hemidactylus =

Genus of common geckos

Hemidactylus (from Ancient Greek ἡμι- (hēmi-), meaning 'half', and δάκτυλος (dáktulos), meaning 'finger') is a genus of the common gecko family, Gekkonidae. It has 199 described species, newfound ones being described every few years. These geckos are found in all the tropical regions of the world, extending into the subtropical parts of Africa and Europe. They excel in colonizing oceanic islands by rafting on flotsam, and are for example found across most of Polynesia. In some archipelagoes, cryptic species complexes are found. Geckos like to live in and out of houses. They have been introduced to many areas around the world.

This species is closely related to the genus Gehyra, which belongs to the same family in Gekkonidae.

The species are typically known as house geckos, due to their readiness to adapt to and coexist with humans, and can be easily encountered in human habitations.

== Taxonomy ==
This genus was originally established by Lorenz Oken in 1817 for the species at that time known as Hemidactylus tuberculosus, and now described as the tropical house gecko (Hemidactylus mabouia). The species name in turn comes from the Greek words ἡμι hemi "half" and δάκτυλος dáktylos "fingers" because its toes have split or "half" lamella underneath them.

== Evolution ==
The origin of the genus Hemidactylus is still unclear as the higher level phylogeny is not well resolved. Moreover, much of the diversity in this group still remains to be discovered.

== Feces ==
A house gecko will usually confine its excretions to one area of a house. This is sometimes considered a nuisance by home owners, and may stain certain surfaces. The feces are approximately five (5) millimeters in length, two (2) millimeters wide, and dark brown (almost black) in color.

== Description ==
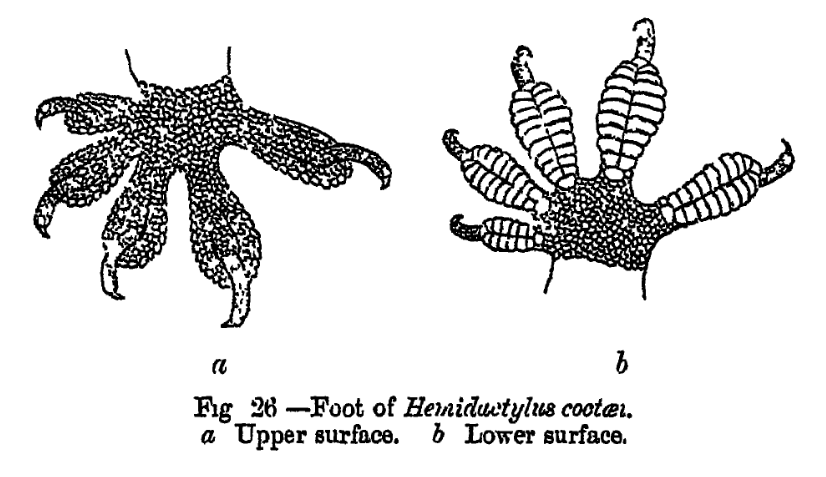
Foot upperside (left) and underside of the Oriental leaf-toed gecko (H. bowringii).

The dorsal scale pattern is either uniform or heterogeneous. The pupil of the eye is vertical. Males have pre-anal or femoral pores. Each finger or toe has a slender distal clawed joint, angularly bent and rising from within the extremity of the dilated portion.

The fingers and toes are free, or more or less webbed, and dilated; underneath they bear a straight line running down their lamellae, which is in a pattern resembling a paripinnate compound leaf. This leads to their other and more ambiguous common name, "leaf-toed geckos", used mainly for species from South Asia and its surroundings to prevent confusion with the many "leaf-toed" Gekkota not in Hemidactylus.

Some members of the genus, such as H. platyurus, are able to run quadrupedally across water by a partially surface tension-dependent mechanism distinct from the bipedal gait of basilisks.

== Communication ==
Like many other gecko species, species in the genus Hemidactylus are able to communicate with distinct vocalizations. Depending on the species, their vocalizations range from quiet clicks to short squeaks and chirps. For example, the Asian common house gecko (Hemidactylus frenatus) is notable for its distinctive chirping.

== Species ==
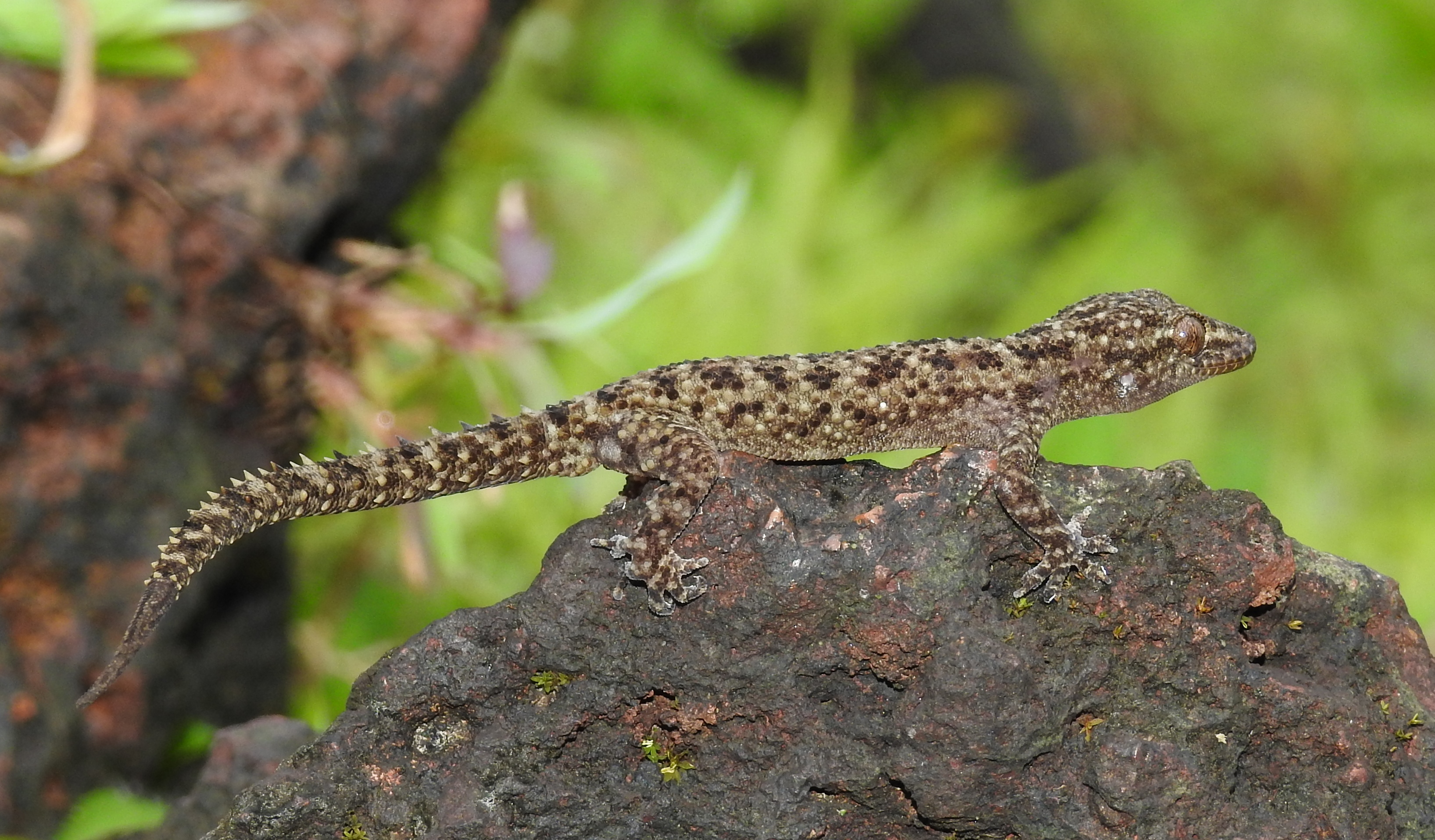
H. brookii

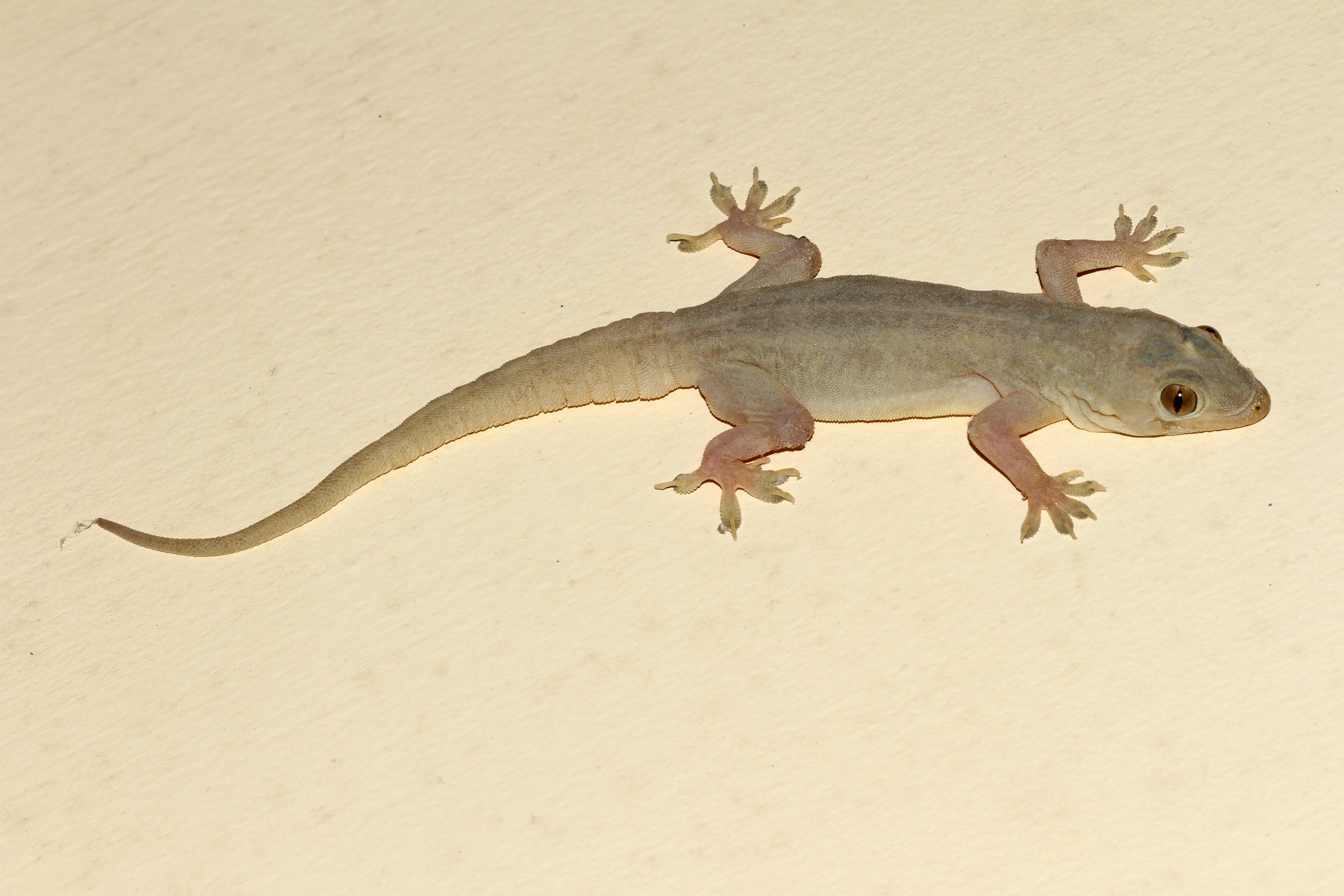
H. flaviviridus

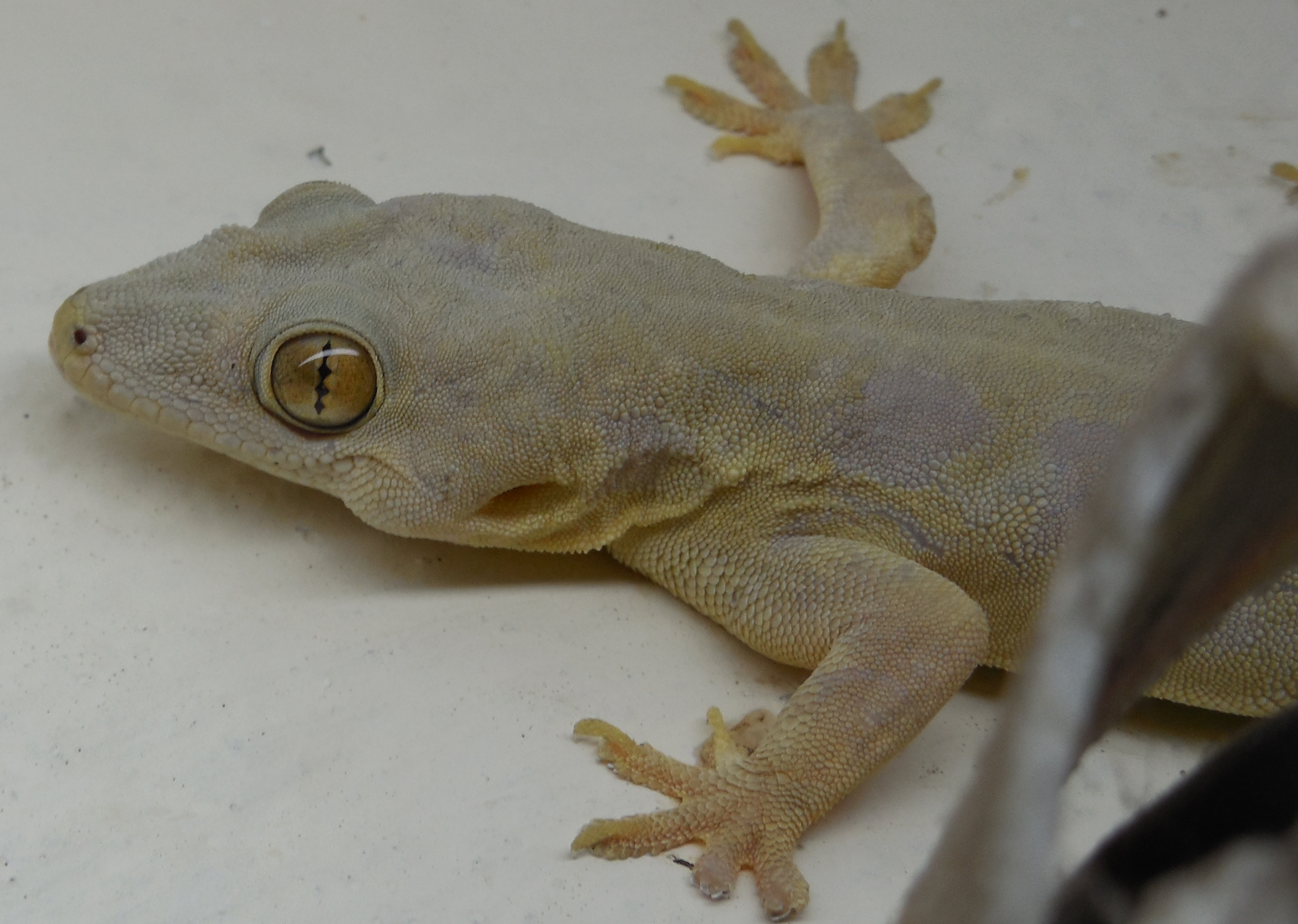
Adult common house gecko (H. frenatus) in Chennai, India

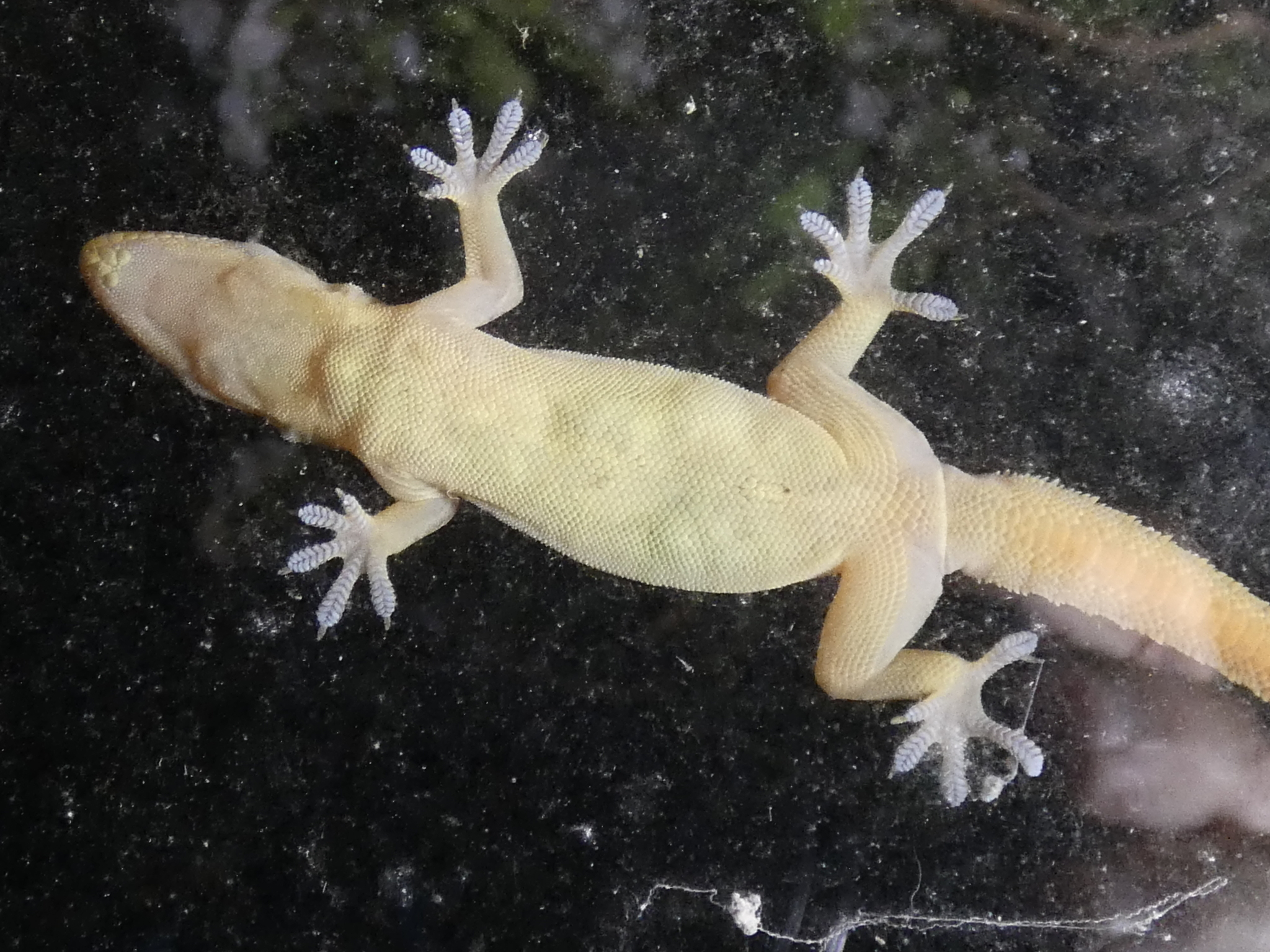
H. garnotii

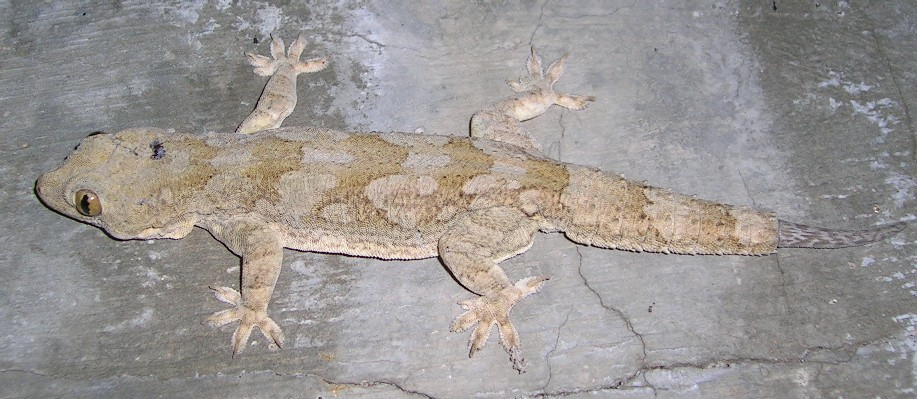
Adult giant leaf-toed gecko (H. giganteus) from Dindigul (Tamil Nadu, India)

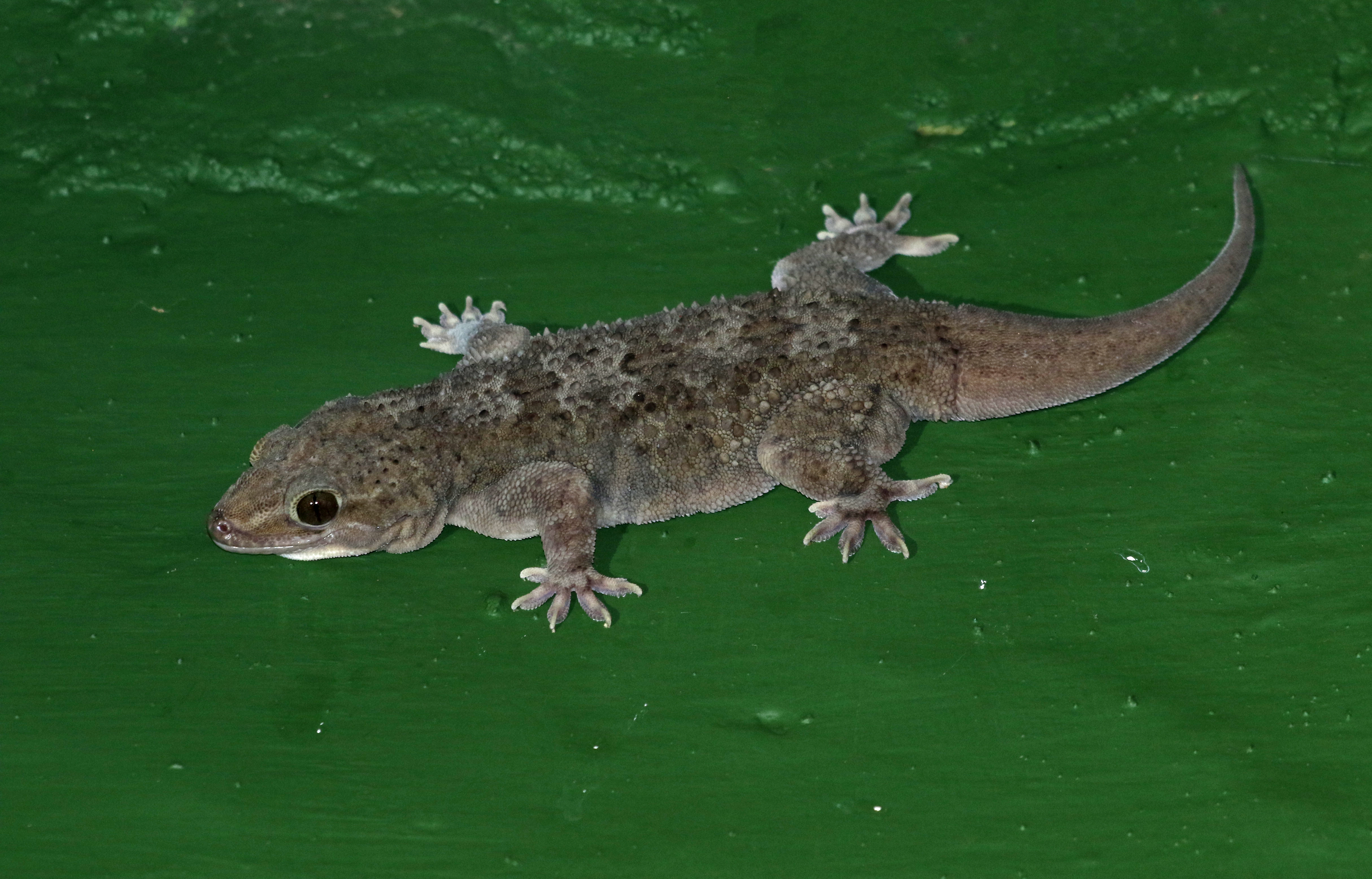
H. graniticolus

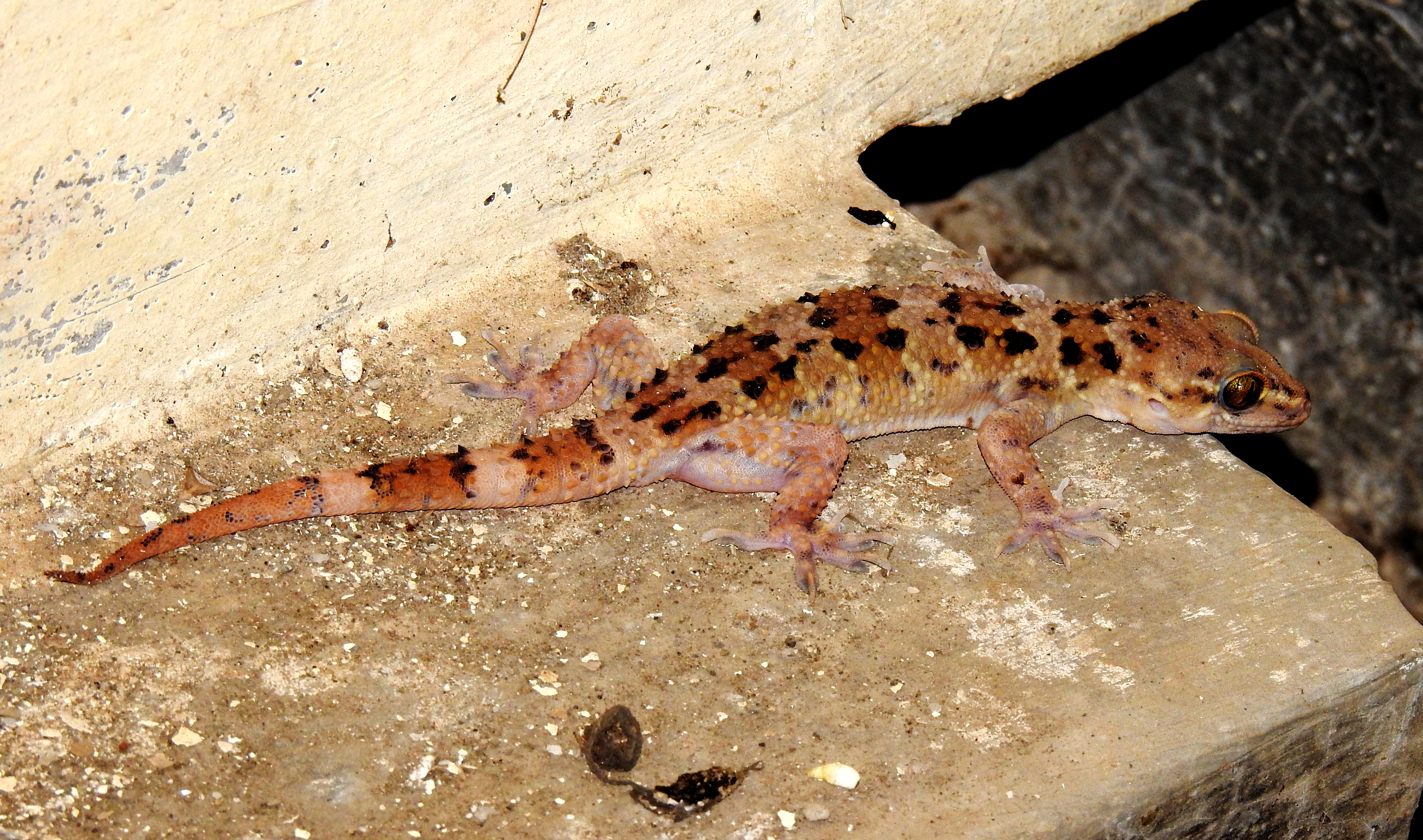
H. maculatus

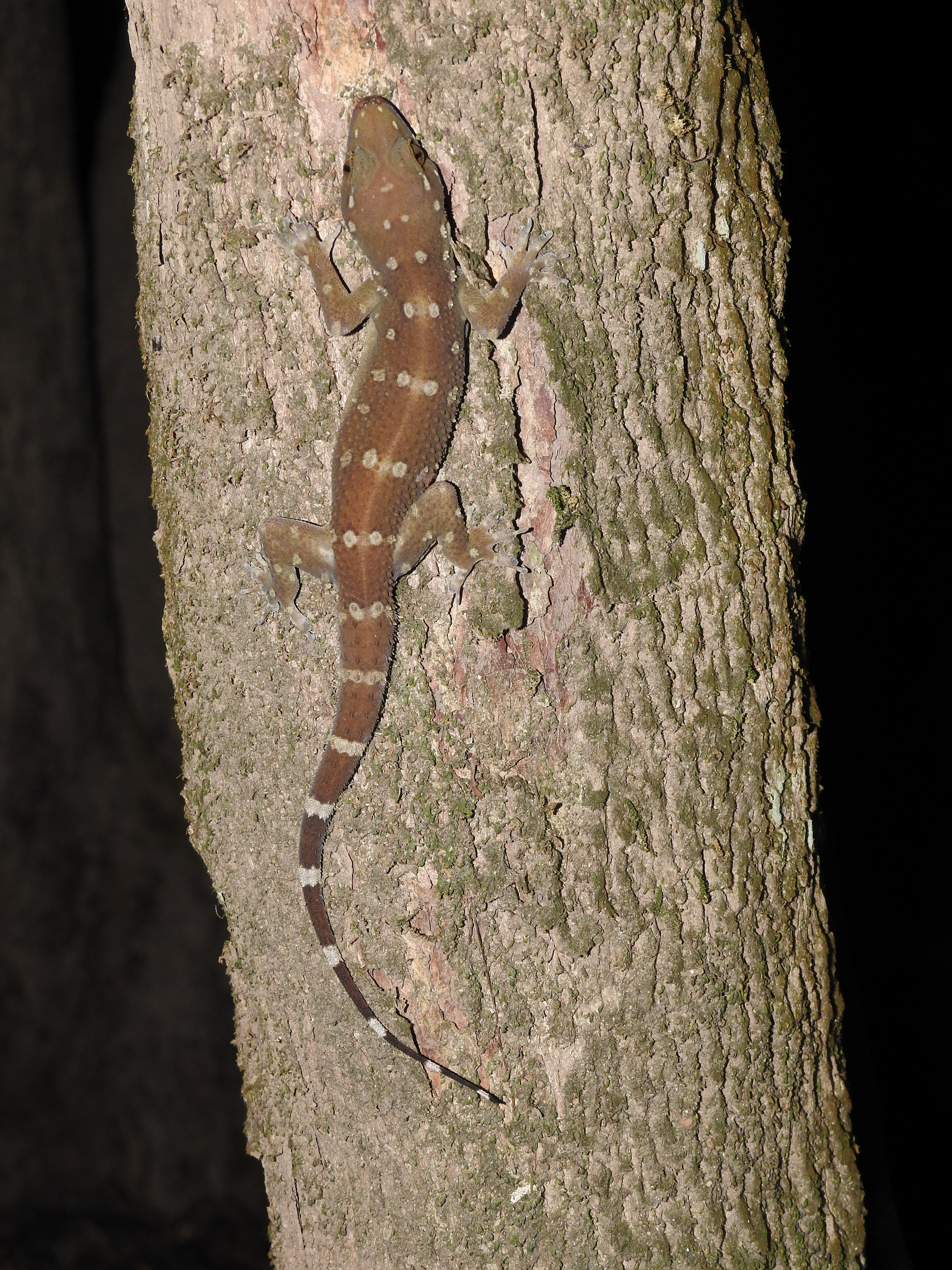
H. prashadi

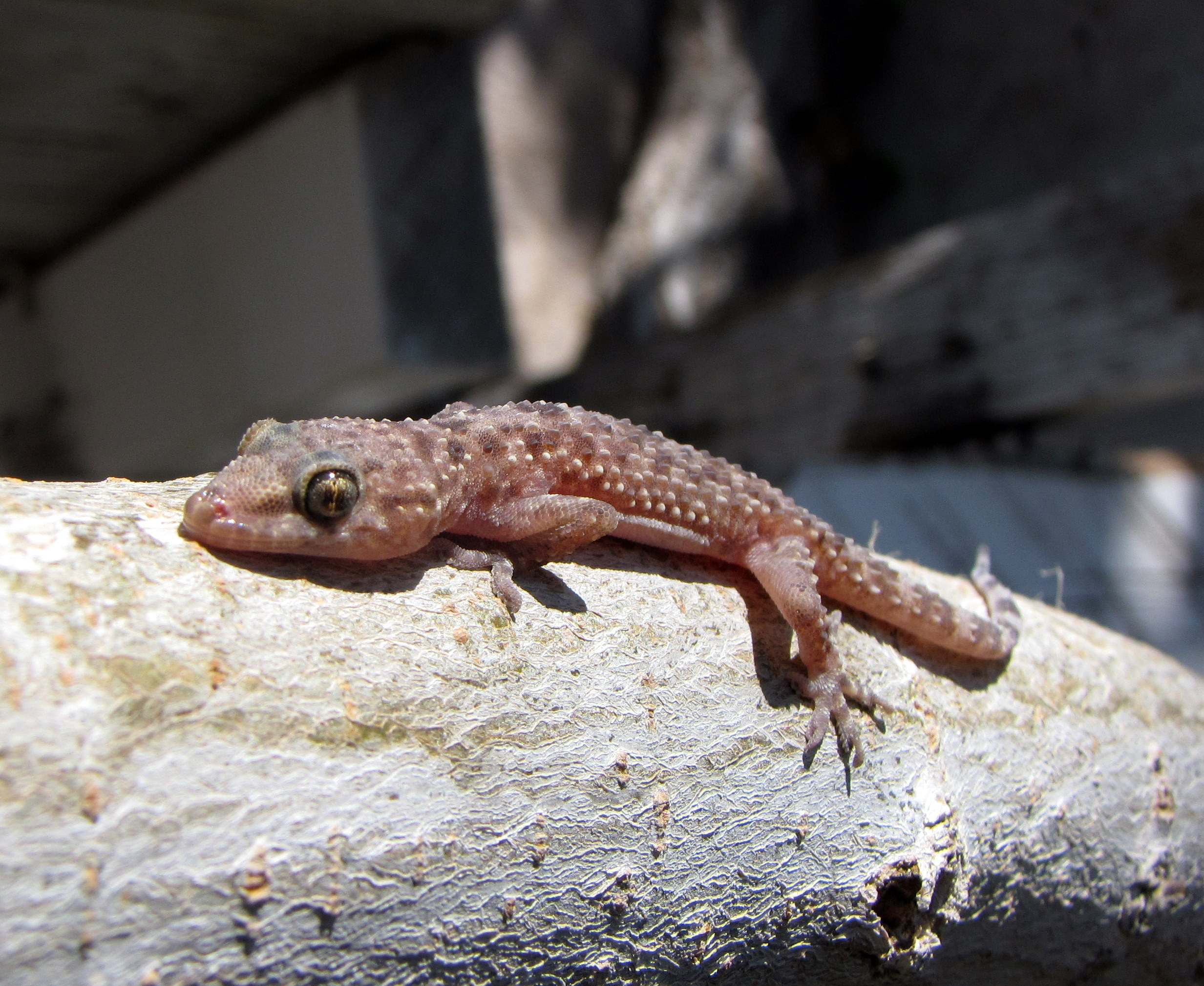
Mediterranean house gecko (H. turcicus)

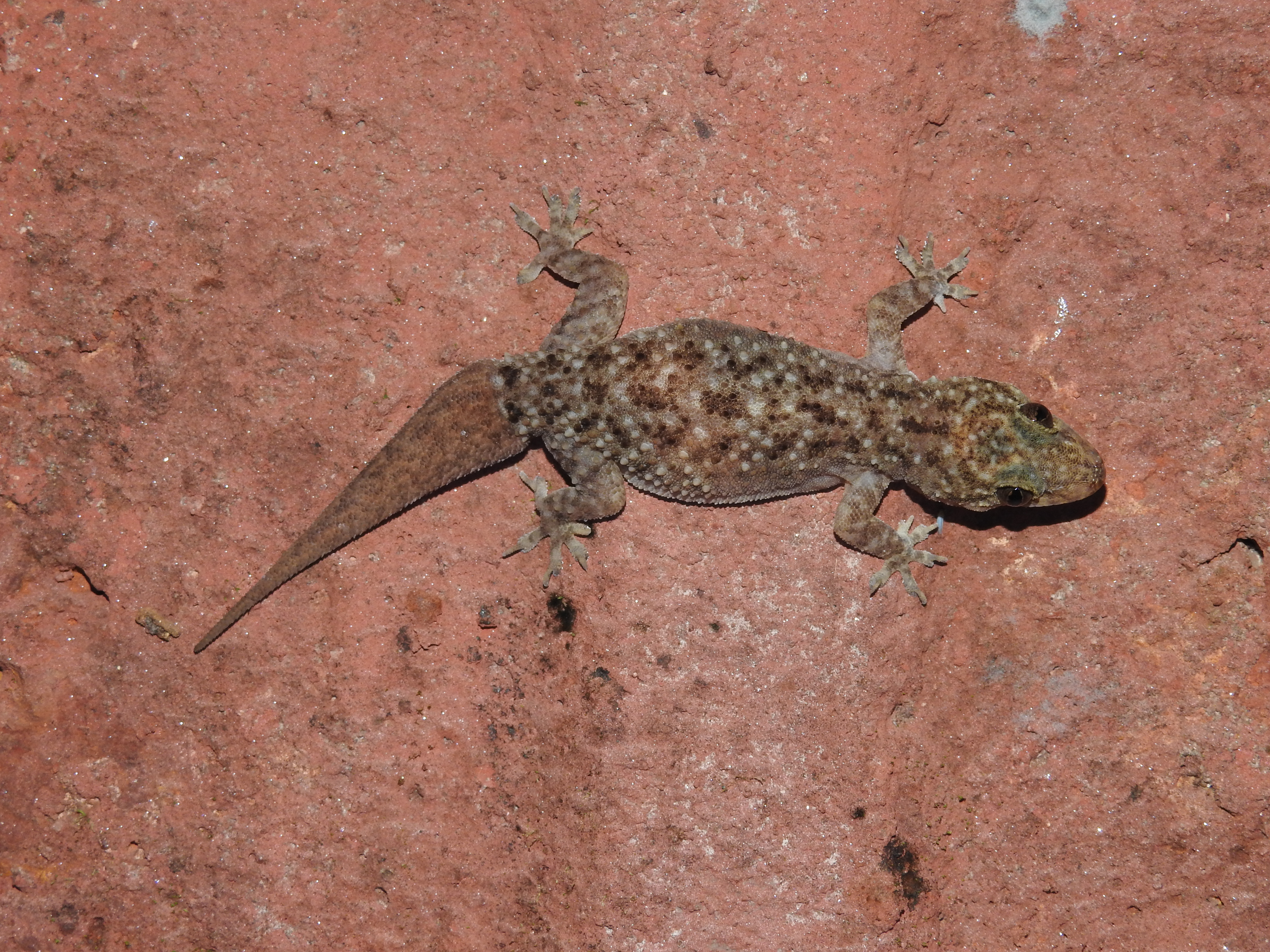
H. varadgirii

- Hemidactylus aaronbaueri Giri, 2008 – Aaron Bauer's house gecko
- Hemidactylus acanthopholis Mirza & Sanap, 2014
- Hemidactylus achaemenidicus Torki, 2019
- Hemidactylus adensis Šmíd et al., 2014
- Hemidactylus aemulus Kumar, A. Srinivasulu & C. Srinivasulu, 2022
- Hemidactylus afarensis Šmíd et al., 2020 – Afar gecko
- Hemidactylus agrius Vanzolini, 1978 – country leaf-toed gecko
- Hemidactylus albituberculatus J.-F. Trape, 2012
- Hemidactylus albivertebralis J.-F. Trape & Böhme, 2012
- Hemidactylus albofasciatus Grandison & Soman, 1963 – white-striped viper gecko
- Hemidactylus albopunctatus Loveridge, 1947 – white-spotted gecko, white-spotted leaf-toed gecko
- Hemidactylus alfarraji Šmid, Shobrak, Wilms, Joger & Carranza, 2016
- Hemidactylus alkiyumii Carranza & Arnold, 2012
- Hemidactylus almakhwah Šmíd, Uvizl, Shobrak, Busais, Salim, R. Algethami, A. Algethami, Alanazi, Alsubaie, Rovatsos, Nováková, Mazuch & Carranza, 2022
- Hemidactylus angulatus Hallowell, 1854
- Hemidactylus ansorgii Boulenger, 1901 – Nigerian leaf-toed gecko
- Hemidactylus aporus Boulenger, 1906 – Annobon leaf-toed gecko
- Hemidactylus aquilonius McMahan & Zug, 2007
- Hemidactylus arnoldi Lanza, 1978 – Arnold's leaf-toed gecko
- Hemidactylus asirensis Šmid, Shobrak, Wilms, Joger & Carranza, 2016
- Hemidactylus awashensis Šmíd et al., 2014
- Hemidactylus barbierii Sindaco, Razzetti & Ziliani, 2007
- Hemidactylus barbouri Loveridge, 1942 – Barbour’s leaf-toed gecko
- Hemidactylus barodanus Boulenger, 1901 – enigmatic gecko
- Hemidactylus bavazzanoi Lanza, 1978 – Somali banded gecko, Bavazzano’s gecko
- Hemidactylus bayonii Bocage, 1893 – Barboza's leaf-toed gecko
- Hemidactylus benguellensis Bocage, 1893 – Benguela house gecko
- Hemidactylus beninensis Bauer, Tchibozo, Pauwels & Lenglet, 2006
- Hemidactylus biokoensis Wagner, Leaché & Fujita, 2014 – Bioko leaf-toed gecko
- Hemidactylus boavistensis Boulenger, 1906 – Boa Vista leaf-toed gecko
- Hemidactylus bouvieri (Bocourt, 1870) – Bouvier's leaf-toed gecko, Cape Verde leaf-toed gecko
- Hemidactylus bowringii (Gray, 1845) – Oriental leaf-toed gecko, Bowring's gecko, Sikkimese dark-spotted gecko, Asian smooth gecko
- Hemidactylus brasilianus Amaral, 1935 – Amaral's Brazilian gecko
- Hemidactylus brookii Gray, 1845 – Brooke's house gecko, spotted house gecko
- Hemidactylus carivoensis Lobón-Rovira, Conradie, Iglesias, R. Ernst, L. Veríssimo, Baptista & Pinto, 2021
- Hemidactylus chikhaldaraensis Agarwal, Bauer, Giri & Khandekar, 2019 – Chikhaldara brookiish gecko
- Hemidactylus chipkali Mirza & Raju, 2017 – Central Indian leaf-toed gecko
- Hemidactylus cinganji Lobón-Rovira, Conradie, Iglesias, R. Ernst, L. Veríssimo, Baptista & Pinto, 2021
- Hemidactylus citernii Boulenger, 1912 – speedy leaf-toed gecko
- Hemidactylus coalescens Wagner, Leaché & Fujita, 2014
- Hemidactylus craspedotus Mocquard, 1890 – Mocquard's house gecko, frilled gecko, frilled house gecko
- Hemidactylus curlei Parker, 1942 – Parker's gecko, northern leaf-toed gecko
- Hemidactylus dawudazraqi Moravec, Kratochvíl, Amr, Jandzik, Šmíd & Gvoždík, 2011
- Hemidactylus depressus Gray, 1842 – Sri Lankan leaf-nosed gecko, Kandyan gecko
- Hemidactylus dracaenacolus Rösler & Wranik, 1999
- Hemidactylus easai S. Das, Pal, Siddharth, Palot, Deepak & Narayanan, 2022
- Hemidactylus echinus O'Shaughnessy, 1875 – hedgehog leaf-toed gecko
- Hemidactylus endophis Carranza & Arnold, 2012
- Hemidactylus eniangii Wagner, Leaché & Fujita, 2014
- Hemidactylus farasani Šmíd, Uvizl, Shobrak, Busais, Salim, R. Algethami, A. Algethami, Alanazi, Alsubaie, Rovatsos, Nováková, Mazuch & Carranza, 2022 – Farasan gecko
- Hemidactylus fasciatus Gray, 1842 – banded leaf-toed gecko
- Hemidactylus faustus Lobón-Rovira, Conradie, Iglesias, R. Ernst, L. Veríssimo, Baptista & Pinto, 2021
- Hemidactylus festivus Carranza & Arnold, 2012
- Hemidactylus flavicauda Lajmi, Giri, Singh & Agarwal, 2020 – Mahabubnagar yellow-tailed brookiish gecko
- Hemidactylus flaviviridis Rüppell, 1835 – yellow-bellied gecko, northern house gecko
- Hemidactylus forbesii Boulenger, 1899 – Socotra leaf-toed gecko
- Hemidactylus foudaii S. Baha El Din, 2003
- Hemidactylus fragilis Calabresi, 1915
- Hemidactylus frenatus Schlegel, 1836 – common house gecko, Asian house gecko, Pacific house gecko
- Hemidactylus funaiolii Lanza, 1978 – Archer's post gecko, Kenya leaf-toed gecko
- Hemidactylus garnotii A.M.C. Duméril & Bibron, 1836 – Indo-Pacific gecko, Garnot's house gecko, fox gecko, Assam greyish-brown gecko
- Hemidactylus giganteus Stoliczka, 1871 – giant leaf-toed gecko, giant southern tree gecko, giant gecko
- Hemidactylus gleadowi Murray, 1884 – Gleadow's house gecko
- Hemidactylus gracilis Blanford, 1870 – graceful leaf-toed gecko
- Hemidactylus gramineus Ceríaco, Bauer, Kusamba, Agarwal & Greenbaum, 2021
- Hemidactylus granchii Lanza, 1978 – Granchi's leaf-toed gecko
- Hemidactylus graniticolus Agarwal, Giri & Bauer, 2011
- Hemidactylus granosus Heyden, 1827
- Hemidactylus granti Boulenger, 1899 – Grant's leaf-toed gecko
- Hemidactylus greeffii Bocage, 1886 – Greeff's gecko, Greeff's giant gecko
- Hemidactylus gujaratensis Giri, Bauer, Vyas & S. Patil, 2009 – Gujarat gecko
- Hemidactylus hajarensis Carranza & Arnold, 2012
- Hemidactylus hegdei Pal & Mirza, 2022
- Hemidactylus hemchandrai Dandge & Tiple, 2015
- Hemidactylus homoeolepis Blanford, 1881 – Arabian leaf-toed gecko
- Hemidactylus hunae Deraniyagala, 1937 – spotted giant gecko
- Hemidactylus imbricatus Bauer et al., 2008 – carrot-tailed viper gecko
- Hemidactylus inexpectatus Carranza & Arnold, 2012
- Hemidactylus inintellectus Sindaco, Ziliani, Razzetti, Pupin, Grieco, 2009 – Socotran rock gecko
- Hemidactylus isolepis Boulenger, 1895 – scaly leaf-toed gecko, uniform-scaled gecko
- Hemidactylus ituriensis Schmidt, 1919 – Ituri leaf-toed gecko
- Hemidactylus jubensis Boulenger, 1895 – Ethiopian gecko, Mrioen leaf-toed gecko
- Hemidactylus jumailiae Busais & Joger, 2011
- Hemidactylus kamdemtohami Bauer & Pauwels, 2002 – Kamdem Toham's gecko
- Hemidactylus kangerensis Mirza, Bhosale & R. Patil, 2017
- Hemidactylus karenorum (Theobald, 1868) – Burmese spotted gecko, Burmese leaf-toed gecko
- Hemidactylus kimbulae Amarasinghe, Karunarathna, P. Campbell, Madawala & de Silva, 2021
- Hemidactylus klauberi Scortecci, 1948
- Hemidactylus kolliensis Agarwal, Bauer, Giri & Khandekar, 2019 – Kolli rock gecko
- Hemidactylus kundaensis Chirio & J.-F. Trape, 2012
- Hemidactylus kushmorensis Murray, 1884 – Kushmore house gecko
- Hemidactylus kyaboboensis Wagner, Leaché & Fujita, 2014
- Hemidactylus laevis Boulenger, 1901 – common leaf-toed gecko
- Hemidactylus lamaensis Ullenbruch, Grell & Böhme, 2010
- Hemidactylus lankae Deraniyagala, 1953 – termite hill gecko, Sri Lankan leaf-toed gecko
- Hemidactylus lanzai Šmíd et al., 2020
- Hemidactylus laticaudatus L.G. Andersson, 1910 – Andersson's leaf-toed gecko
- Hemidactylus lavadeserticus Moravec & Bohme, 1997 – Syrian house gecko
- Hemidactylus lemurinus Arnold, 1980 – Dhofar leaf-toed gecko, Oman ghost leaf-toed gecko
- Hemidactylus leschenaultii A.M.C. Duméril & Bibron, 1836 – Leschenault's leaf-toed gecko
- Hemidactylus longicephalus Bocage, 1873
- Hemidactylus lopezjuradoi Arnold, Vasconcelos, Harris, Mateo & Carranza, 2008 (formerly in H. bouvieri)
- Hemidactylus luqueorum Carranza & Arnold, 2012
- Hemidactylus mabouia (Moreau de Jonnès, 1818) – tropical house gecko, Afro-American house gecko, cosmopolitan house gecko
- Hemidactylus macropholis Boulenger, 1896 – Boulenger’s gecko, large-scaled leaf-toed gecko
- Hemidactylus maculatus A.M.C. Duméril & Bibron, 1836 – spotted leaf-toed gecko, giant spotted gecko
- Hemidactylus mahonyi Adhikari, Achyuthan, Kumar, Khot, Shreeram & Ganesh, 2022
- Hemidactylus makolowodei Bauer, LeBreton, Chirio, Ineich & Talla Kouete, 2006
- Hemidactylus malcolmsmithi (Constable, 1949) – Malcolm's bow-fingered gecko, Smith's bent-toed gecko
- Hemidactylus mandebensis Šmíd et al., 2014
- Hemidactylus masirahensis Carranza & Arnold, 2012
- Hemidactylus matschiei (Tornier, 1901) – Togo leaf-toed gecko
- Hemidactylus megalops Parker, 1932 – Parker's leaf-toed gecko
- Hemidactylus mercatorius Gray, 1842
- Hemidactylus mindiae S. Baha El Din, 2005 – Mount Sinai gecko
- Hemidactylus minutus Vasconcelos & Carranza, 2014
- Hemidactylus modestus (Günther, 1894) – moderate leaf-toed gecko, Tana River gecko
- Hemidactylus montanus Busais & Joger, 2011 – mountain leaf-toed gecko
- Hemidactylus mrimaensis Malonza & Bauer, 2014 – Kaya gecko
- Hemidactylus muriceus W. Peters, 1870 – Guinea leaf-toed gecko
- Hemidactylus murrayi Gleadow, 1887 – Murray's house gecko
- Hemidactylus multisulcatus – Madurai rock gecko
- Hemidactylus newtoni Ferreira, 1897 – Newton's leaf-toed gecko
- Hemidactylus nicolauensis Vasconcelos, G. Köhler, Geniez & Crochet, 2020
- Hemidactylus nzingae Ceríaco et al., 2020 – Queen Nzinga’s tropical gecko
- Hemidactylus ophiolepis Boulenger, 1903 – snake-scaled leaf-toed gecko
- Hemidactylus ophiolepoides Lanza, 1978 – Lanza's leaf-toed gecko
- Hemidactylus oxyrhinus Boulenger, 1899 – sharp-nosed leaf-toed gecko
- Hemidactylus paaragowli Srikanthan, Swamy, Mohan & Pal, 2018 – Travancore rock gecko
- Hemidactylus paivae Ceríaco et al., 2020 – Paiva’s gecko
- Hemidactylus pakkamalaiensis Narayanan, Christopher, Raman, Mukherjee, Prabhu, Lenin, Vimalraj & Deepak, 2023
- Hemidactylus palaichthus Kluge, 1969 – Antilles leaf-toed gecko
- Hemidactylus parvimaculatus Deraniyagala, 1953 – spotted house gecko
- Hemidactylus paucifasciatus Mohapatra, Agarwal, Mohalik, Dutta & Khandekar, 2023
- Hemidactylus pauciporosus Lanza, 1978
- Hemidactylus paucituberculatus Carranza & Arnold, 2012
- Hemidactylus persicus J. Anderson, 1872 – Persian leaf-toed gecko, Persian gecko
- Hemidactylus pfindaensis Lobón-Rovira, Conradie, Iglesias, R. Ernst, L. Veríssimo, Baptista & Pinto, 2021
- Hemidactylus pieresii Kelaart, 1852
- Hemidactylus platycephalus W. Peters, 1854 – tree gecko, flat-headed leaf-toed gecko, baobab gecko
- Hemidactylus platyurus (Schneider, 1792) – flat-tailed house gecko, frilled house gecko, Asian house gecko
- Hemidactylus porbandarensis Sharma, 1981
- Hemidactylus prashadi M.A. Smith, 1935 – Bombay leaf-toed gecko, Prashad's gecko
- Hemidactylus principensis Miller, Sellas & Drewes, 2012
- Hemidactylus pseudomuriceus Henle & Böhme, 2003
- Hemidactylus pseudoromeshkanicus Torki, 2019
- Hemidactylus puccionii Calabresi, 1927 – Zanzibar leaf-toed gecko, Somali plain gecko
- Hemidactylus pumilio Boulenger, 1899 – pygmy leaf-toed gecko
- Hemidactylus quartziticolus Khandekar, Thackeray, Mariappan, Gangalmale, Waghe, Pawar & Agarwal, 2023
- Hemidactylus raya Kumar, A. Srinivasulu & C. Srinivasulu, 2022
- Hemidactylus reticulatus Beddome, 1870 – reticulated leaf-toed gecko
- Hemidactylus richardsonii Gray, 1845 – Richardson's leaf-toed gecko
- Hemidactylus rishivalleyensis Agarwal, Thackeray & Khandekar, 2020 – Rishi Valley rock gecko
- Hemidactylus robustus Heyden, 1827 – Heyden's gecko
- Hemidactylus romeshkanicus Torki, 2011
- Hemidactylus ruspolii Boulenger, 1896 – farm leaf-toed gecko, Ruspoli's gecko, turnip-tailed black and yellow gecko
- Hemidactylus saba Busais & Joger, 2011
- Hemidactylus sahgali Mirza, Gowande, R. Patil, Ambekar & Patel, 2018 – Sahgal’s termite hill gecko
- Hemidactylus sankariensis Agarwal, Bauer, Giri & Khandekar, 2019 – Sankari brookiish gecko
- Hemidactylus sassanidianus Torki, 2019
- Hemidactylus sataraensis Giri & Bauer, 2008 – Satara gecko
- Hemidactylus saxicolus Kumar, A. Srinivasulu & C. Srinivasulu, 2022
- Hemidactylus scabriceps (Annandale, 1906) – scaly gecko
- Hemidactylus shihraensis Busais & Joger, 2011
- Hemidactylus sinaitus Boulenger, 1885 – Red Sea gecko, Sinai leaf-toed gecko
- Hemidactylus sirumalaiensis Khandekar, Thackeray, Pawar & Agarwal, 2020
- Hemidactylus siva C. Srinivasulu, A. Srinivasulu & Kumar, 2018 – Hampi rock gecko
- Hemidactylus smithi Boulenger, 1895 – Smith's leaf-toed gecko
- Hemidactylus somalicus Parker, 1932 – Northern Somali leaf-toed gecko
- Hemidactylus squamulatus Tornier, 1896 – Tornier's leaf-toed gecko, Nyika gecko
- Hemidactylus srikanthani Adhikari, Achyuthan, Kumar, Khot, Shreeram & Ganesh, 2022
- Hemidactylus stejnegeri Ota & Hikida, 1989 – Stejneger's leaf-toed gecko
- Hemidactylus subtriedrus Jerdon, 1854 – Jerdon's gecko, Madras blotched gecko
- Hemidactylus sushilduttai Giri, Bauer, Mohapatra, C. Srinivasulu & Agarwal, 2017 – Dutta Mahendragiri gecko
- Hemidactylus tamhiniensis Khandekar, Thackeray & Agarwal, 2021 – Tamhini giant rock gecko, basalt giant rock gecko
- Hemidactylus tanganicus Loveridge, 1929 – Tanzanian leaf-toed gecko, Tanzanian diamond gecko, Dutumi gecko
- Hemidactylus tasmani Hewitt, 1932 – Tasmanian leaf-toed gecko
- Hemidactylus taylori Parker, 1932
- Hemidactylus tenkatei Lidth de Jeude, 1895
- Hemidactylus thayene McMahan & Zug, 2007
- Hemidactylus treutleri Mahony, 2009 – Treutler's gecko
- Hemidactylus triedrus (Daudin, 1802) – termite hill gecko, Dakota's leaf-toed gecko, blotched house gecko
- Hemidactylus tropidolepis Mocquard, 1888 – Mocquard's leaf-toed gecko, Ogaden gecko
- Hemidactylus turcicus Linnaeus, 1758 – Mediterranean house gecko, Turkish gecko
- Hemidactylus ulii Šmíd, Moravec, Kratochvil, Gvozdik, Nasher, Busais, Wilms, Shobrak & Carranza, 2013
- Hemidactylus vanam Chaitanya, Lajmi & Giri, 2018 – Megamalai rock gecko
- Hemidactylus varadgirii Chaitanya, Agarwal, Lajmi & Khandekar, 2019 – Giri’s brookiish gecko, Amboli brookiish gecko
- Hemidactylus vernayi Ceríaco, Agarwal, Marques & Bauer, 2020 – Vernay’s tropical gecko
- Hemidactylus vietnamensis Darevsky, Kupriyanova & Roshchin, 1984 – Vietnam leaf-toed gecko, Vietnam house gecko
- Hemidactylus vijayraghavani Mirza, 2018
- Hemidactylus whitakeri Mirza, Gowande, R. Patil, Ambekar & Patel, 2018 – Whitaker’s termite hill gecko
- Hemidactylus xericolus Lajmi, Giri, Singh & Agarwal, 2020 – Nalgonda yellow-tailed brookiish gecko
- Hemidactylus yajurvedi Murthy, Bauer, Lajmi, Agarwal & Giri, 2015 – Kanker rock gecko
- Hemidactylus yerburyi J. Anderson, 1895 – Yerbury’s gecko, Yerburi’s leaf-toed gecko
- Hemidactylus aravalliensis Patel, TEJAS THACKERAY, RAJU VYAS & Mirza, 2026
- Hemidactylus kalinga Mohapatra, Ray, Das, Bhupathi, Sarkar, Mohalik, Nair & Dutta, 2025
- Hemidactylus amarasinghei Sayyed, Khot & Purkayastha, 2025
- Hemidactylus gubanensis Mazuch, Janák, Velenská, Nistri, Elmi & Šmíd, 2024
- Hemidactylus huluul Mazuch, Janák, Velenská, Nistri, Elmi & Šmíd, 2024

== Phylogeny ==
The following phylogeny is from Pyron, et al. (2013), and includes 47 Hemidactylus species. Hemidactylus is a sister group of Cyrtodactylus.

- Hemidactylus
  - - Hemidactylus bowringii
    - - Hemidactylus garnotii
      - - Hemidactylus karenorum
        - Hemidactylus platyurus
  - - - - Hemidactylus fasciatus
        - - - - Hemidactylus aaronbaueri
              - Hemidactylus giganteus
            - - Hemidactylus depressus
              - - Hemidactylus triedrus
                - - Hemidactylus prashadi
                  - Hemidactylus maculatus
          - - - Hemidactylus leschenaultii
              - Hemidactylus flaviviridis
            - - Hemidactylus frenatus
              - - Hemidactylus brookii
                - - Hemidactylus sataraensis
                  - - Hemidactylus imbricatus
                    - - Hemidactylus albofasciatus
                      - - Hemidactylus reticulatus
                        - Hemidactylus gracilis
    - - - - Hemidactylus angulatus
          - Hemidactylus haitianus
        - - - Hemidactylus mabouia
            - Hemidactylus mercatorius
          - - - Hemidactylus longicephalus
              - Hemidactylus platycephalus
            - - - Hemidactylus greeffii
                - Hemidactylus brasilianus
              - - Hemidactylus bouvieri
                - - Hemidactylus palaichthus
                  - Hemidactylus agrius
      - - - Hemidactylus modestus
          - - Hemidactylus citernii
            - Hemidactylus foudaii
        - - - Hemidactylus pumilio
            - - Hemidactylus dracaenacolus
              - Hemidactylus granti
          - - Hemidactylus persicus
            - - - Hemidactylus yerburii
                - Hemidactylus robustus
              - - - Hemidactylus turcicus
                  - - Hemidactylus lemurinus
                    - Hemidactylus mindiae
                - - Hemidactylus macropholis
                  - - Hemidactylus oxyrhinus
                    - - Hemidactylus forbesii
                      - Hemidactylus homoeolepis
