= Hemidactylus gramineus =

Scientific classification
- Kingdom: Animalia
- Phylum: Chordata
- Class: Reptilia
- Order: Squamata
- Suborder: Gekkota
- Family: Gekkonidae
- Genus: Hemidactylus
- Species: H. gramineus

Binomial name
- Hemidactylus gramineus Ceríaco, Bauer, Kusamba, Agarwal, & Greenbaum, 2021
- Hemidactylus gramineus is only known from Bombo-Lumene Reserve, the Democratic Republic of Congo

Species of lizard

Hemidactylus gramineus is a species of gecko. It is endemic to the Democratic Republic of Congo where it is known from its type locality, Bombo-Lumene Reserve (Kinshasa Province).

Hemidactylus gramineus can grow to 40 mm (1.6 in) in snout–vent length.
