= Hemidactylus bavazzanoi =

Conservation status
- Data Deficient (IUCN 3.1)

Scientific classification
- Kingdom: Animalia
- Phylum: Chordata
- Class: Reptilia
- Order: Squamata
- Suborder: Gekkota
- Family: Gekkonidae
- Genus: Hemidactylus
- Species: H. bavazzanoi

Binomial name
- Hemidactylus bavazzanoi Lanza, 1978

Species of lizard

Hemidactylus bavazzanoi, also known commonly as Bavazzano's gecko, the Somali banded gecko, and the Somali leaf-toed gecko, is a species of lizard in the family Gekkonidae. The species is native to eastern Africa.

== Etymology ==
The specific name, bavazzanoi, is in honor of Italian botanist Renato Bavazzano.

== Geographic range ==
H. bavazzanoi is found in southern Ethiopia, northeastern Kenya, and southern Somalia.

== Habitat ==
The preferred natural habitat of H. bavazzanoi is shrubland.

== Description ==
Medium-sized for its genus, H. bavazzanoi may attain a snout-to-vent length (SVL) of 4 cm (1.6 in). Dorsally, it is pink with four black crossbands, a crescentic one on the neck, two on the body, and one on the base of the tail.

== Reproduction ==
H. bavazzanoi is oviparous.
