= Enigmatic gecko =

Scientific classification
- Kingdom: Animalia
- Phylum: Chordata
- Class: Reptilia
- Order: Squamata
- Suborder: Gekkota
- Family: Gekkonidae
- Genus: Hemidactylus
- Species: H. barodanus

Binomial name
- Hemidactylus barodanus Boulenger, 1901

Species of reptile

The enigmatic gecko (Hemidactylus barodanus) is a species of gecko. It is found in Ethiopia and Somalia.
