= Hemidactylus paucifasciatus =

Scientific classification
- Kingdom: Animalia
- Phylum: Chordata
- Class: Reptilia
- Order: Squamata
- Suborder: Gekkota
- Family: Gekkonidae
- Genus: Hemidactylus
- Species: H. paucifasciatus

Binomial name
- Hemidactylus paucifasciatus Mohapatra, Agarwal, Mohalik, Dutta & Khandekar, 2023

Species of common Gecko

Hemidactylus paucifasciatus is a species of gecko from the genus Hemidactylus. It is distributed throughout the region of Odisha in India. It has a row of bumps along its back and a large tail. It is relatively large compared to its genus, and it has a rust color.

== Characteristics ==
The total length of the body is large relative to others in the genus, with the largest identified measuring at 117.7 mm (4.63 in). There is a row of raised bumps spread along the dorsal (back) side of the body, and typically displays a reddish-brown color. The gecko typically prefers to live in hills and valleys in the Indian countryside. It has a collection of scales on its front side ranging from 32 to 35 individual ones. The tail is large relative to the rest of the body, and their knees resemble a distinct cone-like shape.
