= Andersson's leaf-toed gecko =

Scientific classification
- Domain: Eukaryota
- Kingdom: Animalia
- Phylum: Chordata
- Class: Reptilia
- Order: Squamata
- Infraorder: Gekkota
- Family: Gekkonidae
- Genus: Hemidactylus
- Species: H. laticaudatus

Binomial name
- Hemidactylus laticaudatus Andersson, 1910

Synonyms
- Hemidactylus fossatii

Species of lizard

Andersson's leaf-toed gecko (Hemidactylus laticaudatus) is a species of gecko. It is endemic to northern Ethiopia and Eritrea.
