= Hemidactylus albopunctatus =

Scientific classification
- Domain: Eukaryota
- Kingdom: Animalia
- Phylum: Chordata
- Class: Reptilia
- Order: Squamata
- Infraorder: Gekkota
- Family: Gekkonidae
- Genus: Hemidactylus
- Species: H. albopunctatus

Binomial name
- Hemidactylus albopunctatus (Loveridge, 1947)

Synonyms
- Teratolepis taylori

Species of lizard

Hemidactylus albopunctatus, also known as the white-spotted gecko or white leaf-toed gecko, is a species of gecko. It is found in eastern Africa in Ethiopia, northern Kenya, and Somalia.
