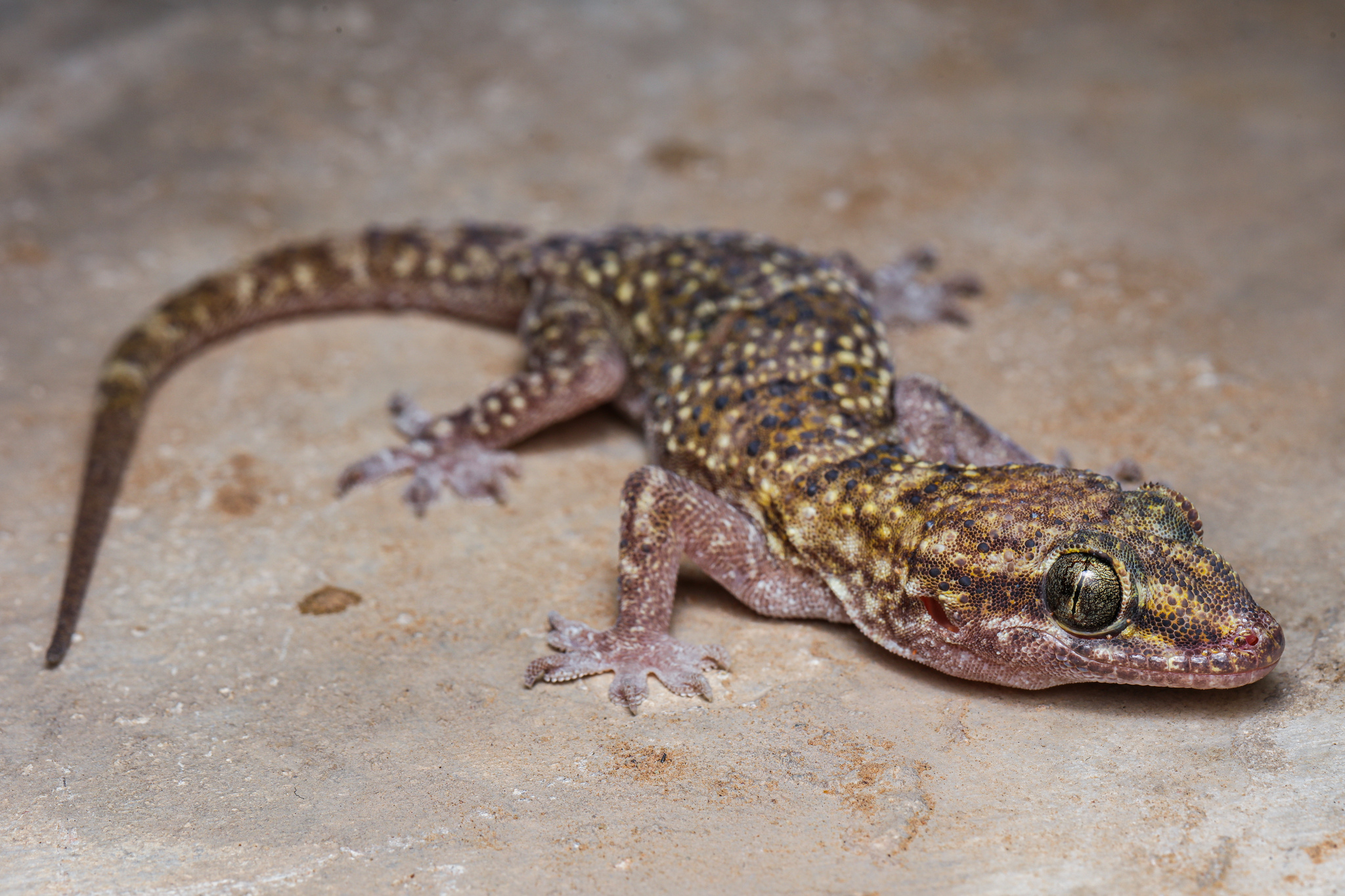
- Hemidactylus pseudoromeshkanicus

Scientific classification
- Kingdom: Animalia
- Phylum: Chordata
- Class: Reptilia
- Order: Squamata
- Suborder: Gekkota
- Family: Gekkonidae
- Genus: Hemidactylus
- Species: H. pseudoromeshkanicus

Binomial name
- Hemidactylus pseudoromeshkanicus Torki, 2019

= Hemidactylus pseudoromeshkanicus =

Species of lizard

Hemidactylus pseudoromeshkanicus is a species of gecko. It is endemic to Iran.
