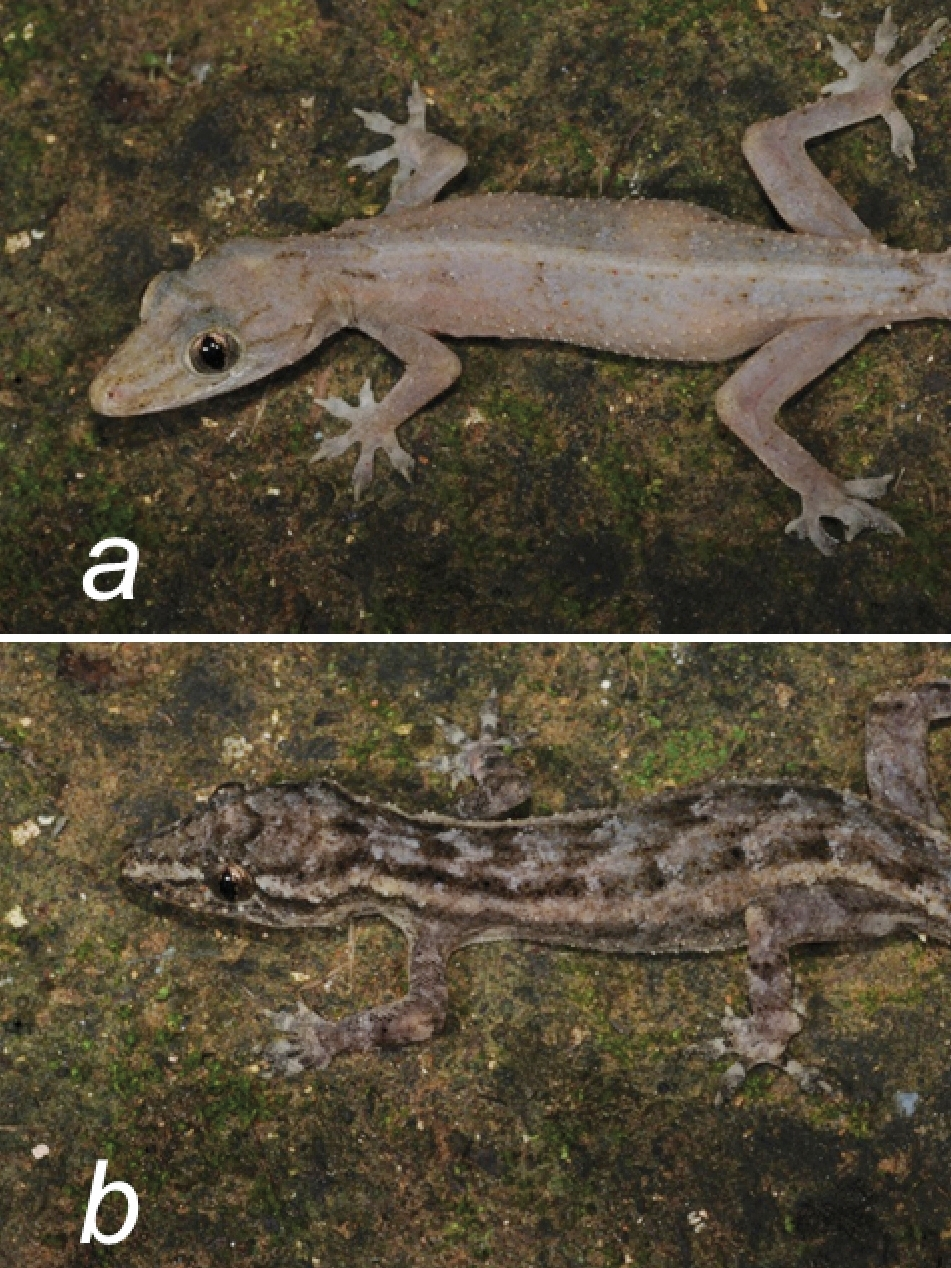
- Hemidactylus paivae from Serra do Pingano Rainforest National Park: (a) "cave-morph" from calcerous inselberg cave systems, (b) "forest-morph" from forest patch

Scientific classification
- Domain: Eukaryota
- Kingdom: Animalia
- Phylum: Chordata
- Class: Reptilia
- Order: Squamata
- Infraorder: Gekkota
- Family: Gekkonidae
- Genus: Hemidactylus
- Species: H. paivae

Binomial name
- Hemidactylus paivae Ceríaco, Agarwal, Marques, & Bauer, 2020

= Hemidactylus paivae =

Species of lizard

Hemidactylus paivae, also known as the Paiva's gecko, is a species of house gecko endemic to Angola.
