= Hemidactylus macropholis =

Scientific classification
- Domain: Eukaryota
- Kingdom: Animalia
- Phylum: Chordata
- Class: Reptilia
- Order: Squamata
- Infraorder: Gekkota
- Family: Gekkonidae
- Genus: Hemidactylus
- Species: H. macropholis

Binomial name
- Hemidactylus macropholis Boulenger, 1896

Synonyms
- Hemidactylus turcicus macropholis

Species of lizard

Hemidactylus macropholis, also known as Boulenger's gecko or largescale leaf-toed gecko, is a species of gecko. It is endemic to northeastern Africa and occurs in Somalia, northern Kenya, Ethiopia, and Eritrea,.
