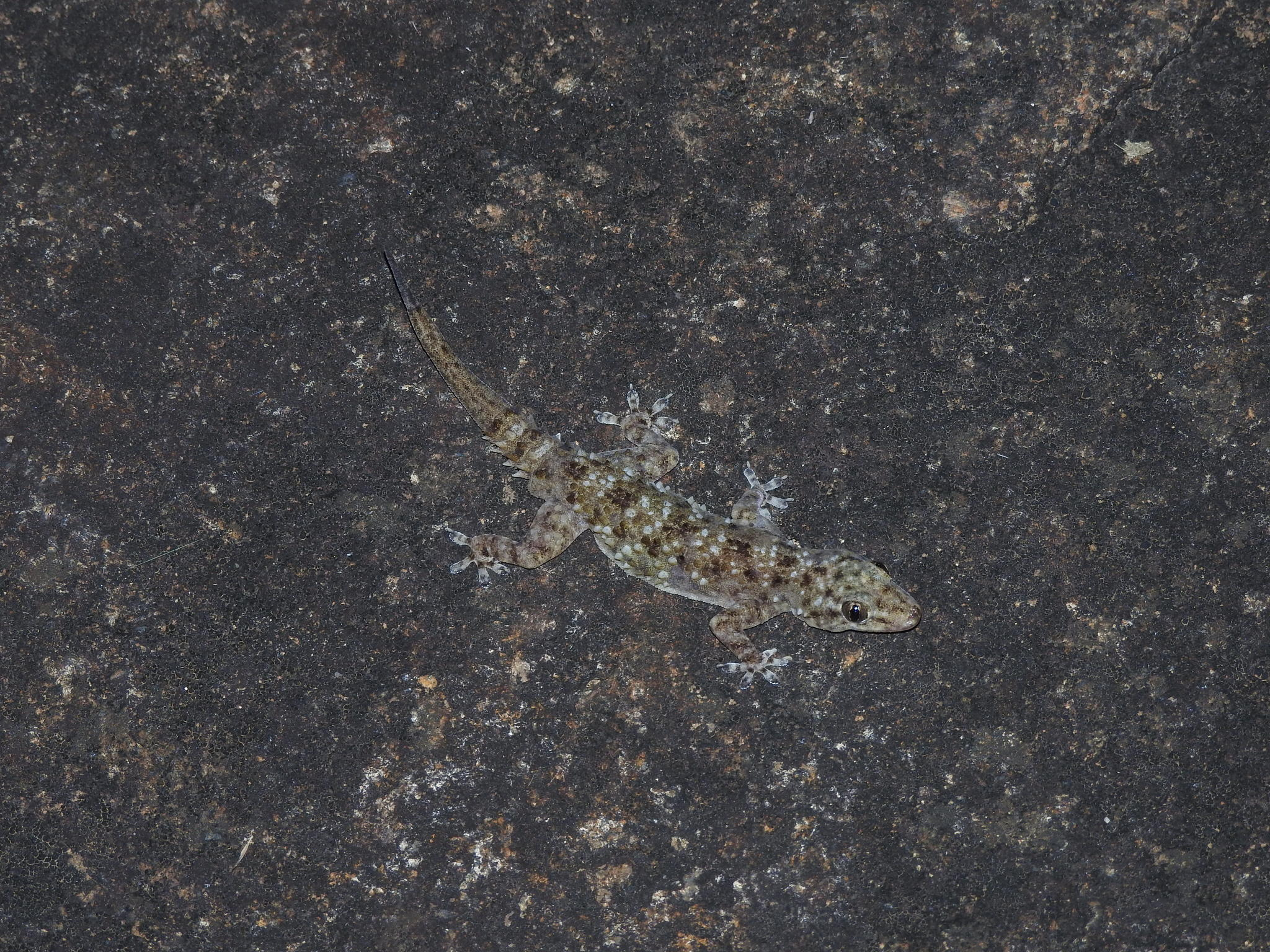

Scientific classification
- Kingdom: Animalia
- Phylum: Chordata
- Class: Reptilia
- Order: Squamata
- Suborder: Gekkota
- Family: Gekkonidae
- Genus: Hemidactylus
- Species: H. rishivalleyensis

Binomial name
- Hemidactylus rishivalleyensis Agarwal, Thackeray, & Khandekar, 2020

= Hemidactylus rishivalleyensis =

Species of lizard

Hemidactylus rishivalleyensis is a species of house gecko from India.
