= Hemidactylus sankariensis =

Scientific classification
- Kingdom: Animalia
- Phylum: Chordata
- Class: Reptilia
- Order: Squamata
- Suborder: Gekkota
- Family: Gekkonidae
- Genus: Hemidactylus
- Species: H. sankariensis

Binomial name
- Hemidactylus sankariensis Agarwal, Bauer, Giri, & Khandekar, 2019

Species of lizard

Hemidactylus sankariensis, the Sankari brookiish gecko is a species of gecko. It is endemic to India.
