= Hemidactylus taylori =

Conservation status
- Data Deficient (IUCN 3.1)

Scientific classification
- Kingdom: Animalia
- Phylum: Chordata
- Class: Reptilia
- Order: Squamata
- Suborder: Gekkota
- Family: Gekkonidae
- Genus: Hemidactylus
- Species: H. taylori

Binomial name
- Hemidactylus taylori Parker, 1932

Species of lizard

Hemidactylus taylori, also known commonly as Taylor's house gecko and Taylor's Somali half-toed gecko, is a species of lizard in the family Gekkonidae. The species is endemic to Somalia.

== Etymology ==
The specific name, taylori, is in honor of British army officer Captain R. H. R. Taylor.

== Behavior ==
H. taylori is terrestrial and nocturnal.

== Reproduction ==
H. taylori is oviparous.
