= Hemidactylus curlei =

Conservation status
- Data Deficient (IUCN 3.1)

Scientific classification
- Kingdom: Animalia
- Phylum: Chordata
- Class: Reptilia
- Order: Squamata
- Suborder: Gekkota
- Family: Gekkonidae
- Genus: Hemidactylus
- Species: H. curlei

Binomial name
- Hemidactylus curlei Parker, 1942

Species of lizard

Hemidactylus curlei, also known commonly as the northern leaf-toed gecko or Parker's gecko, is a species of lizard in the family Gekkonidae. The species is native to the Horn of Africa.

== Etymology ==
The specific name, curlei, may be in honor of amateur naturalist A.T. Curle (died 1981), who was a consular official in Ethiopia and Somaliland.

== Geographic range ==
H. curlei is found in Ethiopia and Somaliland.

== Habitat ==
The preferred natural habitat of H. curlei is rocky areas in savanna, at altitudes of 1,230–1,500 m (4,040–4,920 ft).

== Description ==
Dorsally, H. curlei is yellowish with purplish black markings. Ventrally, it is white. The holotype has a snout-to-vent length (SVL) of 4.3 cm (1.7 in).

== Reproduction ==
H. curlei is oviparous.
