= Hemidactylus tenkatei =

Scientific classification
- Kingdom: Animalia
- Phylum: Chordata
- Class: Reptilia
- Order: Squamata
- Suborder: Gekkota
- Family: Gekkonidae
- Genus: Hemidactylus
- Species: H. tenkatei

Binomial name
- Hemidactylus tenkatei Lidth de Jeude, 1895

Synonyms
- Hemidactylus brookii subtriedroides

Species of lizard

Hemidactylus tenkatei is a species of gecko. It is found in Indonesia and Timor-Leste.
