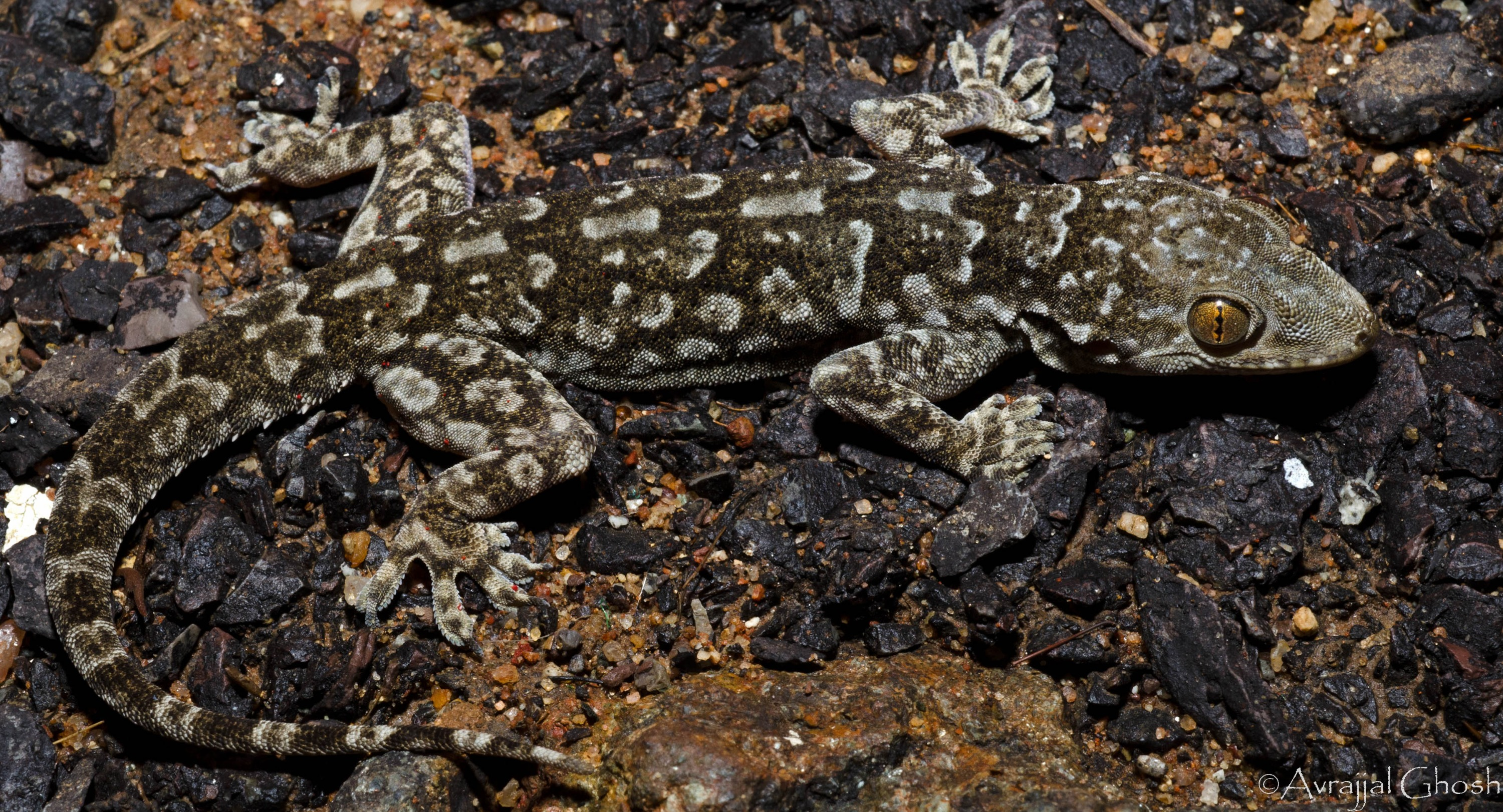

Conservation status
- Endangered (IUCN 3.1)

Scientific classification
- Kingdom: Animalia
- Phylum: Chordata
- Order: Squamata
- Suborder: Gekkota
- Family: Gekkonidae
- Genus: Hemidactylus
- Species: H. yajurvedi

Binomial name
- Hemidactylus yajurvedi Murthy, Bauer, Lajmi, Agarwal, & Giri, 2015

Synonyms
- Hemidactylus hemidactylus yajurvedi

= Kanker rock gecko =

Species of lizard

The Kanker rock gecko (Hemidactylus yajurvedi) is a species of gecko. It is endemic to Chhattisgarh, India.
