= Speedy leaf-toed gecko =

Conservation status
- Least Concern (IUCN 3.1)

Scientific classification
- Kingdom: Animalia
- Phylum: Chordata
- Class: Reptilia
- Order: Squamata
- Suborder: Gekkota
- Family: Gekkonidae
- Genus: Hemidactylus
- Species: H. citernii

Binomial name
- Hemidactylus citernii Boulenger, 1912

Species of lizard

The speedy leaf-toed gecko (Hemidactylus citernii) is a species of lizard in the family Gekkonidae. The species is native to East Africa and the Horn of Africa.

== Etymology ==
The specific name, citernii, is in honor of Italian explorer Carlo Citerni.

== Geographic range ==
H. citernii is found in Djibouti and northwestern Somalia, and possibly also in Kenya.

== Habitat ==
H. citernii has been found in a variety of habitats, at altitudes of 50–960 m (160–3,150 ft).

== Reproduction ==
H. citernii is oviparous.
