= Hemidactylus almakhwah =

Scientific classification
- Kingdom: Animalia
- Phylum: Chordata
- Class: Reptilia
- Order: Squamata
- Suborder: Gekkota
- Family: Gekkonidae
- Genus: Hemidactylus
- Species: H. almakhwah

Binomial name
- Hemidactylus almakhwah Šmíd, Uvizl, Shobrak, Busais, Salim, Algethami, Algethami, Alanazi, Alsubaie, Rovatsos, Nováková, Mazuch, & Carranza, 2022

Species of lizard

Hemidactylus almakhwah is a species of house gecko from Saudi Arabia.
