= Socotran rock gecko =

Conservation status
- Least Concern (IUCN 3.1)

Scientific classification
- Kingdom: Animalia
- Phylum: Chordata
- Class: Reptilia
- Order: Squamata
- Suborder: Gekkota
- Family: Gekkonidae
- Genus: Hemidactylus
- Species: H. inintellectus

Binomial name
- Hemidactylus inintellectus Sindaco, Ziliani, Razzetti, Pupin, & Grieco, 2009
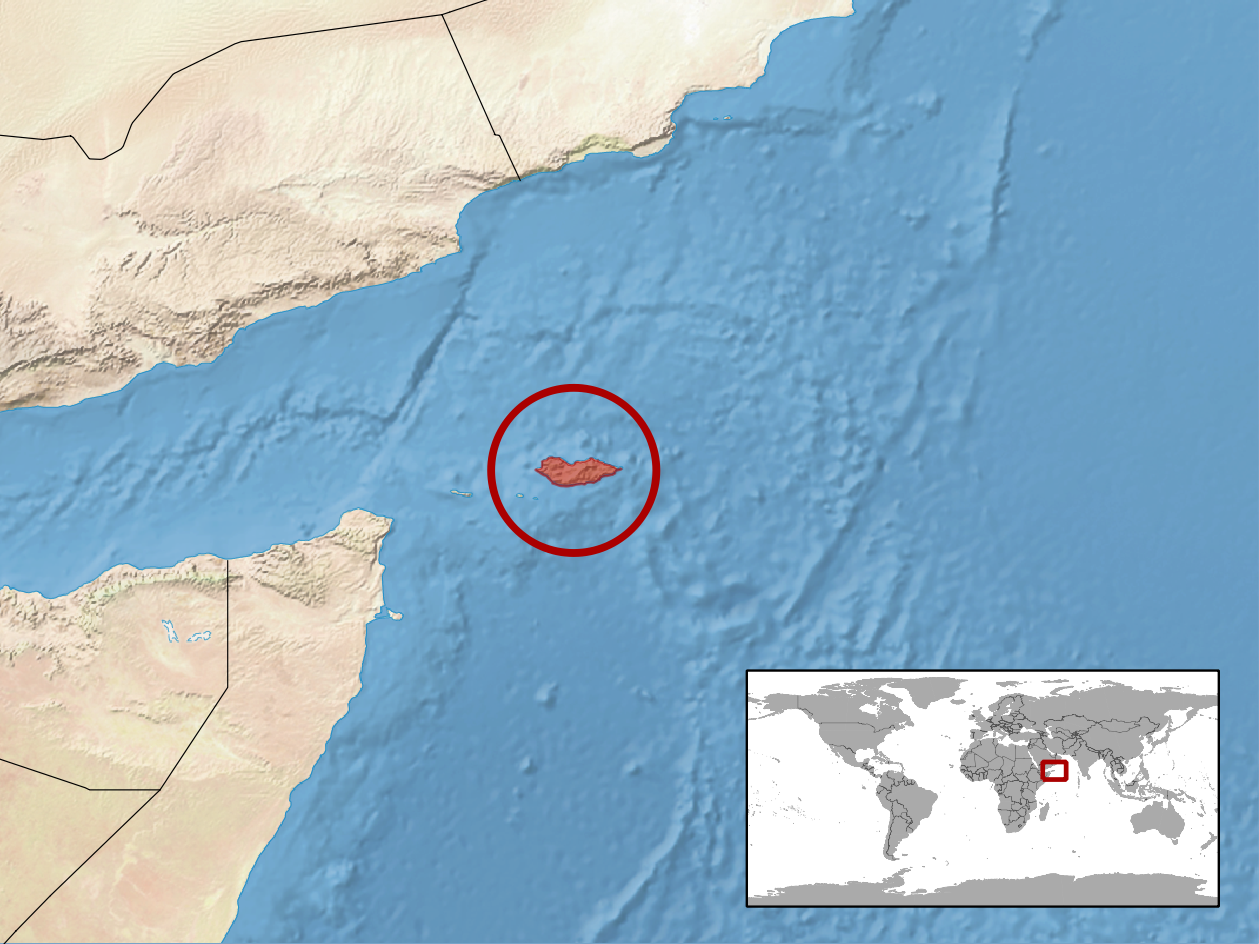

Species of lizard

The Socotran rock gecko (Hemidactylus inintellectus) is a species of gecko. It is endemic to Socotra.
