= Hemidactylus siva =

Scientific classification
- Domain: Eukaryota
- Kingdom: Animalia
- Phylum: Chordata
- Class: Reptilia
- Order: Squamata
- Infraorder: Gekkota
- Family: Gekkonidae
- Genus: Hemidactylus
- Species: H. siva

Binomial name
- Hemidactylus siva Srinivasulu, Srinivasulu, & Kumar, 2018

Species of house gecko

Hemidactylus siva, also known as the Hampi rock gecko, is a species of house gecko from India.
