= Pigmy leaf-toed gecko =

Conservation status
- Least Concern (IUCN 3.1)

Scientific classification
- Kingdom: Animalia
- Phylum: Chordata
- Class: Reptilia
- Order: Squamata
- Suborder: Gekkota
- Family: Gekkonidae
- Genus: Hemidactylus
- Species: H. pumilio

Binomial name
- Hemidactylus pumilio Boulenger, 1899
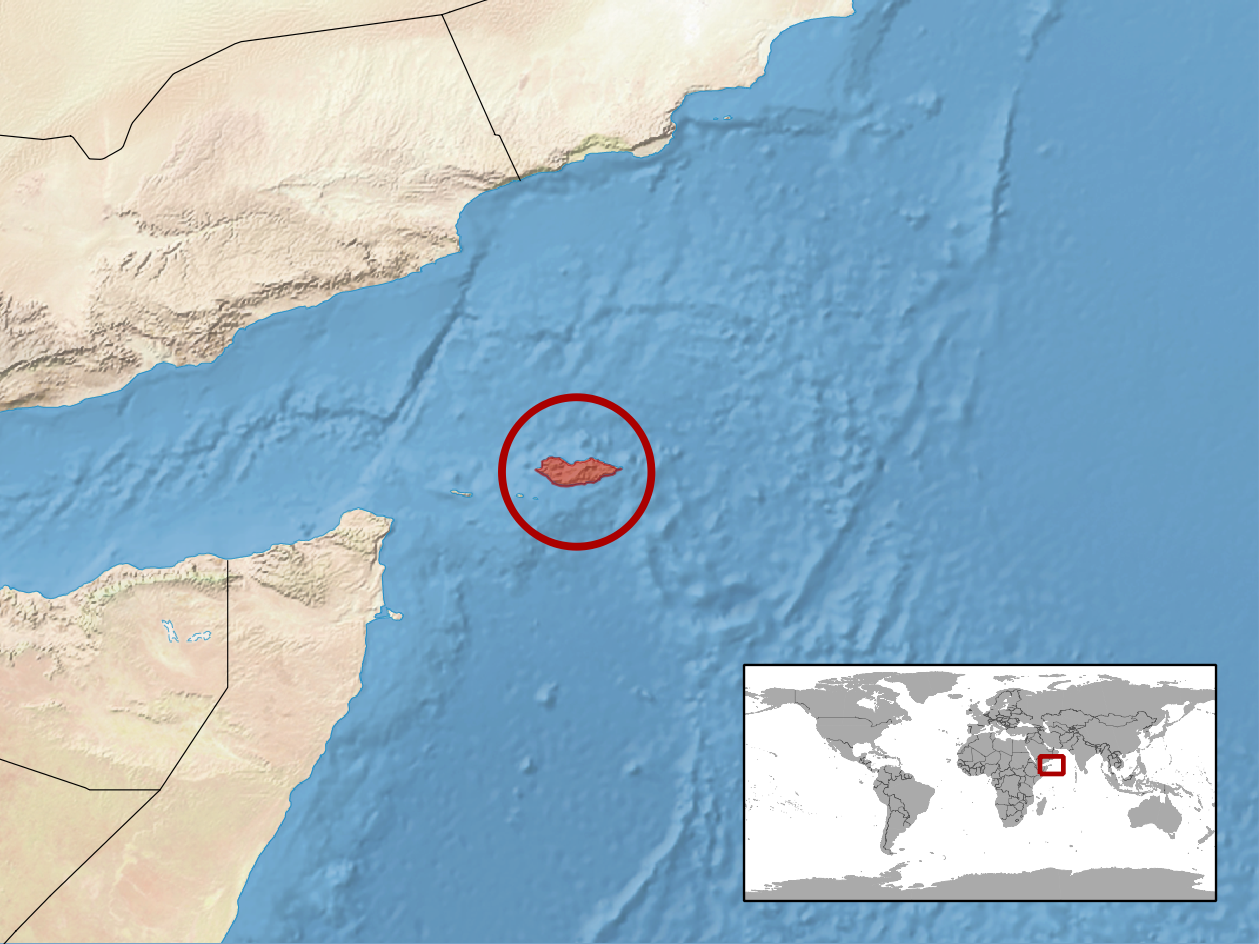

Species of lizard

The pigmy leaf-toed gecko (Hemidactylus pumilio) is a species of gecko. It is endemic to Socotra.
