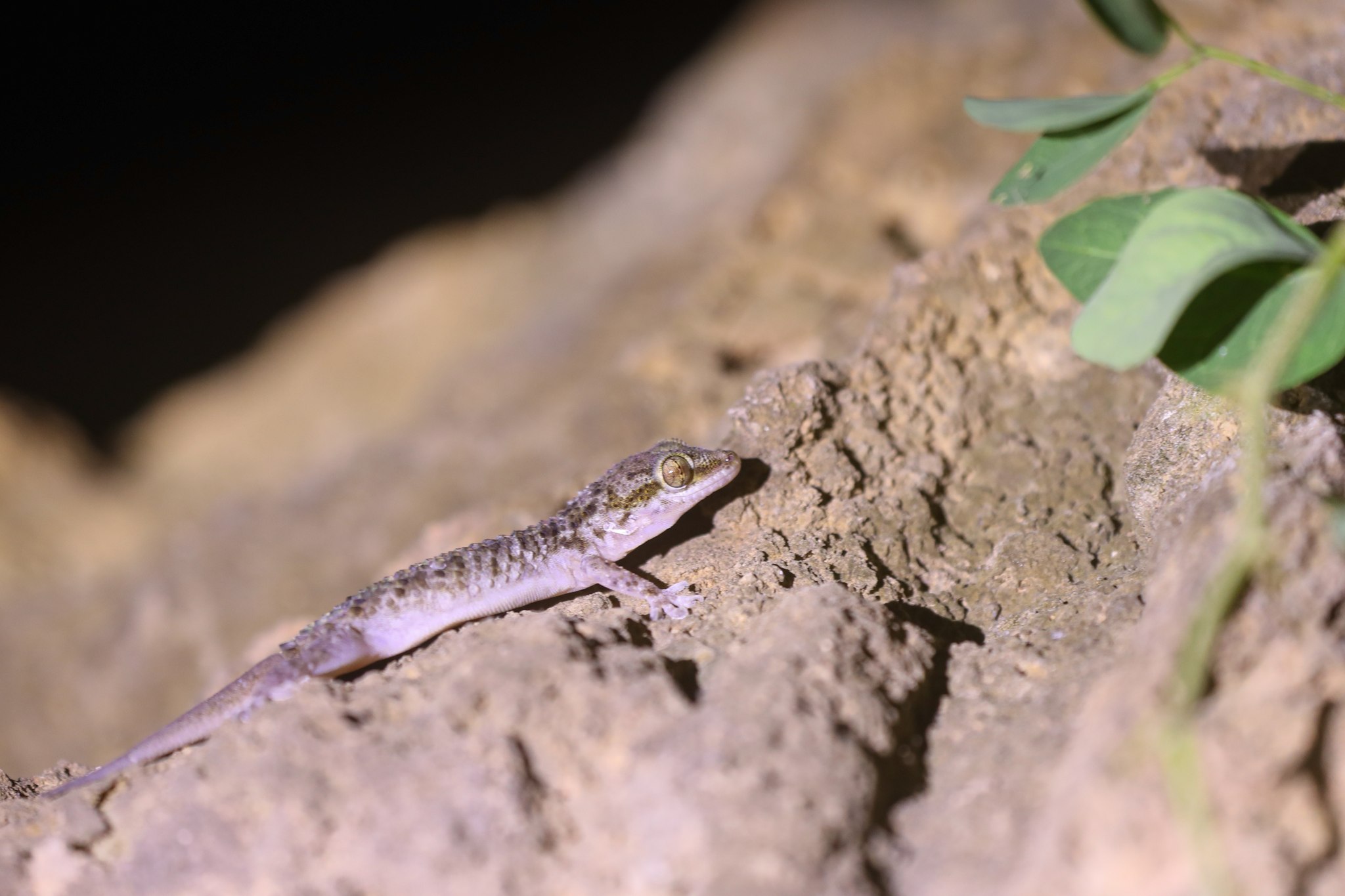

Scientific classification
- Kingdom: Animalia
- Phylum: Chordata
- Class: Reptilia
- Order: Squamata
- Suborder: Gekkota
- Family: Gekkonidae
- Genus: Hemidactylus
- Species: H. alkiyumii

Binomial name
- Hemidactylus alkiyumii Carranza & Arnold, 2012

= Hemidactylus alkiyumii =

Species of lizard

Hemidactylus alkiyumii is a species of house gecko from Oman.
