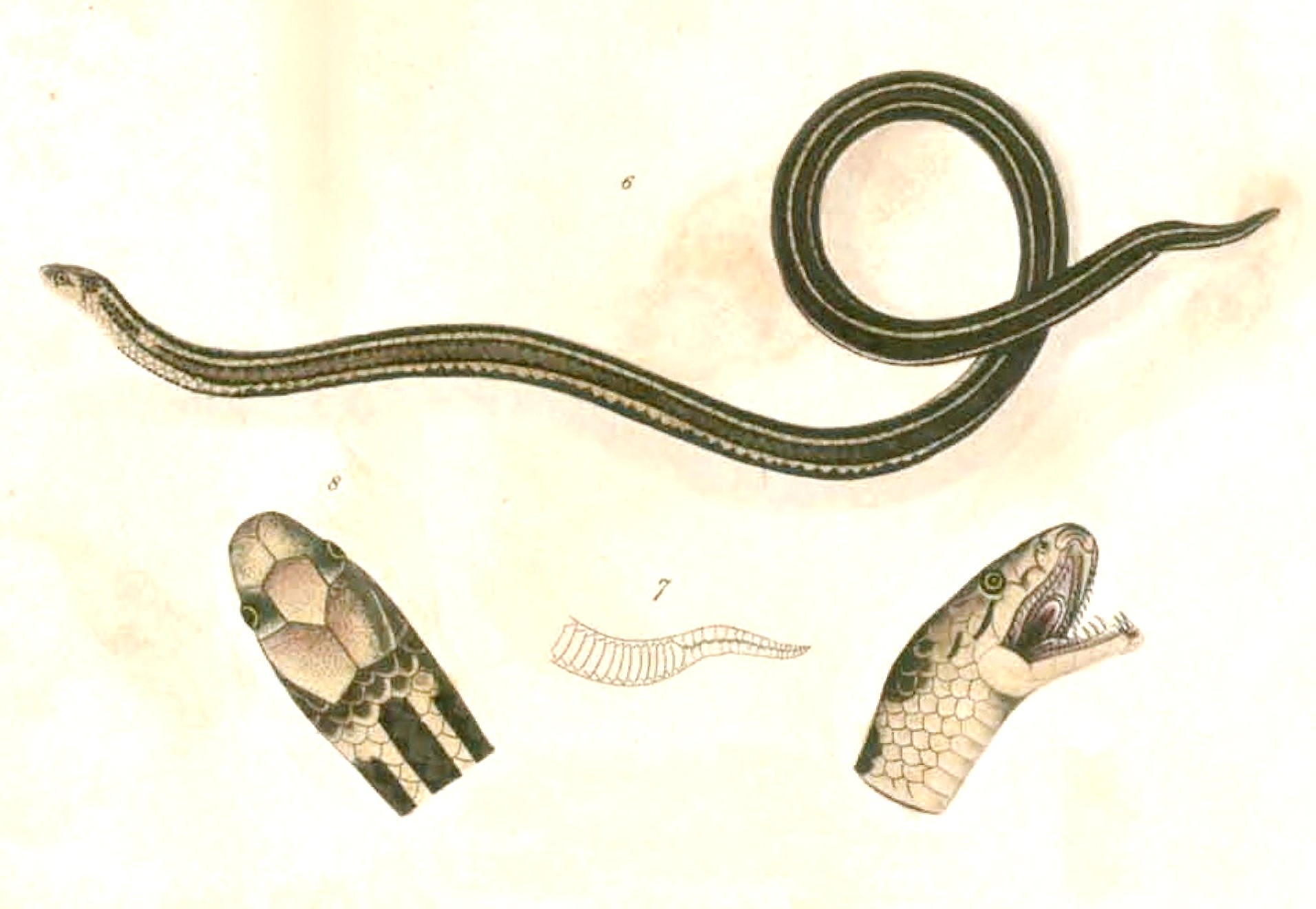
- Calamaria albiventer

Scientific classification
- Kingdom: Animalia
- Phylum: Chordata
- Class: Reptilia
- Order: Squamata
- Suborder: Serpentes
- Family: Colubridae
- Subfamily: Calamariinae
- Genus: Calamaria; F. Boie, 1827

Species
- 67 recognized species, see article.

= Calamaria =

Genus of snakes

Calamaria is a large genus of dwarf burrowing snakes of the family Colubridae. The genus contains 66 recognized species. The genus is endemic to Asia.

== Description ==
Species in the genus Calamaria share the following characteristics. The eight to 11 maxillary teeth are subequal; the anterior mandibular teeth are somewhat longer than the posterior ones. The head is not distinct from neck; the eye is small, with a round pupil; the nostril is pierced in a minute nasal scale. No loreal, internasal, or temporal scales are present; the preocular can be present or absent; the parietals contact the labials. The body is cylindrical, with smooth dorsal scales, without apical pits, in 13 rows. The tail is short; the subcaudals are paired.

== Species ==
The following 67 described species in the genus Calamaria are recognized as being valid.

- Calamaria abramovi Orlov, 2009
- Calamaria abstrusa Inger & Marx, 1965 – Padang reed snake
- Calamaria acutirostris Boulenger, 1896 – pointed snout reed snake
- Calamaria albiventer (Gray, 1834) – white-bellied reed snake
- Calamaria alcalai Weinell, Leviton & R. Brown, 2020 – Alcala's reed snake
- Calamaria alidae Boulenger, 1920 – Bengkulu reed snake
- Calamaria andersoni Yang & Zheng, 2018 – Anderson's reed snake
- Calamaria apraeocularis M.A. Smith, 1927 – Apreocular reed snake
- Calamaria arcana Yeung, Lau & Yang, 2022 – Lingnan reed snake
- Calamaria banggaiensis Koch, Arida, McGuire, Iskander & Böhme, 2009 – Banggai reed snake
- Calamaria battersbyi Inger & Marx, 1965 – Battersby's reed snake
- Calamaria bicolor A.M.C. Duméril, Bibron & A.H.A. Duméril, 1854 – two-colored dwarf snake, bicoloured reed snake
- Calamaria bitorques W. Peters, 1872 – Luzon dwarf snake
- Calamaria boesemani Inger & Marx, 1965 – Boeseman's reed snake
- Calamaria borneensis Bleeker, 1860 – Bornean reed snake
- Calamaria brongersmai Inger & Marx, 1965 – Brongersma's reed snake
- Calamaria buchi Marx & Inger, 1955 – Dalat dwarf snake, Buch's reed snake
- Calamaria butonensis Howard & Gillespie, 2007
- Calamaria ceramensis De Rooij, 1913
- Calamaria concolor Orlov et al., 2010
- Calamaria crassa Lidth de Jeude, 1922 – thick reed snake
- Calamaria curta Boulenger, 1896 – dark-bellied reed snake
- Calamaria doederleini Gough, 1902 – Döderlein's reed snake
- Calamaria dominici Ziegler, Tran & T.Q. Nguyen, 2019 – Dominic's reed snake
- Calamaria eiselti Inger & Marx, 1965 – Eiselt's reed snake
- Calamaria everetti Boulenger, 1893 – Everett's reed snake
- Calamaria forcarti Inger & Marx, 1965 – Forcart's reed snake
- Calamaria gervaisii A.M.C. Duméril, Bibron & A.H.A. Duméril, 1854 – Gervais's worm snake, Philippine dwarf snake
- Calamaria gialaiensis Ziegler, V.S. Nguyen & T.Q. Nguyen, 2008 – Gia Lai reed snake
- Calamaria grabowskyi J.G. Fischer, 1885 – Grabowsky's reed snake
- Calamaria gracillima (Günther, 1872) – slender reed snake
- Calamaria griswoldi Loveridge, 1938 – dwarf reed snake, lined reed snake
- Calamaria hilleniusi Inger & Marx, 1965
- Calamaria ingeri Grismer, Kaiser & Yaakob, 2004
- Calamaria incredibilis Qi et al., 2026
- Calamaria javanica Boulenger, 1891 – Javanese reed snake
- Calamaria joloensis Taylor, 1922 – Jolo worm snake
- Calamaria lateralis Mocquard, 1890 – white-striped reed snake
- Calamaria lautensis De Rooij, 1917
- Calamaria leucogaster Bleeker, 1860 – Ampat Lawang dwarf snake
- Calamaria linnaei F. Boie, 1827 – Linne's dwarf snake
- Calamaria longirostris Howard & Gillespie, 2007
- Calamaria lovii Boulenger, 1887 – Lowi's reed snake
- Calamaria lumbricoidea F. Boie, 1827 – variable reed snake
- Calamaria lumholtzi Andersson, 1923 – Lumholz's reed snake
- Calamaria margaritophora Bleeker, 1860 – stripe-necked reed snake Bleeker's dwarf snake
- Calamaria mecheli Schenkel, 1901 – Mechel's reed snake
- Calamaria melanota Jan, 1862 – Kapuas reed snake
- Calamaria modesta A.M.C. Duméril, Bibron & A.H.A. Duméril, 1854
- Calamaria muelleri Boulenger, 1896 – Mueller's reed snake
- Calamaria nebulosa J.L. Lee, 2021 – clouded reed snake
- Calamaria nuchalis Boulenger, 1896 – narrow-headed reed snake
- Calamaria palavanensis Inger & Marx, 1965 – Palawan worm snake
- Calamaria pavimentata A.M.C. Duméril, Bibron & A.H.A. Duméril, 1854 – collared reed snake
- Calamaria pfefferi Stejneger, 1901 – Pfeffer's reed snake
- Calamaria prakkei Lidth de Jeude, 1893 – Prakke's reed snake
- Calamaria rebentischi Bleeker, 1860 – Rebentisch's reed snake
- Calamaria sangi T.Q. Nguyen, Koch & Ziegler, 2009 – Sang's reed snake
- Calamaria schlegeli A.M.C. Duméril, Bibron & A.H.A. Duméril, 1854 – pink-headed reed snake
- Calamaria schmidti Marx & Inger, 1955 – Schmidt's reed snake
- Calamaria septentrionalis Boulenger, 1890 – Hong Kong dwarf snake
- Calamaria strigiventris Poyarkov, T.V. Nguyen, Orlov & G. Vogel, 2019 – striped-belly reed snake
- Calamaria suluensis Taylor, 1922 – yellow-bellied reed snake, Sulu reed snake
- Calamaria sumatrana Edeling, 1870 – Sumatran reed snake, Sumatra dwarf snake
- Calamaria thanhi Ziegler & Quyet, 2005 – Thanh's reed snake
- Calamaria ulmeri Sackett, 1940 – Ulmer's reed snake
- Calamaria virgulata F. Boie, 1827 – Boie's dwarf snake, short-tailed reed snake
- Calamaria yunnanensis Chernov, 1962 – Yunnan reed snake

Nota bene: A binomial authority in parentheses indicates that the species was originally described with a different name.
