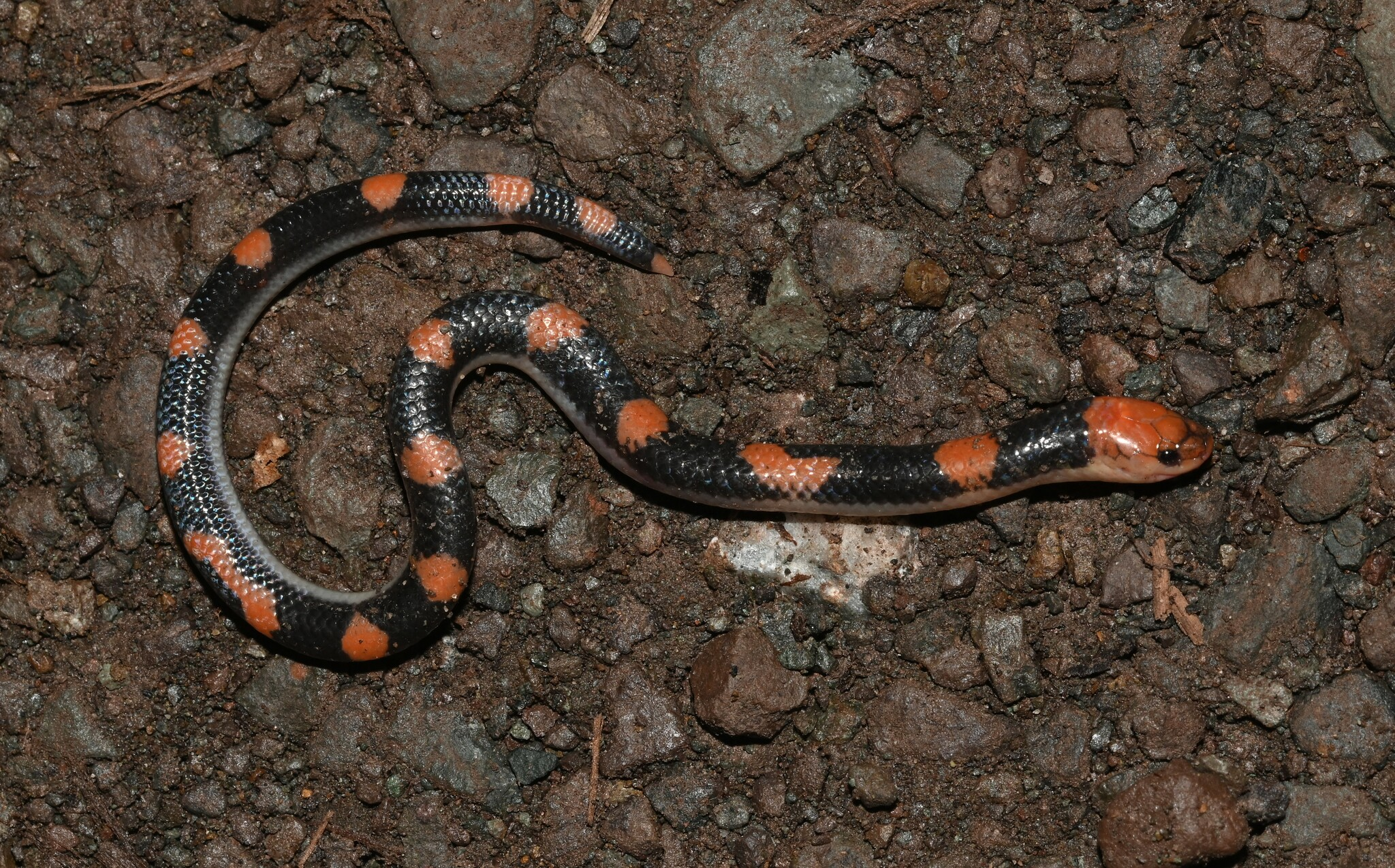

Conservation status
- Least Concern (IUCN 3.1)

Scientific classification
- Kingdom: Animalia
- Phylum: Chordata
- Class: Reptilia
- Order: Squamata
- Suborder: Serpentes
- Family: Colubridae
- Genus: Calamaria
- Species: C. hilleniusi

Binomial name
- Calamaria hilleniusi Inger & Marx, 1965
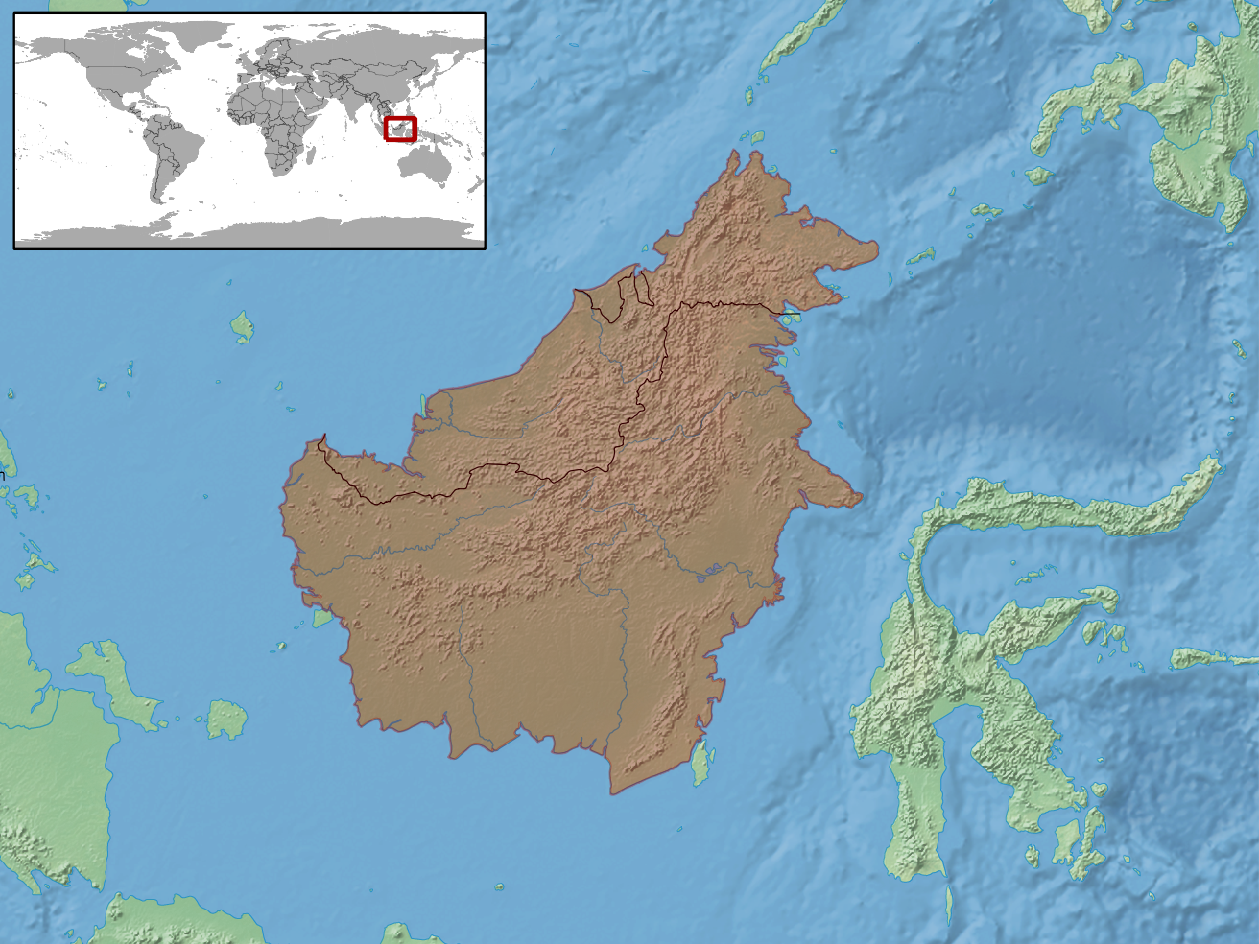

= Calamaria hilleniusi =

Species of snake

Calamaria hilleniusi is a species of snake in the subfamily Calamariinae of the family Colubridae. The species is native to Oceania and Southeast Asia.

== Etymology ==
The specific name, hilleniusi, is in honor of Dutch herpetologist Dick Hillenius.

== Geographic distribution ==
Calamaria hilleniusi is found in Brunei, Indonesia, and Malaysia.

== Habitat ==
The preferred natural habitat of Calamaria hillenius is forest.

== Behavior ==
Calamaria hilleniusi is terrestrial and semi-fossorial.

== Reproduction ==
Calamaria hilleniusi is oviparous.
