= Calamaria brongersmai =

Conservation status
- Data Deficient (IUCN 3.1)

Scientific classification
- Kingdom: Animalia
- Phylum: Chordata
- Class: Reptilia
- Order: Squamata
- Suborder: Serpentes
- Family: Colubridae
- Genus: Calamaria
- Species: C. brongersmai

Binomial name
- Calamaria brongersmai Inger & Marx, 1965

Species of snake

Calamaria brongersmai, also known commonly as Brongersma's reed snake, is a species of snake in the subfamily Calamariinae of the family, Colubridae. The species is endemic to Sulawesi in Indonesia.

== Etymology ==
The specific name, bongersmai, is in honor of Dutch herpetologist Leo Brongersma.

== Habitat ==
The preferred natural habitat of Calamaria brongersmai is forest, at elevations from sea level to 600 m (2,000 ft).

== Behavior ==
Calamaria brongersmai is terrestrial.

== Reproduction ==
Calamaria brongersmai is oviparous.
