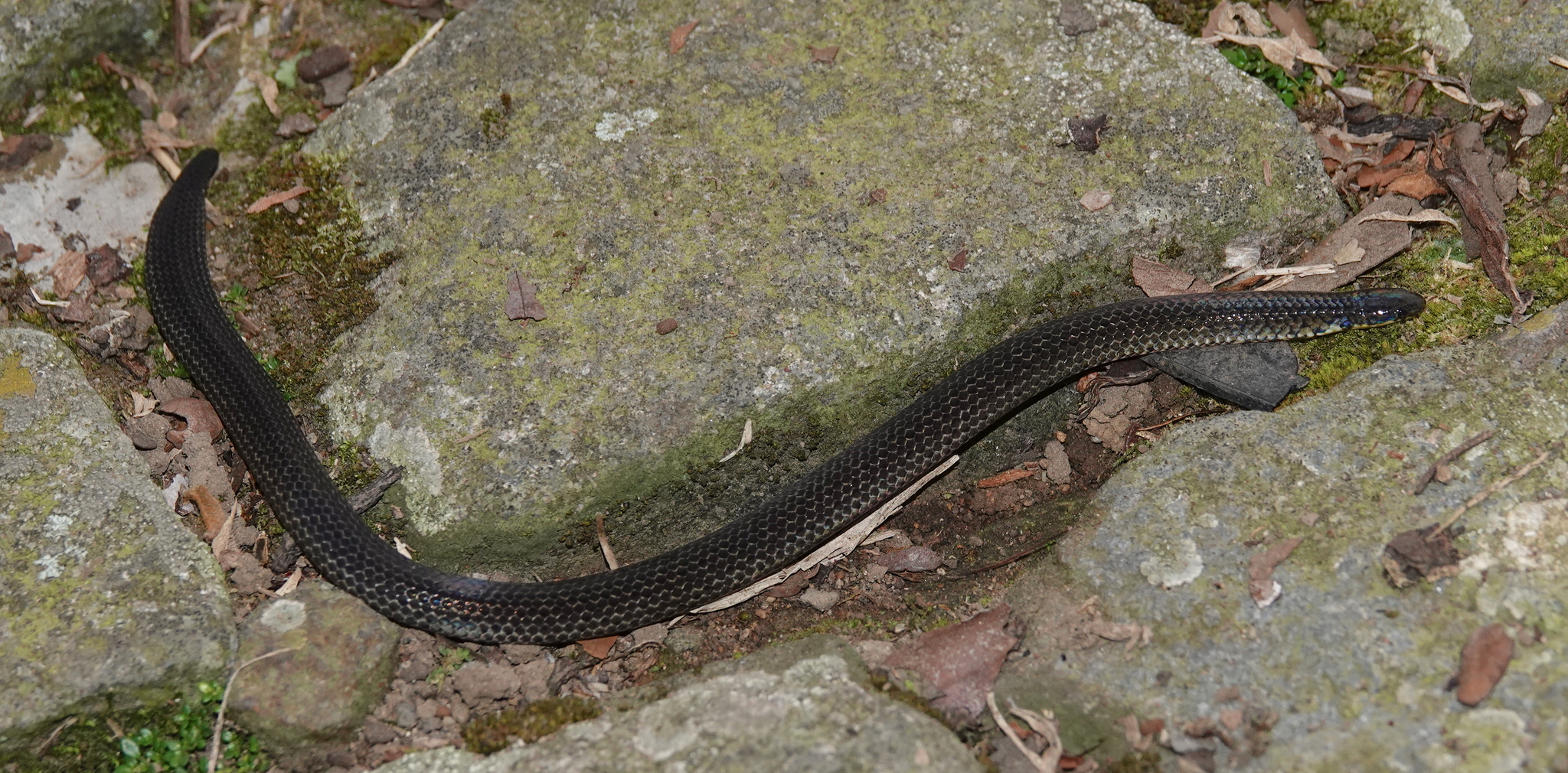

Conservation status
- Least Concern (IUCN 3.1)

Scientific classification
- Kingdom: Animalia
- Phylum: Chordata
- Class: Reptilia
- Order: Squamata
- Suborder: Serpentes
- Family: Colubridae
- Genus: Calamaria
- Species: C. linnaei

Binomial name
- Calamaria linnaei H. Boie in F. Boie, 1827
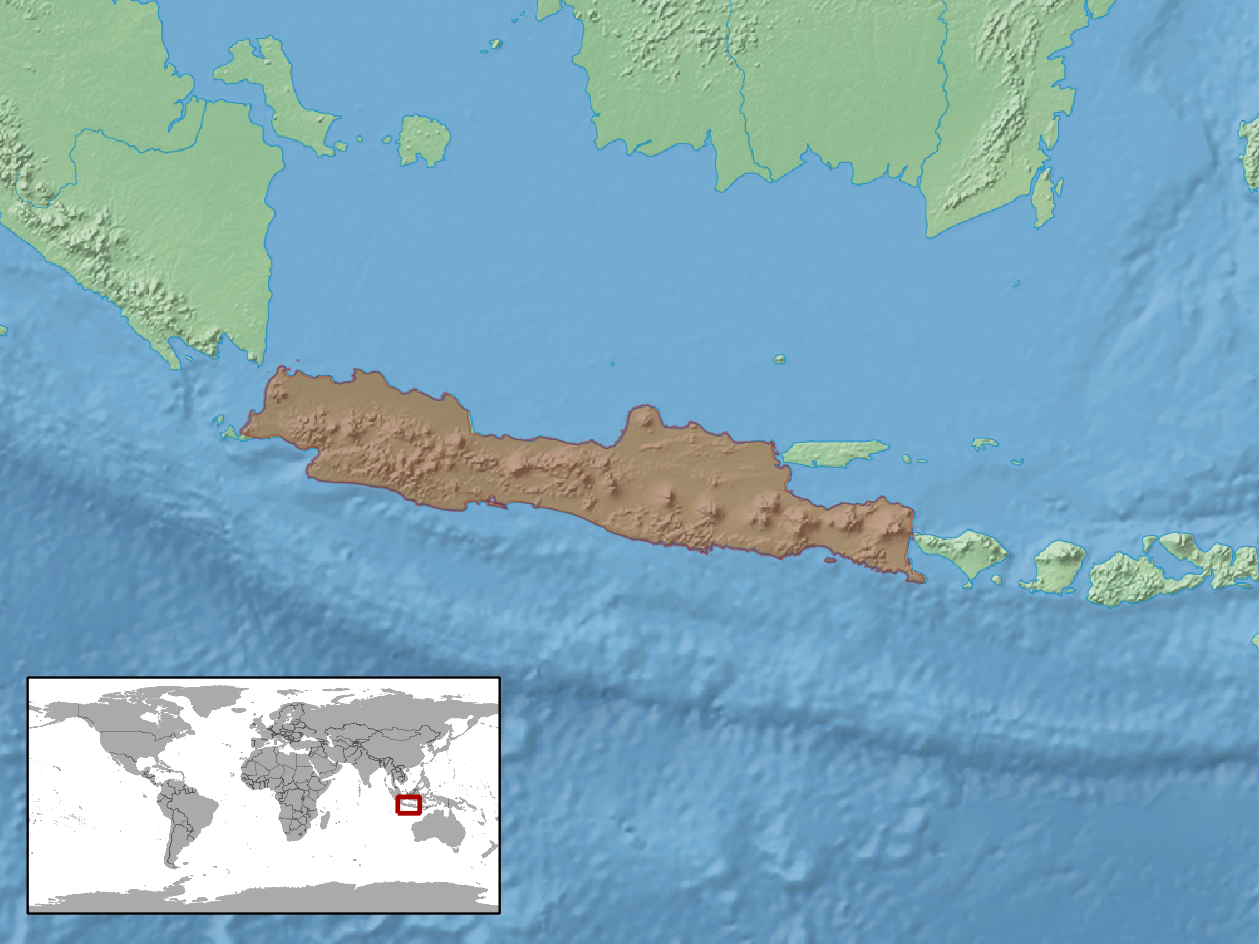

= Calamaria linnaei =

Species of snake

Calamaria linnaei, also known commonly as Linné's dwarf snake, Linne's dwarf snake, Linné's reed snake, and Linnaeus's reed snake, is a species of snake in the subfamily Calamariinae of the family Colubridae. The species is native to Indonesia.

== Etymology ==
The specific name, linnaei, is in honor of Swedish botanist Carl Linné, better known as Linnaeus, who invented the binomial nomenclature system for naming species.

== Geographic range ==
C. linnaei is found throughout the island of Java, but its occurrence elsewhere in Indonesia is uncertain.

== Habitat ==
The preferred natural habitat of C. linnaei is forest, at altitudes of 200–1,200 m (660–3,940 ft), and it also has been found in plantations of tea and coffee.

== Behavior ==
C. linnaei is terrestrial, crepuscular, and fossorial.

== Reproduction ==
C. linnaei is oviparous.
