= Calamaria acutirostris =

Conservation status
- Endangered (IUCN 3.1)

Scientific classification
- Kingdom: Animalia
- Phylum: Chordata
- Class: Reptilia
- Order: Squamata
- Suborder: Serpentes
- Family: Colubridae
- Genus: Calamaria
- Species: C. acutirostris

Binomial name
- Calamaria acutirostris Boulenger, 1896

Species of snake

Calamaria acutirostris, the pointed snout reed snake, is a species of snake in the family, Colubridae. It is found in Indonesia.
