= Calamaria ingeri =

Conservation status
- Critically Endangered (IUCN 3.1)

Scientific classification
- Kingdom: Animalia
- Phylum: Chordata
- Class: Reptilia
- Order: Squamata
- Suborder: Serpentes
- Family: Colubridae
- Genus: Calamaria
- Species: C. ingeri

Binomial name
- Calamaria ingeri Grismer, Kaiser & Yaakob, 2004
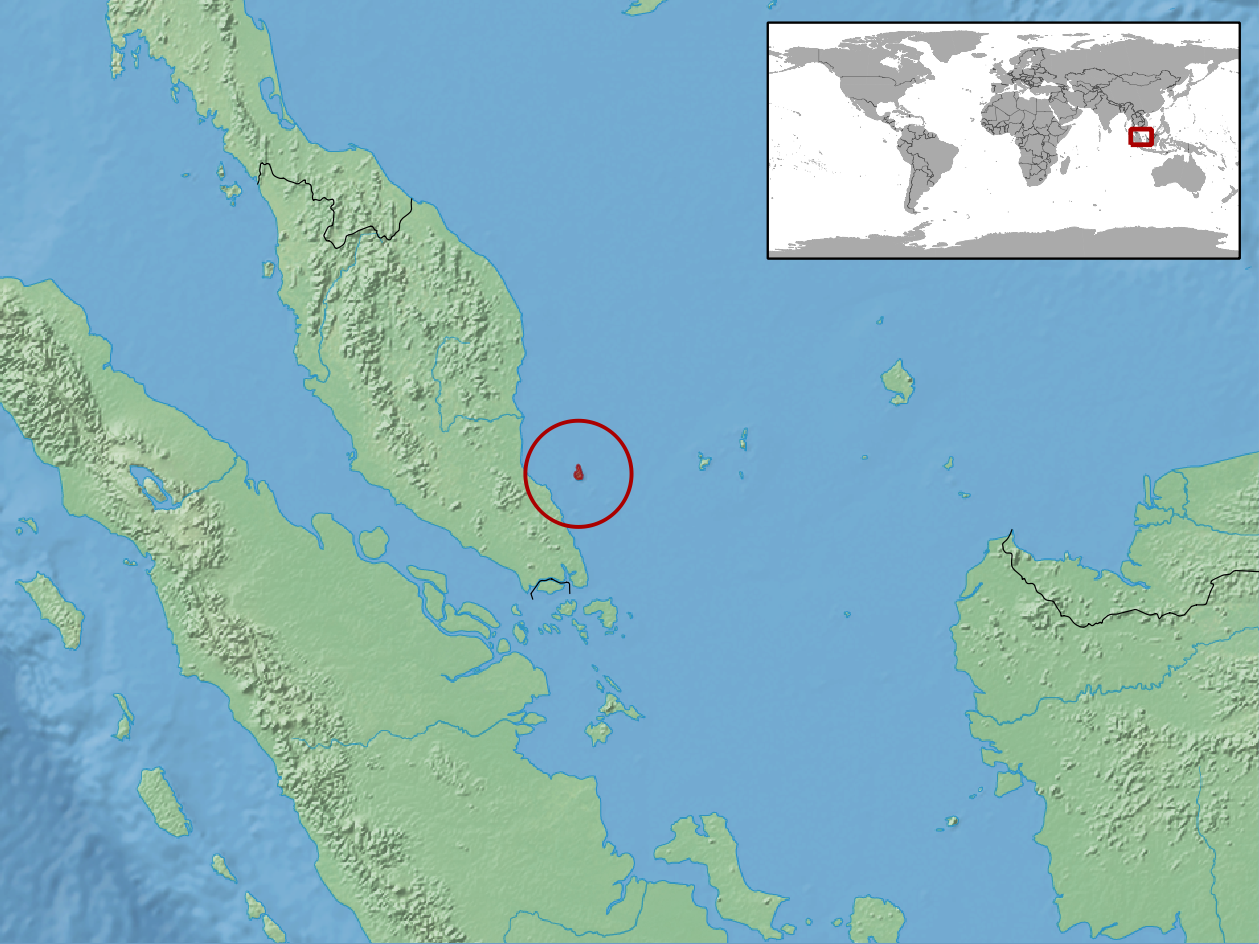

Species of snake

Calamaria ingeri is a species of snake in the subfamily Calamariinae of the family Colubridae. The species is native to Malaysia.

== Geographic distribution ==
Calamaria ingeri is endemic to Tioman Island in Malaysia.

== Habitat ==
The preferred natural habitat of Calamaria ingeri is forest.

== Behavior ==
Calamaria ingeri is terrestrial and fossorial.

== Reproduction ==
Calamaria ingeri is oviparous.

== Etymology ==
The specific name, ingeri, is in honor of American herpetologist Robert F. Inger.
