= Calamaria suluensis =

Conservation status
- Least Concern (IUCN 3.1)

Scientific classification
- Kingdom: Animalia
- Phylum: Chordata
- Class: Reptilia
- Order: Squamata
- Suborder: Serpentes
- Family: Colubridae
- Genus: Calamaria
- Species: C. suluensis

Binomial name
- Calamaria suluensis Taylor, 1922
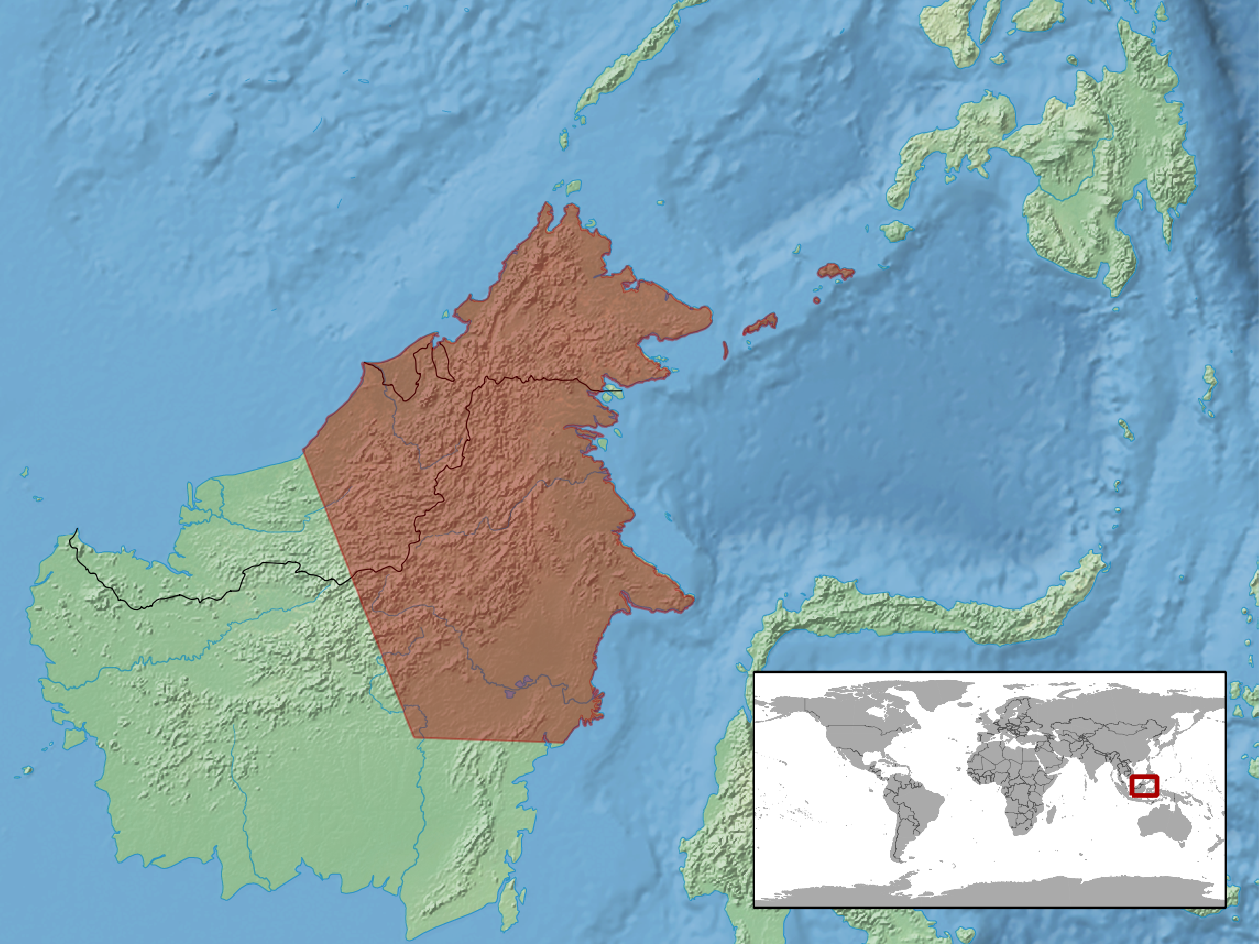

Species of snake

Calamaria suluensis, the yellow-bellied reed snake or Sulu reed snake, is a species of snake in the family, Colubridae. It is found in Indonesia, Malaysia, and the Philippines.
