= Calamaria melanota =

Conservation status
- Least Concern (IUCN 3.1)

Scientific classification
- Kingdom: Animalia
- Phylum: Chordata
- Class: Reptilia
- Order: Squamata
- Suborder: Serpentes
- Family: Colubridae
- Genus: Calamaria
- Species: C. melanota

Binomial name
- Calamaria melanota Jan, 1862
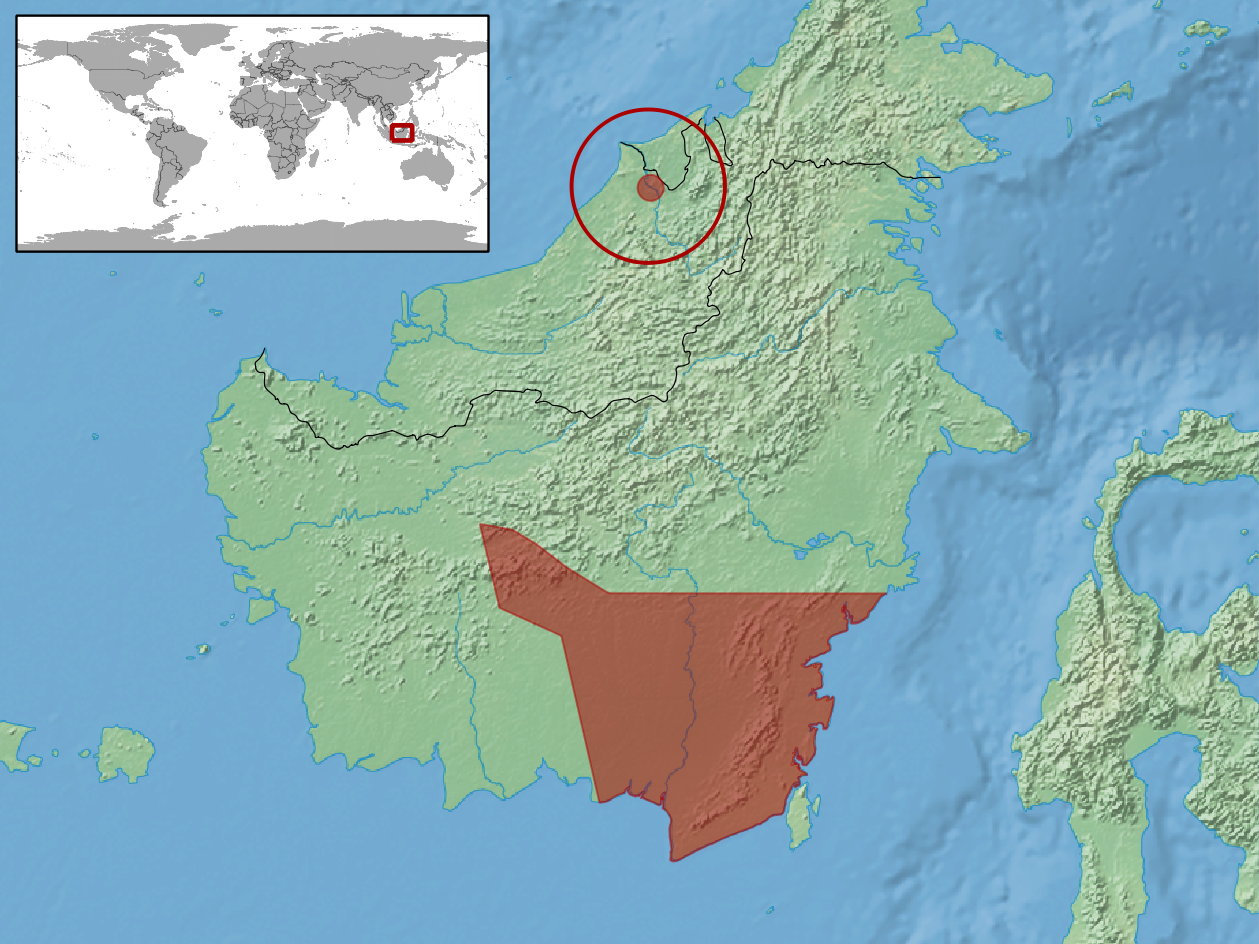

Species of snake

Calamaria melanota, the Kapuas reed snake, is a species of snake in the family, Colubridae. It is found in Indonesia and Malaysia.
