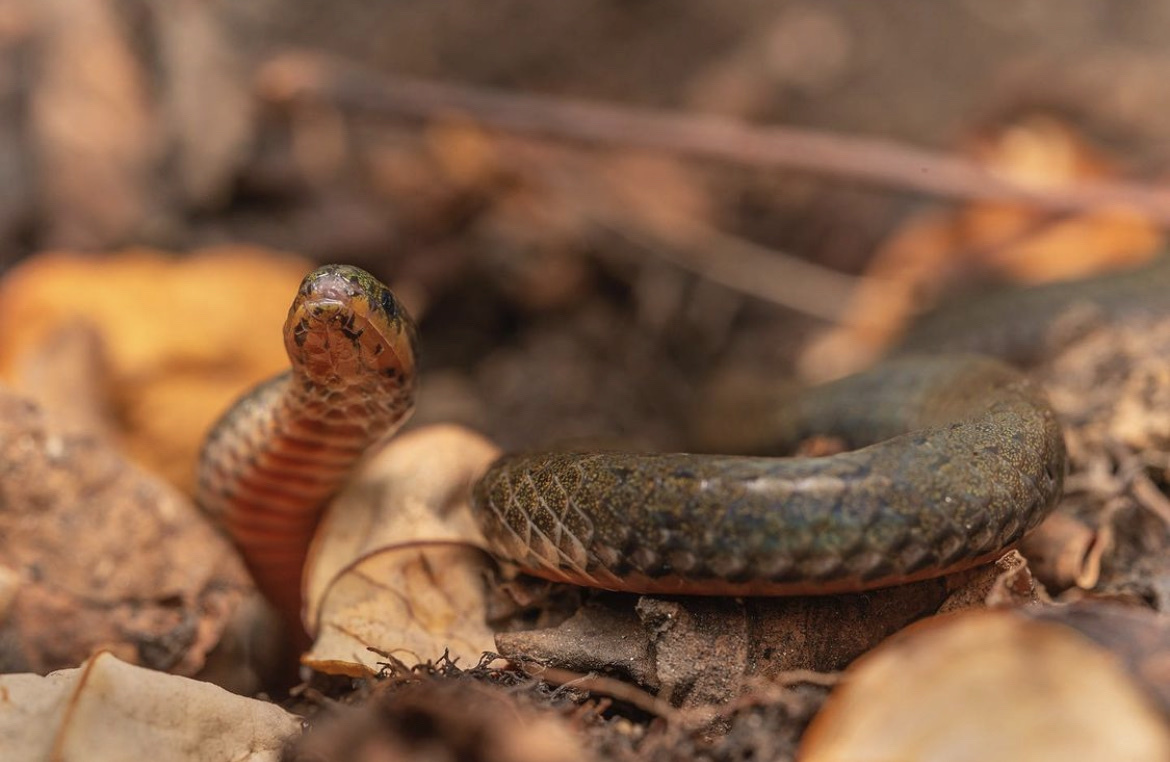

Conservation status
- Least Concern (IUCN 3.1)

Scientific classification
- Kingdom: Animalia
- Phylum: Chordata
- Class: Reptilia
- Order: Squamata
- Suborder: Serpentes
- Family: Colubridae
- Genus: Calamaria
- Species: C. septentrionalis

Binomial name
- Calamaria septentrionalis Boulaenger, 1890
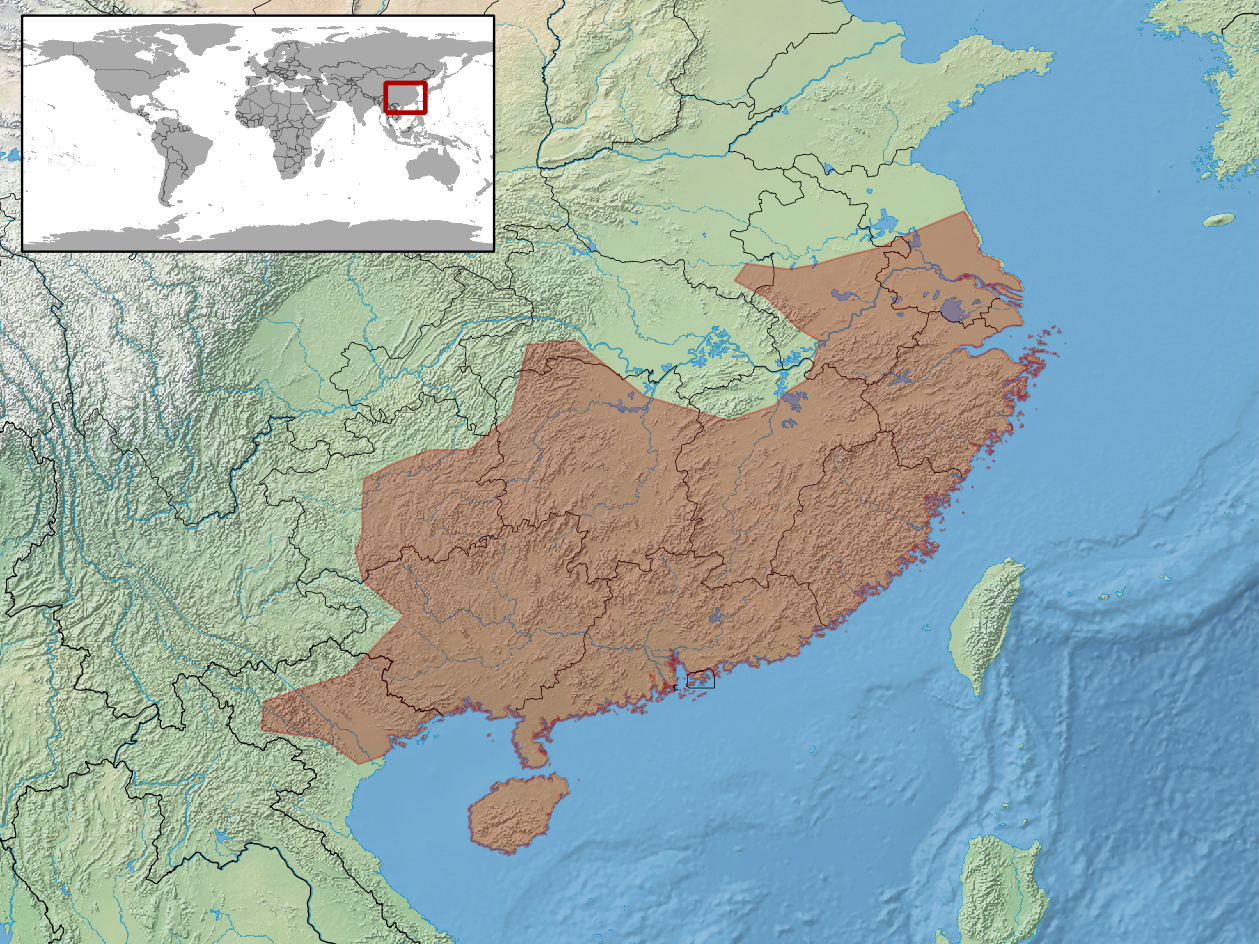

= Calamaria septentrionalis =

Species of snake

Calamaria septentrionalis is a species of snake of the family Colubridae. It is commonly known as the Hong Kong dwarf snake.

== Geographic range ==
The snake is found in China and Vietnam.
