= Calamaria ulmeri =

Conservation status
- Data Deficient (IUCN 3.1)

Scientific classification
- Kingdom: Animalia
- Phylum: Chordata
- Class: Reptilia
- Order: Squamata
- Suborder: Serpentes
- Family: Colubridae
- Genus: Calamaria
- Species: C. ulmeri

Binomial name
- Calamaria ulmeri Sackett, 1940
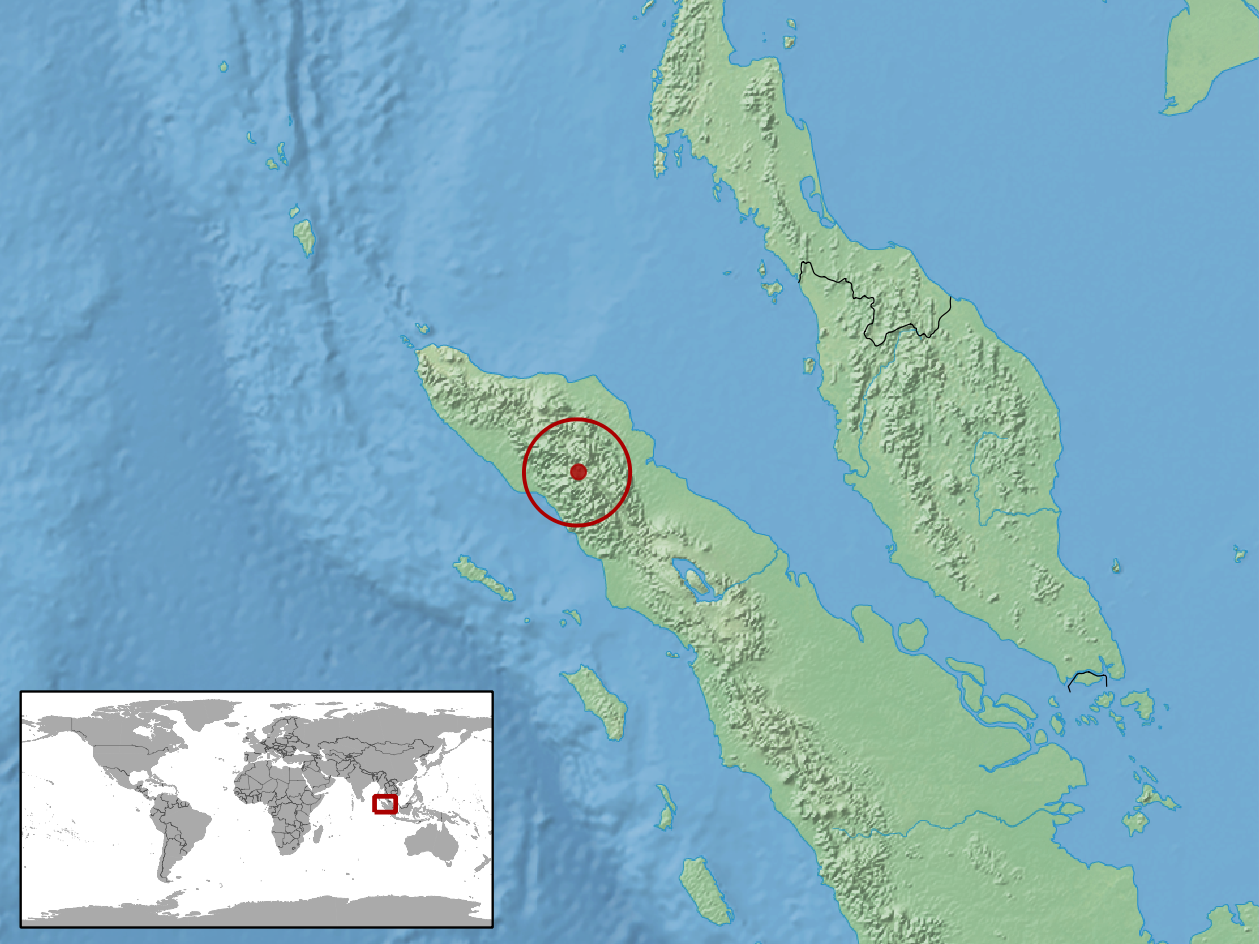

Species of snake

Calamaria ulmeri, commonly known as Ulmer's reed snake, is a species of snake in the family Colubridae. The species is endemic to Sumatra.

== Etymology ==
The specific name, ulmeri, is in honor of American mammalogist Frederick A. Ulmer, Jr. (1892–1974).

== Geographic range ==
C. ulmeri is found in northern Sumatra, and is only known from two specimens.

== Habitat ==
The preferred natural habitat of C. ulmeri is forest, at an altitude of 2,070 m (6,790 ft).

== Description ==
The holotype of C. ulmeri has a snout-to-vent length of 28.4 cm (11.2 in), and an incomplete tail. It is brownish dorsally, and it is yellow ventrally.

== Reproduction ==
C. ulmeri is oviparous.
