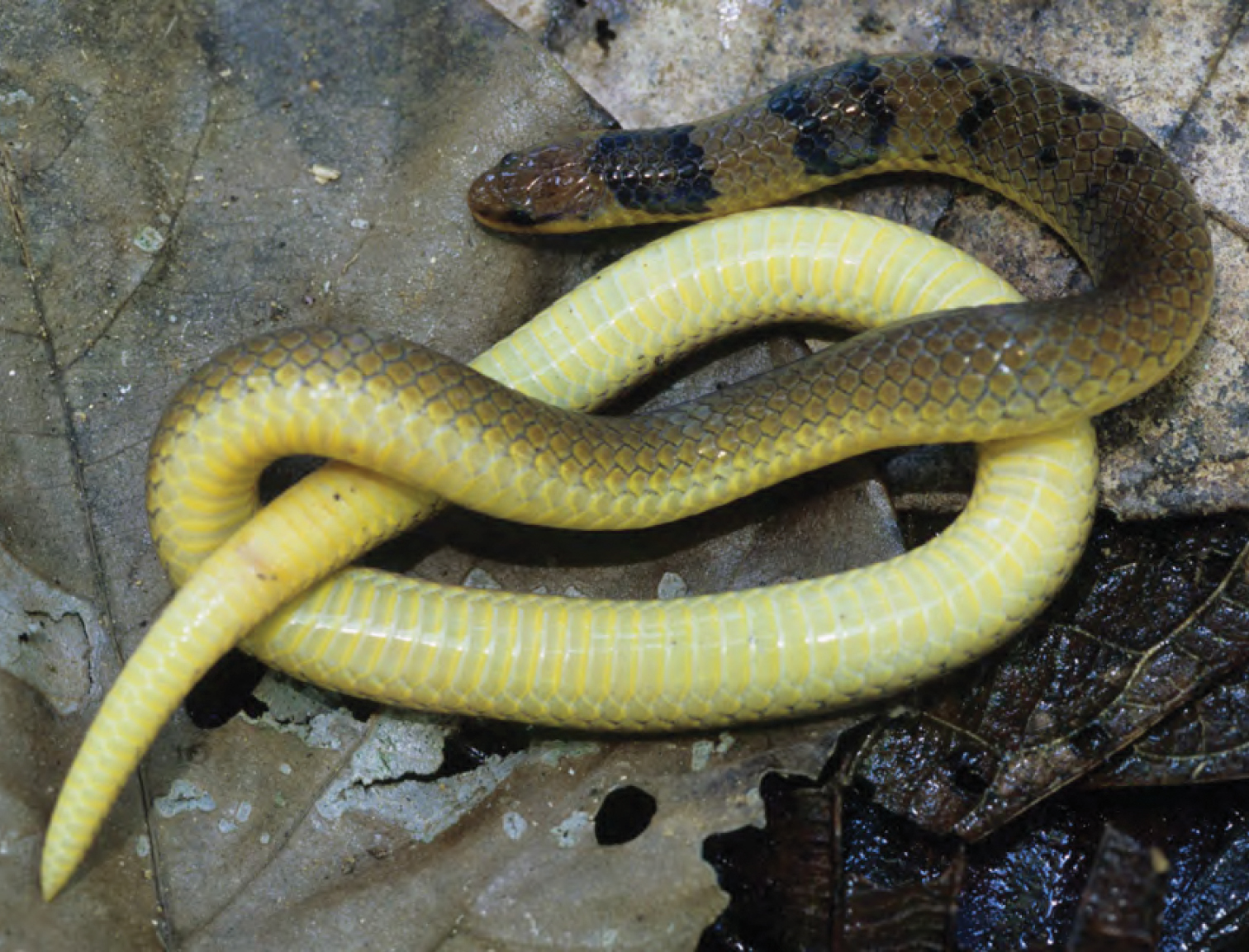

Conservation status
- Least Concern (IUCN 3.1)

Scientific classification
- Kingdom: Animalia
- Phylum: Chordata
- Class: Reptilia
- Order: Squamata
- Suborder: Serpentes
- Family: Colubridae
- Genus: Calamaria
- Species: C. bitorques

Binomial name
- Calamaria bitorques Peters, 1872
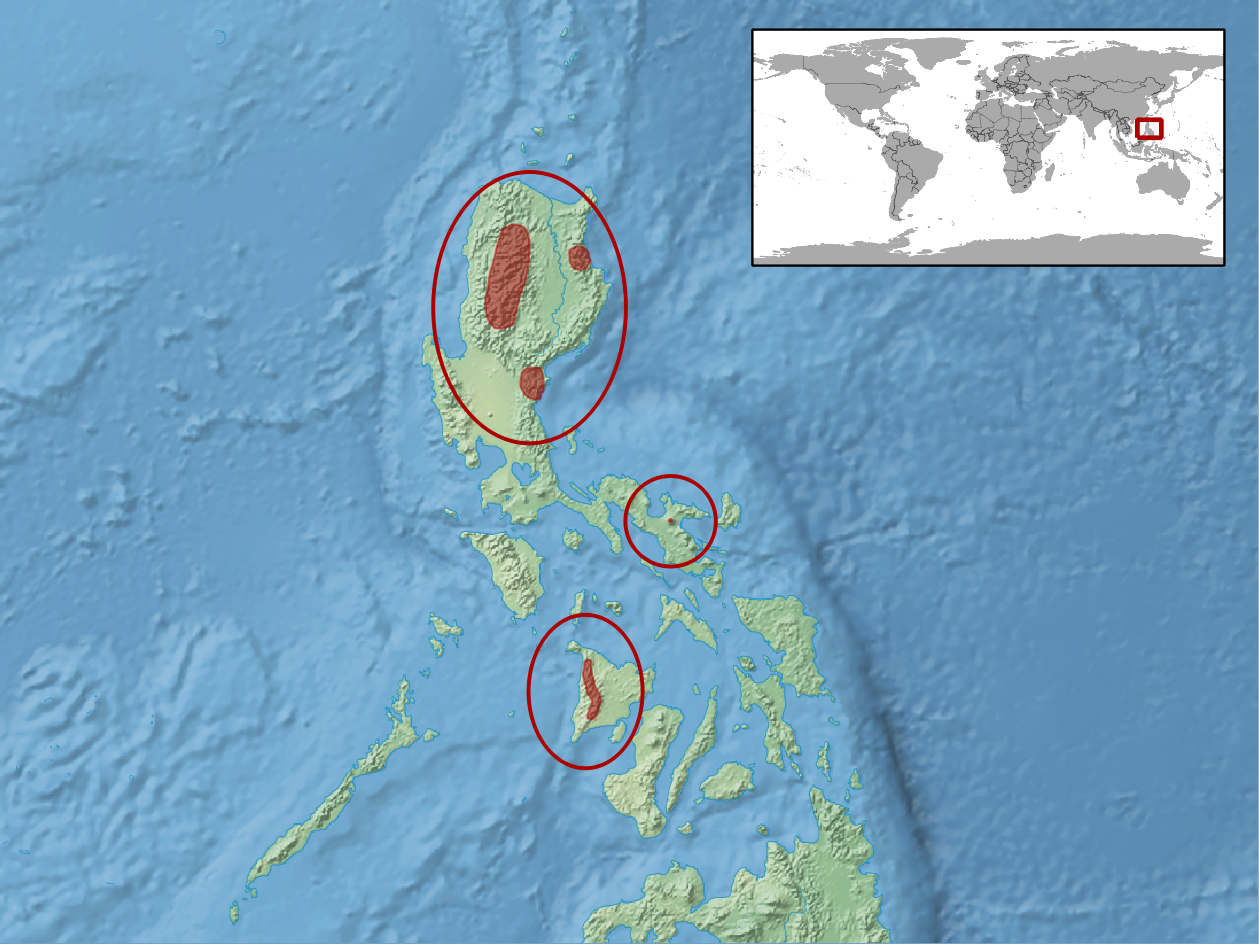

= Calamaria bitorques =

Species of snake

Calamaria bitorques is a species of snake of the family Colubridae. It is commonly known as the Luzon dwarf snake.

== Geographic range ==
The snake is endemic to the Philippines where it is found on the islands of Luzon and Panay.
