= Calamaria gracillima =

Conservation status
- Data Deficient (IUCN 3.1)

Scientific classification
- Kingdom: Animalia
- Phylum: Chordata
- Class: Reptilia
- Order: Squamata
- Suborder: Serpentes
- Family: Colubridae
- Genus: Calamaria
- Species: C. gracillima

Binomial name
- Calamaria gracillima (Günther, 1872)

Species of snake

Calamaria gracillima, the slender reed snake, is a species of snake in the family, Colubridae. It is found in Malaysia.
