= Pfeffer's reed snake =

Conservation status
- Endangered (IUCN 3.1)

Scientific classification
- Kingdom: Animalia
- Phylum: Chordata
- Class: Reptilia
- Order: Squamata
- Suborder: Serpentes
- Family: Colubridae
- Genus: Calamaria
- Species: C. pfefferi

Binomial name
- Calamaria pfefferi Stejneger, 1901

Species of snake

Pfeffer's reed snake (Calamaria pfefferi) is a species of dwarf snake in the family Colubridae. The species is endemic to Japan.

== Etymology ==
The specific name, pfefferi, is in honor of German zoologist Georg Johann Pfeffer.

== Geographic range ==
C. pfefferi is found on Miyako-jima and Irabu-jima in the Ryukyu Islands of Japan.

== Habitat ==
The preferred habitats of C. pfefferi are grassland and forest.

== Reproduction ==
C. pfefferi is oviparous.
