= Calamaria borneensis =

Conservation status
- Least Concern (IUCN 3.1)

Scientific classification
- Kingdom: Animalia
- Phylum: Chordata
- Class: Reptilia
- Order: Squamata
- Suborder: Serpentes
- Family: Colubridae
- Genus: Calamaria
- Species: C. borneensis

Binomial name
- Calamaria borneensis Bleeker, 1860
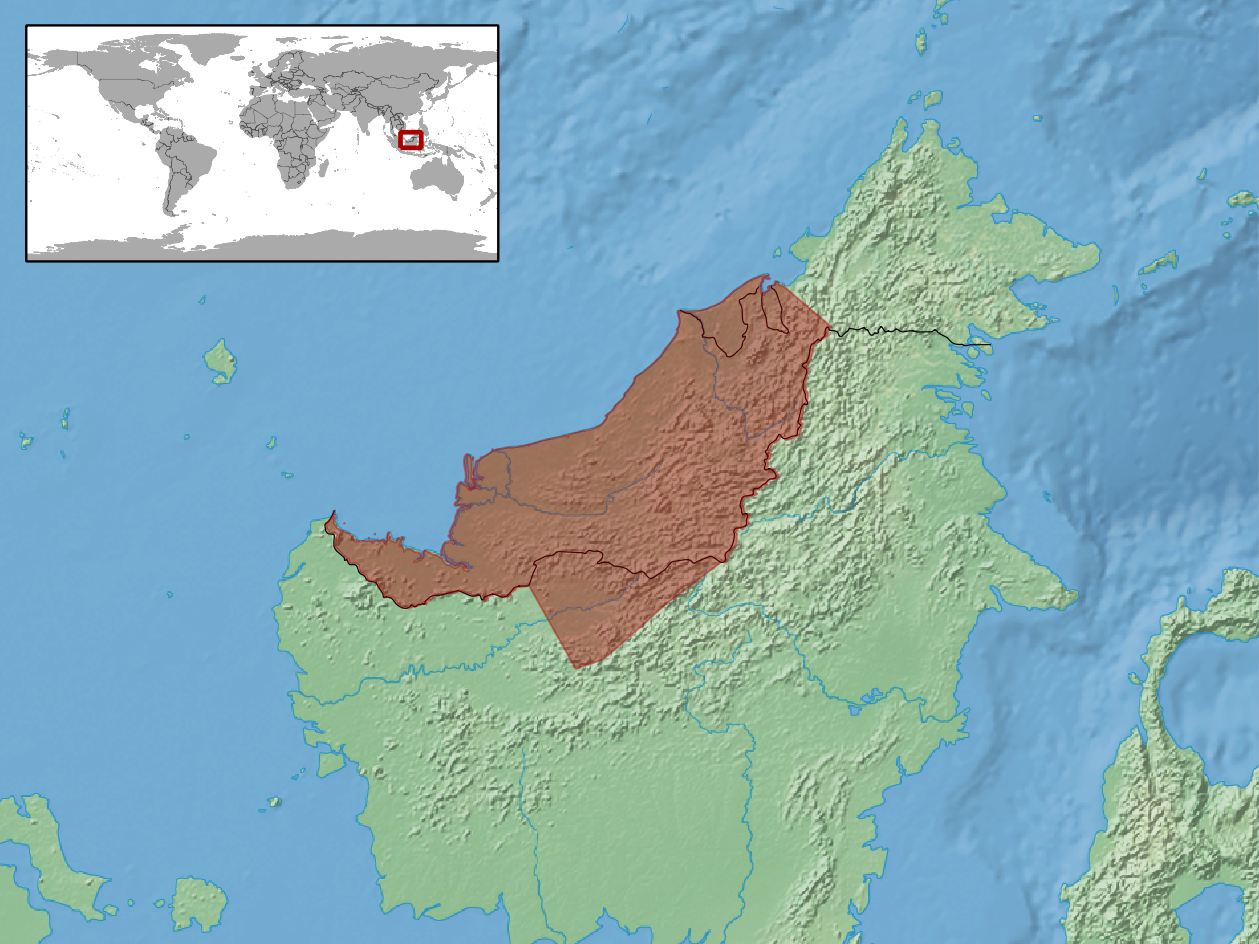

Species of snake

Calamaria borneensis, the Bornean reed snake, is a species of snake in the family, Colubridae. It is found in Indonesia and Malaysia.
