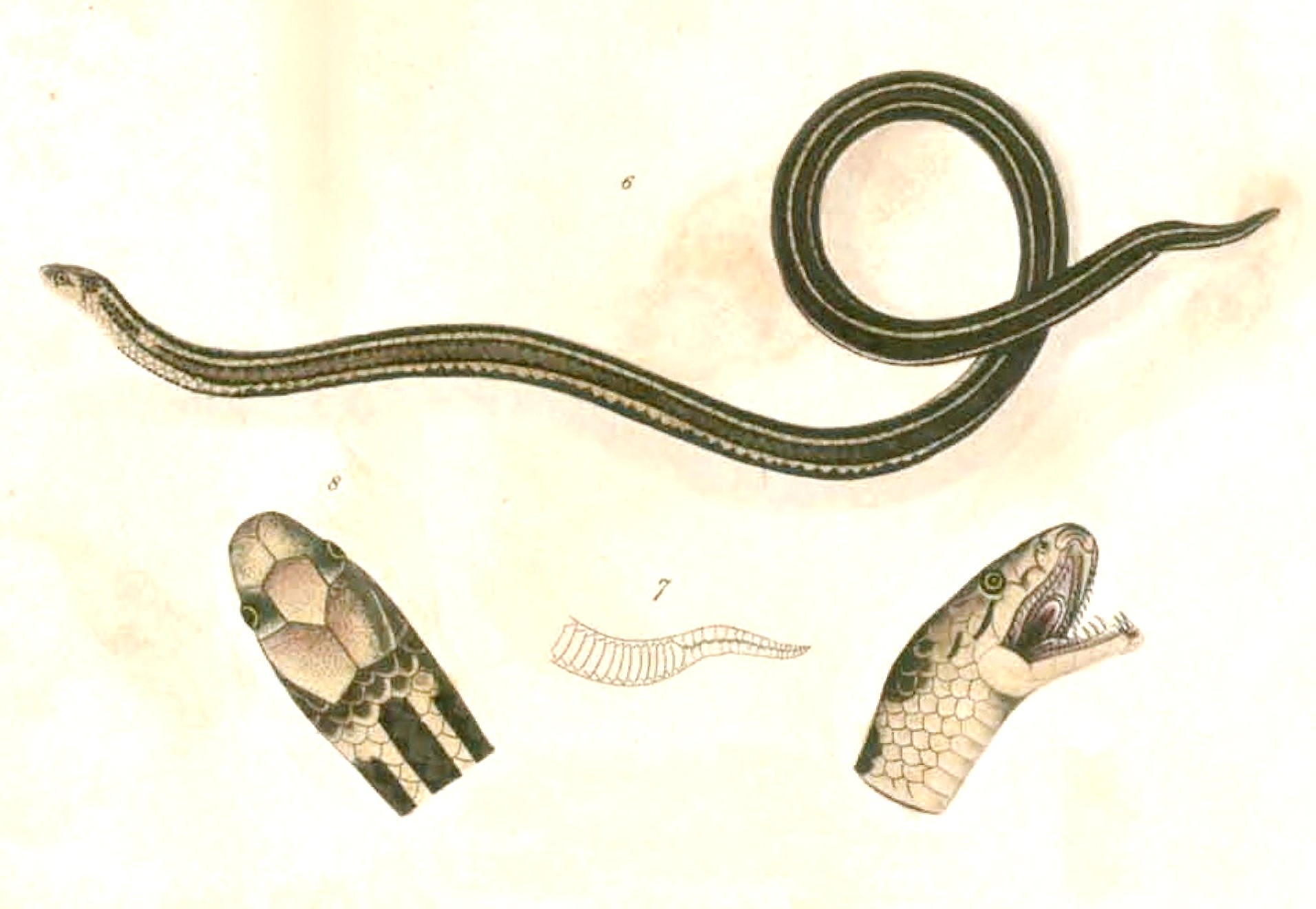

Conservation status
- Least Concern (IUCN 3.1)

Scientific classification
- Kingdom: Animalia
- Phylum: Chordata
- Class: Reptilia
- Order: Squamata
- Suborder: Serpentes
- Family: Colubridae
- Genus: Calamaria
- Species: C. albiventer

Binomial name
- Calamaria albiventer (Gray, 1835)

Synonyms
- Changulia albiventer Gray, 1835

= Calamaria albiventer =

Species of snake

Calamaria albiventer, the white-bellied reed snake, is a species of snake in the family Colubridae . It is found in parts of Peninsular Malaysia, possibly Singapore, and in Sumatra, Indonesia.
