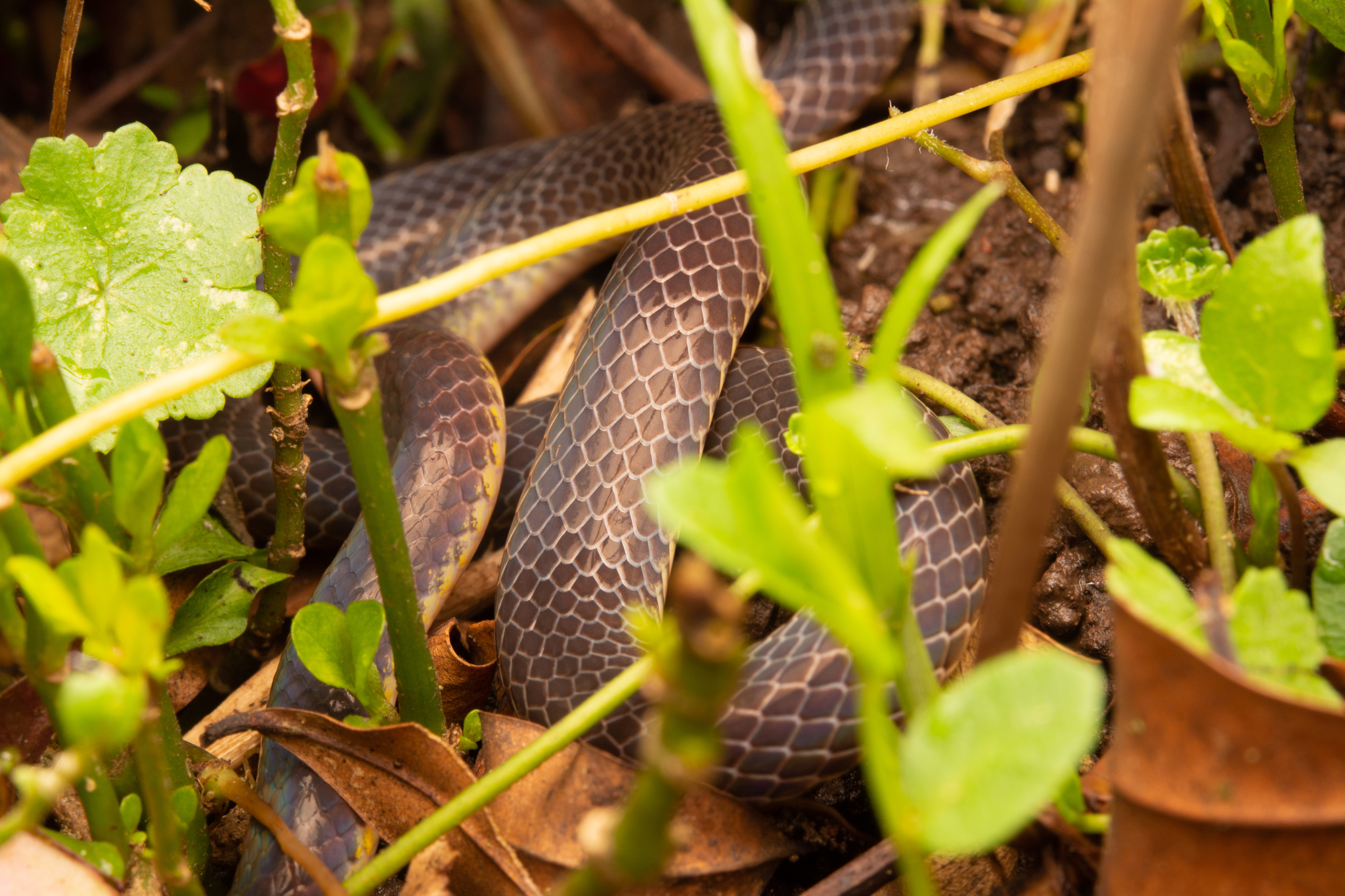

Conservation status
- Least Concern (IUCN 3.1)

Scientific classification
- Kingdom: Animalia
- Phylum: Chordata
- Class: Reptilia
- Order: Squamata
- Suborder: Serpentes
- Family: Colubridae
- Genus: Calamaria
- Species: C. bicolor

Binomial name
- Calamaria bicolor Duméril, Bibron & Duméril, 1854
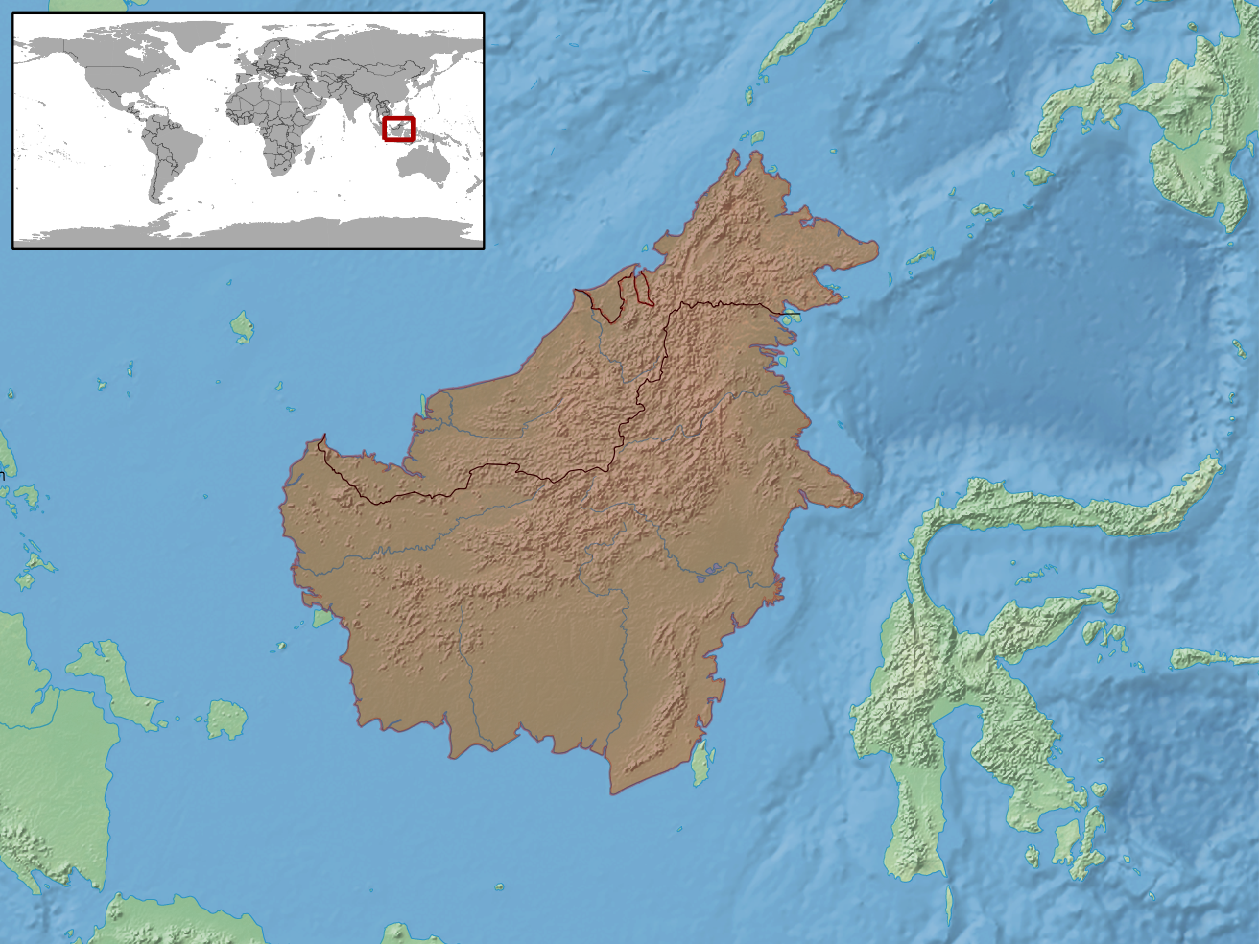

= Calamaria bicolor =

Species of snake

Calamaria bicolor is a species of snake of the family Colubridae. Its vernacular names are two-colored dwarf snake and bicoloured reed snake.

== Geographic range ==
The snake appears to be endemic to Borneo where it is widespread, being found in Kalimantan (Indonesia), Sabah, and Sarawak (Malaysia). Its presence in Java is uncertain.
