= Calamaria dominici =

Scientific classification
- Kingdom: Animalia
- Phylum: Chordata
- Class: Reptilia
- Order: Squamata
- Suborder: Serpentes
- Family: Colubridae
- Genus: Calamaria
- Species: C. dominici

Binomial name
- Calamaria dominici Ziegler, Tran & T.Q. Nguyen, 2019

Species of snake

Calamaria dominici, also known commonly as Dominic's reed snake, is a species of snake in the subfamily Calamariinae of the family Colubridae. The species is endemic to Vietnam.

== Etymology ==
The specific name, dominici, is in honor of British investor Dominic T. Charles Scriven for his contribution towards wildlife conservation in Vietnam.

== Description ==
Calamaria dominici is vividly marked. Dorsally, it is black, with scattered yellow spots. Ventrally, it is black, with broken yellow crossbars.

== Geographic distribution ==
Calamaria dominici is known only from the holotype which was collected in the province formerly known as Dak Nong, now part of Lam Dong province, Vietnam.

== Habitat ==
The preferred natural habitat of Calamaria dominici is forest, at an elevation of 1,240 m (4,070 ft).
