= Calamaria nebulosa =

Scientific classification
- Kingdom: Animalia
- Phylum: Chordata
- Class: Reptilia
- Order: Squamata
- Suborder: Serpentes
- Family: Colubridae
- Genus: Calamaria
- Species: C. nebulosa

Binomial name
- Calamaria nebulosa Lee, 2021

Species of snake

Calamaria nebulosa, the clouded reed snake, is a species of snake in the family, Colubridae. It is found in Laos.
