= Calamaria alcalai =

Conservation status
- Data Deficient (IUCN 3.1)

Scientific classification
- Kingdom: Animalia
- Phylum: Chordata
- Class: Reptilia
- Order: Squamata
- Suborder: Serpentes
- Family: Colubridae
- Genus: Calamaria
- Species: C. alcalai

Binomial name
- Calamaria alcalai Weinell, Leviton & Brown, 2020

Species of snake

Calamaria alcalai, also known commonly as Alcala's reed snake, is a species of snake in the subfamily Calamariinae of the family, Colubridae. The species is endemic to the island of Mindoro in the Philippines.

== Etymology ==
The specific name, alcalai, is in honor of Filipino herpetologist Angel C. Alcala.

== Description ==
Dorsally, Calamaria alcalai is maroon. Ventrally, it is yellow to cream-colored. The dorsal scales are arranged in 13 rows throughout the length of the body.

== Habitat ==
The preferred natural habitat of Calamaria alcalai is forest.

== Behavior ==
Calamaria alcalai is terrestrial and fossorial.

== Diet ==
Calamaria alcalai preys exclusively upon worms.

== Reproduction ==
The mode of reproduction of Calamaria alcalai is unknown.
