= Calamaria rebentischi =

Conservation status
- Data Deficient (IUCN 3.1)

Scientific classification
- Kingdom: Animalia
- Phylum: Chordata
- Class: Reptilia
- Order: Squamata
- Suborder: Serpentes
- Family: Colubridae
- Genus: Calamaria
- Species: C. rebentischi

Binomial name
- Calamaria rebentischi Bleeker, 1860
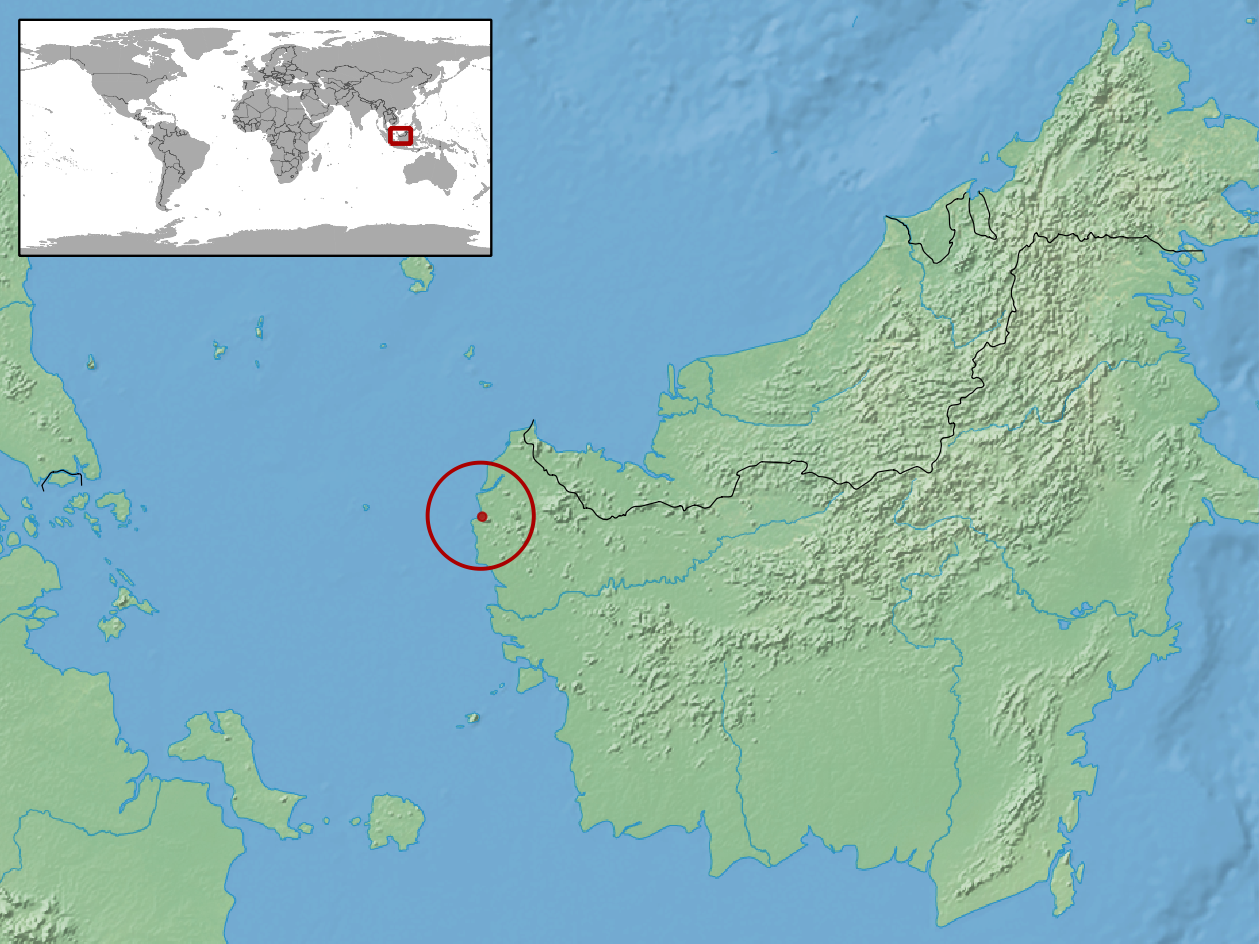

Species of snake

Calamaria rebentischi, Rebentisch's reed snake, is a species of snake in the family, Colubridae. It is found in Indonesia.
