= Calamaria arcana =

Scientific classification
- Kingdom: Animalia
- Phylum: Chordata
- Class: Reptilia
- Order: Squamata
- Suborder: Serpentes
- Family: Colubridae
- Genus: Calamaria
- Species: C. arcana

Binomial name
- Calamaria arcana Yeung, Lau, & Yang, 2022

Species of snake

Calamaria arcana, the Lingnan reed snake, is a species of snake in the family, Colubridae. It is found in China.
