= Calamaria longirostris =

Conservation status
- Critically Endangered (IUCN 3.1)

Scientific classification
- Kingdom: Animalia
- Phylum: Chordata
- Class: Reptilia
- Order: Squamata
- Suborder: Serpentes
- Family: Colubridae
- Genus: Calamaria
- Species: C. longirostris

Binomial name
- Calamaria longirostris Howard & Gillespie, 2007

Species of snake

Calamaria longirostris is a species of snake in the family, Colubridae. It is found in Indonesia.
