= Calamaria leucogaster =

Conservation status
- Least Concern (IUCN 3.1)

Scientific classification
- Kingdom: Animalia
- Phylum: Chordata
- Class: Reptilia
- Order: Squamata
- Suborder: Serpentes
- Family: Colubridae
- Genus: Calamaria
- Species: C. leucogaster

Binomial name
- Calamaria leucogaster Bleeker, 1860
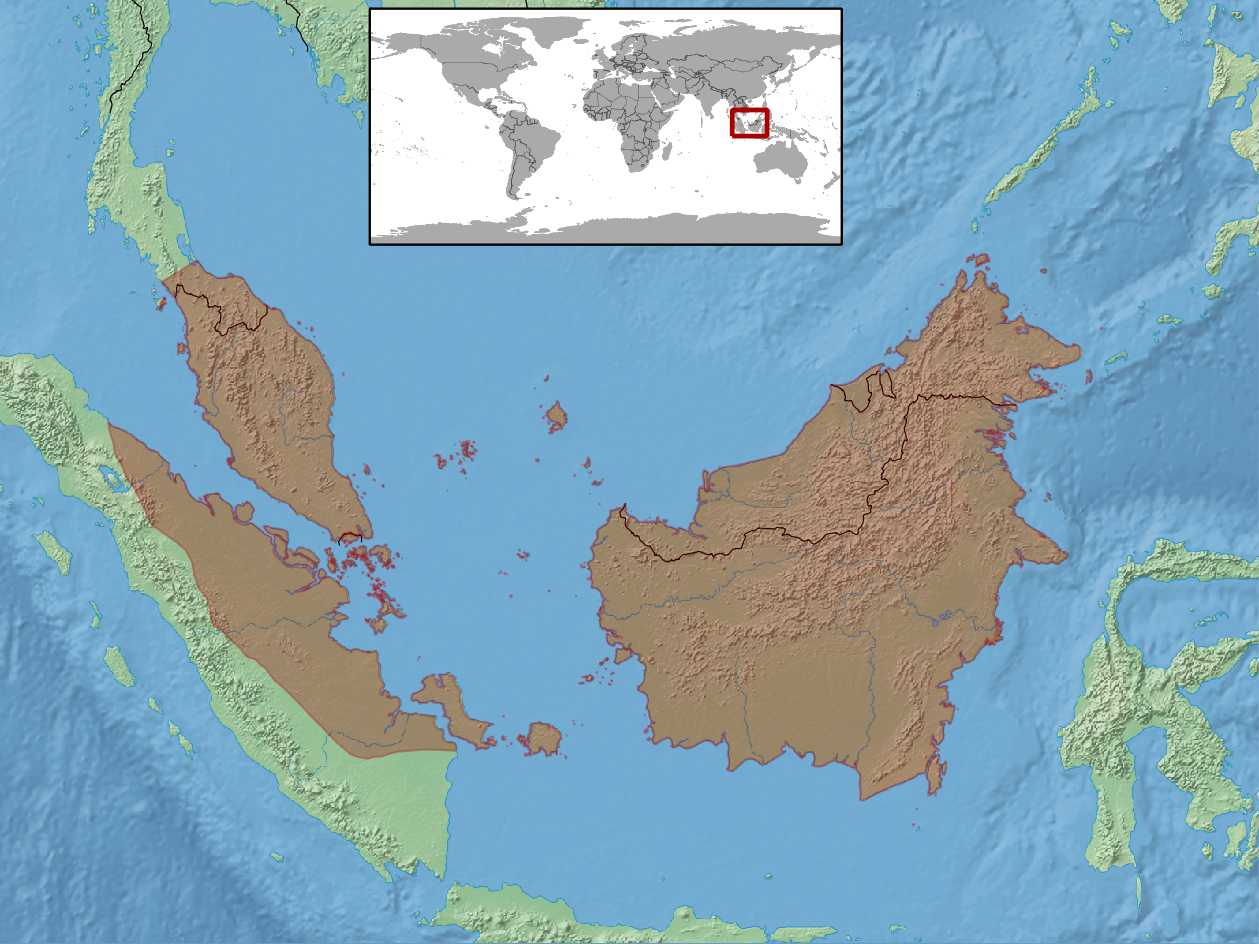

Species of snake

Calamaria leucogaster, the Ampat Lawang dwarf snake, is a species of snake in the family, Colubridae. It is found in Indonesia and Malaysia.
