= Calamaria curta =

Conservation status
- Data Deficient (IUCN 3.1)

Scientific classification
- Kingdom: Animalia
- Phylum: Chordata
- Class: Reptilia
- Order: Squamata
- Suborder: Serpentes
- Family: Colubridae
- Genus: Calamaria
- Species: C. curta

Binomial name
- Calamaria curta Boulenger, 1896

Species of snake

Calamaria curta, the dark-bellied reed snake, is a species of snake in the family, Colubridae. It is found in Indonesia.
