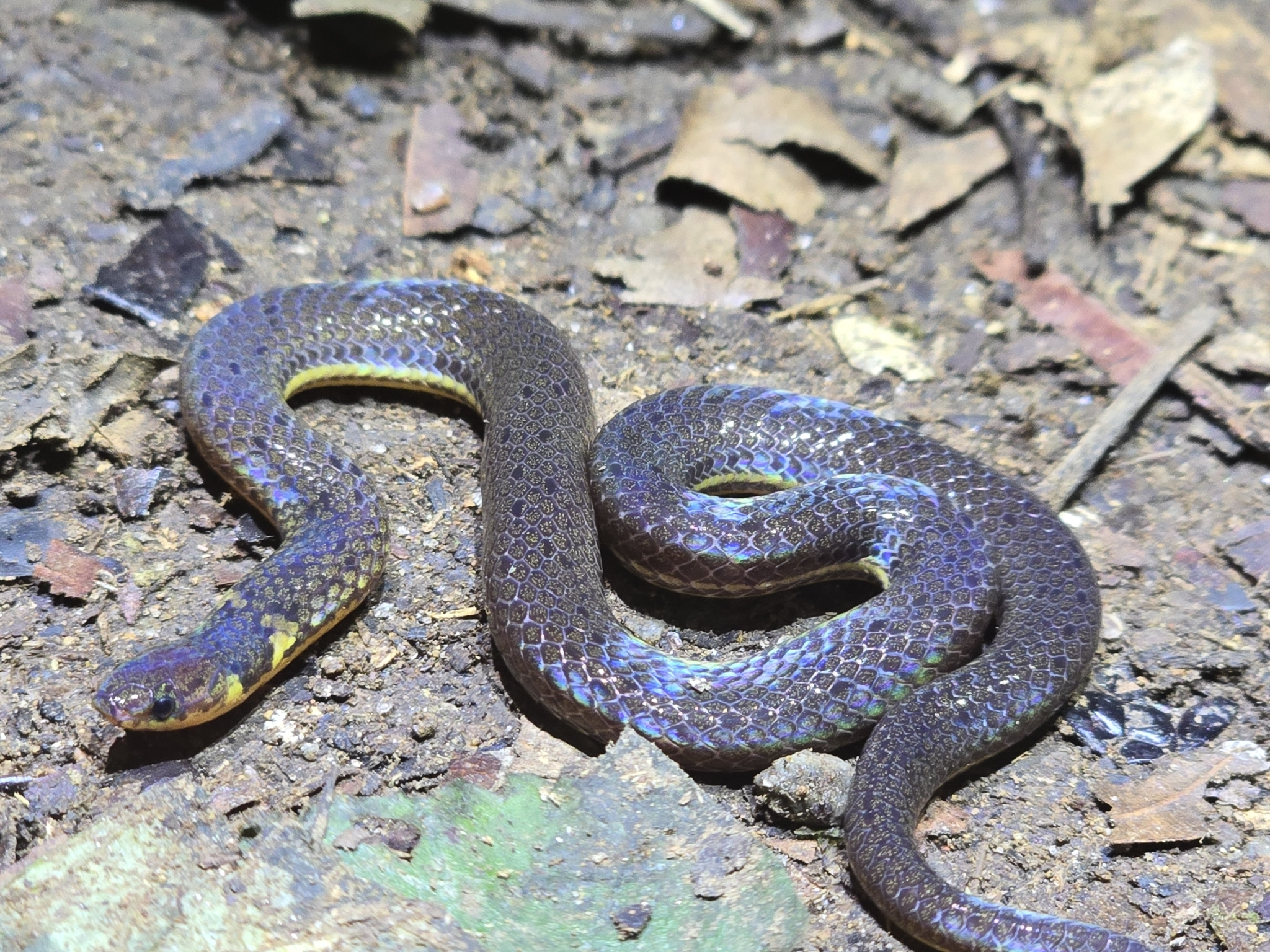

Conservation status
- Least Concern (IUCN 3.1)

Scientific classification
- Kingdom: Animalia
- Phylum: Chordata
- Class: Reptilia
- Order: Squamata
- Suborder: Serpentes
- Family: Colubridae
- Genus: Calamaria
- Species: C. virgulata

Binomial name
- Calamaria virgulata Boie, 1827
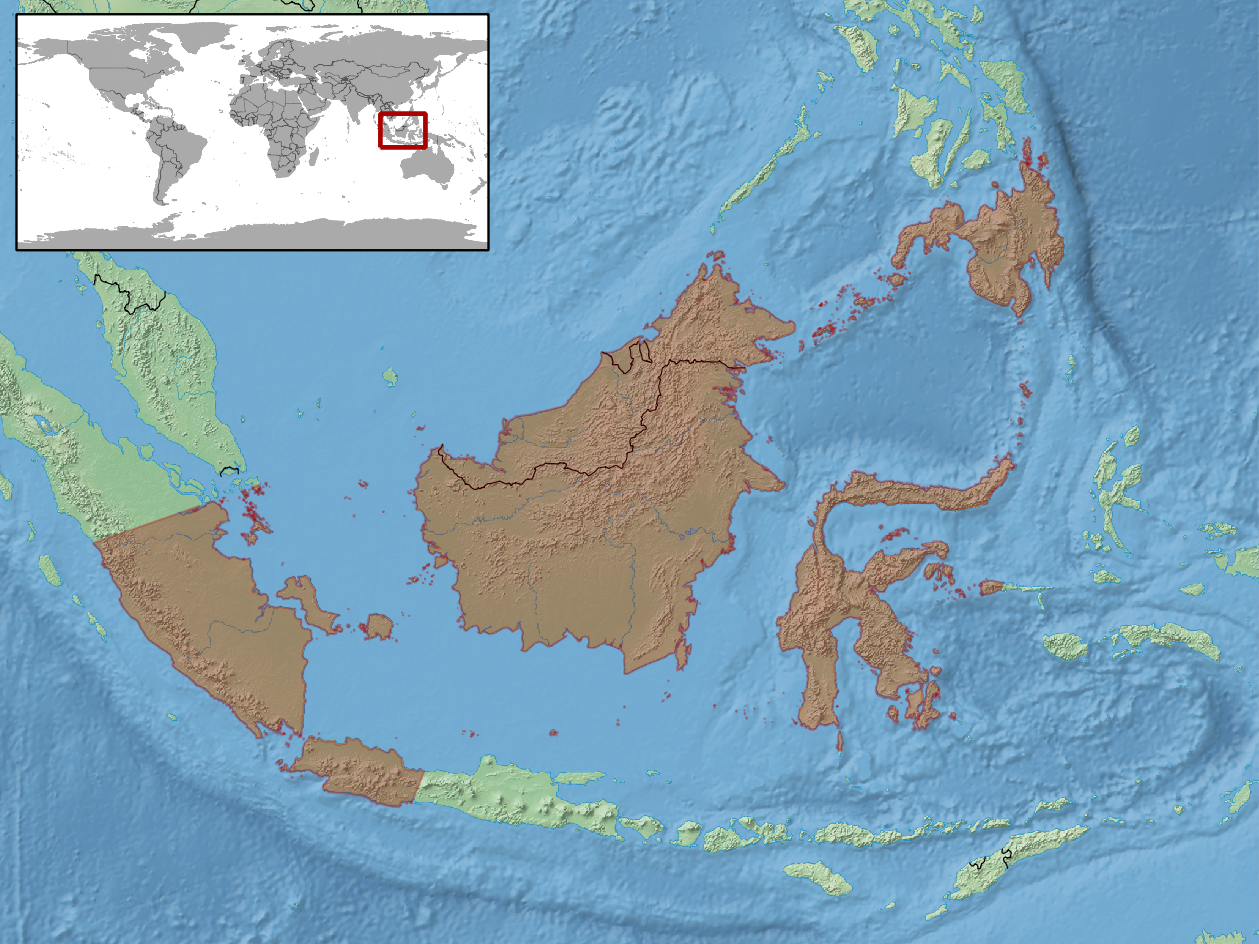

= Calamaria virgulata =

Species of snake

Calamaria virgulata, Boie's dwarf snake or short-tailed reed snake, is a species of snake in the family, Colubridae. It is found in Indonesia, Malaysia, and the Philippines.
