= Hymen Marx =

American herpetologist (1925–2007)

Hymen Marx (27 June 1925, Chicago – 25 January 2007, Sun City, Arizona) was an American herpetologist.
