= Tantilla calamarina =

Conservation status
- Least Concern (IUCN 3.1)

Scientific classification
- Kingdom: Animalia
- Phylum: Chordata
- Class: Reptilia
- Order: Squamata
- Suborder: Serpentes
- Family: Colubridae
- Genus: Tantilla
- Species: T. calamarina

Binomial name
- Tantilla calamarina Cope, 1866

Synonyms
- Tantilla gracilis calamarina Cope, 1866; Homalocranium calamarinum (Cope, 1866); Tantilla bimaculata Cope, 1876; Homalocranium bimaculatum (Cope, 1876); Tantilla martindelcampoi Taylor, 1937; Geophis gertschi Bogert & Porter, 1966

Species of snake

Tantilla calamarina, also known commonly as the Pacific Coast centipede snake and la culebra centipedívora in Mexican Spanish, is a species of snake in the subfamily Colubrinae of the family Colubridae. The species is endemic to Mexico.

== Geographic range ==
Tantilla calamarina is found in western central Mexico, in the Mexican states of Colima, Guerrero, Jalisco, Michoacán, Morelos, Nayarit, Puebla, and Sinaloa.

== Habitat ==
The preferred natural habitat of Tantilla calamarina is forest.

== Reproduction ==
Tantilla calamarina is oviparous.

== Etymology ==
The specific name of a synonym, martindelcampoi, is in honor of Mexican herpetologist Rafael Martín del Campo.

== Taxonomy ==
Tantilla calamarina is a member of the Tantilla calamarina species group, which also includes T. carolina, T. cascadae, T. ceboruca, T. coronadoi, T. deppei, T. sertula, and T. vermiformis.
