= Peten centipede snake =

There are two species of snake named Peten centipede snake:

- Tantilla cuniculator
- Tantilla hendersoni
