= Tantilla berguidoi =

Scientific classification
- Kingdom: Animalia
- Phylum: Chordata
- Class: Reptilia
- Order: Squamata
- Suborder: Serpentes
- Family: Colubridae
- Genus: Tantilla
- Species: T. berguidoi

Binomial name
- Tantilla berguidoi Batista, Mebert, Lotzkat & Wilson, 2016

Species of snake

Tantilla berguidoi, also known commonly as the Chucantí centipede snake and la centipedívora de Chucantí in Spanish, is a species of snake in the subfamily Colubrinae of the family Colubridae. The species is endemic to Panama.

== Etymology ==
The specific name, berguidoi, is in honor of biologist Guido Berguido, founder of the Adopt Panama Rainforest Association (ADOPTA).

== Description ==
Dorsally, Tantilla berguidoi is striped with light brown and dark brown, and it has a pale nuchal collar.

== Geographic range ==
Tantilla berguidoi is found in extreme eastern Panama, in Darién Province.

== Habitat ==
The preferred natural habitat of Tantilla berguidoi is premontane forest.

== Reproduction ==
Tantilla berguidoi is oviparous.

== Conservation status ==
Tantilla berguidoi is considered to be "Critically Endangered".

== Taxonomy ==
Tantilla berguidoi is a member of the T. reticulata section of the T. taeniata species group.
