= Three-lined centipede snake =

There are two species of snake named three-lined centipede snake:

- Tantilla trilineata
- Tantilla triseriata
