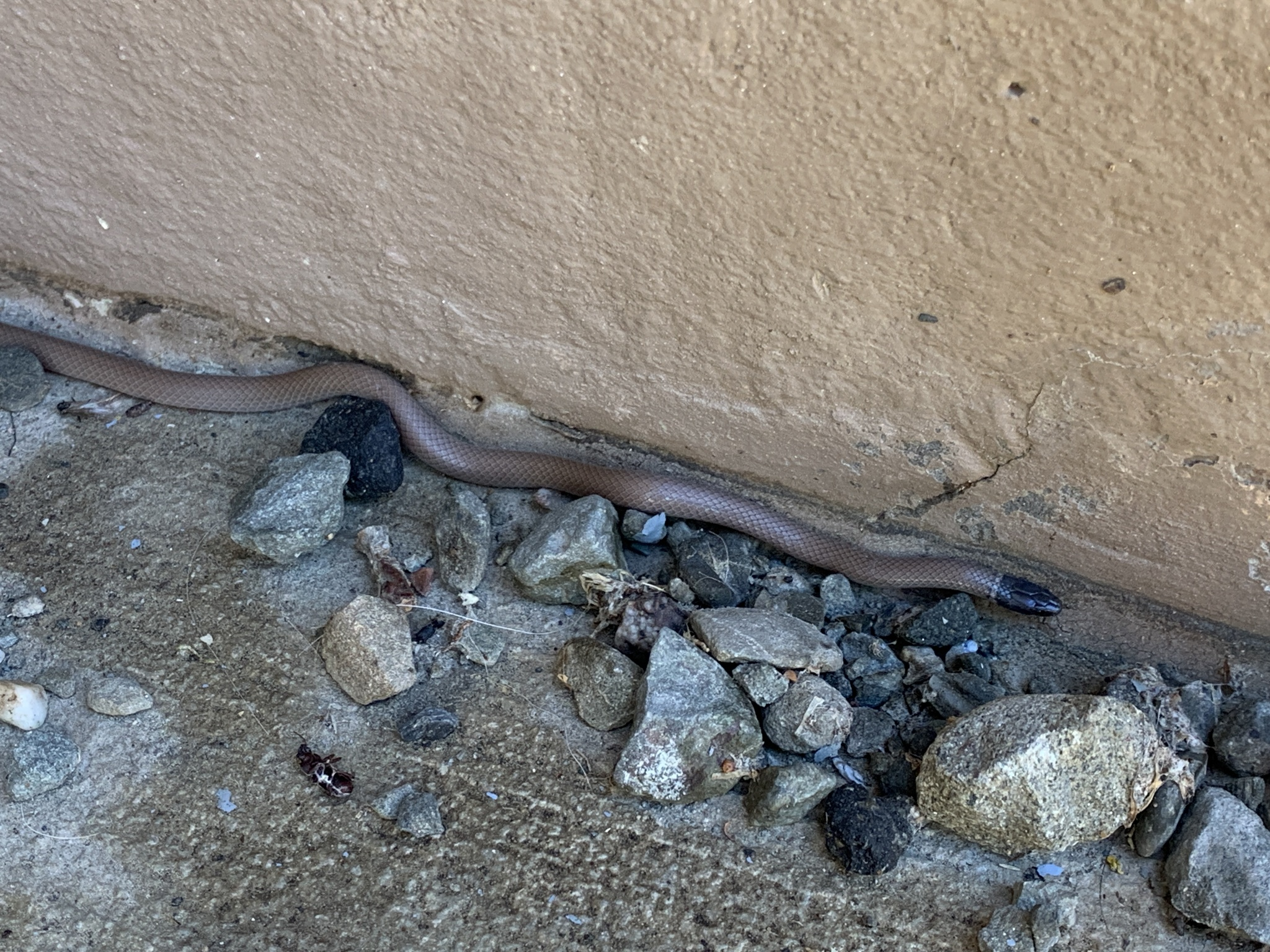

Conservation status
- Least Concern (IUCN 3.1)

Scientific classification
- Domain: Eukaryota
- Kingdom: Animalia
- Phylum: Chordata
- Class: Reptilia
- Order: Squamata
- Suborder: Serpentes
- Family: Colubridae
- Genus: Tantilla
- Species: T. planiceps

Binomial name
- Tantilla planiceps (Blainville, 1835)

= Western black-headed snake =

Species of snake

The western black-headed snake (Tantilla planiceps), also known as the California black-headed snake, is a snake species endemic to the Californias (the U.S. State of California and the Baja California Peninsula in Mexico), as north as the San Francisco Bay and as far east as western Utah, and Texas. It lives in mostly moist pockets in mostly arid or semiarid environments and spends much of its life underground. It has a flattened head as most crevice-dwellers and is seven to fifteen inches in size. It is brown, slender, olive-gray, with a black head bordered by a white collar. Its habitat is often in woodland, desert areas, grassland and along arroyos in areas that are wet in a usually dry region.

The western black-headed snake is a member of a larger natural group of small New World terrestrial colubrids, where some of the related species include sand snake (Chilomeniscus), shovel-nosed snake (Chionactis), and the ground snake (Sonora). The western black-headed snake is the sister species of Tantilla yaquia of southern Arizona. They are also related to Tantilla gracilis, Tantilla atriceps, Tantilla hobartsmithi and Tantilla nigriceps, all species endemic to the southwestern United States. It is visually similar to the southwestern black-headed snake (T. hobartsmithi). Although they usually appear singly or in pairs, as many as six individual snakes have been observed together. They prey on arthropods, particularly centipedes and beetle larvae, as well as spiders, insects, slugs, and earthworms. They are highly secretive and rarely seen, spending much time under objects, especially during daytime.
