= Tantilla tayrae =

Conservation status
- Data Deficient (IUCN 3.1)

Scientific classification
- Kingdom: Animalia
- Phylum: Chordata
- Class: Reptilia
- Order: Squamata
- Suborder: Serpentes
- Family: Colubridae
- Genus: Tantilla
- Species: T. tayrae

Binomial name
- Tantilla tayrae Wilson, 1983

Species of snake

Tantilla tayrae, also known commonly as the Volcán Tacaná centipede snake and la culebra centipedívora de Tacaná in Mexican Spanish, is a species of snake in the subfamily Colubrinae of the family Colubridae. The species is endemic to Mexico.

== Etymology ==
The specific name, tayrae, is in honor of Tayra Barbara Wilson, the daughter of binomial authority Larry David Wilson.

== Description ==
Dorsally, Tantilla tayrae is dark brown, without distinct striping. It has a pale nuchal collar.

== Geographic distribution ==
Tantilla tayrae is found in southernmost Mexico, in the Mexican state of Chiapas.

== Habitat ==
The preferred natural habitat of Tantilla tayrae is forest, but it has been found in coffee plantations with shade trees, at altitudes of 760–960 m (2,490–3,150 ft).

== Reproduction ==
Tantilla tayrae is oviparous.
