= Tantilla schistosa =

Conservation status
- Least Concern (IUCN 3.1)

Scientific classification
- Kingdom: Animalia
- Phylum: Chordata
- Class: Reptilia
- Order: Squamata
- Suborder: Serpentes
- Family: Colubridae
- Genus: Tantilla
- Species: T. schistosa

Binomial name
- Tantilla schistosa (Bocourt, 1883)

Species of snake

Tantilla schistosa, the red Earth centipede snake, is a species of snake of the family Colubridae.

The snake is found in Mexico, Belize, Guatemala, Honduras, Nicaragua, Costa Rica, and Panama.
