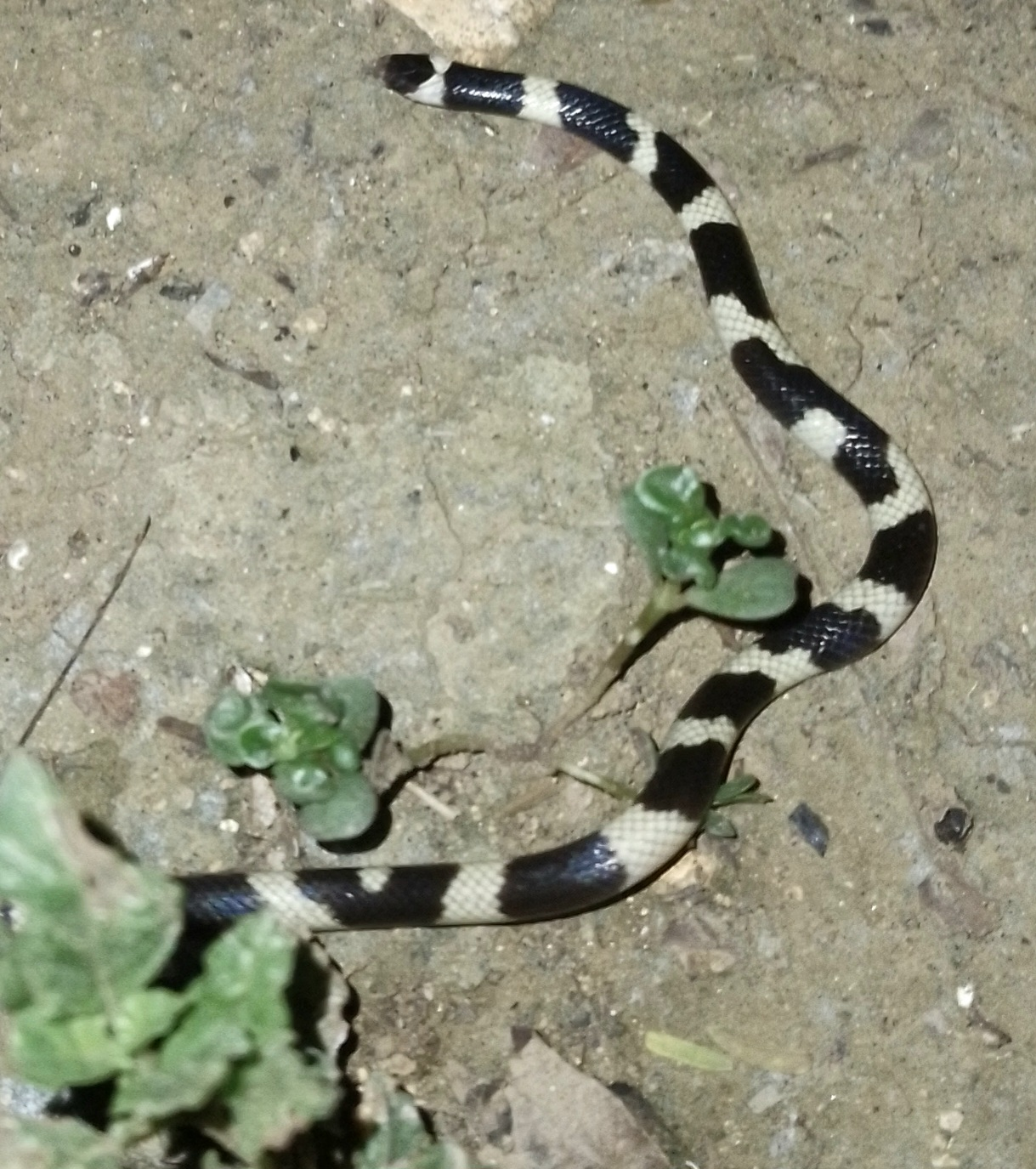

Conservation status
- Least Concern (IUCN 3.1)

Scientific classification
- Kingdom: Animalia
- Phylum: Chordata
- Class: Reptilia
- Order: Squamata
- Suborder: Serpentes
- Family: Colubridae
- Genus: Tantilla
- Species: T. semicincta

Binomial name
- Tantilla semicincta (A.M.C. Duméril, Bibron & A.H.A. Duméril, 1854)

= Tantilla semicincta =

Species of snake

Tantilla semicincta, the ringed centipede snake, is a species of snake of the family Colubridae.

The snake is found in Colombia and Venezuela.
