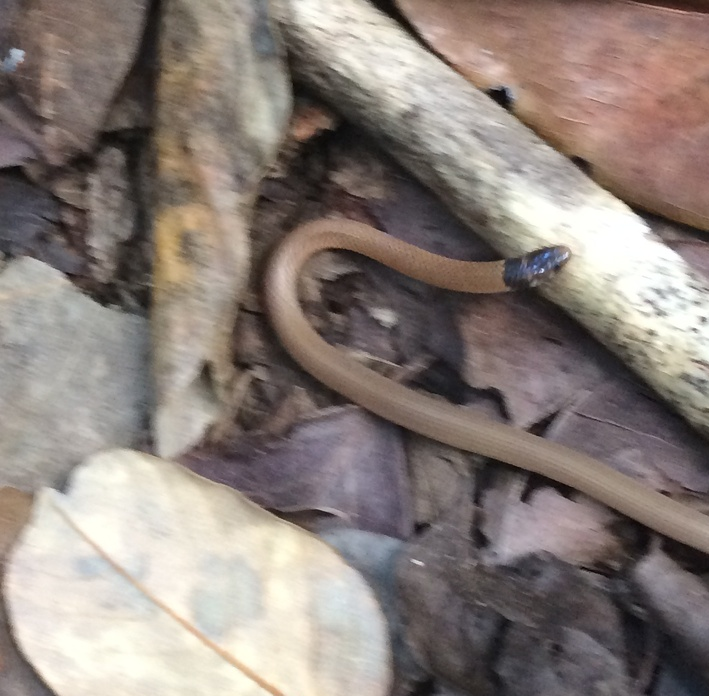

Conservation status
- Endangered (IUCN 3.1)

- Critically Imperiled (NatureServe)

Scientific classification
- Kingdom: Animalia
- Phylum: Chordata
- Class: Reptilia
- Order: Squamata
- Suborder: Serpentes
- Family: Colubridae
- Genus: Tantilla
- Species: T. oolitica

Binomial name
- Tantilla oolitica Telford, 1966

= Rim rock crown snake =

Rim rock crowned snake

Species of snake

The rim rock crowned snake (Tantilla oolitica), named after the Miami Rim Rock land arrangement, is a non-venomous endangered species of snake belonging to the family Colubridae. The rim rock crowned snake is endemic to the United States throughout southern Florida. The specific name, oolitica, refers to the oolitic limestone area of Florida in which the species is found. All species of snakes that belong to the genus Tantilla, are relatively small and usually do not exceed 20 cm (8 in). The species T. oolitica was added to the IUCN Red List in 2007 as a result of loss in habitat and restricted range.

== Geographic range ==
T. oolitica is found in Dade County and Monroe County of Florida and the Florida Keys, including Eastern Rock Rim of Miami.

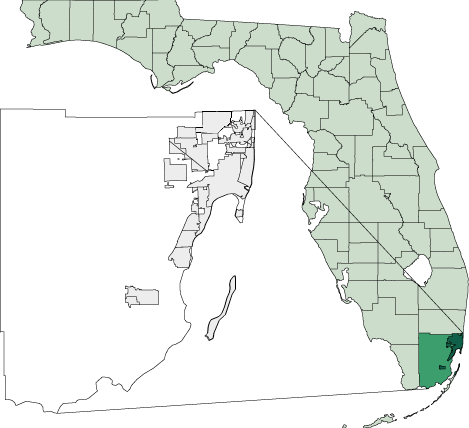
Map of Miami's Dade county highlighted in green

== Description ==
The rim rock crowned snake is a relatively small species. The maximum recorded total length (including tail) is 29 cm (11.5 in). The top of the head is black. The body is tan to beige dorsally, and white ventrally.

== Diet ==
T. oolitica preys upon spiders, centipedes, worms, insects and their larvae, and even scorpions. At least 1 mortality from consuming centipedes has been reported.

== Reproduction ==
T. oolitica is oviparous. Clutch size is small, only one to three eggs (Behler & King, 1979).

== Habitat ==
The rim rock crowned snake tends to inhabit areas with rocky and sandy soils in pine flatwoods, and tropical hardwood hammocks. The snake can less commonly be found inside crevices of limestone, under foliage, and in suburban areas.

== Conservation status ==
In 2007 the species T. oolitica was added to the IUCN Red List, as a result of loss in habitat and restricted range. Due to Miami's ever growing city, fragmentation is the main threat to the rim rock crowned snake. Roughly 2% of the historical pine rocklands located on the Miami rock ridge still exist. Also the hardwood hammocks in Dade county and the remainder of Florida have been diminished to about half of what they once were. Populations near the Keys also face major issues concerning habitat flooding from severe storms. Today the species is under the Florida endangered and threatened species rule.
