= Tantilla olympia =

Scientific classification
- Kingdom: Animalia
- Phylum: Chordata
- Class: Reptilia
- Order: Squamata
- Suborder: Serpentes
- Family: Colubridae
- Genus: Tantilla
- Species: T. olympia

Binomial name
- Tantilla olympia Townsend, Wilson, Medina-Flores & Herrera, 2013

Species of snake

Tantilla olympia is a species of snake of the family Colubridae.

The snake is found in Honduras.
