= Tantilla lydia =

Scientific classification
- Kingdom: Animalia
- Phylum: Chordata
- Class: Reptilia
- Order: Squamata
- Suborder: Serpentes
- Family: Colubridae
- Genus: Tantilla
- Species: T. lydia

Binomial name
- Tantilla lydia Antúnez-Fonseca, Castro, España, Townsend & Wilson, 2020

Species of snake

Tantilla lydia is a species of snake in the subfamily Colubrinae of the family Colubridae. The species is endemic to Honduras.

== Etymology ==
The specific name, lydia, is in honor of Australian herpetologist Lydia Allison Fucsko.

== Geographic distribution ==
Tantilla lydia is found in northern Honduras, in Atlántida Department.
