= Tantilla insulamontana =

Conservation status
- Critically Endangered (IUCN 3.1)

Scientific classification
- Kingdom: Animalia
- Phylum: Chordata
- Class: Reptilia
- Order: Squamata
- Suborder: Serpentes
- Family: Colubridae
- Genus: Tantilla
- Species: T. insulamontana

Binomial name
- Tantilla insulamontana Wilson & Mena, 1980

Species of snake

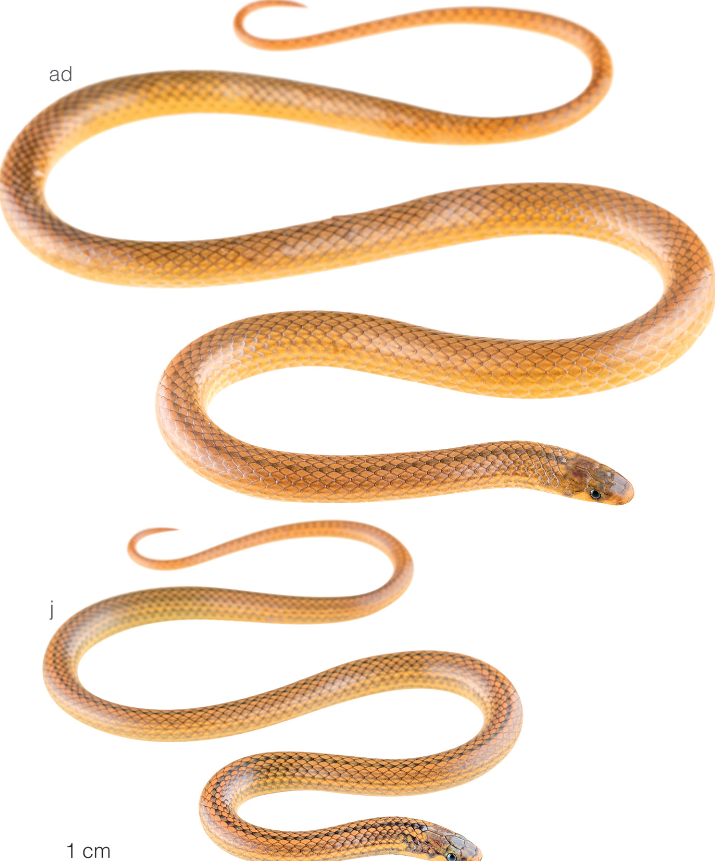
Juvenile and adult mountain centipede snake

Tantilla insulamontana, the mountain centipede snake, is a species of snake of the family Colubridae. The snake is found only in Ecuador. It is known as a critically endangered species but new data suggests there are improvements and they may now be considered endangered.

== Distribution and habitat ==
The distribution of this species is endemic to a small portion of southern Ecuador that is estimated to be about 1,069 km^{2} area that is located in the xeric inter-Andean valley. As of now, the Mountain Centipede-Snake has only been found in three provinces: El Oro, Loja, and Azuay. The altitudinal zonation is western subtropical and western temperate. The altitude range is 1250–2100 meters above sea level.

Although rarely seen, these snakes have been seen during the months of December through April which constitutes Ecuador's rainy season.

== Anatomy and morphology ==
It has been reported that the total length from the snout to the tip of the tail is a total length of 40 cm. Females have an average length of 40.4 cm while males max out at about 24.9 cm. The tail averages 25% of the body length.

Characteristics that present themselves is there is being a dark head cap and a pale lateral stripe. There are 59 to 65 subcaudal scales as well as 144 to 157 ventral's. Juveniles are slightly darker than the adult.

== Etymology ==
The family of snakes known as Colubridae are small bodied snakes and is where the Latin genus name, "Tantilla" is derived from, meaning "small". The species name, "insulamontana" which references insula meaning "island" and montis meaning "mountain".

== Diet ==
There is no published information about the diet but it is suggested they prey on centipedes as do other members of the genus.

== Conservation ==
Once considered critically endangered when assessed in 2014, new data suggests that the mountain centipede snake has made a small comeback and is now endangered.

This snake has been impacted heavily by humans. Agriculture, the expansion of infrastructure, and livestock grazing are some of the main setbacks for this species that have caused them to be listed as Endangered.
