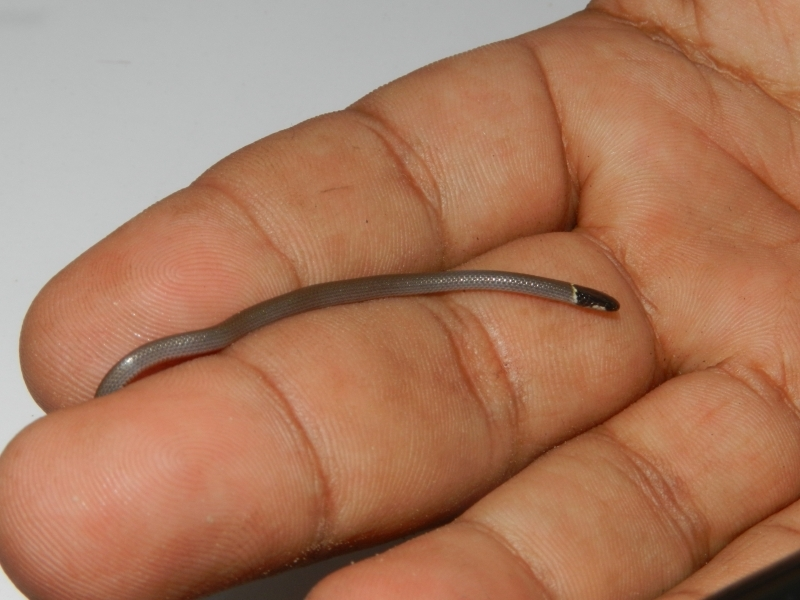

Conservation status
- Least Concern (IUCN 3.1)

Scientific classification
- Kingdom: Animalia
- Phylum: Chordata
- Class: Reptilia
- Order: Squamata
- Suborder: Serpentes
- Family: Colubridae
- Genus: Tantilla
- Species: T. yaquia

Binomial name
- Tantilla yaquia H.M. Smith, 1942
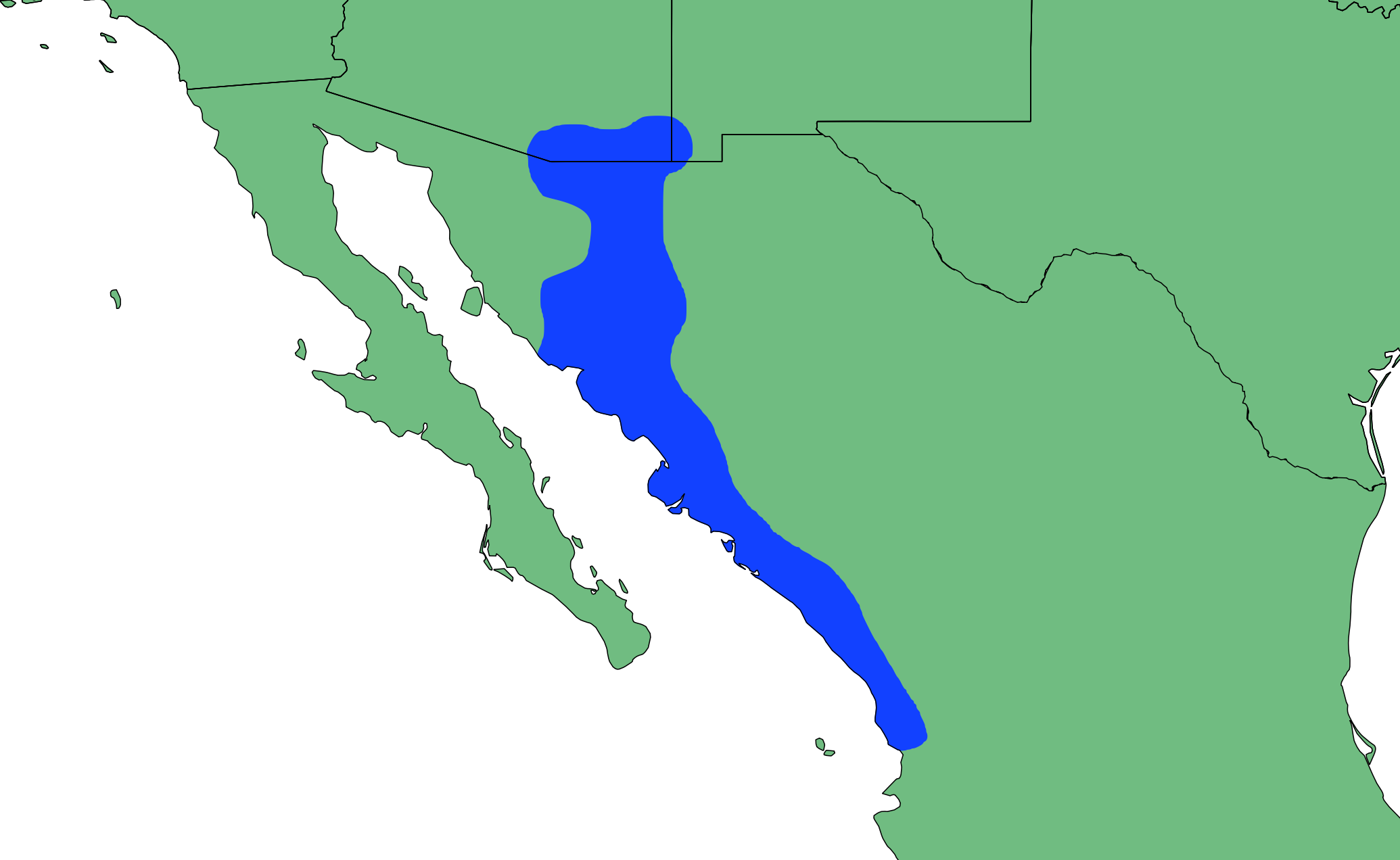

= Tantilla yaquia =

Species of snake

Tantilla yaquia, the Yaquia blackhead snake, is a species of snake of the family Colubridae.

The snake is found in the United States and Mexico.
