= Tantilla vulcani =

Conservation status
- Least Concern (IUCN 3.1)

Scientific classification
- Kingdom: Animalia
- Phylum: Chordata
- Class: Reptilia
- Order: Squamata
- Suborder: Serpentes
- Family: Colubridae
- Genus: Tantilla
- Species: T. vulcani

Binomial name
- Tantilla vulcani Campbell, 1998

Species of snake

Tantilla vulcani, the Vulcan centipede snake, is a species of snake of the family Colubridae.

The snake is found in Guatemala and Mexico.
