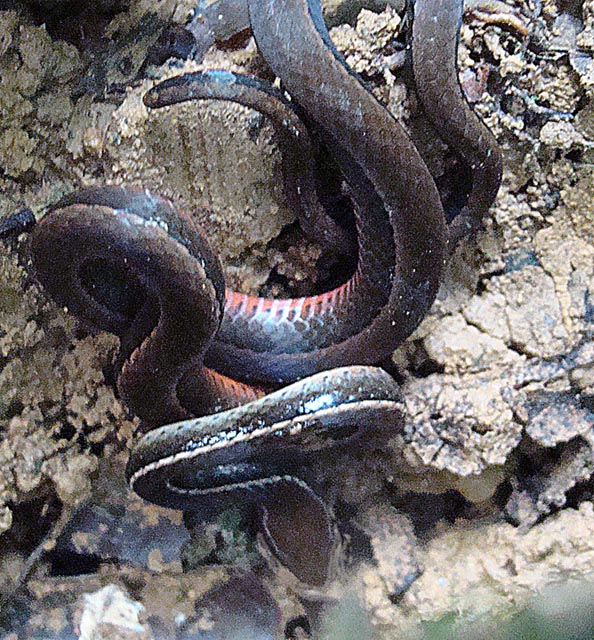

Conservation status
- Least Concern (IUCN 3.1)

Scientific classification
- Kingdom: Animalia
- Phylum: Chordata
- Class: Reptilia
- Order: Squamata
- Suborder: Serpentes
- Family: Colubridae
- Genus: Tantilla
- Species: T. alticola

Binomial name
- Tantilla alticola (Boulenger, 1903)

= Tantilla alticola =

Species of snake

Tantilla alticola, Boulenger's centipede snake, is a species of snake of the family Colubridae.

The snake is found in Nicaragua, Costa Rica, Panama, Colombia, and Ecuador.
