= Tantilla shawi =

Conservation status
- Endangered (IUCN 3.1)

Scientific classification
- Kingdom: Animalia
- Phylum: Chordata
- Class: Reptilia
- Order: Squamata
- Suborder: Serpentes
- Family: Colubridae
- Genus: Tantilla
- Species: T. shawi

Binomial name
- Tantilla shawi Taylor, 1949

Species of snake

Tantilla shawi, also known commonly as the Potosí centipede snake and la culebra centipedívora de San Luis Potosí in Mexican Spanish, is a species of snake in the subfamily Colubrinae of the family Colubridae. The species is endemic to Mexico.

== Etymology ==
The specific name, shawi, is in honor of American zoologist Charles R. Shaw who collected the holotype.

== Geographic distribution ==
Tantilla shawi is found in eastern Mexico, in the states of San Luis Potosí and Veracruz.

== Habitat ==
The preferred natural habitat of Tantilla shawi is forest, at altitudes around 1,372 m (4,501 ft).

== Reproduction ==
Tantilla shawi is oviparous.
