= Tantilla impensa =

Conservation status
- Least Concern (IUCN 3.1)

Scientific classification
- Kingdom: Animalia
- Phylum: Chordata
- Class: Reptilia
- Order: Squamata
- Suborder: Serpentes
- Family: Colubridae
- Genus: Tantilla
- Species: T. impensa

Binomial name
- Tantilla impensa Campbell, 1998

Species of snake

Tantilla impensa, the greater centipede snake, is a non venomous species of snake of the family Colubridae. The species was first described by Jonathan A. Campbell in 1998.

== Distribution and habitat ==
Tantilla impensa is found in Guatemala, Honduras, and Mexico in low to moderate elevations. They have been observed residing in leaf litter and decomposed logs in tropical and subtropical forests.

== Description ==
Tantilla impensa are brown and gray in coloration with pale lateral and mid-dorsal stripes through the center of the body and around the head. These stripes differentiate the species from others in genus Tantilla. Tantilla impensa are considered the largest species in genus Tantilla, with some measured specimens being approximately 2 feet long.

=== Etymology ===
Species name 'impensa' is derived from the Latin term 'impensus', translating to "great" or "large", referencing the snake's larger size relative to others in the genus.

=== Reproduction ===
Tantilla impensa display oviparous reproduction.
