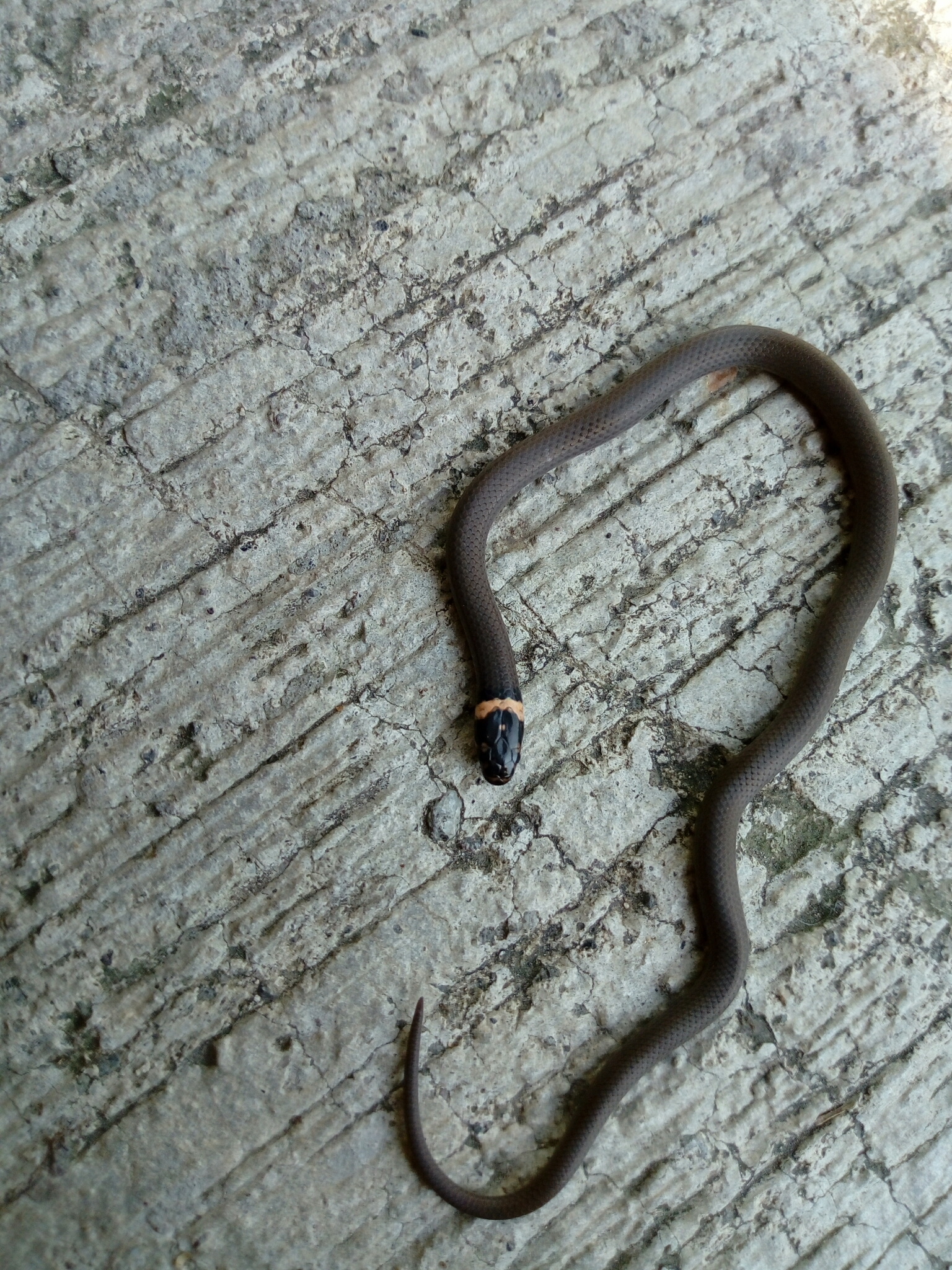

Conservation status
- Least Concern (IUCN 3.1)

Scientific classification
- Kingdom: Animalia
- Phylum: Chordata
- Class: Reptilia
- Order: Squamata
- Suborder: Serpentes
- Family: Colubridae
- Genus: Tantilla
- Species: T. bocourti

Binomial name
- Tantilla bocourti (Günther, 1895)

Synonyms
- Homalocranium bocourti Günther, 1895; Homalocranion bocourti (Günther, 1895)

= Tantilla bocourti =

Species of snake

Tantilla bocourti, also known commonly as Bocourt's black-headed snake and la serpiente de cabeza negra de Bocourt in Mexican Spanish, is a species of snake in the subfamily Colubrinae of the family Colubridae. The species is endemic to Mexico.

== Etymology ==
The specific name, bocourti, is in honor of French zoologist Marie Firmin Bocourt.

== Description ==
A small snake, the holotype of Tantilla bocourti has a total length of 24.5 cm (9.6 in), which includes a tail 5 cm (2.0 in) long. It has the following coloration in alcohol. Dorsally, it is pale reddish, without spots or markings. The head is black, with a yellowish crossbar on the snout and a yellowish, black-edged occipital crossbar (nuchal collar) just behind the parietals. Ventrally, the body is whitish, as is the upper lip.

== Geographic range ==
Tantilla bocourti is found in central Mexico, in the Mexican states of Aguascalientes, Colima, Durango, Guanajuato, Guerrero, Hidalgo, Jalisco, Michoacán, Morelos, Nayarit, Oaxaca, Puebla, Querétaro, San Luis Potosí, Sinaloa, Veracruz, and Zacatecas.

== Habitat ==
The preferred natural habitat of Tantilla bocourti is forest.

== Reproduction ==
Tantilla bocourti is oviparous.
