= Tantilla brevicauda =

Conservation status
- Least Concern (IUCN 3.1)

Scientific classification
- Kingdom: Animalia
- Phylum: Chordata
- Class: Reptilia
- Order: Squamata
- Suborder: Serpentes
- Family: Colubridae
- Genus: Tantilla
- Species: T. brevicauda

Binomial name
- Tantilla brevicauda Mertens, 1952

Species of snake

Tantilla brevicauda, Mertens's centipede snake, a species of snake of the family Colubridae.

The snake is found in El Salvador and Guatemala.
