= Tantilla moesta =

Conservation status
- Least Concern (IUCN 3.1)

Scientific classification
- Kingdom: Animalia
- Phylum: Chordata
- Class: Reptilia
- Order: Squamata
- Suborder: Serpentes
- Family: Colubridae
- Genus: Tantilla
- Species: T. moesta

Binomial name
- Tantilla moesta (Günther, 1863)

Species of snake

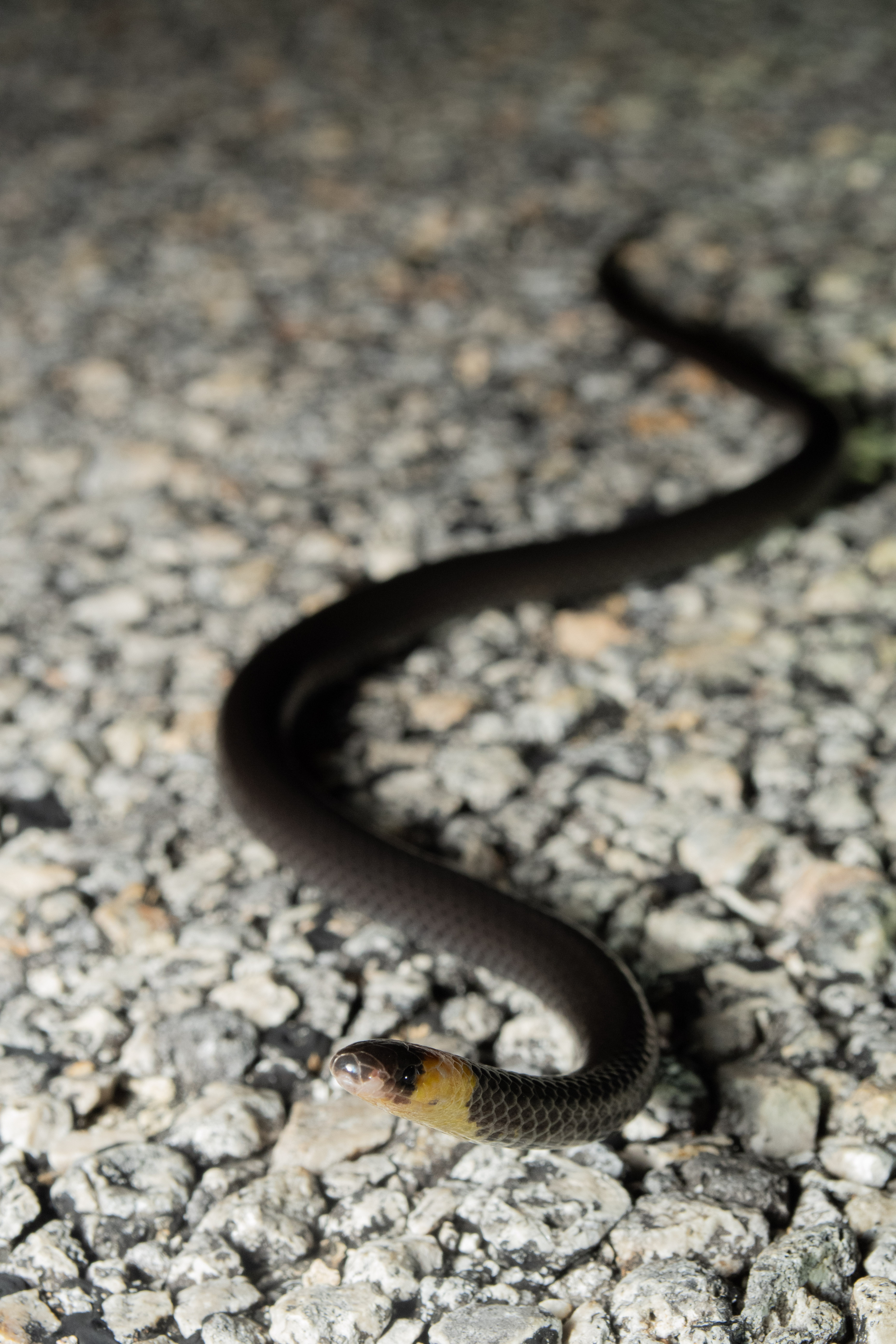
Tantilla moesta, Yucatán, MX. 2025.

Tantilla moesta, the blackbelly centipede snake, a species of snake of the family Colubridae.

The snake is found in Mexico and Guatemala.
