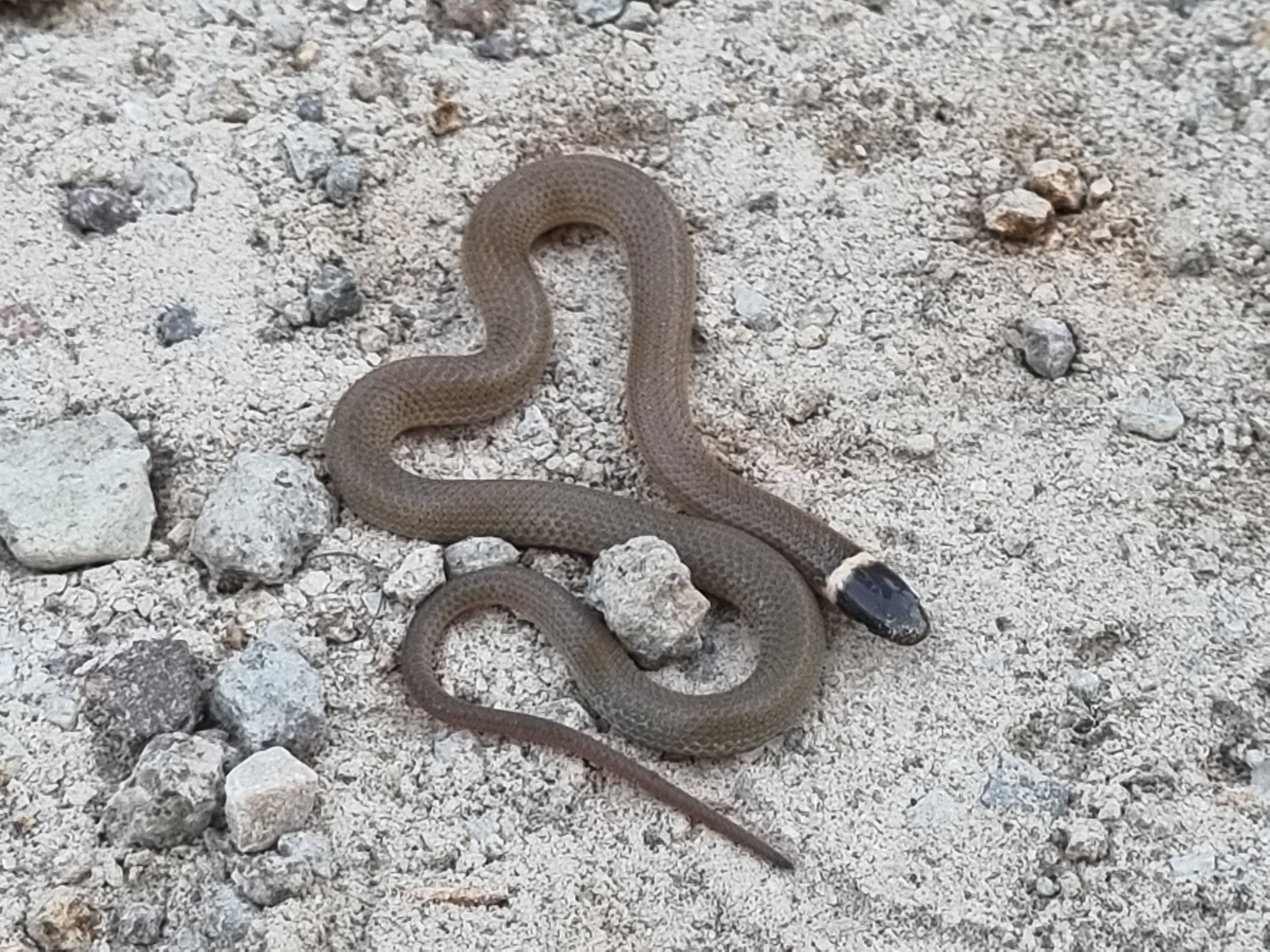

Conservation status
- Least Concern (IUCN 3.1)

Scientific classification
- Kingdom: Animalia
- Phylum: Chordata
- Class: Reptilia
- Order: Squamata
- Suborder: Serpentes
- Family: Colubridae
- Genus: Tantilla
- Species: T. wilcoxi

Binomial name
- Tantilla wilcoxi Stejneger, 1902
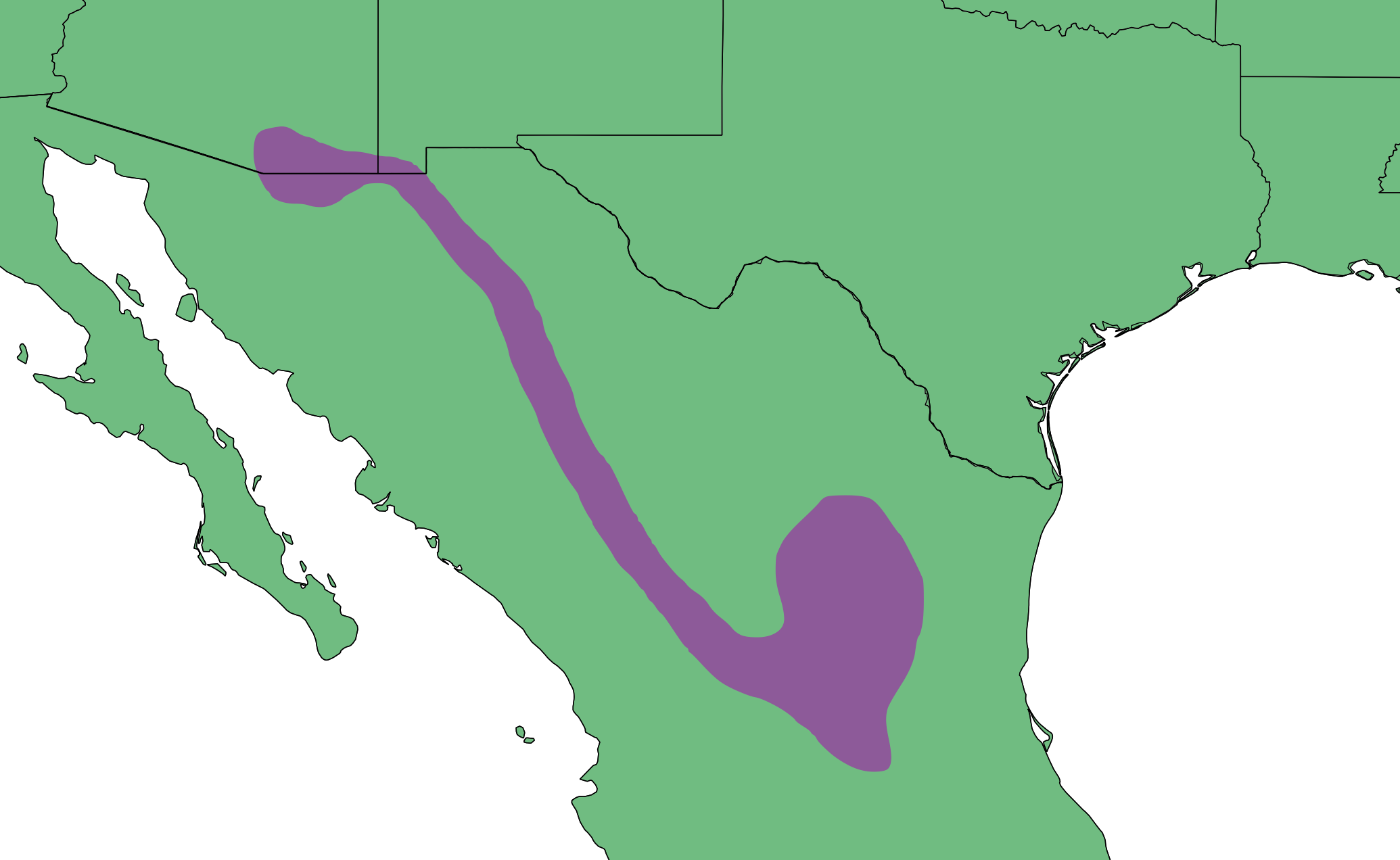

Synonyms
- Tantilla deviatrix Barbour, 1916; Tantilla bocourti deviatrix Barbour 1916; Tantilla wilcoxi rubricata H.M. Smith, 1942

= Tantilla wilcoxi =

Species of snake

Tantilla wilcoxi, also known commonly as the Chihuahuan blackhead snake and la centipedívora de Chihuahua in Mexican Spanish, is a species of snake in the subfamily Colubrinae of the family Colubridae. The species is Native to the southwestern United States and adjacent northern Mexico.

== Etymology ==
The specific name, wilcoxi, is in honor of United States Army surgeon Timothy Erastus Wilcox (1840–1932), who collected the holotype.

== Common names ==
Additional common names for Tantilla wilcoxi include Arizona black-headed snake, Arizona tantilla, Huachuca black-headed snake, and Wilcox's black-headed snake.

== Description ==
Tantilla wilcoxi may attain a total length (tail included) of 14 in (36 cm). Dorsally, the head is black, followed by a broad white nuchal collar which includes the posterior tips of the parietals, and the body is brown. The smooth dorsal scales are arranged in 15 rows, and the anal plate is divided.

== Geographic distribution ==
In the United States Tantilla wilcoxi is found in southeastern Arizona and southwestern New Mexico. In Mexico it is found in southeastern Aguascalientes, Chihuahua, Coahuila, central Durango, Jalisco, Nuevo León, northeastern Sinaloa, Sonora, Tamaulipas, and Zacatecas.

== Habitat ==
The preferred natural habitats of Tantilla wilcoxi are forest, shrubland, and desert, at altitudes of 914–2,438 meters (3,000–8,000 feet).

== Behavior ==
Tantilla wilcoxi is terrestrial, and shelters under dead plant material, fallen logs, and rocks.

== Reproduction ==
Tantilla wilcoxi is oviparous.
