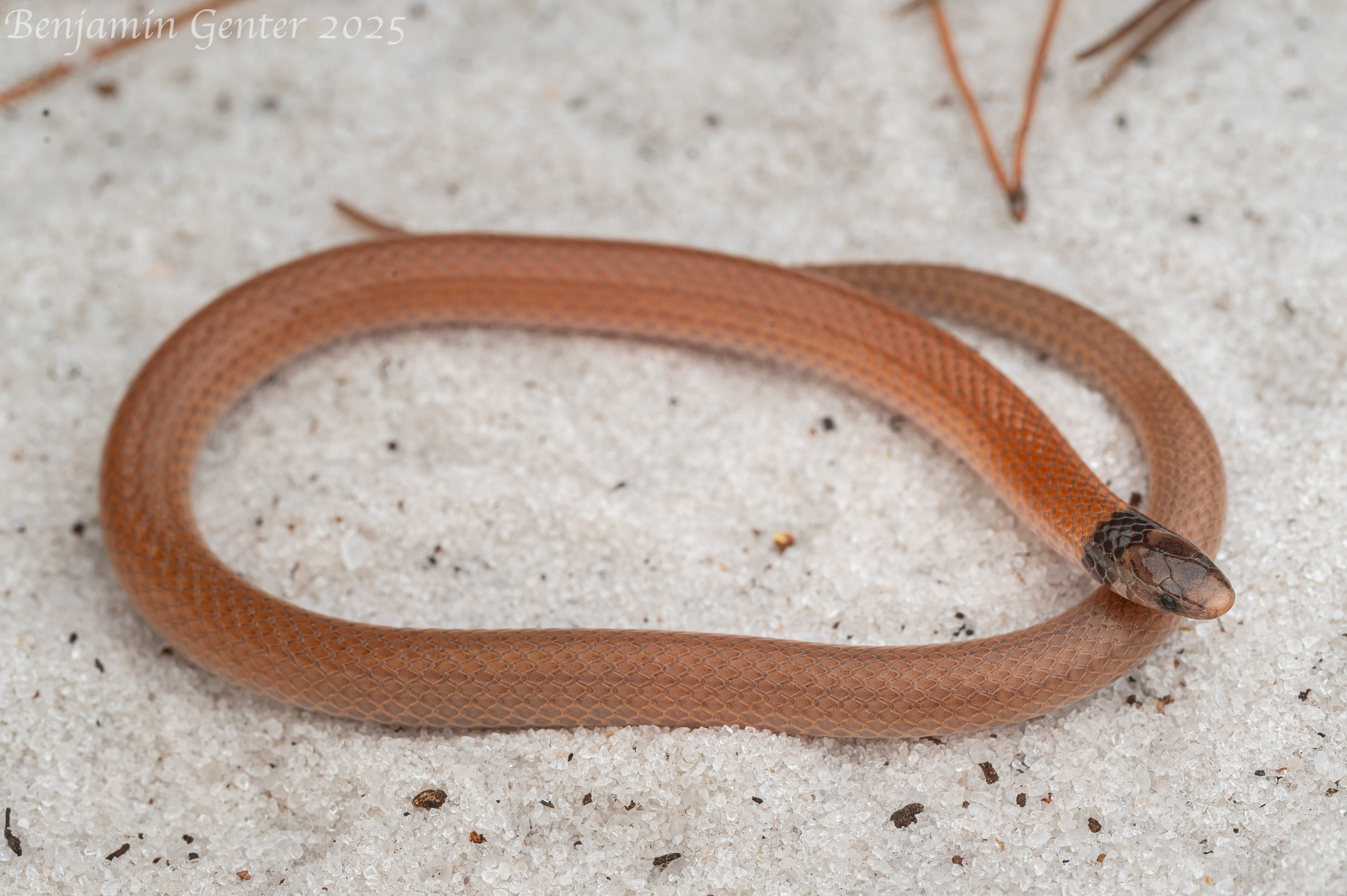
- Coastal dunes crowned snake (Tantilla relicta pamlica)

Conservation status
- Least Concern (IUCN 3.1)

Scientific classification
- Kingdom: Animalia
- Phylum: Chordata
- Class: Reptilia
- Order: Squamata
- Suborder: Serpentes
- Family: Colubridae
- Genus: Tantilla
- Species: T. relicta

Binomial name
- Tantilla relicta Telford, 1966
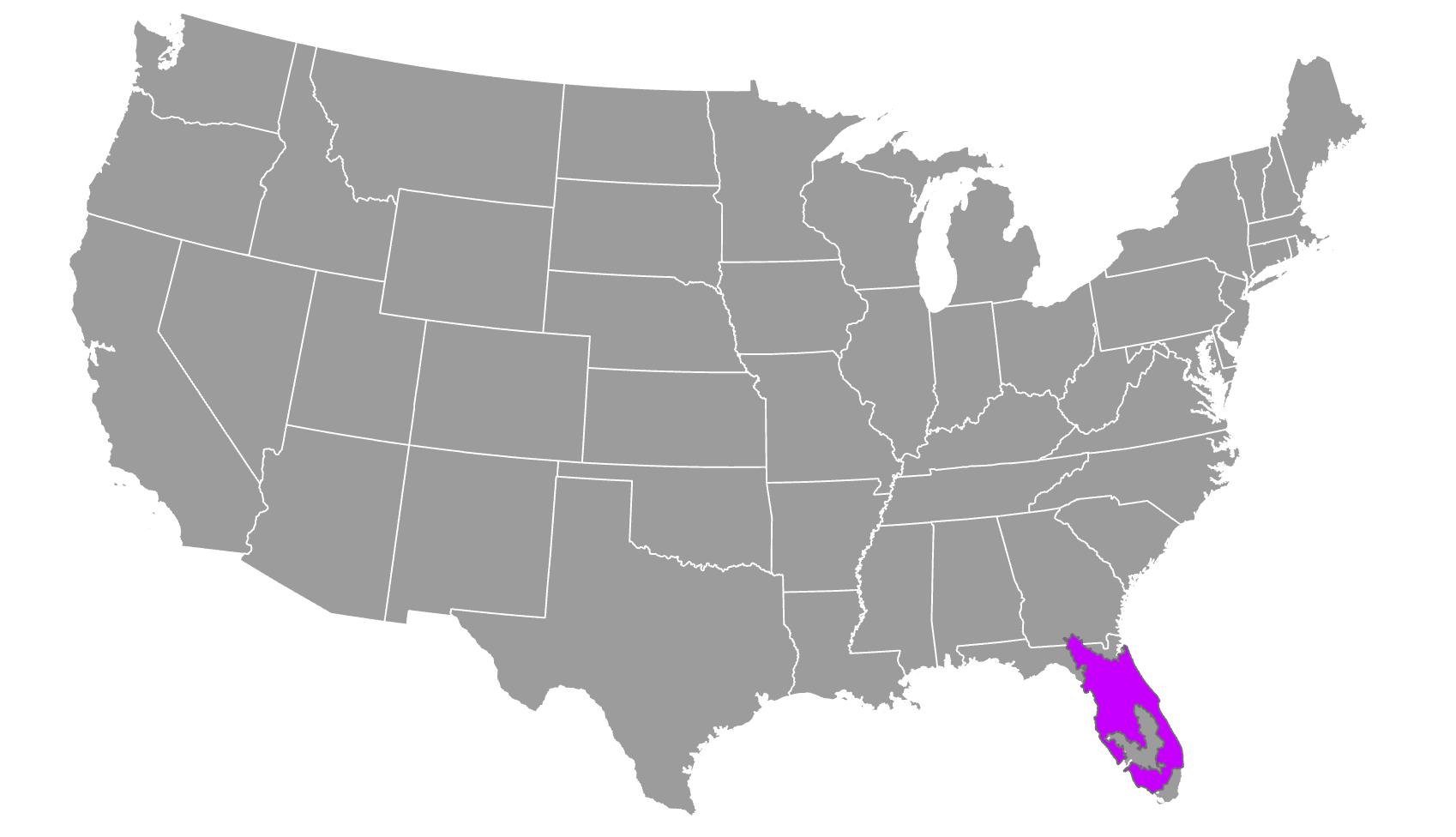
- Florida crowned snake range

= Florida crowned snake =

Species of snake

The Florida crowned snake (Tantilla relicta) is a species of snake in the subfamily Colubrinae of the family Colubridae. The species is native to peninsular Florida and extreme southern Georgia. It is a small, slender snake that is rarely seen, and is most often associated with sandy habitats. There are three recognized subspecies.

== Description ==
The Florida crowned snake is a small, slender snake. Adults are usually 7–9 inches (17–22 cm) in total length (tail included). Dorsally, the snake is tan, light brown or reddish brown in color. It has a brown-black head, chin, and parts of the neck. Some individuals have a pattern on the head of a pale band. The band marking may be absent in individuals from north-central Florida. It can also have a dark neck band. The underside can be white, pink or whitish-yellow. The maximum recorded total length (tail included) of the species is 24 cm (9.5 in). The nose may be cream-tan in color in populations found along the Atlantic Coast.

== Natural habitat ==
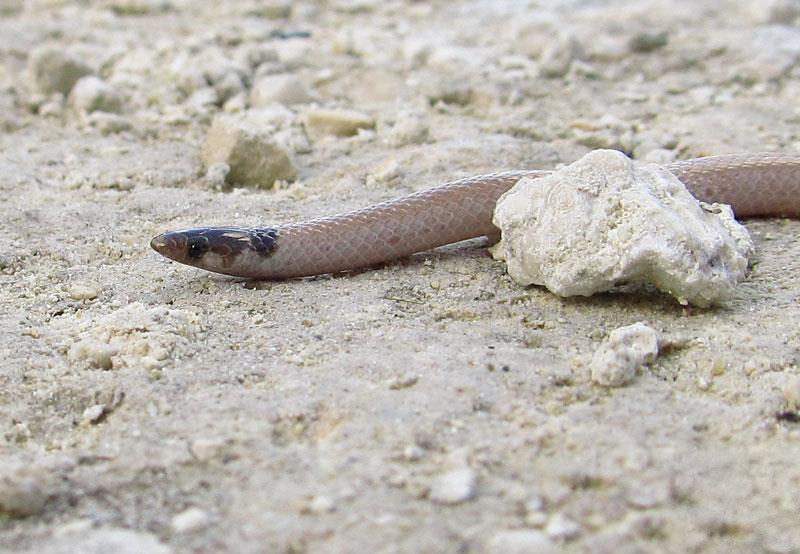
Florida crowned snake in central Florida.

The Florida crowned snake is commonly found in north and central Florida, and in sandy habitat areas of the Gulf coast. The species is seen rarely in the southernmost border area of Georgia. It is most often associated with sandy habitats, including Florida sand pine scrub, pine flatwoods and pine hammocks.

== Behavior and diet ==
The Florida crowned snake is most active in the warmest months of the year. During the winter, it spends the majority of its time burrowed in loose, sandy soils, including mounds created by burrowing animals. It also will hide under rocks or organic litter. It is rarely seen out in the open. It has been observed occupying pocket gopher and gopher tortoise burrows. Diet includes worms, snails, spiders, centipedes, and insects and their larvae. The snake has been observed eating beetle larvae. The populations found primarily in Florida have very large rear teeth that possibly direct venom into their prey. The species is harmless to humans.

== Reproduction ==
Very little is known about the reproduction of the Florida crowned snake. The species lays elongated eggs. It is believed that its reproduction is probably similar to other species in the genus Tantilla. It is assumed that a sexually mature female lays its eggs from late spring to August.

== Predators and defense ==
The Florida crowned snake is eaten by a large variety of predators which have the ability to find and apprehend the snake underground. The snake will not bite when it is picked up by humans. This species is the primary prey item for the rare short-tailed snake (Lampropeltis extenuata).

== Taxonomy and etymology ==
Three subspecies of Tantilla relicta are recognized as being valid, including the nominotypical subspecies. The subspecific name, neilli, is in honor of American herpetologist Wilfred T. Neill.

- Tantilla relicta neilli Telford, 1966
- Tantilla relicta pamlica Telford, 1966
- Tantilla relicta relicta Telford, 1966

== Conservation ==
The Florida crowned snake is not considered a conservation risk in Florida. Some populations of this species are threatened when their habitat is damaged or destroyed. It is listed as critically impaired in Georgia because of its small range in the state. This species is protected in the state of Georgia.
