= Tantilla tritaeniata =

Conservation status
- Critically Endangered (IUCN 3.1)

Scientific classification
- Kingdom: Animalia
- Phylum: Chordata
- Class: Reptilia
- Order: Squamata
- Suborder: Serpentes
- Family: Colubridae
- Genus: Tantilla
- Species: T. tritaeniata

Binomial name
- Tantilla tritaeniata Smith & Williams, 1966

Species of snake

Tantilla tritaeniata, commonly known as the three-banded centipede snake, is a species of small colubrid snake. The species is endemic to Guanaja Island of Honduras.
