= Tantilla slavensi =

Conservation status
- Data Deficient (IUCN 3.1)

Scientific classification
- Kingdom: Animalia
- Phylum: Chordata
- Class: Reptilia
- Order: Squamata
- Suborder: Serpentes
- Family: Colubridae
- Genus: Tantilla
- Species: T. slavensi

Binomial name
- Tantilla slavensi Pérez-Higareda, H.M. Smith & R.B. Smith, 1985

Species of snake

Tantilla slavensi, also known commonly as Slavens's centipede snake and la culebra centipedívora de Slavens in Mexican Spanish, is a species of snake in the subfamily Colubrinae of the family Colubridae. The species is endemic to Mexico

== Etymology ==
The specific name, slavensi, is in honor of American herpetologist Frank L. Slavens.

== Description ==
Dorsally, Tantilla slavensi has a pattern of light brown and dark brown stripes. Ventrally, it is orange, which fades to white in preservative. The dorsal scales, which are smooth and lack apical pits, are arranged in 15 rows throughout the length of the body. The holotype has a total length of 34.6 cm (13.6 in), which includes a tail length of 6.9 cm (2.7 in).

== Geographic distribution ==
Tantilla slavensi is found in eastern Mexico, in the Mexican state of Veracruz.

== Habitat ==
The preferred natural habitat of Tantilla slavensi is forest, at altitudes of 50–800 m (160–2,620 ft).

== Behavior ==
Tantilla slavensi is terrestrial and fossorial.

== Reproduction ==
Tantilla slavensi is oviparous.
