= Tantilla johnsoni =

Conservation status
- Data Deficient (IUCN 3.1)

Scientific classification
- Kingdom: Animalia
- Phylum: Chordata
- Class: Reptilia
- Order: Squamata
- Suborder: Serpentes
- Family: Colubridae
- Genus: Tantilla
- Species: T. johnsoni

Binomial name
- Tantilla johnsoni Wilson, Vaughn & Dixon, 1999

Species of snake

Tantilla johnsoni, also known commonly as Johnson's centipede snake and la culebra centipedívora de Chiapas in Mexican Spanish, is a species of snake in the subfamily Colubrinae of the family Colubridae. The species is endemic to Mexico.

== Etymology ==
The specific name, johnsoni, is in honor of American zoologist Jerry Douglas Johnson.

== Geographic range ==
Tantilla johnsoni is found in the Mexican state of Chiapas.

== Habitat ==
The preferred natural habitat of Tantilla johnsoni is forest.

== Behavior ==
Tantilla johnsoni is terrestrial.

== Reproduction ==
Tantilla johnsoni is oviparous.
