= Tantilla psittaca =

Conservation status
- Vulnerable (IUCN 3.1)

Scientific classification
- Kingdom: Animalia
- Phylum: Chordata
- Class: Reptilia
- Order: Squamata
- Suborder: Serpentes
- Family: Colubridae
- Genus: Tantilla
- Species: T. psittaca

Binomial name
- Tantilla psittaca McCranie, 2011

Species of snake

Tantilla psittaca is a species of snake of the family Colubridae.

The snake is found in Honduras.
