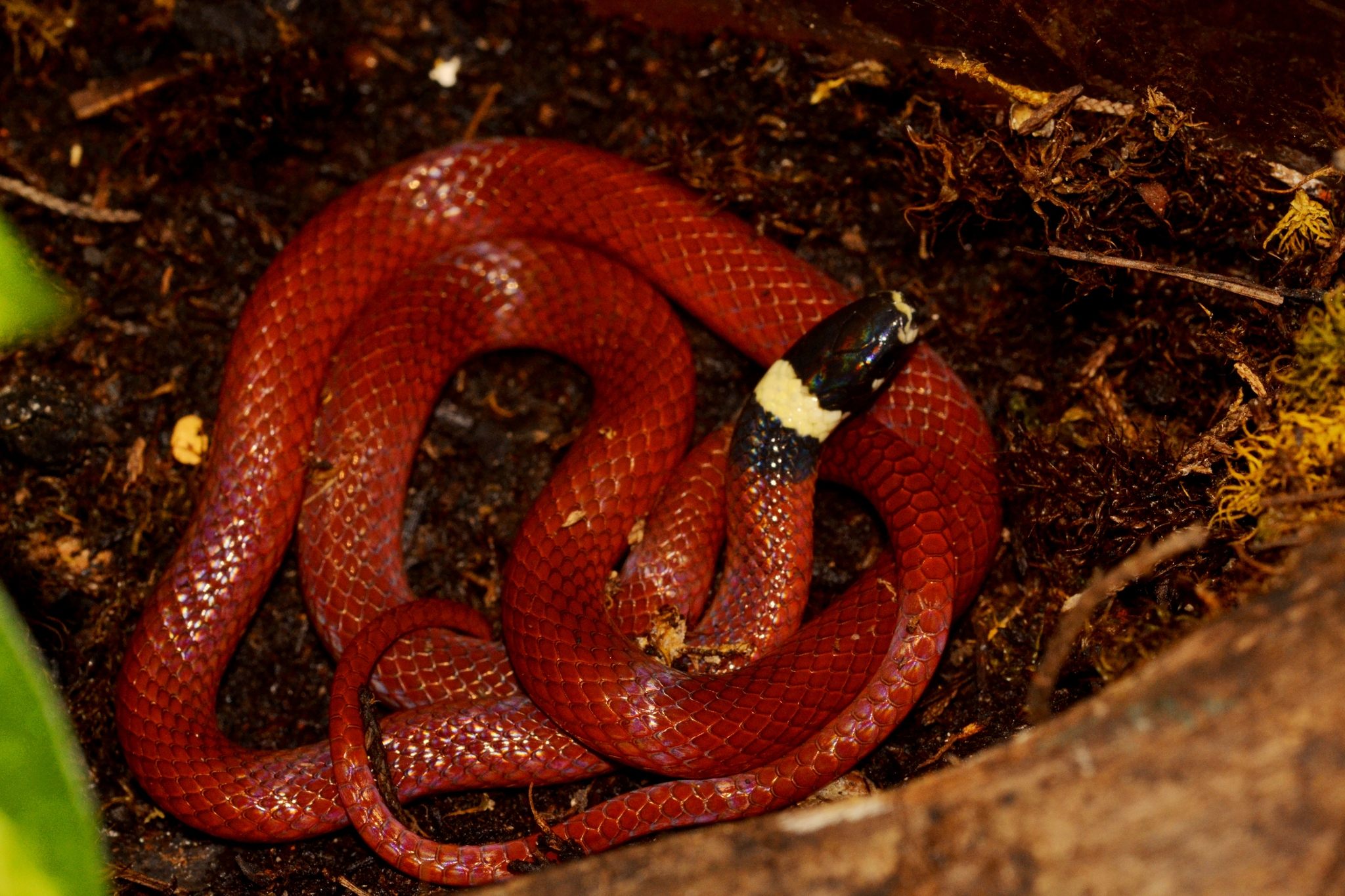

Conservation status
- Least Concern (IUCN 3.1)

Scientific classification
- Kingdom: Animalia
- Phylum: Chordata
- Class: Reptilia
- Order: Squamata
- Suborder: Serpentes
- Family: Colubridae
- Genus: Tantilla
- Species: T. rubra

Binomial name
- Tantilla rubra Cope, 1875

Synonyms
- Homalocranium rubrum (Cope, 1875); Homalocranion rubrum (Cope, 1875); Homalocranium boulengeri Günther, 1895; Tantilla morgani Hartweg, 1944

= Tantilla rubra =

Species of snake

Tantilla rubra, also known commonly as the red black-headed snake, the Big Bend black-headed snake, and la rojilla in Spanish, is a species of snake in the subfamily Colubrinae of the family Colubridae. The species is native to southern Mexico and western Guatemala.

== Geographic range ==
Tantilla rubra is found in the Mexican states of Chiapas, Guanajuato, Guerrero, Hidalgo, Nuevo León, Oaxaca, Puebla, Querétaro, San Luis Potosí, and Tamaulipas and in western Guatemala.

== Habitat ==
The preferred natural habitat of Tantilla rubra is forest, at altitudes from sea level to 2,618 m (8,589 ft).

== Behavior ==
Tantilla rubra is terrestrial.

== Reproduction ==
Tantilla rubra is oviparous.
