= Tantilla capistrata =

Conservation status
- Least Concern (IUCN 3.1)

Scientific classification
- Kingdom: Animalia
- Phylum: Chordata
- Class: Reptilia
- Order: Squamata
- Suborder: Serpentes
- Family: Colubridae
- Genus: Tantilla
- Species: T. capistrata

Binomial name
- Tantilla capistrata Cope, 1875

Species of snake

Tantilla capistrata, the Capistrata centipede snake or hooded centipede snake, is a species of snake of the family Colubridae.

The snake is found in northwestern Peru and southwestern Ecuador.
