= Tantilla flavilineata =

Conservation status
- Endangered (IUCN 3.1)

Scientific classification
- Kingdom: Animalia
- Phylum: Chordata
- Class: Reptilia
- Order: Squamata
- Suborder: Serpentes
- Family: Colubridae
- Genus: Tantilla
- Species: T. flavilineata

Binomial name
- Tantilla flavilineata H.M. Smith & Burger, 1950

Species of snake

Tantilla flavilineata, the yellow-lined centipede snake, is a species of snake of the family Colubridae.

The snake is found in Mexico.
