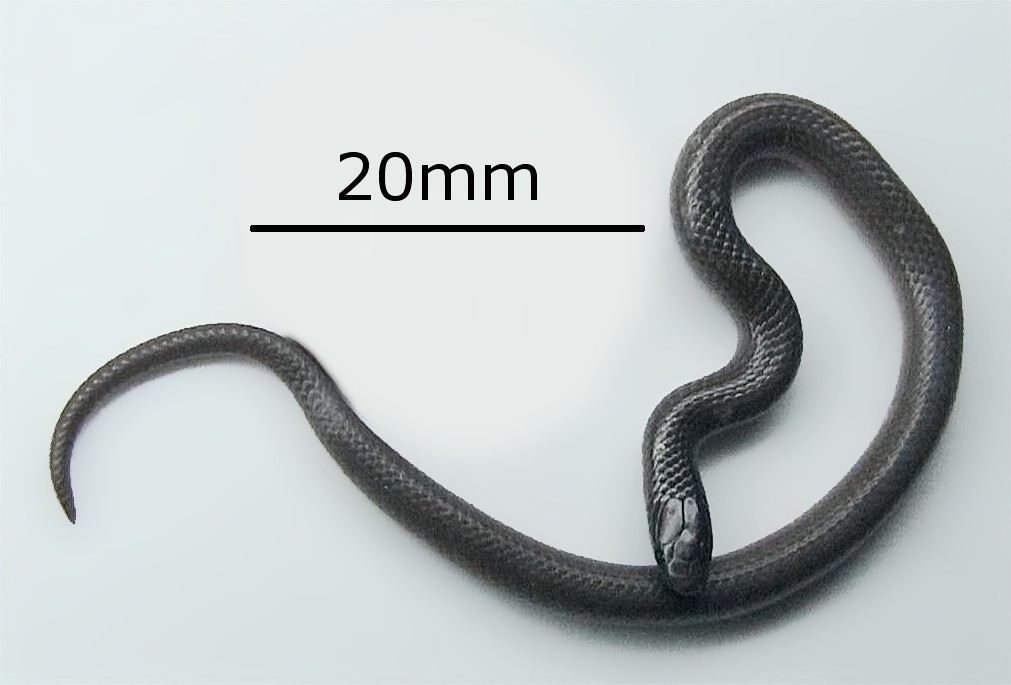
- Tantilla gracilis, flathead snake

Scientific classification
- Kingdom: Animalia
- Phylum: Chordata
- Class: Reptilia
- Order: Squamata
- Suborder: Serpentes
- Family: Colubridae
- Subfamily: Colubrinae
- Genus: Tantilla; Baird & Girard, 1853

Synonyms
- Homalocranion A.M.C. Duméril, Bibron & A.H.A. Duméril, 1854; Lioninia Hallowell, 1861; Microdromus Günther, 1873; Pogonaspis Cope, 1894

= Tantilla =

Genus of snakes

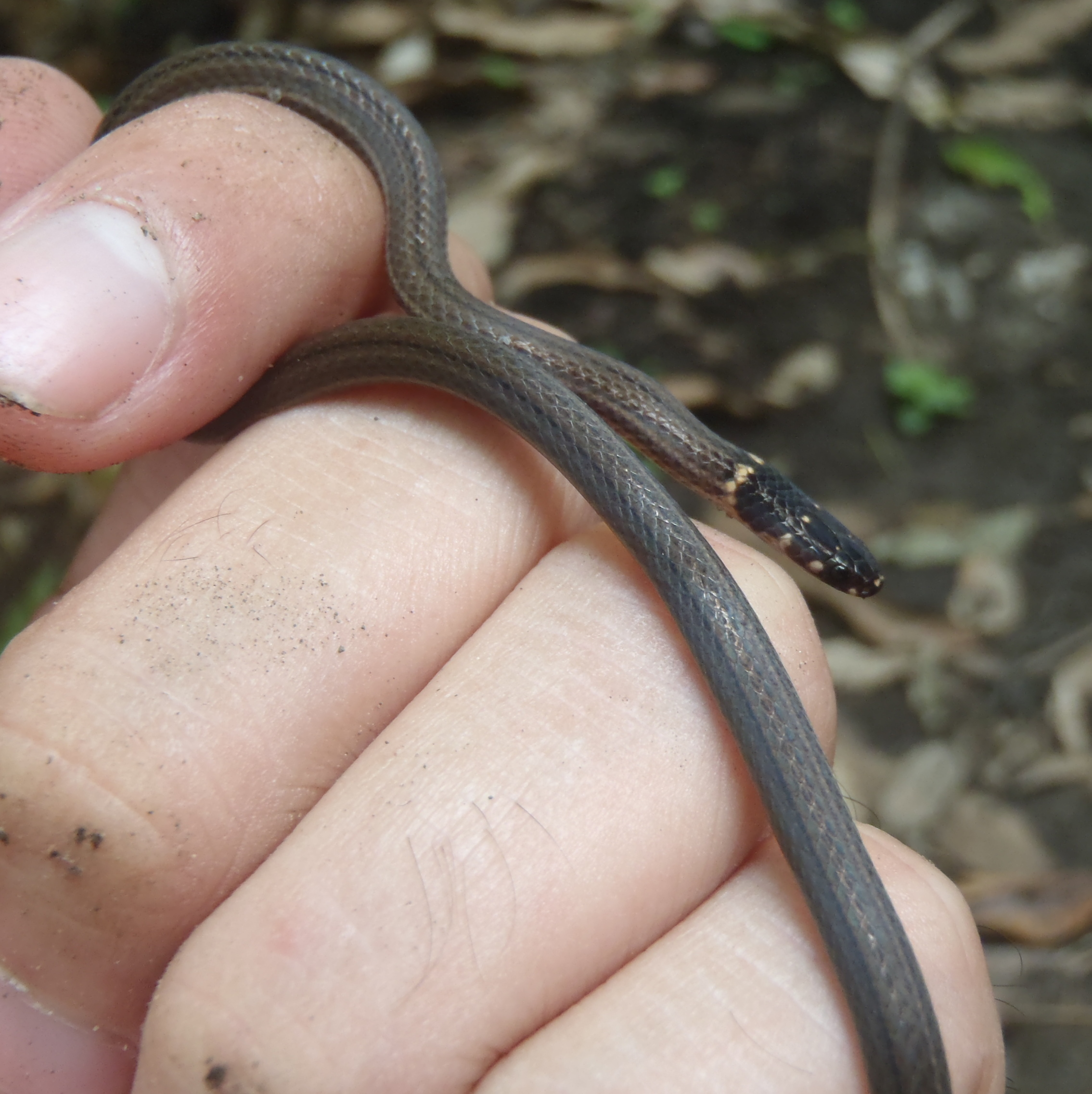
Centipede snake (Tantilla armillata), Nicaragua (August 3, 2013)

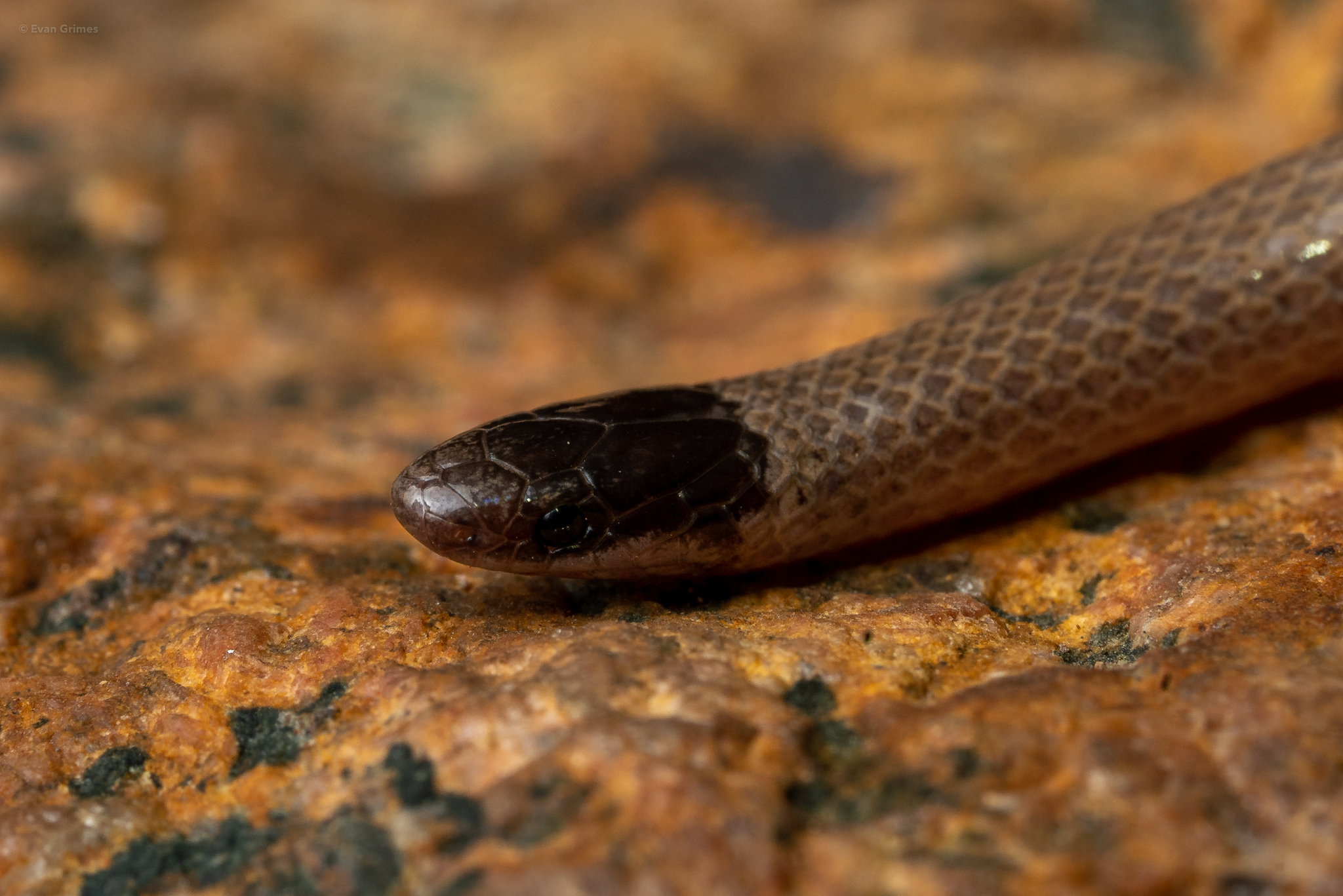
Smith's black-head snake (Tantilla hobartsmithi), El Paso County, Texas (July, 2021)

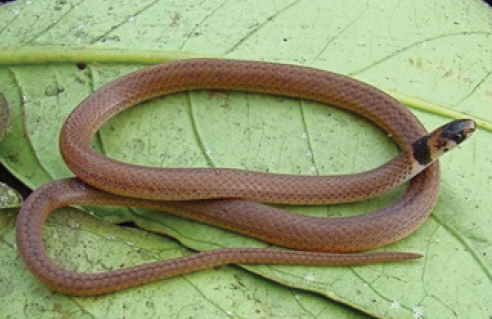
Neotropical black-headed snake (Tantilla melanocephala), Paraíba, Brazil (October 2, 2018)

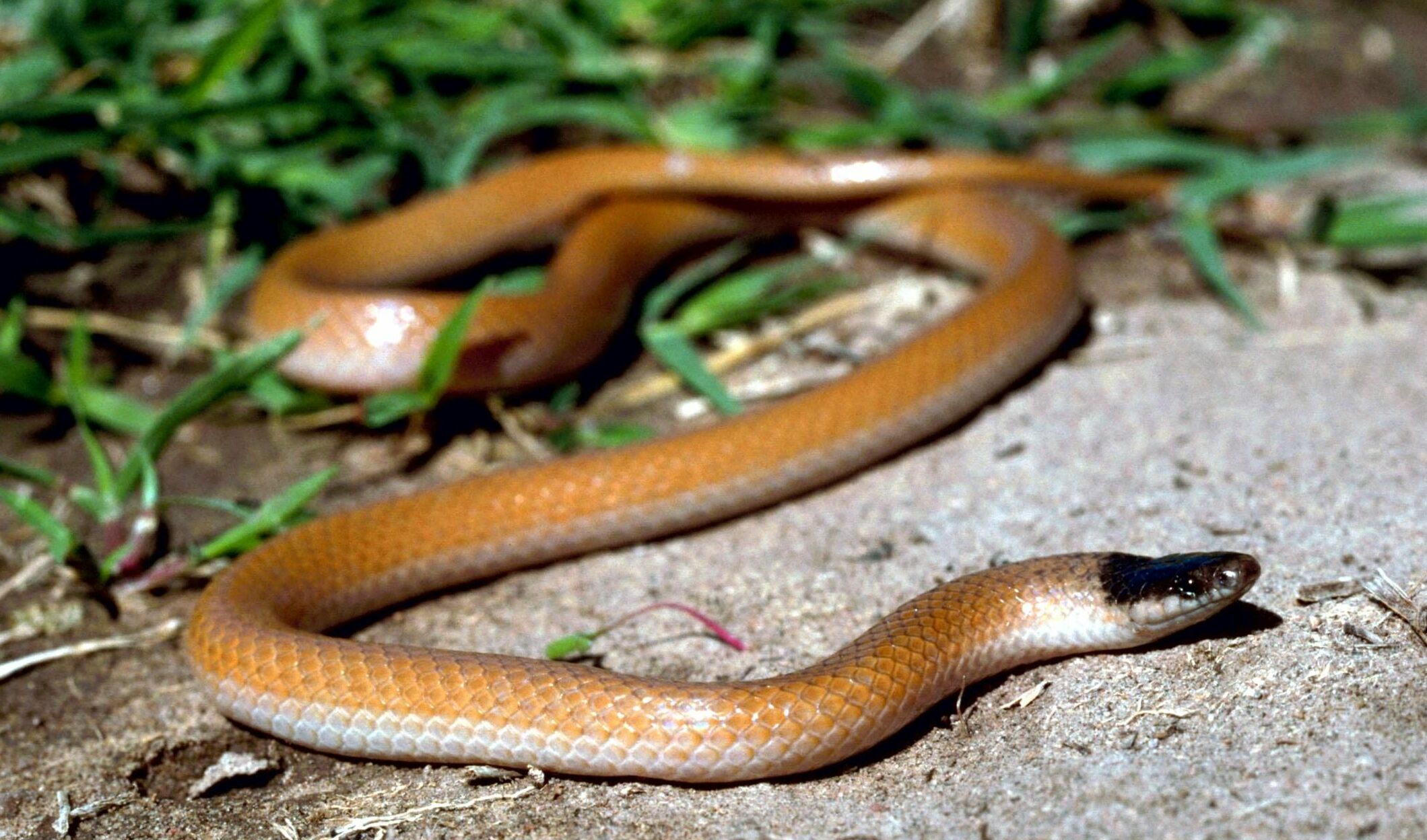
Plains black headed snake (Tantilla nigriceps)

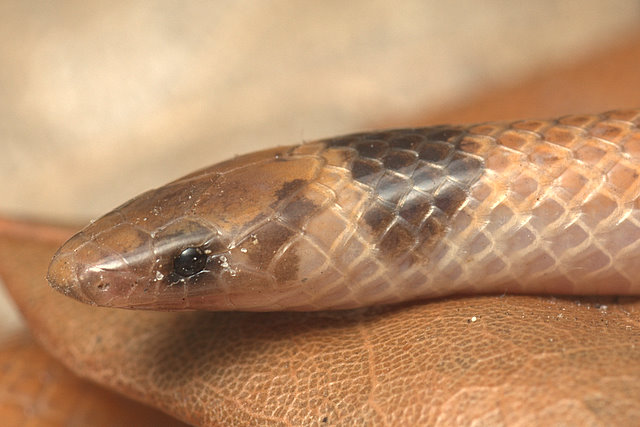
Florida crowned snake (Tantilla relicta), Highlands County, Florida (March 20, 2007)

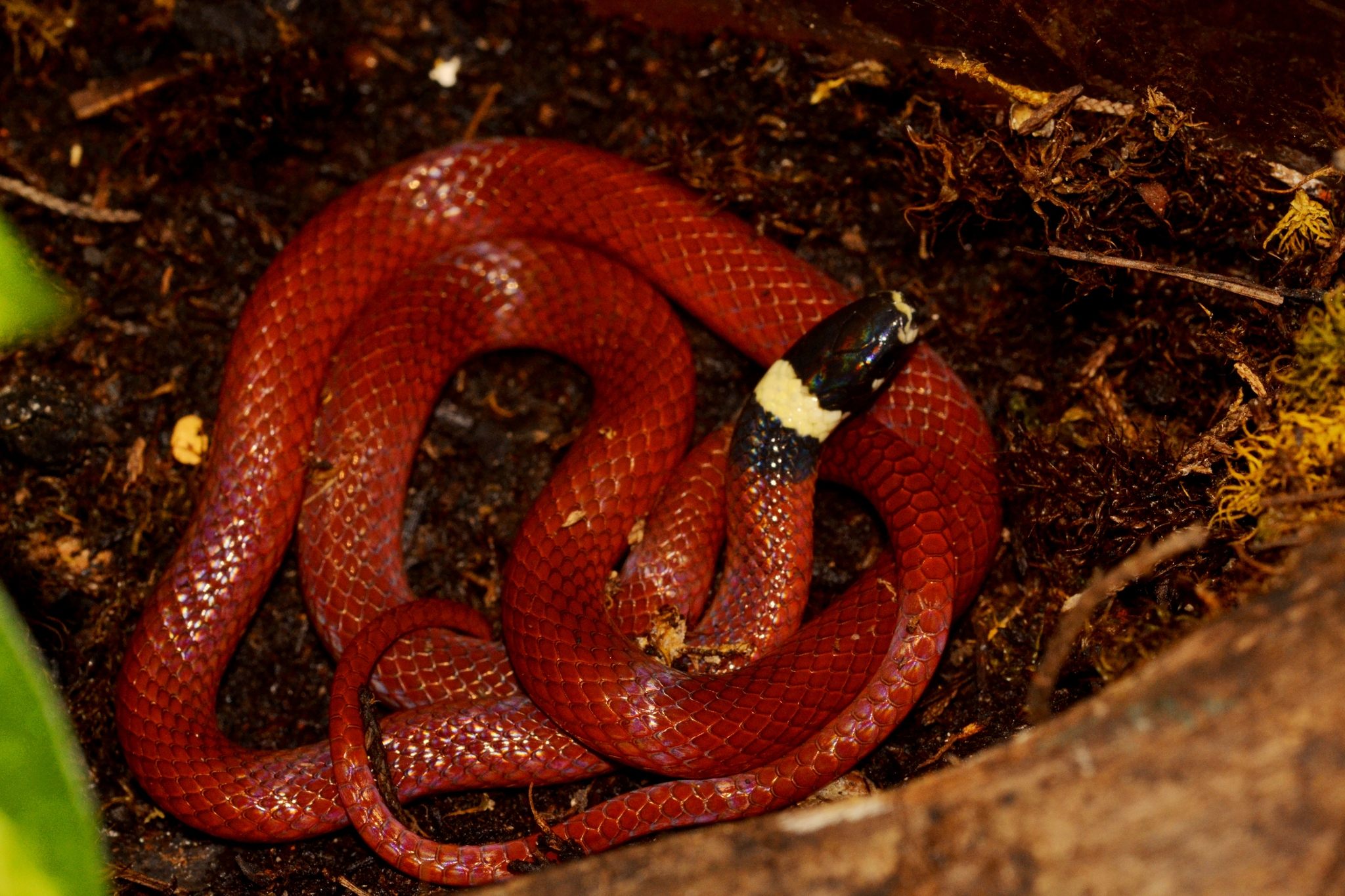
Red black-headed snake (Tantilla rubra), Chiapas, Mexico (October, 2014)

Tantilla is a large genus of harmless New World snakes in the family Colubridae. The genus includes 66 species, which are commonly known as centipede snakes, black-headed snakes, and flathead snakes.

== Description ==
Tantilla are small snakes, rarely exceeding 20 cm (8 inches) in total length (including tail). They are generally varying shades of brown, red or black in color. Some species have a brown body with a black head.

== Behavior ==
Tantilla are nocturnal, secretive snakes. They spend most of their time buried in the moist leaf litter of semi-forested regions or under rocks and debris.

== Diet ==
The diet of snakes of the genus Tantilla consists primarily of invertebrates, including scorpions, centipedes, spiders, and various insects.

== Species ==
- Tantilla albiceps Barbour, 1925 – Barbour's centipede snake – Panama
- Tantilla alticola (Boulenger, 1903) – Boulenger's centipede snake – Nicaragua, Costa Rica, Panama, Colombia
- Tantilla andinista Wilson & Mena, 1980 – Andes centipede snake – Ecuador
- Tantilla armillata Cope, 1876 – Costa Rica, El Salvador, Guatemala, Honduras, Nicaragua, Panama
- Tantilla atriceps (Günther, 1895) – Mexican blackhead snake – US (Arizona, Texas, New Mexico), northern Mexico
- Tantilla bairdi Stuart, 1941 – Baird's black-headed snake – Guatemala
- Tantilla berguidoi Batista, Mebert, Lotzkat & Wilson, 2016 – Chucantí centipede snake – Panama
- Tantilla bocourti (Günther, 1895) – Bocourt's black-headed snake – Mexico
- Tantilla boipiranga Sawaya & Sazima, 2003 – Brazil
- Tantilla brevicauda Mertens, 1952 – Mertens's centipede snake – El Salvador
- Tantilla briggsi Savitzky & H.M. Smith, 1971 – Briggs's centipede snake – Mexico
- Tantilla calamarina Cope, 1876 – Pacific Coast centipede snake – Mexico
- Tantilla capistrata Cope, 1876 – Capistrata centipede snake – Peru
- Tantilla carolina Palacios-Aguilar, Fucsko, Jiménez-Arcos, Wilson & Mata-Silva, 2022 – Carolina's little snake – Mexico
- Tantilla cascadae Wilson & Meyer, 1981 – Michoacán centipede snake – Mexico
- Tantilla ceboruca Canseco-Márquez et al., 2007 – Mexico
- Tantilla coronadoi Hartweg, 1944 – Guerreran centipede snake – Mexico
- Tantilla coronata Baird & Girard, 1853 – southeastern crowned snake – southeastern United States
- Tantilla cucullata Minton, 1956 – Big Bend blackhead snake – US (Texas), Mexico
- Tantilla cuniculator H.M. Smith, 1939 – Peten centipede snake – south Mexico, Belize, Guatemala
- Tantilla deppei (Bocourt, 1883) – Deppe's centipede snake – Mexico
- Tantilla excelsa McCranie & E.N. Smith, 2017 – Honduras
- Tantilla flavilineata H.M. Smith & Burger, 1950 – yellow-lined centipede snake – Mexico
- Tantilla gottei McCranie & E.N. Smith, 2017 – Honduras
- Tantilla gracilis Baird & Girard, 1853 – flathead snake – southwestern United States, northern Mexico
- Tantilla hendersoni Stafford, 2004 – Peten centipede snake – Belize
- Tantilla hobartsmithi Taylor, 1936 – southwestern blackhead snake – southwestern United States, northern Mexico
- Tantilla impensa Campbell, 1998 – Guatemala, Honduras, Mexico
- Tantilla insulamontana Wilson & Mena, 1980 – mountain centipede snake – Ecuador
- Tantilla jani (Günther, 1895) – Jan's centipede snake – Guatemala
- Tantilla johnsoni Wilson, Vaughn & Dixon, 1999 – Mexico
- Tantilla lempira Wilson & Mena, 1980 – Mena's centipede snake – Honduras
- Tantilla lydia Antúnez-Fonseca, Castro, España, Townsend & Wilson, 2020 – Honduras
- Tantilla melanocephala (Linnaeus, 1758) – blackhead snake – Mexico, Central and South America.
- Tantilla miyatai Wilson & Knight, 1987 – Ecuador
- Tantilla moesta (Günther, 1863) – blackbelly centipede snake – Mexico, Guatemala, Belize
- Tantilla nigra (Boulenger, 1914) – black centipede snake – Colombia
- Tantilla nigriceps Kennicott, 1860 – plains blackhead snake – southwestern United States, northern Mexico
- Tantilla oaxacae Wilson & Meyer, 1971 – Oaxacan centipede snake Mexico
- Tantilla olympia Townsend, Wilson, Medina-Flores & Herrera, 2013 – Honduras
- Tantilla oolitica Telford, 1966 – rim rock crowned snake – US (Florida)
- Tantilla petersi Wilson, 1979 – Peters's blackhead snake
- Tantilla planiceps (Blainville, 1835) – western blackhead snake – United States (California), northern Mexico
- Tantilla psittaca McCranie, 2011 – Honduras
- Tantilla relicta Telford, 1966 – Florida crowned snake – US (Florida)
- Tantilla reticulata (Cope, 1860) – reticulate centipede snake – Nicaragua, Costa Rica, Panama, Colombia
- Tantilla robusta Canseco-Márquez, Mendelson & Gutiérrez-Mayén, 2002 – Mexico
- Tantilla rubra Cope, 1876 – Big Bend blackhead snake – Guatemala, Mexico
- Tantilla ruficeps Cope, 1894 – Costa Rica, Nicaragua, Panama
- Tantilla schistosa (Bocourt, 1883) – red earth centipede snake – Mexico, Belize, Guatemala, El Salvador, Honduras, Nicaragua, Costa Rica, Panama
- Tantilla semicincta (A.M.C. Duméril, Bibron & A.H.A. Duméril, 1854) – ringed centipede snake – Panama, Colombia, Venezuela
- Tantilla sertula Wilson & Campbell, 2000 – Mexico
- Tantilla shawi Taylor, 1949 – Potosí centipede snake – Mexico
- Tantilla slavensi Pérez-Higareda, H.M. Smith & R.B. Smith, 1985 – Slavens's centipede snake – Mexico
- Tantilla stenigrammi McCranie & E.N. Smith, 2017 – Honduras
- Tantilla striata Dunn, 1928 – striped centipede snake – Mexico
- Tantilla supracincta (W. Peters, 1863) – banded centipede snake – Nicaragua, Costa Rica, Panama, Ecuador
- Tantilla taeniata Bocourt, 1883 – Central American centipede snake – Mexico, Guatemala, Honduras, El Salvador, Nicaragua
- Tantilla tayrae Wilson, 1983 – Volcán Tacaná centipede snake – Mexico
- Tantilla tecta Campbell & E.N. Smith, 1997 – white-striped centipede snake – Guatemala
- Tantilla tjiasmantoi (Koch & Venegas, 2016) – Tjiasmanto's centipede snake – Peru
- Tantilla trilineata (W. Peters, 1880) – Brazilian three-lined centipede snake – Brazil
- Tantilla triseriata H.M. Smith & P.W. Smith, 1951 – Mexican three-lined centipede snake – Mexico
- Tantilla tritaeniata H.M. Smith & Williams, 1966 – three-banded centipede snake – Honduras
- Tantilla vermiformis (Hallowell, 1861) – Hallowell's centipede snake – Nicaragua, Costa Rica, El Salvator
- Tantilla vulcani Campbell, 1998 – Guatemala and Mexico
- Tantilla wilcoxi Stejneger, 1902 – Chihuahuan blackhead snake – US (Arizona), northern Mexico
- Tantilla yaquia H.M. Smith, 1942 – Yaqui blackhead snake – US (Arizona, New Mexico), Mexico

Nota bene: A binomial authority in parentheses indicates that the species was originally described in a genus other than Tantilla.
