= Tantilla briggsi =

Conservation status
- Data Deficient (IUCN 3.1)

Scientific classification
- Kingdom: Animalia
- Phylum: Chordata
- Class: Reptilia
- Order: Squamata
- Suborder: Serpentes
- Family: Colubridae
- Genus: Tantilla
- Species: T. briggsi

Binomial name
- Tantilla briggsi Savitzky & H.M. Smith, 1971

Species of snake

Tantilla briggsi, also known commonly as Briggs's centipede snake and la culebra centipedívora de Briggs in Mexican Spanish, is a species of snake in the subfamily Colubrinae of the family Colubridae. The species is endemic to Mexico.

== Etymology ==
The specific name, briggsi, is in honor of William T. Briggs who was Dean of the College of Arts and Sciences at the University of Colorado.

== Geographic range ==
Tantilla briggsi is found in the Mexican state of Oaxaca.

== Habitat ==
The preferred natural habitat of Tantilla briggsi is forest, at altitudes of 100–200 m (330–660 ft).

== Behavior ==
Tantilla briggsi is terrestrial.

== Reproduction ==
Tantilla briggsi is oviparous.
