= Tantilla gottei =

Scientific classification
- Kingdom: Animalia
- Phylum: Chordata
- Class: Reptilia
- Order: Squamata
- Suborder: Serpentes
- Family: Colubridae
- Genus: Tantilla
- Species: T. gottei

Binomial name
- Tantilla gottei McCranie & E.N. Smith, 2017

Species of snake

Tantilla gottei is a species of snake in the subfamily Colubrinae of the family Colubridae. The species is endemic to Honduras.

== Etymology ==
The specific name, gottei, is in honor of American herpetologist Steve W. Gotte.

== Description ==
Dorsally, Tantilla gottei is brown, with paler stripes. Ventrally, it is yellow, which fades to cream or white in preservative. It has a low number of ventrals (142–158).

== Geographic range ==
Tantilla gottei is found in central Honduras, in Francisco Morazán Department and La Paz Department.

== Habitat ==
The preferred natural habitat of Tantilla gottei is forest, at altitudes of 500–1,280 m (1,640–4,200 ft).
