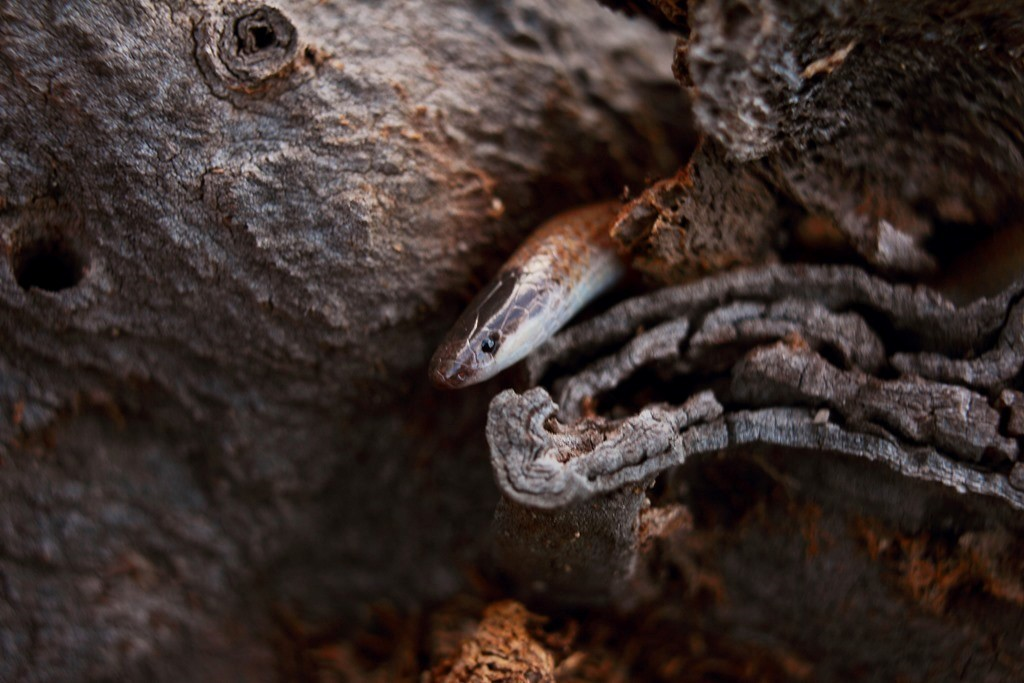
- Mexican Black-headed Snake (Tantilla atriceps)

Conservation status
- Least Concern (IUCN 3.1)

Scientific classification
- Kingdom: Animalia
- Phylum: Chordata
- Class: Reptilia
- Order: Squamata
- Suborder: Serpentes
- Family: Colubridae
- Genus: Tantilla
- Species: T. atriceps

Binomial name
- Tantilla atriceps (Günther, 1895)

= Tantilla atriceps =

Species of snake

Tantilla atriceps, the Mexican blackhead snake, a species of snake of the family Colubridae.

The snake is found in Texas in the United States and Mexico.
