= Tantilla miyatai =

Conservation status
- Data Deficient (IUCN 3.1)

Scientific classification
- Kingdom: Animalia
- Phylum: Chordata
- Class: Reptilia
- Order: Squamata
- Suborder: Serpentes
- Family: Colubridae
- Genus: Tantilla
- Species: T. miyatai

Binomial name
- Tantilla miyatai Wilson & Knight in Wilson, 1987

Species of snake

Tantilla miyatai is a species of snake in the subfamily Colubrinae of the family Colubridae. The species is endemic to Ecuador.

== Etymology ==
The specific name, miyatai, is in honor of American herpetologist Kenneth Ichiro Miyata (1951–1983).

== Geographic distribution ==
Tantilla miyatai is found in the northern Sierra region of Ecuador, in Pichincha Province.

== Habitat ==
The preferred natural habitat of Tantilla miyatai is forest, at an altitude of 150 m (490 ft).

== Reproduction ==
Tantilla miyatai is oviparous.
