= Tantilla jani =

Conservation status
- Vulnerable (IUCN 3.1)

Scientific classification
- Kingdom: Animalia
- Phylum: Chordata
- Class: Reptilia
- Order: Squamata
- Suborder: Serpentes
- Family: Colubridae
- Genus: Tantilla
- Species: T. jani

Binomial name
- Tantilla jani (Günther, 1895)

Synonyms
- Homalocranium jani Günther, 1895; Homalocranium fuscum — Boulenger, 1896; Tantilla jani — H.M. Smith, 1942; Tantilla cuesta Wilson, 1982; Tantilla jani — Liner, 1994

Species of snake

Tantilla jani, also known commonly as Jan's centipede snake, is a species of snake in the subfamily Colubrinae of the family Colubridae. The species is native to Guatemala and southern Mexico.

== Etymology ==
The specific name, jani, is in honor of Italian taxonomist Giorgio Jan.

== Geographic range ==
Tantilla jani is found in Guatemala, and in adjacent Mexico in the states of Chiapas and Oaxaca.

== Habitat ==
The preferred natural habitat of Tantilla jani is forest.

== Reproduction ==
Tantilla jani is oviparous.
