= Tantilla stenigrammi =

Scientific classification
- Kingdom: Animalia
- Phylum: Chordata
- Class: Reptilia
- Order: Squamata
- Suborder: Serpentes
- Family: Colubridae
- Genus: Tantilla
- Species: T. stenigrammi

Binomial name
- Tantilla stenigrammi McCranie & E.N. Smith, 2017

Species of snake

Tantilla stenigrammi is a species of snake of the family Colubridae.

The snake is found in Honduras.
