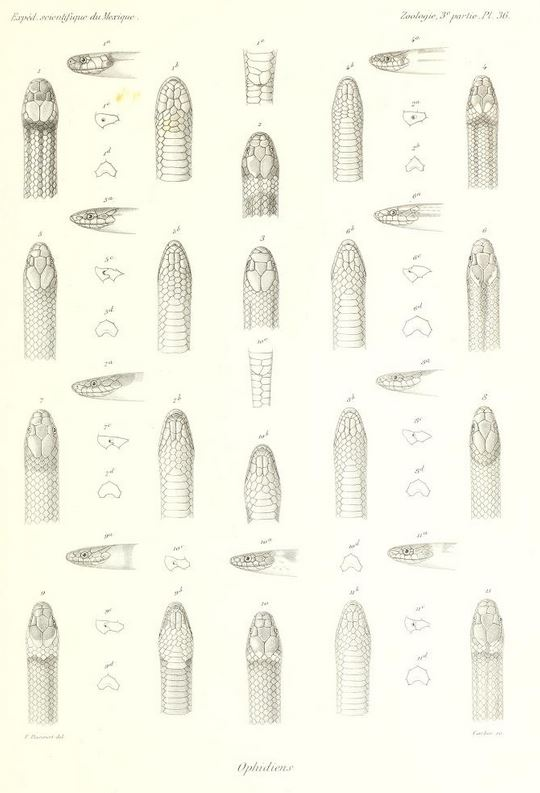
- Figure 11, bottom right corner

Conservation status
- Least Concern (IUCN 3.1)

Scientific classification
- Kingdom: Animalia
- Phylum: Chordata
- Class: Reptilia
- Order: Squamata
- Suborder: Serpentes
- Family: Colubridae
- Genus: Tantilla
- Species: T. deppei

Binomial name
- Tantilla deppei (Bocourt, 1883)

Synonyms
- Homalocranion deppei Bocourt, 1883; Homalocranium deppei (Bocourt, 1883)

= Tantilla deppei =

Species of snake

Tantilla deppei, also known commonly as Deppe's centipede snake and la culebra centipedívora de Deppe in Mexican Spanish, is a species of snake in the subfamily Colubrinae of the family Colubridae. The species is endemic to Mexico.

== Etymology ==
The specific name, deppei, is in honor of German naturalist Ferdinand Deppe.

== Geographic range ==
Tantilla deppei is found in central Mexico.

== Habitat ==
The preferred natural habitat of Tantilla deppei is forest.

== Behavior ==
Tantilla deppei is terrestrial, sheltering under rocks and other cover on the ground.

== Reproduction ==
Tantilla deppei is oviparous.
