= Tantilla carolina =

Scientific classification
- Kingdom: Animalia
- Phylum: Chordata
- Class: Reptilia
- Order: Squamata
- Suborder: Serpentes
- Family: Colubridae
- Genus: Tantilla
- Species: T. carolina

Binomial name
- Tantilla carolina Palacios-Aguilar, Fucsko, Jiménez-Arcos, Wilson, & Mata-Silva, 2022

Species of snake

Tantilla carolina, Carolina's little snake, is a species of snake of the family Colubridae.

The snake is found in Mexico.
