= Tantilla trilineata =

Scientific classification
- Kingdom: Animalia
- Phylum: Chordata
- Class: Reptilia
- Order: Squamata
- Suborder: Serpentes
- Family: Colubridae
- Genus: Tantilla
- Species: T. trilineata

Binomial name
- Tantilla trilineata (W. Peters, 1860)

Species of snake

Tantilla trilineata, the three-lined centipede snake, is a species of snake of the family Colubridae.

The snake species distribution is unknown.
