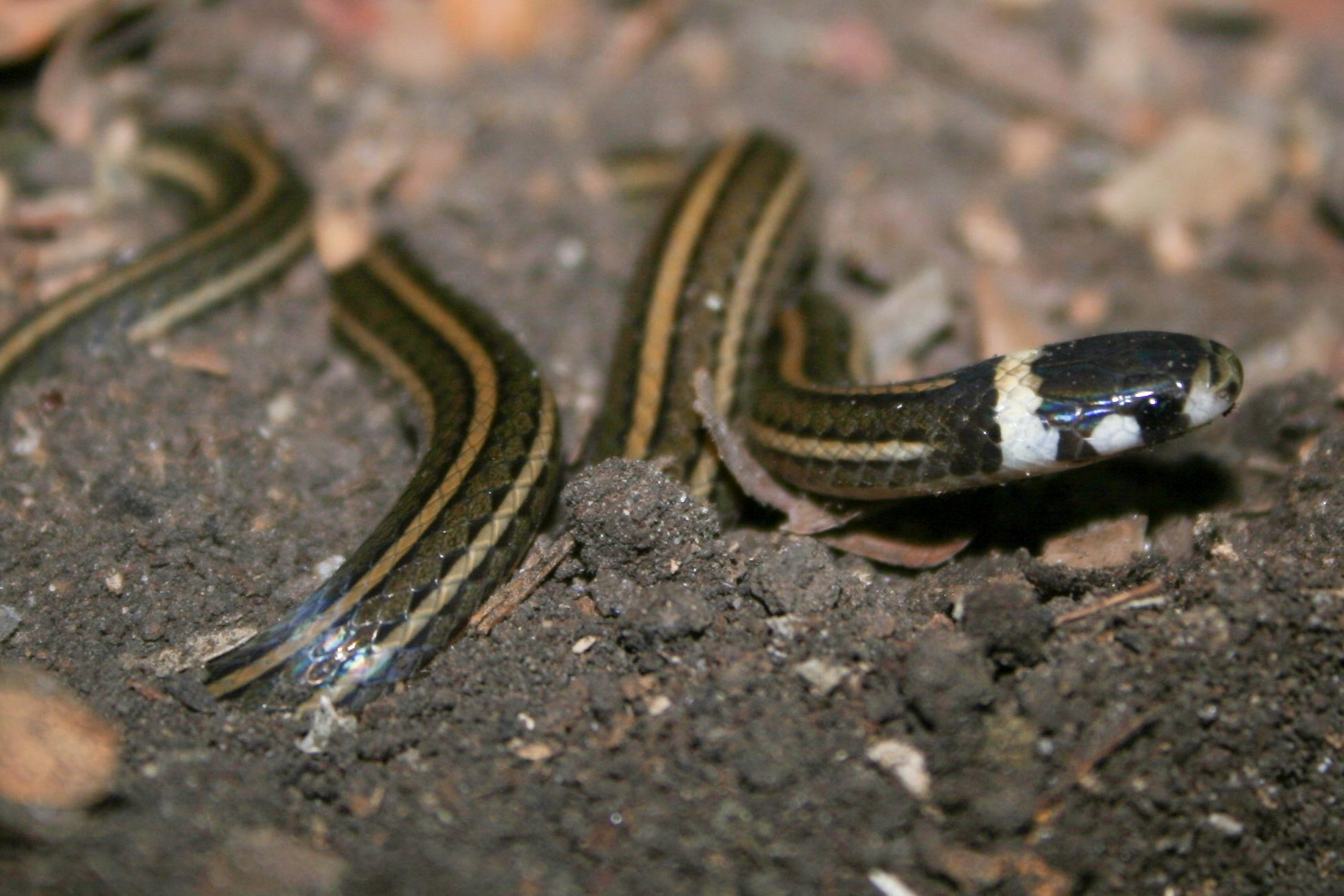

Conservation status
- Least Concern (IUCN 3.1)

Scientific classification
- Kingdom: Animalia
- Phylum: Chordata
- Class: Reptilia
- Order: Squamata
- Suborder: Serpentes
- Family: Colubridae
- Genus: Tantilla
- Species: T. taeniata

Binomial name
- Tantilla taeniata (Bocourt, 1883)

= Tantilla taeniata =

Species of snake

Tantilla taeniata, the Central American centipede snake, is a species of snake of the family Colubridae.

The snake is found in Guatemala, Honduras, Nicaragua, and El Salvador.
