= Tantilla cuniculator =

Peten Centipede Snake
- Tantilla cuniculator on white sand road

Conservation status
- Least Concern (IUCN 3.1)

Scientific classification
- Kingdom: Animalia
- Phylum: Chordata
- Class: Reptilia
- Order: Squamata
- Suborder: Serpentes
- Family: Colubridae
- Genus: Tantilla
- Species: T. cuniculator

Binomial name
- Tantilla cuniculator HM Smith, 1939

Species of snake

Tantilla cuniculator, the Peten centipede snake, is a species of snake of the family Colubridae.

The snake is found in Mexico, Belize, and Guatemala.
