= Tantilla triseriata =

Conservation status
- Data Deficient (IUCN 3.1)

Scientific classification
- Kingdom: Animalia
- Phylum: Chordata
- Class: Reptilia
- Order: Squamata
- Suborder: Serpentes
- Family: Colubridae
- Genus: Tantilla
- Species: T. triseriata

Binomial name
- Tantilla triseriata H.M. Smith & P.W. Smith, 1951

Species of snake

Tantilla triseriata, the three-lined centipede snake, is a species of snake of the family Colubridae.

The snake is found in Mexico.
