= Tantilla ceboruca =

Scientific classification
- Kingdom: Animalia
- Phylum: Chordata
- Class: Reptilia
- Order: Squamata
- Suborder: Serpentes
- Family: Colubridae
- Genus: Tantilla
- Species: T. ceboruca

Binomial name
- Tantilla ceboruca Canseco-Márquez, Smith, Ponce-Campos, Flores-Villela, & Campbell, 2007

Species of snake

Tantilla ceboruca, the Ceboruco centipede snake, is a species of snake of the family Colubridae.

The snake is found in Mexico.
