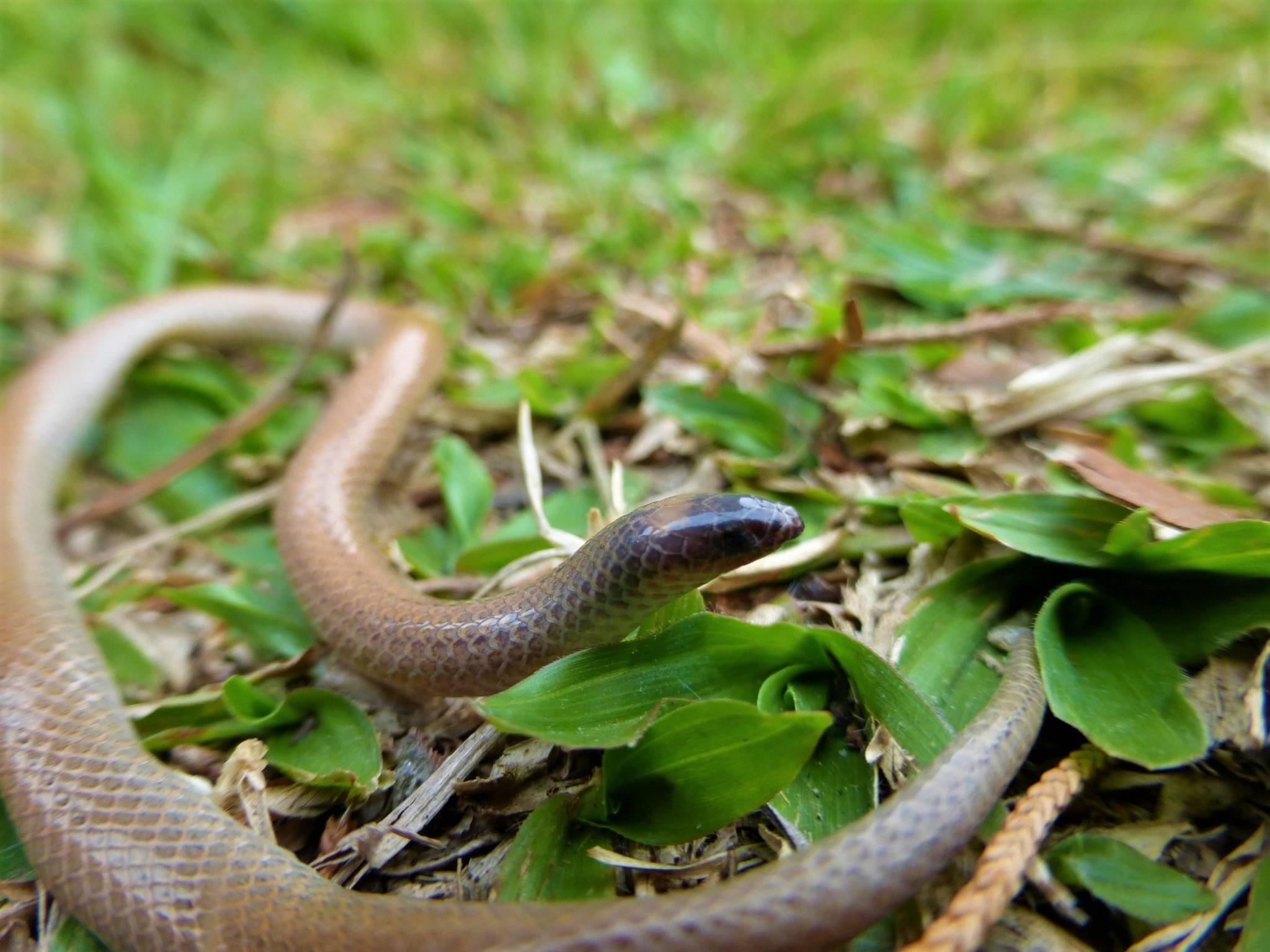

Conservation status
- Least Concern (IUCN 3.1)

Scientific classification
- Kingdom: Animalia
- Phylum: Chordata
- Class: Reptilia
- Order: Squamata
- Suborder: Serpentes
- Family: Colubridae
- Genus: Tantilla
- Species: T. vermiformis

Binomial name
- Tantilla vermiformis (Hallowell, 1861)

= Tantilla vermiformis =

Species of snake

Tantilla vermiformis, Hallowell's centipede snake, is a species of snake of the family Colubridae.

The snake species distribution is from Nicaragua, Costa Rica, El Salvador, Honduras, and Guatemala.
