= Tantilla hendersoni =

Conservation status
- Data Deficient (IUCN 3.1)

Scientific classification
- Kingdom: Animalia
- Phylum: Chordata
- Class: Reptilia
- Order: Squamata
- Suborder: Serpentes
- Family: Colubridae
- Genus: Tantilla
- Species: T. hendersoni

Binomial name
- Tantilla hendersoni Stafford, 2004

Species of snake

Tantilla hendersoni, also known as the Peten centipede snake, is a species of snake in the subfamily Colubrinae of the family Colubridae. It is generally very dark blackish-brown in color, with an orange-tan stripe running down the center of the body, a bright yellow collar around the neck, and two yellow-white lines along the sides. The species is currently only known from the Maya Mountains of Belize, but may also occur in neighbouring Guatemala. It inhabits broadleaf forest.

== Taxonomy ==
Tantilla hendersoni was formally described by the British herpetologist Peter J. Stafford in 2004 based on a specimen collected from the vicinity of Las Cuevas in Cayo District, Belize. The taxonomic validity of this species was questioned in 2010, when Stafford surmised that photographic evidence suggested this species was probably synonymous with T. impensa. The specific name, hendersoni, is in honor of American herpetologist Robert William Henderson. The snake has the common name Peten centipede snake.

== Description ==
Tantilla hendersoni is generally very dark blackish-brown in color. It has a variety of pale markings that contrast sharply with the generally dark body. There is an orange-tan stripe running down the center of the body from just behind the head to the tip of the tail, restricted entirely to the vertebral scales. This line is flanked by two yellow-white lines along the sides, running through scale rows 3 and 4. There is a bright yellow ring, forming a "collar", running around the back of the neck.

== Distribution and ecology ==
Tantilla hendersoni is native to the Maya Mountains of Belize, where it has been recorded from Las Cuevas in Cayo District and from the Toucan Ridge Ecology and Education Society Field Station in Middlesex in Stann Creek District. It likely has a wider distribution in the Maya Mountains, but is currently undersampled. Its range may also extend to the Vaca Plateau and Peten in Guatemala. The species has been documented from broadleaf forest, both primary broadleaf forest and secondary broadleaf forest growing in an old fruit orchard that had been abandoned for around 15 years.

== Conservation ==
Tantilla hendersoni was classified as being data-deficient by the IUCN when it was last evaluated in 2014.
