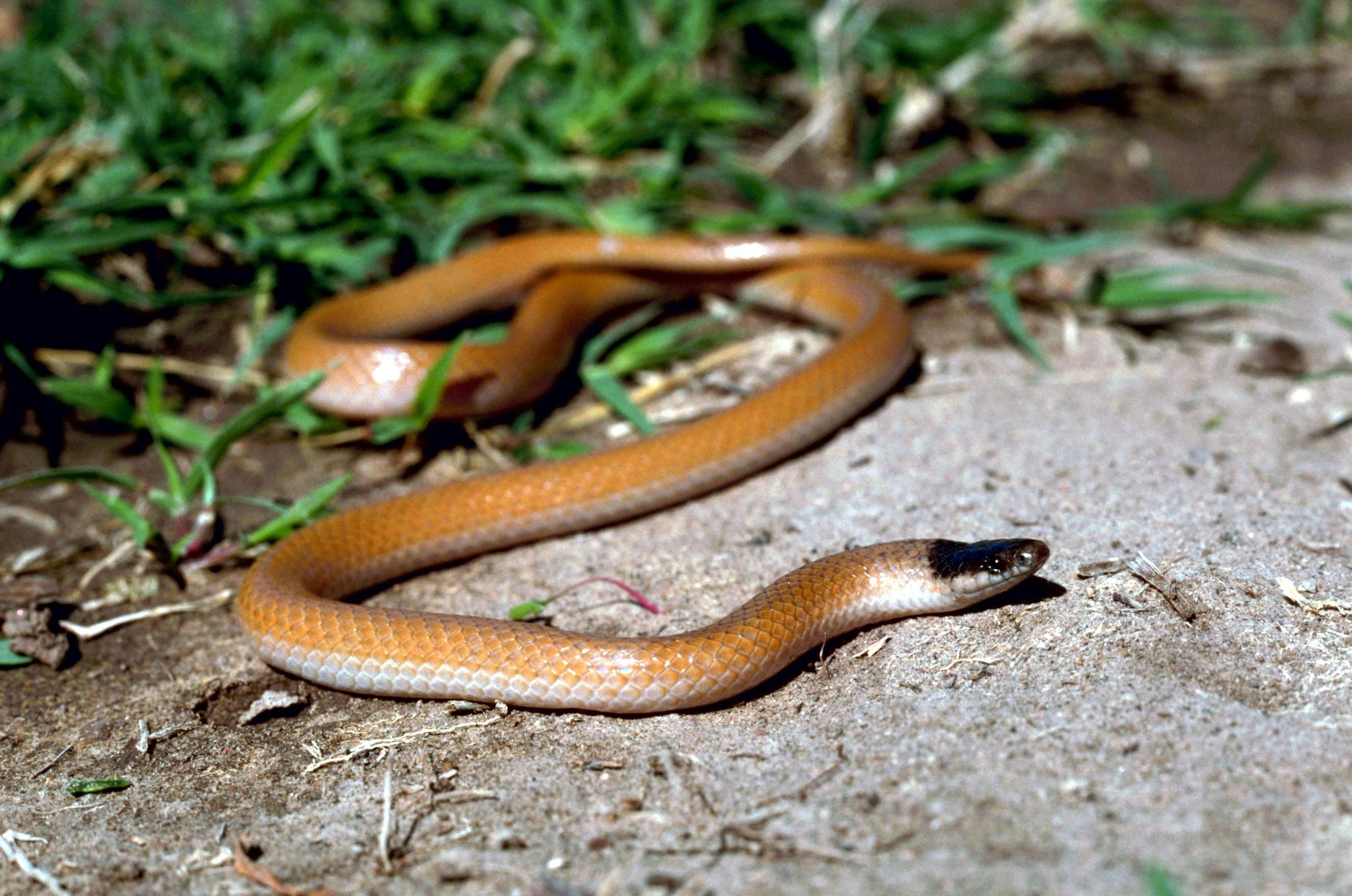

Conservation status
- Least Concern (IUCN 3.1)

Scientific classification
- Kingdom: Animalia
- Phylum: Chordata
- Class: Reptilia
- Order: Squamata
- Suborder: Serpentes
- Family: Colubridae
- Genus: Tantilla
- Species: T. nigriceps

Binomial name
- Tantilla nigriceps Kennicott, 1860
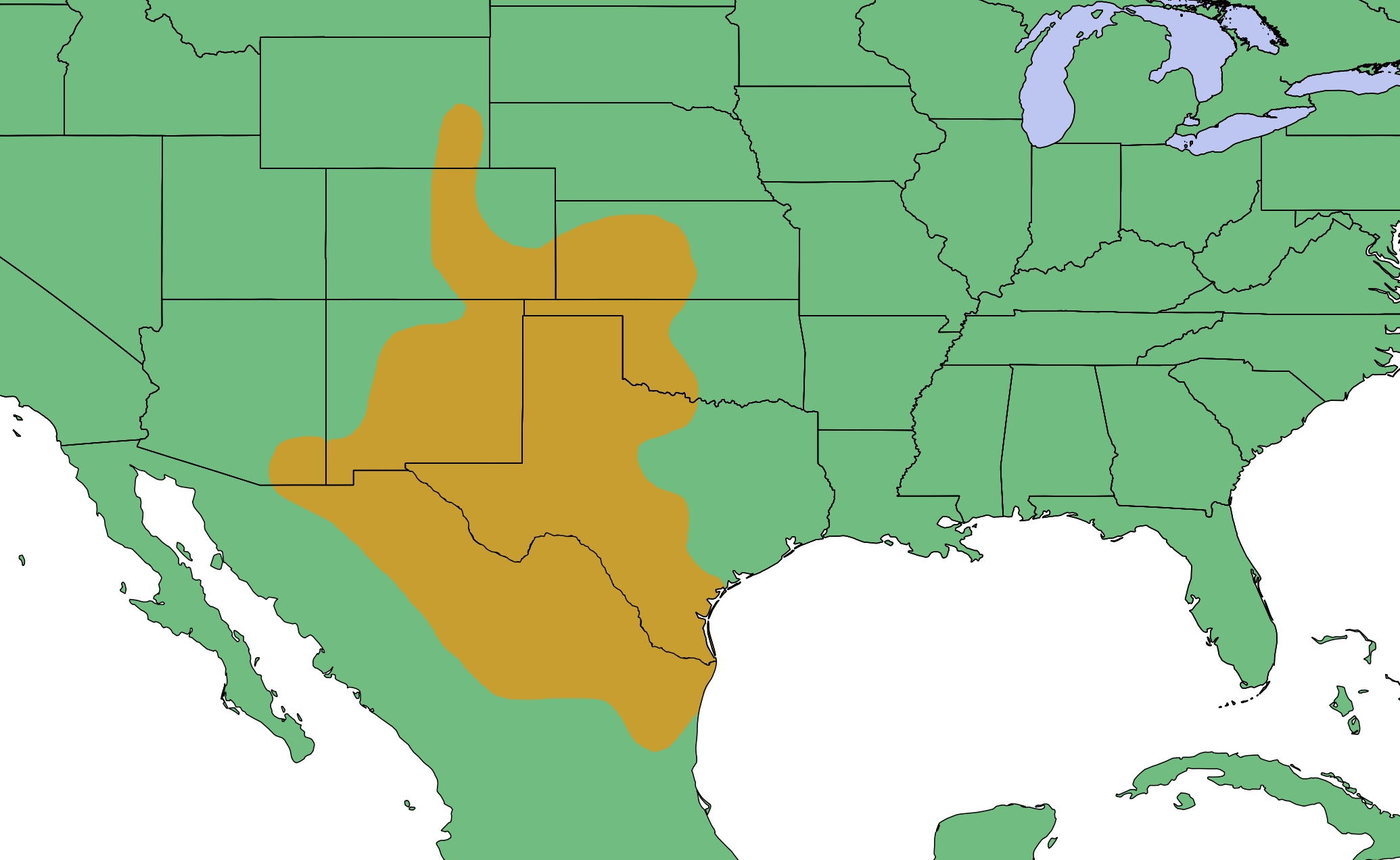

Synonyms
- Scolecophis fumiceps Cope, 1860; Homalocranion praeoculum Bocourt, 1883; Tantilla kirnia Blanchard, 1938 (fide Marx, 1958)

= Plains black-headed snake =

Species of snake

The Plains black-headed snake or Plains blackhead snake (Tantilla nigriceps) is a species of snake of the family Colubridae. They are approximately 18–38 cm (7.1–15.0 in) in length, with a uniform tan to brownish-gray. Their ventral scales are white with a pink or orange mid-line. It is readily distinguished from the Chihuahuan (T. wilcoxi) and Yaqui (T. yaquia) black-headed snakes by the absence of a light neck collar.

== Geographic range ==
The snake is found in the US states of Colorado, Wyoming, Texas, Kansas, Nebraska, Oklahoma, and New Mexico and in Mexico.

== Habitat ==
They are often found in rocky or grassy prairies, or hillsides where the soil is moist. Occasionally they are found in basements.

== Behavior ==
The Plains black-headed snake is often secretive and can be found seeking refuge in leaf-litter or in small burrows, while being surface active at night. It has been collected from February into September in Arizona, but most are found in August. It is susceptible to desiccation and unlikely to be found surface active or under surface debris in dry periods or seasons.

== Breeding ==
It is presumed that they lay up to three eggs in the spring or early summer, where hatchlings will begin to emerge during the summer.
