= Tantilla coronadoi =

Conservation status
- Least Concern (IUCN 3.1)

Scientific classification
- Kingdom: Animalia
- Phylum: Chordata
- Class: Reptilia
- Order: Squamata
- Suborder: Serpentes
- Family: Colubridae
- Genus: Tantilla
- Species: T. coronadoi

Binomial name
- Tantilla coronadoi Hartweg, 1944

Species of snake

Tantilla coronadoi, also known commonly as the Guerreran centipede snake and la culebra centipedívora de Guerrero in Mexican Spanish, is a species of snake in the subfamily Colubrinae of the family Colubridae.

== Etymology ==
The specific name, coronadoi, is in honor of Mexican ichthyologist Salvador Coronado.

== Geographic range ==
Tantilla coronadoi is found in the Mexican state of Guerrero.

== Habitat ==
The preferred natural habitat of Tantilla coronadoi is forest.

== Behavior ==
Tantilla coronadoi is terrestrial and fossorial.

== Reproduction ==
- Tantilla coronadoi is oviparous.
