= List of animals in the Galápagos Islands =

This is a list of animals that live in the Galápagos Islands. The fauna of the Galápagos Islands include a total of 9,000 confirmed species, over 1,500 of which are endemic to the archipelago. Due to amphibians' intolerance of saltwater, no amphibians naturally occur on the Galapagos Islands.

== Mammals ==
=== Marsupials ===
Common name	Picture	Scientific name	Distribution and habitat	IUCN status (Note: This column sorts by threat level, as outlined in the key above.)
Common opossum		Didelphis marsupialis	Introduced, occurs only on Santa Fé	VU^{IUCN}

=== Rodents ===
Common name	Picture	Scientific name	Distribution and habitat	IUCN status (Note: This column sorts by threat level, as outlined in the key above.)
Galapagos rice rat		Aegialomys galapagoensis	Endemic, occurs only on Santa Fé and possibly Santiago	VU^{IUCN}
Santiago rice rat	—N/a	Nesoryzomys swarthi	Endemic, occurs only on Santiago	VU^{IUCN}
Fernandina rice rat	—N/a	Nesoryzomys fernandinae	Endemic, occurs only on Fernandina	VU^{IUCN}
Large Fernandina rice rat	—N/a	Nesoryzomys narboroughi	Endemic, occurs only on Fernandina	VU^{IUCN}
Darwin's Galapagos mouse	—N/a	Nesoryzomys darwini	Endemic, extinct	EX^{IUCN}
Indefatigable Galapagos mouse	—N/a	Nesoryzomys indefessus	Endemic, extinct	EX^{IUCN}
Galapagos giant rat		Megaoryzomys curioi	Endemic, extinct	EX^{IUCN}
House mouse		Mus musculus	Introduced, found on Santiago, Santa Cruz, Isabela, San Cristóbal, Florena, Baltra, North Seymour, South Plaza, and North Plaza	LC^{IUCN}
Black rat		Rattus rattus	Introduced, found on Baltra, Bartolomé, Floreana, Isabela, Santa Cruz, San Cristóbal, North Seymour, Pinzón, and Santiago islands.	LC^{IUCN}
Brown rat		Rattus norvegicus	Introduced, found on Santa Cruz, San Cristóbal, Isabela, Rábida	LC^{IUCN}

=== Pinnipeds ===
Common name	Picture	Scientific name	Distribution and habitat	IUCN status (Note: This column sorts by threat level, as outlined in the key above.)
Galápagos fur seal		Arctocephalus galapagoensis	Endemic, occurs on all islands	EN^{IUCN}
Galápagos sea lion		Zalophus wollebaeki	Occurs on all islands	EN^{IUCN}

=== Bats ===
Common name	Picture	Scientific name	Distribution and habitat	IUCN status (Note: This column sorts by threat level, as outlined in the key above.)
South American hoary bat		Lasiurus villosissimus	Occurs on Santa Cruz, San Cristóbal, Isabela, Santiago, and Floreana	LC^{IUCN}
Southern red bat		Lasiurus blossevillii brachyotis	Endemic subspecies, only found on Santa Cruz and San Cristóbal	LC^{IUCN}

=== Bovids ===
Common name	Picture	Scientific name	Distribution and habitat	
Cattle		Bos taurus	Introduced, found on Floreana, Isabela, Santa Cruz and San Cristóbal	NE^{IUCN}
Goat		Capra hircus	Introduced, found on Santa Cruz, San Cristóbal, Floreana and southern Isabela. Eradicated from northern Isabela, Baltra, Española, Plaza Sur, Santa Fe, Marchena, Rábida, Santiago, and Pinta	NE^{IUCN}

=== Cetaceans ===
Common name	Picture	Scientific name	Distribution and habitat	IUCN status (Note: This column sorts by threat level, as outlined in the key above.)
Common bottlenose dolphin		Tursiops truncatus		LC^{IUCN}
Minke whale		Balaenoptera acutorostrata		LC^{IUCN}
Bryde's whale		Balaenoptera brydei		LC^{IUCN}
Sei whale		Balaenoptera borealis		EN^{IUCN}
Fin whale		Balaenoptera physalus		VU^{IUCN}
Blue whale		Balaenoptera musculus		EN^{IUCN}
Humpback whale		Megaptera novaeangliae		LC^{IUCN}
Sperm whale		Physeter macrocephalus		VU^{IUCN}
Orca		Orcinus orca		DD^{IUCN}
Spinner dolphin		Stenella longirostris		LC^{IUCN}
Striped dolphin		Stenella coeruleoalba		LC^{IUCN}
Dwarf sperm whale		Kogia sima		LC^{IUCN}
Risso's Dolphin		Grampus griseus		LC^{IUCN}
Short-finned pilot whale		Globicephala macrorhynchus		LC^{IUCN}
Melon-headed whale		Peponocephala electra		LC^{IUCN}
Indo-Pacific beaked whale		Indopacetus pacificus		LC^{IUCN}
Cuvier's beaked whale		Ziphius cavirostris		LC^{IUCN}
Fraser's dolphin		Lagenodelphis hosei		LC^{IUCN}
Blainville's beaked whale		Mesoplodon densirostris		LC^{IUCN}
Ginkgo-toothed beaked whale		Mesoplodon ginkgodens		DD^{IUCN}

== Reptiles ==
Common name	Picture	Scientific name	Distribution and habitat	IUCN status (Note: This column sorts by threat level, as outlined in the key above.)
Pinta Island tortoise		Chelonoidis niger abingdonii	Extinct, formerly Pinta Island	EX^{IUCN}
Volcán Wolf tortoise		Chelonoidis niger becki	Only occurs on Northern Isabela Island, northern and western slopes of Volcán Wolf.	VU^{IUCN}
Chatham Island tortoise		Chelonoidis niger chathamensis	Only occurs on Northeastern San Cristóbal Island	EN^{IUCN}
Santiago Island giant tortoise		Chelonoidis niger darwini	Only occurs on West-central Santiago Island	CR^{IUCN}
Eastern Santa Cruz Island tortoise		Chelonoidis niger donfaustoi	Only occurs on Eastern Santa Cruz Island	CR^{IUCN}
Pinzón Island giant tortoise		Chelonoidis niger duncanensis	Only occurs on Southwestern Pinzón Island	VU^{IUCN}
Sierra Negra giant tortoise		Chelonoidis niger guentheri	Only occurs on Isabela Island on Sierra Negra volcano, one group in the east and another over the western and southwestern slopes	CR^{IUCN}
Hood Island tortoise		Chelonoidis niger hoodensis	Only occurs on Española Island	CR^{IUCN}
Volcán Darwin tortoise		Chelonoidis niger microphyes	Only occurs on Isabela Island, on the southern and western slopes of Volcán Darwin	EN^{IUCN}
Floreana Island giant tortoise	—N/a	Chelonoidis niger niger	Extinct, formerly Floreana Island, possible hybrids on Isabela Island	EX^{IUCN}
Fernandina Island tortoise	—N/a	Chelonoidis niger phantasticus	Only occurs on Fernandina Island	CR^{IUCN}
Western Santa Cruz Island tortoise		Chelonoidis niger porteri	Only occurs on Western Santa Cruz	CR^{IUCN}
Volcán Alcedo tortoise		Chelonoidis niger vandenburghi	Only occurs on Central Isabela Island on the caldera and southern slopes of Volcán Alcedo	VU^{IUCN}
Iguana Cove tortoise		Chelonoidis niger vicina	Only occurs on Isabela Island's Cerro Azul volcano	EN^{IUCN}
Green sea turtle		Chelonia mydas	Occurs in the water throughout the Galapagos, only sea turtle species that nests in the Galapagos, mainly on Isabela and Santa Cruz Islands.	EN^{IUCN}
Marine iguana		Amblyrhynchus cristatus	Occurs on all islands	VU^{IUCN}
Galápagos land iguana		Conolophus subcristatus	Occurs in the dry lowlands of Fernandina, Isabela, Santa Cruz, North Seymour, Baltra, and the South Plaza Islands	VU^{IUCN}
Galápagos pink land iguana		Conolophus marthae	Only occurs on the Wolf Volcano on Isabela Island	CR^{IUCN}
Santa Fe land iguana		Conolophus pallidus	Only occurs on Santa Fe	VU^{IUCN}
Albemarle lava lizard		Microlophus albemarlensis	Occurs on Isabela, Santa Cruz, Fernandina, Santiago, Santa Fe, North Seymour, Plaza Sur, Daphne Major, and Rábida	LC^{IUCN}
Santa Fe lava lizard		Microlophus barringtonensis	Only occurs on Santa Fe	NT^{IUCN}
San Cristóbal lava lizard		Microlophus bivittatus	Only occurs on San Cristóbal	NT^{IUCN}
Hood lava lizard		Microlophus delanonis	Only occurs on Española	LC^{IUCN}
Pinzón lava lizard		Microlophus duncanensis	Only occurs on Pinzón	NT^{IUCN}
Floreana lava lizard		Microlophus grayii	Occurs on Floreana and nearby Champion, Caldwell, Enderby, and Gardner	NT^{IUCN}
Marchena lava lizard	—N/a	Microlophus habelii	Only occurs on Marchena	LC^{IUCN}
Santa Cruz lava lizard		Microlophus indefatigabilis	Occurs on Santa Cruz, Baltra, and North Seymour	LC^{IUCN}
Santiago lava lizard		Microlophus jacobi	Only occurs on Santiago and nearby Rábida	LC^{IUCN}
Common Pacific iguana		Microlophus pacificus	Only occurs on Pinta	LC^{IUCN}
Galapagos racer		Pseudalsophis biserialis	Only occurs on San Cristóbal and the offshore islands of Champion, Enderby, and Gardner, extirpated from Floreana	NT^{IUCN}
Darwin's racer		Pseudalsophis darwini	Occurs on Fernandina and Isabela, along with Tortuga Islet	LC^{IUCN}
Santa Cruz racer		Pseudalsophis dorsalis	Occurs on Santa Cruz, Santa Fe, Baltra, and North Seymour	LC^{IUCN}
Santiago racer		Pseudalsophis hephaestus	Only occurs on Santiago and nearby Rábida	NT^{IUCN}
Espanola racer		Pseudalsophis hoodensis	Only occurs on Española and nearby Gardner Islet	NT^{IUCN}
Western Galapagos racer		Pseudalsophis occidentalis	Occurs on both Fernandina and Isabela, along with Tortuga and Cowley Islets	LC^{IUCN}
Banded Galapagos racer		Pseudalsophis slevini	Only occurs on Pinzón	VU^{IUCN}
Striped Galapagos racer		Pseudalsophis steindachneri	Occurs in eastern Santa Cruz, along with Baltra and North Seymour	NT^{IUCN}
Thomas' racer		Pseudalsophis thomasi	Only occurs on Santiago and nearby Rábida	NT^{IUCN}
Yellow-bellied sea snake		Hydrophis platuru	Occurs in the waters around Isabela, Santiago, Santa Cruz, San Cristóbal, Española, Floreana, and Genovesa	LC^{IUCN}
Barrington leaf-toed gecko	—N/a	Phyllodactylus barringtonensis	Only occurs on Santa Fe	LC^{IUCN}
Andy Sabin's leaf-toed gecko	—N/a	Phyllodactylus andysabini	Only occurs on the northern and western slopes of Wolf Volcano on Isabela	EN^{IUCN}
Baur's leaf-toed gecko		Phyllodactylus baurii	Only occurs on Floreana and nearby Gardner, Champion, and Enderby	DD^{IUCN}
Darwin's leaf-toed gecko	data-sort-value="" style="background: var(--background-color-interactive, #ececec); color: var(--color-base, inherit); vertical-align: middle; text-align: center; " class="table-na" | —N/a	Phyllodactylus darwini	Only occurs on San Cristóbal and offshore Lobos Islet	NT^{IUCN}
Española leaf-toed gecko	Phyllodactylus gorii	Only occurs on Española and nearby Gardner and Osborn islets	NT^{IUCN}	
Galapagos leaf-toed gecko		Phyllodactylus galapagensis	Occurs on Santa Cruz, Baltra, and North Seymour, along with offshore islands Daphne Major, Guy Fawkes, North Plaza, and South Plaza	NT^{IUCN}
Gilbert's leaf-toed gecko	—N/a	Phyllodactylus gilberti	Only occurs on Darwin and Wolf	DD^{IUCN}
Simpson's leaf-toed gecko	—N/a	Phyllodactylus simpsoni	Occurs on Isabela and Fernandina, along with Tortuga and Cowley Islets	NT^{IUCN}
Pinzón Leaf-toed Gecko	—N/a	Phyllodactylus duncanensis	Only occurs on Pinzón	VU^{IUCN}
Chatham leaf-toed gecko		Phyllodactylus leei	Only occurs on San Cristóbal	NT^{IUCN}
Mares's leaf-toed gecko	—N/a	Phyllodactylus maresi	Occurs on Santiago, Marchena, Rábida, and Bartolomé	NT^{IUCN}
Peters' leaf-toed gecko		Phyllodactylus reissii	Introduced, occurs Isabela, Santa Cruz, Floreana, and San Cristóbal	LC^{IUCN}
Shieldhead gecko		Gonatodes caudiscutatus	Introduced, occurs on Isabela, Santa Cruz, and San Cristóbal	LC^{IUCN}
Asian house gecko		Hemidactylus frenatus	Introduced, occurs on Isabela, Santa Cruz, and San Cristóbal	LC^{IUCN}
Mourning gecko		Lepidodactylus lugubris	Introduced, occurs on Santa Cruz, Floreana, and San Cristóbal	LC^{IUCN}

== Birds ==
Common name	Picture	Scientific name	Distribution and habitat	IUCN status (Note: This column sorts by threat level, as outlined in the key above.)
Black-bellied whistling duck		Dendrocygna autumnalis	Vagrant, one record from Isabela, and one record from Santa Cruz	LC^{IUCN}
Northern shoveler		Spatula clypeata	Vagrant, one record from Isabela	LC^{IUCN}
Blue-winged teal		Spatula discors	Migrant, found on Isabela, San Cristóbal, and Santa Cruz during October-May	LC^{IUCN}
Cinnamon teal		Spatula cyanoptera	Vagrant, one record from Isabela	LC^{IUCN}
White-cheeked pintail		Anas bahamensis galapagensis	Endemic subspecies, occurs on Isabela, Santa Cruz, Santiago, Floreana, San Cristóbal, Fernandina and Genovesa	NT^{IUCN}
Domestic mallard		Anas platyrhynchos domesticus	Introduced, found on Isabela, Santa Cruz, and San Cristóbal	LC^{IUCN}
Masked duck		Nomonyx dominicus	Vagrant, one record from San Cristóbal, and one record from Santa Cruz	LC^{IUCN}
Comb duck		Sarkidiornis sylvicola	Vagrant, one record from Santa Cruz	LC^{IUCN}
Helmeted guineafowl		Numida meleagris	Introduced, found on Santa Cruz, San Cristóbal, and possibly Isabela	LC^{IUCN}
Green peafowl		Pavo muticus	Introduced, possibly found on San Cristóbal	EN^{IUCN}
Common quail		Coturnix coturnix	Introduced, found on Santa Cruz	LC^{IUCN}
Domestic chicken		Gallus gallus domesticus	Introduced, found on Baltra, Floreana, Isabela, San Cristóbal, and Santa Cruz	LC^{IUCN}
Wild turkey		Meleagris gallopavo	Introduced, found on San Cristóbal, Santa Cruz, and possibly Isabela	LC^{IUCN}
Chilean flamingo		Phoenicopterus chilensis	Vagrant, two records from Floreana	NT^{IUCN}
American flamingo		Phoenicopterus ruber glyphorhynchus	Endemic subspecies, occurs on Floreana Island, Isabela Island, Santa Cruz Island, Santiago Island, and Rábida	LC^{IUCN}
Pied-billed grebe		Podilymbus podiceps	Migrant, found on Isabela, Santa Cruz, San Cristóbal, Marchena, and possibly Floreana and Española	LC^{IUCN}
Galapagos dove		Zenaida galapagoensis	Endemic, found on all islands	NT^{IUCN}
Eared dove		Zenaida auriculata	Vagrant, known from a few records in Santa Cruz	LC^{IUCN}
Smooth-billed ani		Crotophaga ani	Introduced, found on Isabela, Fernandina, Floreana, Santa Cruz, Santiago, San Cristóbal, Genovesa, Pinta, Pinzón, Champion, Daphne Major, South Plaza, and Gardner	LC^{IUCN}
Dark-billed cuckoo		Coccyzus melacoryphus	Occurs in Isabela, Fernandina, Santa Cruz, and Santiago	LC^{IUCN}
Black-billed cuckoo		Coccyzus erythropthalmus	Vagrant, one record from Española	LC^{IUCN}
Gray-capped cuckoo		Coccyzus lansbergi	Vagrant, one record from unknown location	LC^{IUCN}
Common nighthawk		Chordeiles minor	Occurs on Española, Isabela, Fernandina, and Santa Cruz	LC^{IUCN}
Chimney swift		Chaetura pelagica	Vagrant, three records on Española	VU^{IUCN}
Purple gallinule		Porphyrio martinica	Occurs on Santa Cruz	LC^{IUCN}
Galapagos rail		Laterallus spilonota	Endemic, occurs on Isabela, Santiago, Santa Cruz, Floreana, San Cristóbal, and Pinta	VU^{IUCN}
Paint-billed crake		Mustelirallus erythrops	Occurs on Santa Cruz, Floreana, San Cristóbal, Isabela, and Genovesa	LC^{IUCN}
Sora		Porzana carolina	Vagrant, one record from Marchena, one record from Santiago, and one record from Genovesa	LC^{IUCN}
Common gallinule		Gallinula galeata	Occurs on all islands	LC^{IUCN}
American coot		Fulica americana	Vagrant, two records from San Cristóbal	LC^{IUCN}
Black-bellied plover		Pluvialis squatarola	Migrant, occurs on all islands throughout the year	LC^{IUCN}
American golden-plover		Pluvialis dominica	Occurs on all islands	LC^{IUCN}
Pacific golden-plover		Pluvialis fulva	Vagrant, one record on Isabela	LC^{IUCN}
Tawny-throated dotterel		Oreopholus ruficollis	Vagrant, one record from Española, and one record from Floreana	LC^{IUCN}
Killdeer		Charadrius vociferus	Vagrant, recorded three times from unknown location	LC^{IUCN}
Semipalmated plover		Charadrius semipalmatus	Migrant, occurs on all islands throughout the year	LC^{IUCN}
Wilson's plover		Anarhynchus wilsonia	Vagrant, three birds recorded on Floreana	NT^{IUCN}
American oystercatcher		Haematopus palliatus galapagensis	Endemic subspecies, found on all islands	LC^{IUCN}
Black-necked stilt		Himantopus mexicanus	Occurs on all islands	NT^{IUCN}
Whimbrel		Numenius phaeopus	Occurs on all islands	LC^{IUCN}
Hudsonian godwit		Limosa haemastica	Vagrant, one record from Isabela and one record from Santa Cruz	VU^{IUCN}
Marbled godwit		Limosa fedoa	Vagrant, one record from Isabela, one record from Santa Cruz, and one record from Genovesa	VU^{IUCN}
Ruddy turnstone		Arenaria interpres	Migrant, found on all islands year-round	NT^{IUCN}
Black turnstone		Arenaria melanocephala	Vagrant, one record from San Cristóbal, and one from an unknown location	LC^{IUCN}
Red knot		Calidris canutus	Vagrant, one record from Floreana, and two records from Isabela	NT^{IUCN}
Surfbird		Calidris virgata	Vagrant, two records from Santiago, two records from Isabela, and one record from San Cristóbal	LC^{IUCN}
Stilt sandpiper		Calidris himantopus	Vagrant, one record from Isabela, and one record from Santa Cruz	NT^{IUCN}
Sanderling		Calidris alba	Migrant, occurs all islands except Pinzón, Genovesa, Wolf, and Darwin, found year-round	LC^{IUCN}
Baird's sandpiper		Calidris bairdii	Vagrant, two records from Santiago, one record from Santa Fe, and one record from Española	LC^{IUCN}
Least sandpiper		Calidris minutilla	Migrant, occurs on Floreana, San Cristóbal, Santa Cruz, and Santiago	NT^{IUCN}
White-rumped sandpiper		Calidris fuscicollis	Vagrant, one record from Fernandina, three records from Floreana, three records from San Cristóbal, one record from Santa Fe, and one record from Santa Cruz	VU^{IUCN}
Buff-breasted sandpiper		Calidris subruficollis	Vagrant, one record from unknown location	VU^{IUCN}
Pectoral sandpiper		Calidris melanotos	Vagrant, two records from Santa Cruz, and one from Santiago	LC^{IUCN}
Semipalmated sandpiper		Calidris pusilla	Vagrant, three records from Floreana	NT^{IUCN}
Western sandpiper		Calidris mauri	Vagrant, one record from Santiago	LC^{IUCN}
Short-billed dowitcher		Limnodromus griseus	Migrant, occurs on Isabela, Santiago, Floreana, San Cristóbal, Santa Cruz, and Genovesa	VU^{IUCN}
Wilson's phalarope		Phalaropus tricolor	Migrant, occurs on Isabela, Floreana, Santiago, Santa Cruz, San Cristóbal Genovesa, and Rábida	LC^{IUCN}
Red-necked phalarope		Phalaropus lobatus	Migrant, occurs on all islands	LC^{IUCN}
Red phalarope		Phalaropus fulicarius	Migrant, occurs on Fernandina, Isabela, Santa Cruz, Santiago, and North Seymour	LC^{IUCN}
Spotted sandpiper		Actitis macularius	Migrant, occurs on Santa Cruz	LC^{IUCN}
Solitary sandpiper		Tringa solitaria	Vagrant, five records from Santa Cruz, one record from San Cristóbal, and one from Fernandina	LC^{IUCN}
Wandering tattler		Tringa incana	Migrant, occurs on all islands	LC^{IUCN}
Greater yellowlegs		Tringa melanoleuca	Migrant, occurs on Santiago, Isabela, Santa Cruz, and Floreana	NT^{IUCN}
Willet		Tringa semipalmata	Migrant, occurs on Isabela, Santa Cruz, Santiago, and Genovesa	LC^{IUCN}
Lesser yellowlegs		Tringa flavipes	Migrant, occurs on Isabela, Floreana, Santa Cruz, Genovesa, San Cristóbal, and Española	VU^{IUCN}
Long-tailed jaeger		Stercorarius longicaudus	Unconfirmed record from unknown location	LC^{IUCN}
Parasitic jaeger		Stercorarius parasiticus	Unconfirmed record from unknown location	LC^{IUCN}
Pomarine jaeger		Stercorarius pomarinus	Accidental, three records from Floreana, one record from Isabela, and one record from Fernandina	LC^{IUCN}
Swallow-tailed gull		Creagrus furcatus	Near-endemic, occurs on all islands	LC^{IUCN}
Gray-hooded gull		Chroicocephalus cirrocephalus	Vagrant, one record from San Cristóbal, one record from Isabela, and one record from Santa Cruz	LC^{IUCN}
Little gull		Hydrocoloeus minutus	Vagrant, one recorded on San Cristóbal	LC^{IUCN}
Laughing gull		Leucophaeus atricilla	Migrant, occurs on all islands	LC^{IUCN}
Franklin's gull		Leucophaeus pipixcan	Migrant, occurs on all islands	LC^{IUCN}
Lava gull		Leucophaeus fuliginosus	Endemic, occurs on all islands	VU^{IUCN}
Grey gull		Leucophaeus modestus	Vagrant, two records from Floreana	LC^{IUCN}
Ring-billed gull		Larus delawarensis	Vagrant, one record on South Plaza	LC^{IUCN}
Kelp gull		Larus dominicanus	Vagrant, one recorded on Isabela, one recorded on Santa Cruz	LC^{IUCN}
Belcher's gull		Larus belcheri	Vagrant, one recorded on San Cristóbal	LC^{IUCN}
Brown noddy		Anous stolidus galapagensis	Endemic subspecies, occurs on all islands	LC^{IUCN}
Blue noddy		Anous ceruleus	Vagrant, one record on San Cristóbal	LC^{IUCN}
Black tern		Chlidonias niger	Vagrant, one recorded on Santiago	LC^{IUCN}
White tern		Gygis alba	Vagrant, one recorded on Genovesa, and four recorded on Santa Cruz	LC^{IUCN}
Sooty tern		Onychoprion fuscatus	Occurs on all islands, but solely breeds on Darwin	LC^{IUCN}
Inca tern		Larosterna inca	Vagrant, One record from Fernandina, one record from Isabela, one record from Española, two records from San Cristóbal, one record from Daphne Major, and one record from Floreana	NT^{IUCN}
Elegant tern		Thalasseus elegans	Vagrant, one from Isabela, and one record from San Cristóbal	NT^{IUCN}
Royal tern		Thalasseus maximus	Migrant, found on Isabela, Santa Cruz, and San Cristóbal	LC^{IUCN}
Sandwich tern		Thalasseus sandvicensis	Vagrant, one record from Isabela	LC^{IUCN}
Common tern		Sterna hirundo	Migrant, occurs on all Isabela, and Española	LC^{IUCN}
Red-billed tropicbird		Phaethon aethereus	Occurs on all islands	LC^{IUCN}
Red-tailed tropicbird		Phaethon rubricauda	Vagrant, one record from unknown location	LC^{IUCN}
Galapagos penguin		Spheniscus mendiculus	Endemic, occurs on Isabela, Fernandina, Floreana, Santa Cruz, and Bartolomé	EN^{IUCN}
Southern royal albatross		Diomedea epomophora	Occurs on of Pinta and Española	VU^{IUCN}
Wandering albatross		Diomedea exulans	Occurs on Pinta and Española	VU^{IUCN}
Waved albatross		Phoebastria irrorata	Endemic, occurs on all islands, breeds only on Española and Genovesa	CR^{IUCN}
Black-footed albatross		Phoebastria nigripes	Vagrant, one record from Santa Cruz	NT^{IUCN}
Black-browed albatross		Thalassarche melanophris	Vagrant, one record from unknown location	NT^{IUCN}
White-bellied storm-petrel		Fregetta grallaria	Vagrant, one record from Isabela	LC^{IUCN}
Elliot's storm-petrel		Oceanites gracilis galapagoensis	Endemic subspecies, occurs on all islands	DD^{IUCN}
White-faced storm-petrel		Pelagodroma marina	Vagrant, a few records from Isabela	LC^{IUCN}
Wedge-rumped storm-petrel		Hydrobates tethys tethys	Endemic subspecies, occurs on all islands, nests on Genovesa, Pitt Islet, and possibly Redonda Rock	LC^{IUCN}
Ringed storm petrel		Hydrobates hornbyi	Vagrant, one record from Floreana	NT^{IUCN}
Band-rumped storm-petrel		Hydrobates castro	Occurs on all islands	LC^{IUCN}
Leach's storm-petrel		Hydrobates leucorhoa	Vagrant, two records from Genovesa, one record from Española, one record from Floreana, and one from Wolf	VU^{IUCN}
Markham's storm-petrel		Hydrobates markhami	Vagrant, one record from Isabela, one record from Santa Cruz, and one record from Fernandina	NT^{IUCN}
Black storm-petrel		Hydrobates melania	Vagrant, one record from Isabela, and one record from Santa Cruz	LC^{IUCN}
Northern giant petrel		Macronectes halli	Vagrant, one record from Española	LC^{IUCN}
Cape petrel		Daption capense	Vagrant, thirteen records from across the islands	LC^{IUCN}
Mottled petrel		Pterodroma inexpectata	Vagrant, one record from San Cristóbal	NT^{IUCN}
Galapagos petrel		Pterodroma phaeopygia	Endemic, occurs on all islands, breeds on Santa Cruz, San Cristóbal, Santiago, Floreana and Isabela	CR^{IUCN}
Juan Fernández petrel		Pterodroma externa	Vagrant, one record from Santiago	VU^{IUCN}
Antarctic prion		Pachyptila desolata	Vagrant, one record from Floreana	LC^{IUCN}
Parkinson's petrel		Procellaria parkinsoni	Vagrant, one record from Isabela	VU^{IUCN}
Wedge-tailed shearwater		Ardenna pacificus	Vagrant, one record from unknown location	LC^{IUCN}
Sooty shearwater		Ardenna griseus	Occurs on Santa Cruz, Isabela, and Fernandina	NT^{IUCN}
Pink-footed shearwater		Ardenna creatopus	Vagrant, one record from Isabela	VU^{IUCN}
Flesh-footed shearwater		Ardenna carneipes	Vagrant, one record from unknown location	NT^{IUCN}
Christmas shearwater		Puffinus navtitatis	Vagrant, one record from Santa Cruz	LC^{IUCN}
Galapagos shearwater		Puffinus subalaris	Endemic, occurs on all islands	LC^{IUCN}
Magnificent frigatebird		Fregata magnificens magnificens	Endemic subspecies, occurs on all islands, breeds on North Seymour, Isabela, San Cristóbal, Daphne Minor, Darwin, Genovesa, and Gardner	LC^{IUCN}
Great frigatebird		Fregata minor	Occurs on Floreana, Española, Tortuga, Cuatro Hermanos, San Cristóbal, Genovesa, Darwin, Wolf, Daphne Major, and Gardner	LC^{IUCN}
Blue-footed booby		Sula nebouxii excisa	Endemic subspecies, occurs on all islands	LC^{IUCN}
Peruvian booby		Sula variegata	Vagrant, one record from San Cristóbal	LC^{IUCN}
Nazca booby		Sula granti	Occurs on all islands	LC^{IUCN}
Red-footed booby		Sula sula	Occurs on all islands, breeds on Genovesa, Wolf, Darwin, Gardner, Pitt Point, and Pitt Islet	LC^{IUCN}
Brown booby		Sula leucogaster	Vagrant, one record from San Cristóbal	LC^{IUCN}
Masked booby		Sula dactylatra	Vagrant, one record from Santa Cruz	LC^{IUCN}
Flightless cormorant		Phalacrocorax harrisi	Endemic, occurs on Fernandina and Isabela	VU^{IUCN}
Brown pelican		Pelecanus occidentalis urinator	Endemic subspecies, occurs on all islands	LC^{IUCN}
Tricolored heron		Egretta tricolor	Vagrant, one record from Genovesa	LC^{IUCN}
Snowy egret		Egretta thula	Occurs on Santa Cruz, Isabela, and Floreana	LC^{IUCN}
Little blue heron		Egretta caerulea	Occurs on Isabela, Fernandina, Santa Cruz	LC^{IUCN}
Yellow-crowned night-heron		Nyctanassa violacea pauper	Endemic subspecies, occurs on all islands	LC^{IUCN}
Lava heron		Butorides sundevalli	Endemic, occurs on all islands	LC^{IUCN}
Green heron		Butorides virescens	Vagrant, one record from Floreana	LC^{IUCN}
Cattle egret		Bubulcus ibis	Occurs on Floreana, Isabela, San Cristóbal, Santa Cruz	LC^{IUCN}
Great egret		Ardea alba	Occurs on Isabela and Santa Cruz	LC^{IUCN}
Great blue heron		Ardea herodias cognata	Endemic subspecies, occurs on all islands	LC^{IUCN}
Osprey		Pandion haliaetus	Occurs on Isabela, Fernandina, San Cristóbal, and Santa Cruz	LC^{IUCN}
Galapagos hawk		Buteo galapagoensis	Endemic, occurs on all islands except Wolf, Darwin, and Genovesa	VU^{IUCN}
American barn-owl		Tyto furcata punctatissima	Endemic subspecies, occurs on Isabela, Fernandina, Santa Cruz, and San Cristóbal	LC^{IUCN}
Short-eared owl		Asio flammeus galapagoensis	Endemic subspecies, occurs on all islands except Wolf	LC^{IUCN}
Belted kingfisher		Megaceryle alcyon	Occurs on Santa Cruz, Daphne Major, Genovesa, Española, Isabela, and Floreana	LC^{IUCN}
Peregrine falcon		Falco peregrinus	Migrant, occurs on all islands November-March	LC^{IUCN}
Red-masked parakeet		Psittacara erythrogenys	Introduced, occurs on San Cristóbal	NT^{IUCN}
Fork-tailed flycatcher		Tyrannus savana	Vagrant, one record on San Cristóbal	LC^{IUCN}
Eastern kingbird		Tyrannus tyrannus	Vagrant, one record on Genovesa, and one record on Santa Fe	LC^{IUCN}
Galapagos flycatcher		Myiarchus magnirostris	Endemic, occurs on all islands except Genovesa	LC^{IUCN}
San Cristóbal flycatcher		Pyrocephalus dubius	Extinct, formerly San Cristóbal	EX^{IUCN}
Brujo flycatcher		Pyrocephalus nanus	Endemic, occurs on all islands except Baltra, Española, Genovesa and San Cristóbal	NT^{IUCN}
Red-eyed vireo		Vireo olivaceus	Vagrant, one record from Wolf	LC^{IUCN}
Brown-chested martin		Progne tapera	Vagrant, one record from Española	LC^{IUCN}
Purple martin		Progne subis	Vagrant, at least five records from Española, and two on Santa Cruz	LC^{IUCN}
Galapagos martin		Progne modesta	Endemic, occurs on all islands except Wolf and Darwin	EN^{IUCN}
Bank swallow		Riparia riparia	Vagrant, one record from Española, one record from Genovesa, and one record from San Cristóbal	LC^{IUCN}
Barn swallow		Hirundo rustica	Migrant, occurs on Española, Santa Fe, Floreana, and Santa Cruz	LC^{IUCN}
Cliff swallow		Petrochelidon pyrrhonota	Vagrant, two records from Española	LC^{IUCN}
Cedar waxwing		Bombycilla cedrorum	Vagrant, two records from Genovesa	LC^{IUCN}
Swainson's thrush		Catharus ustulatus	Vagrant, one record from Santa Cruz	LC^{IUCN}
Galapagos mockingbird		Mimus parvulus	Endemic, occurs on Santa Cruz, Santa Fe, Santiago, Isabela, Fernandina, Pinta, Marchena, Genovesa, Darwin, Wolf, and Pinta	LC^{IUCN}
Floreana mockingbird		Mimus trifasciatus	Endemic, only occurs on Champion and Gardner, extinct on Floreana	EN^{IUCN}
Española mockingbird		Mimus macdonaldi	Endemic, only occurs on Española	VU^{IUCN}
San Cristóbal mockingbird		Mimus melanotis	Endemic, only occurs on San Cristóbal	NT^{IUCN}
Bobolink		Dolichonyx oryzivorus	Migrant, July-August and October-December, found on Genovesa, Española, Santiago, Floreana, San Cristóbal, Santa Cruz, Pinta and Bartolomé	LC^{IUCN}
Great-tailed grackle		Quiscalus mexicanus	Vagrant, one record from Santa Cruz	LC^{IUCN}
Northern waterthrush		Parkesia noveboracensis	Vagrant, one record from Santa Cruz	LC^{IUCN}
Prothonotary warbler		Protonotaria citrea	Vagrant, several records from Daphne Major and Española	LC^{IUCN}
American redstart		Setophaga ruticilla	Vagrant, one record from Santa Fe	LC^{IUCN}
Yellow warbler		Setophaga petechia aureola	Endemic subspecies, occurs on all islands	LC^{IUCN}
Blackpoll warbler		Setophaga striata	Vagrant, one record from Daphne Major	NT^{IUCN}
Summer tanager		Piranga rubra	Vagrant, one record on Española, one record from Daphne Major, one record from Baltra, one record from Wolf, and one record from Bartolomé	LC^{IUCN}
Scarlet tanager		Piranga olivacea	Vagrant, one record from Floreana, and a possible record from Santa Cruz	LC^{IUCN}
Rose-breasted grosbeak		Pheucticus ludovicianus	Vagrant, two records from Genovesa	LC^{IUCN}
Indigo bunting		Passerina cyanea	Vagrant, one record from Daphne Major	LC^{IUCN}
Bananaquit		Coereba flaveola	Vagrant, one record from unknown location	LC^{IUCN}
Green warbler-finch		Certhidea olivacea	Endemic, occurs on Pinzón, Fernandina, Isabela, Rábida, Santa Cruz, and Santiago	VU^{IUCN}
Gray warbler-finch		Certhidea fusca	Endemic, occurs on Darwin, Wolf, Española, Santa Fe, San Cristóbal, Pinta, and Floreana	LC^{IUCN}
Vegetarian finch		Platyspiza crassirostris	Endemic, occurs on Isabela, Fernandina, Floreana, San Cristóbal, Santa Cruz, Santa Fe, Daphne Major, Pinta, Pinzón, and Rábida	LC^{IUCN}
Woodpecker finch		Camarhynchus pallidus	Endemic, occurs on Isabela, Santa Cruz, Fernandina, Santiago, and Pinzón. Birds on San Cristóbal may represent a distinct species	VU^{IUCN}
Large tree finch		Camarhynchus psittacula	Endemic, occurs on Isabela, Floreana, Fernandina, San Cristóbal, and Santa Cruz, extinct on Santa Fe and Pinzón	VU^{IUCN}
Medium tree finch		Camarhynchus pauper	Endemic, occurs on Floreana	CR^{IUCN}
Small tree finch		Camarhynchus parvulus	Endemic, occurs on Isabela, Fernandina, Santa Cruz, Santiago, San Cristóbal, Floreana, Baltra, Santa Fe, Pinzón and Rábida	LC^{IUCN}
Mangrove finch		Camarhynchus heliobates	Endemic, occurs on Playa Tortuga Negra, Caleta Black and Cartago, extinct on Fernandina	CR^{IUCN}
Sharp-beaked ground-finch		Geospiza difficilis	Endemic, occurs on Santiago, Fernandina and Pinta, extinct on Floreana, Santa Cruz, San Cristóbal and possibly Isabela	LC^{IUCN}
Vampire ground-finch		Geospiza septentrionalis	Endemic, only occurs on Darwin	VU^{IUCN}
Small ground-finch		Geospiza fuliginosa	Endemic, occurs on all islands besides Genovesa, Darwin, and Wolf	LC^{IUCN}
Medium ground-finch		Geospiza fortis	Endemic, occurs on all islands besides Genovesa and Darwin, extinct on Wolf and Española	LC^{IUCN}
Genovesa cactus-finch		Geospiza propinqua	Endemic, only occurs on Genovesa	VU^{IUCN}
Genovesa ground-finch		Geospiza acutirostris	Endemic, only occurs on Genovesa	VU^{IUCN}
Common cactus-finch		Geospiza scandens	Endemic, occurs on all islands besides Fernandina, possibly extinct on Pinzón	LC^{IUCN}
Large ground-finch		Geospiza magnirostris	Endemic, occurs on islands besides Darwin and Española, possibly extinct on Floreana	LC^{IUCN}
Española cactus-finch		Geospiza conirostris	Endemic, only occurs on Española	VU^{IUCN}

== Fish ==
=== Sharks ===
Common name	Picture	Scientific name	Distribution and habitat	IUCN status (Note: This column sorts by threat level, as outlined in the key above.)
Galapagos bullhead shark		Heterodontus quoyi		LC^{IUCN}
Whale shark		Rhincodon typus		VU^{IUCN}
Pelagic thresher		Alopias pelagicus		EN^{IUCN}
Bigeye thresher		Alopias superciliosus		VU^{IUCN}
Shortfin mako shark		Isurus oxyrinchus		EN^{IUCN}
Smalltooth sand tiger		Odontaspis ferox		EN^{IUCN}
Longnose catshark	—N/a	Apristurus kampae		DD^{IUCN}
Panama ghost catshark	—N/a	Apristurus stenseni		LC^{IUCN}
Jaguar catshark		Bythaelurus giddingsi		LC^{IUCN}
White-margin fin smooth-hound	—N/a	Mustelus albipinnis		LC^{IUCN}
Speckled smooth-hound		Mustelus mento		CR^{IUCN}
Spotted houndshark		Triakis maculata		CR^{IUCN}
Silvertip shark		Carcharhinus albimarginatus		VU^{IUCN}
Graceful shark		Carcharhinus amblyrhynchos		VU^{IUCN}
Silky shark		Carcharhinus falciformis		VU^{IUCN}
Bull shark		Carcharhinus leucas		VU^{IUCN}
Galapagos shark		Carcharhinus galapagensis		LC^{IUCN}
Blacktip shark		Carcharhinus limbatus		VU^{IUCN}
Oceanic whitetip shark		Carcharhinus longimanus		CR^{IUCN}
Dusky shark		Carcharhinus obscurus		EN^{IUCN}
Sandbar shark		Carcharhinus plumbeus		EN^{IUCN}
Whitenose shark		Nasolamia velox		EN^{IUCN}
Blue shark		Prionace glauca		NT^{IUCN}
Whitetip reef shark		Triaenodon obesus		VU^{IUCN}
Tiger shark		Galeocerdo cuvier		NT^{IUCN}
Scalloped hammerhead		Sphyrna lewini		CR^{IUCN}
Great hammerhead		Sphyrna mokarran		CR^{IUCN}
Bonnethead		Sphyrna tiburo		EN^{IUCN}
Smooth hammerhead		Sphyrna zygaena		VU^{IUCN}
Bluntnose sixgill shark		Hexanchus griseus		NT^{IUCN}
Broadnose sevengill shark		Notorynchus cepedianus		VU^{IUCN}
Cookiecutter shark		Isistius brasiliensis		LC^{IUCN}
Combtooth dogfish		Centroscyllium nigrum		LC^{IUCN}
Leafscale gulper shark		Centrophorus squamosus		EN^{IUCN}
Prickly shark		Echinorhinus cookei		DD^{IUCN}

=== Electric Rays ===
Common name	Picture	Scientific name	Distribution and habitat	IUCN status (Note: This column sorts by threat level, as outlined in the key above.)
Chilean torpedo	—N/a	Tetronarce tremens		LC^{IUCN}

=== Guitarfish ===
Common name	Picture	Scientific name	Distribution and habitat	IUCN status (Note: This column sorts by threat level, as outlined in the key above.)
Flathead guitarfish		Pseudobatos planiceps		LC^{IUCN}

=== Skates ===
Common name	Picture	Scientific name	Distribution and habitat	IUCN status (Note: This column sorts by threat level, as outlined in the key above.)
Galápagos Skate	—N/a	Rajella eisenhardti		LC^{IUCN}
Velez Skate	—N/a	Rostroraja velezi		VU^{IUCN}
Deepsea skate		Bathyraja abyssicola		LC^{IUCN}
Peruvian skate	—N/a	Bathyraja peruana		LC^{IUCN}
Richardson's ray		Bathyraja richardsoni		LC^{IUCN}
Pacific white skate		Bathyraja spinosissima		LC^{IUCN}
Dusky finless skate	—N/a	Gurgesiella furvescens		LC^{IUCN}

=== Rays ===
Common name	Picture	Scientific name	Distribution and habitat	IUCN status (Note: This column sorts by threat level, as outlined in the key above.)
Diamond stingray		Hypanus dipterurus		VU^{IUCN}
Longtail stingray		Hypanus longus		VU^{IUCN}
Pelagic stingray		Pteroplatytrygon violacea		LC^{IUCN}
Round ribbontail ray		Taeniurops meyeni		VU^{IUCN}
Pacific chupare		Styracura pacifica		VU^{IUCN}
Pacific white-spotted eagle ray		Aetobatus laticeps		VU^{IUCN}
Spotted eagle ray		Aetobatus narinari		EN^{IUCN}
Roughskin Bullray		Aetomylaeus asperrimus		DD^{IUCN}
Longnose eagle ray	—N/a	Myliobatis longirostris		VU^{IUCN}
Peruvian eagle ray		Myliobatis peruvianus		VU^{IUCN}
Golden cownose ray		Rhinoptera steindachneri		NT^{IUCN}
Giant oceanic manta ray		Mobula birostris		EN^{IUCN}
Devil fish		Mobula mobular		CR^{IUCN}
Munk's devil ray		Mobula munkiana		VU^{IUCN}
Chilean devil ray		Mobula tarapacana		CR^{IUCN}
Bentfin devil ray		Mobula thurstoni		EN^{IUCN}

=== Chimaeras ===
Common name	Picture	Scientific name	Distribution and habitat	IUCN status (Note: This column sorts by threat level, as outlined in the key above.)
Whitespot ghost shark		Hydrolagus alphus		LC^{IUCN}
Galápagos ghostshark	—N/a	Hydrolagus mccoskeri		LC^{IUCN}

=== Notable fish of the Galápagos ===
Common name	Picture	Scientific name	Distribution and habitat	IUCN status (Note: This column sorts by threat level, as outlined in the key above.)
Giant sunfish		Mola alexandrini		NE^{IUCN}
Bluespotted Cornetfish		Fistularia commersonii		LC^{IUCN}
Pacific seahorse		Hippocampus ingens		VU^{IUCN}
Red-lipped batfish		Ogcocephalus darwini		LC^{IUCN}
Galápagos four-eyed blenny	—N/a	Dialommus fuscus		VU^{IUCN}
Bravo clinid		Gobioclinus dendriticus		VU^{IUCN}
Jenkin's blenny	—N/a	Labrisomus jenkinsi		VU^{IUCN}
Belted blenny	—N/a	Malacoctenus zonogaster		VU^{IUCN}
Galapagos blenny		Malacoctenus zonogaster		VU^{IUCN}
Galapagos triplefin blenny		Lepidonectes corallicola		VU^{IUCN}
Galapagos barnacle blenny		Acanthemblemaria castroi		VU^{IUCN}
Yellow-mouth pikeblenny	—N/a	Chaenopsis schmitti		VU^{IUCN}
Panamic fanged blenny		Ophioblennius steindachneri		LC^{IUCN}
Blacktip cardinalfish		Apogon atradorsatus		LC^{IUCN}
Speckled moray eel		Gymnothorax dovii		LC^{IUCN}
Zebra moray		Gymnomuraena zebra		LC^{IUCN}
Jewel moray		Muraena lentiginosa		LC^{IUCN}
Tiger snake eel		Myrichthys maculosus		LC^{IUCN}
Galapagos garden eel		Heteroconger klausewitzi		LC^{IUCN}
Flathead grey mullet		Mugil cephalus		LC^{IUCN}
Blue and gold snapper		Lutjanus viridis		LC^{IUCN}
Forbe's grunt		Orthopristis forbesi		LC^{IUCN}
Golden-eye grunt		Haemulon scudderii		LC^{IUCN}
Black-striped salema		Brachygenys jessiae		VU^{IUCN}
Galápagos seabream		Archosargus pourtalesii		LC^{IUCN}
King angelfish		Holacanthus passer		LC^{IUCN}
Moorish idol		Zanclus cornutus		LC^{IUCN}
Goldrim surgeonfish		Acanthurus nigricans		LC^{IUCN}
Razor surgeonfish		Prionurus laticlavius		LC^{IUCN}
Yellowtail surgeonfish		Prionurus punctatus		LC^{IUCN}
Three-banded Butterflyfish		Chaetodon robustus		LC^{IUCN}
Blacknosed butterflyfish		Johnrandallia nigrirostris		LC^{IUCN}
Guineafowl puffer		Arothron meleagris		LC^{IUCN}
Spotfin Burrfish		Chilomycterus reticulatus		LC^{IUCN}
Long-spine porcupinefish		Diodon holocanthus		LC^{IUCN}
Narrow-headed puffer		Sphoeroides angusticeps		LC^{IUCN}
Bullseye puffer		Sphoeroides annulatus		LC^{IUCN}
Spotted sharpnose puffer		Canthigaster punctatissima		LC^{IUCN}
Finescale triggerfish		Balistes polylepis		LC^{IUCN}
Orangeside triggerfish		Sufflamen verres		LC^{IUCN}
Leather bass		Dermatolepis dermatolepis		LC^{IUCN}
Starry grouper		Epinephelus labriformis		LC^{IUCN}
Sailfin grouper		Mycteroperca olfax		VU^{IUCN}
Pacific creolefish		Paranthias colonus		LC^{IUCN}
Pacific spotted scorpionfish		Scorpaena mystes		LC^{IUCN}
Galápagos sea robin		Prionotus miles		LC^{IUCN}
Barred serrano		Serranus psittacinus		LC^{IUCN}
Blue-barred parrotfish		Scarus ghobban		LC^{IUCN}
Ember parrotfish		Scarus rubroviolaceus		LC^{IUCN}
Mexican hogfish		Bodianus diplotaenia		LC^{IUCN}
Galápagos razorfish		Xyrichtys victori		LC^{IUCN}
Harlequin tuskfish		Choerodon fasciatus		LC^{IUCN}
Harlequin wrasse		Bodianus eclancheri		LC^{IUCN}
Cortez rainbow wrasse		Thalassoma lucasanum		LC^{IUCN}
Scissortail damsel		Azurina atrilobata		LC^{IUCN}
Galápagos damsel		Azurina eupalama		CR^{IUCN}
Pacific sergeant major		Abudefduf troschelii		LC^{IUCN}
Giant damselfish		Microspathodon dorsalis		LC^{IUCN}
Galápagos gregory		Stegastes arcifrons		LC^{IUCN}
Galápagos ringtail damselfish		Stegastes beebei		LC^{IUCN}
Coral hawkfish		Cirrhitichthys oxycephalus		LC^{IUCN}
Giant hawkfish		Cirrhitus rivulatus		LC^{IUCN}
Bloody frogfish		Abantennarius sanguineus		LC^{IUCN}

== Insects ==
=== Notable beetles (Coleoptera) of the Galápagos ===
Common name	Picture	Scientific name	Distribution and habitat	IUCN status (Note: This column sorts by threat level, as outlined in the key above.)
		Aegomorphus galapagoensis	Occurs on Isabela, San Cristóbal, and Santa Cruz	NE^{IUCN}
		Eburia lanigera	Occurs on Baltra, Campéon, Eden, Española, Fernandina, Floreana, Gardner (as Española), Genovesa, Isabela, Marchena, Pinta, Pinzón, Rábida, San Cristóbal, Santa Cruz, Santa Fé, Santiago, and Seymour	NE^{IUCN}
		Eburia pilosa	Occurs on Isabela, San Cristóbal, Santa Cruz, and Santiago	NE^{IUCN}
		Mallodon chevrolatii	Occurs on San Cristóbal, Santa Cruz, and Santiago	NE^{IUCN}
Darwin's caterpillar hunter		Calosoma granatense	Occurs on Baltra, Darwin, Eden, Española, Fernandina, Floreana, Gardner near Española, Genovesa, Isabela, Marchena, Pinta, Pinzón, Rábida, San Cristóbal, Santa Cruz, Santa Fe, Santiago, Seymour, and Wolf	NE^{IUCN}
Lateral-lined water beetle		Tropisternus lateralis	Occurs on Baltra, Española, Floreana, Genovesa, Isabela, San Cristóbal, Santa Cruz, and Santiago	NE^{IUCN}
Six-spotted zigzag lady beetle		Cheilomenes sexmaculata	Introduced, occurs on Baltra, Floreana, Isabela, Santiago, Santa Cruz, and San Cristóbal	NE^{IUCN}
Spotless lady beetle		Cycloneda sanguinea	Occurs on Española, Fernandina, Floreana, Genovesa, Isabela, Marchena, Pinta, Pinzón, Rábida, Santa Cruz, San Cristóbal, Santiago, Wolf	NE^{IUCN}
Mango flower beetle		Protaetia fusca	Introduced, occurs on San Cristóbal and Santa Cruz	NE^{IUCN}
Giant mealworm beetle		Zophobas atratus	Occurs on Isabela, San Cristóbal, and Santa Cruz	NE^{IUCN}
		Brentus cylindrus	Occurs on Isabela and Santa Cruz	NE^{IUCN}
		Galapaganus howdenae	Occurs on Santa Cruz	NE^{IUCN}
Small banana weevil		Polytus mellerborgi	Introduced, occurs on Floreana, Isabela, Santa Cruz, and San Cristóbal	NE^{IUCN}

=== Notable ants, bees, wasps, and sawflies (Hymenoptera) of the Galápagos ===
Common name	Picture	Scientific name	Distribution and habitat	IUCN status (Note: This column sorts by threat level, as outlined in the key above.)
Galápagos Carpenter Bee		Xylocopa darwini	Endemic, occurs on Isabela, Fernandina, Floreana, Santiago, Santa Cruz, San Cristóbal, Española, Santa Fé, North Seymour, Baltra, Genovesa, and Rábida	NE^{IUCN}
		Megachile pusilla	Occurs on Isabela, Santa Cruz, and San Cristóbal	NE^{IUCN}
Twenty-two-spotted woolcarder		Anthidium vigintiduopunctatum	Occurs on Isabela, Floreana, Santa Cruz, and San Cristóbal	NE^{IUCN}
Blue-eyed ensign wasp		Evania appendigaster	Introduced, occurs on Isabela, Floreana, Santa Cruz, and San Cristóbal	NE^{IUCN}
Variegated Paper Wasp		Polistes versicolor	Introduced, occurs on all islands	NE^{IUCN}
		Bicyrtes variegatus	Occurs on Daphne major, Española, Fernandina, Floreana, Santa Cruz, Santiago, San Cristóbal	NE^{IUCN}
		Brachygastra lecheguana	Introduced, occurs on Santa Cruz, San Cristóbal, Floreana, and Genovesa	NE^{IUCN}
Galapagos carpenter ant		Camponotus macilentus	Endemic, occurs on Baltra, Bartolomé , Cousin, Fernandina, Floreana, Isabela, Marchena, Pinzon, South Plaza, Rábida, Santiago, San Cristóbal, Santa Cruz, North Seymour and Santa Fé	NE^{IUCN}
		Camponotus planus	Endemic, occurs on all islands	NE^{IUCN}
Longhorn crazy ant		Paratrechina longicornis	Introduced, occurs on all islands	NE^{IUCN}
		Odontomachus bauri	Introduced, occurs on Floreana, Isabela, San Cristóbal, Santa Cruz	NE^{IUCN}

=== Notable butterflies and moths (Lepidoptera) of the Galápagos ===
Common name	Picture	Scientific name	Distribution and habitat	IUCN status (Note: This column sorts by threat level, as outlined in the key above.)
Queen		Danaus gilippus	Occurs on Isabella, Fernandina, Santiago, Santa Cruz, Floreana, San Cristóbal, Rábida, Baltra, and North Seymour	LC^{IUCN}
Monarch butterfly		Danaus plexippus	Occurs on Isabela, Santiago, Santa Cruz, Floreana, San Cristóbal, and Baltra	LC^{IUCN}
Marcellina sulphur		Phoebis marcellina	Occurs on Isabela, Santiago, Santa Cruz, San Cristóbal, Santa Fé, Baltra, and North Seymour	NE^{IUCN}
Dorantes longtail		Cecropterus dorantes	Occurs on all islands	NE^{IUCN}
Galápagos Silver Fritillary		Dione galapagensis	Endemic, occurs on Isabela, Santiago, and Santa Cruz	NE^{IUCN}
Western painted lady		Vanessa carye	Occurs on San Cristóbal	NE^{IUCN}
American lady		Vanessa virginiensis	Occurs on Isabela and Santa Cruz	LC^{IUCN}
Ramon blue		Hemiargus ramon	Occurs on Isabela, Santiago, Santa Cruz, Floreana, San Cristóbal, Española, Santa Fé, Baltra, and North Seymour	NE^{IUCN}
Galápagos Blue		Leptotes parrhasioides	Endemic, occurs on Isabela, Santiago, Santa Cruz, Floreana, San Cristóbal, Santa Fé, Baltra, and Pinzón	NE^{IUCN}
Green-banded urania		Urania leilus	Occurs on Santa Cruz	NE^{IUCN}
Pink-spotted hawkmoth		Agrius cingulata	Occurs on Isabela, Santiago, Santa Cruz, Floreana, San Cristóbal, Rábida, Genovesa, Baltra, and North Seymour	NE^{IUCN}
Mournful sphinx		Enyo lugubris delanoi	Endemic subspecies, occurs on Isabela, Santiago, Santa Cruz, San Cristóbal, Floreana, Fernandina, Santa Fé, Rábida, and North Seymour	NE^{IUCN}
Ello Sphinx		Erinnyis ello encantada	Endemic subspecies, occurs on Isabela, Santiago, Santa Cruz, San Cristóbal, Floreana, Santa Fé, and Rábida	NE^{IUCN}
Banded sphinx		Eumorpha fasciata tupaci	Endemic subspecies, occurs on Santa Cruz, San Cristóbal, and Floreana	NE^{IUCN}
Gaudy sphinx		Eumorpha labruscae yupanquii	Endemic subspecies, occurs on Isabela, Santa Cruz, San Cristóbal, Fernandina, and Floreana	NE^{IUCN}
White-lined sphinx		Hyles lineata	Occurs on all islands	NE^{IUCN}
Rustic sphinx		Manduca rustica galapagensis	Endemic subspecies, occurs on all islands	NE^{IUCN}
Black witch		Ascalapha odorata	Occurs on Isabela, Santa Cruz, San Cristóbal, Floreana, and Fernandina	NE^{IUCN}
Somber carpet		Disclisioprocta stellata	Introduced, occurs on all islands	NE^{IUCN}
Indomitable graphic moth		Melipotis indomita	Occurs on all islands	NE^{IUCN}
Ornate bella moth		Utetheisa ornatrix	Occurs on all islands	NE^{IUCN}
		Atteva hysginiella	Endemic, occurs on all islands	NE^{IUCN}
Orange-spotted flower moth		Syngamia florella	Introduced, occurs on Isabela, Santiago, Santa Cruz, San Cristóbal, Floreana, Fernandina, and Genovesa	NE^{IUCN}
Hawaiian beet webworm moth		Spoladea recurvalis	Introduced, occurs on Isabela, Santiago, Santa Cruz, San Cristóbal, Floreana, Española, and Baltra	NE^{IUCN}
		Aetole galapagoensis	Endemic, occurs on Isabela, Santa Cruz, San Cristóbal, Santiago, Floreana, Fernandina, Genovesa, Española, and North Seymour	NE^{IUCN}

=== Notable dragonflies and damselflies (Odonata) of the Galápagos ===
Common name	Picture	Scientific name	Distribution and habitat	IUCN status (Note: This column sorts by threat level, as outlined in the key above.)
Amazon Darner		Anax amazili	Occurs on Isabela, Santiago, Santa Cruz, San Cristóbal, Floreana, and Bartolomé	LC^{IUCN}
Tawny Pennant		Brachymesia herbida	Occurs on Isabela, Santa Cruz, San Cristóbal, and Fernandina	LC^{IUCN}
Great pondhawk		Erythemis vesiculosa	Occurs on Isabela, Santiago, Santa Cruz, and San Cristóbal	LC^{IUCN}
Citrine Forktail		Ischnura hastata	Occurs on Isabela, Santiago, Santa Cruz, and San Cristóbal	LC^{IUCN}
Marl pennant		Macrodiplax balteata	Occurs on Isabela and Santa Cruz	NE^{IUCN}
Wandering Glider		Pantala flavescens	Occurs on Isabela, Santiago, Santa Cruz, San Cristóbal, Floreana, and Baltra	LC^{IUCN}
Spot-winged glider		Pantala hymenaea	Occurs on Isabela, Santiago, Santa Cruz, Floreana, and Española	LC^{IUCN}
		Rhionaeschna galapagoensis	Endemic, occurs on Isabela, Santa Cruz, and San Cristóbal	EN^{IUCN}
Striped Saddlebags		Tramea darwini	Occurs on all islands	NE^{IUCN}

=== Notable grasshoppers, crickets, and katydids (Orthoptera) of the Galápagos ===
Common name	Picture	Scientific name	Distribution and habitat	IUCN status (Note: This column sorts by threat level, as outlined in the key above.)
Large painted locust		Schistocerca melanocera	Endemic, occurs on all islands	NE^{IUCN}
Small painted locust		Schistocerca literosa	Endemic, occurs on Isabela, Santa Cruz San Cristóbal, Española, Marchena, Genovesa, and Baltra	NE^{IUCN}
		Sphingonotus fuscoirroratus	Endemic, occurs on Isabela, Santiago, Santa Cruz, San Cristóbal, Floreana, Fernandina, Española, Genovesa, Pinta, and Baltra	NE^{IUCN}
		Halmenus robustus	Endemic, occurs on Isabela, Santiago, Santa Cruz, Floreana, Genovesa, and North Seymour	NE^{IUCN}
		Nesoecia cooksonii	Endemic, occurs on Isabela, Santiago, Santa Cruz, Floreana, Española, and Genovesa	NE^{IUCN}
		Anaulacomera darwinii	Endemic, occurs on Isabela, Santiago, Santa Cruz, and San Cristóbal	NE^{IUCN}
		Copiphora brevicauda	Introduced, occurs on Isabela, Santa Cruz, and San Cristóbal	NE^{IUCN}
Broad-tipped conehead		Neoconocephalus triops	Occurs on Isabela, Santa Cruz, San Cristóbal, Floreana, Española, and Pinta	NE^{IUCN}
Tropical house cricket		Gryllodes sigillatus	Introduced, occurs on Isabela, Santa Cruz, San Cristóbal, Marchena, and Genovesa	NE^{IUCN}
		Jarmilaxipha ecuadorica	Introduced, occurs on Isabela, Santiago, Santa Cruz, San Cristóbal, Floreana, Fernandina, Española, Baltra, and North Seymour	NE^{IUCN}

=== Notable mantises (Mantodea) of the Galápagos ===
Common name	Picture	Scientific name	Distribution and habitat	IUCN status (Note: This column sorts by threat level, as outlined in the key above.)
Galápagos mantis		Galapagia solitaria	Endemic, occurs on Isabela, Santiago, Santa Cruz, San Cristóbal, Floreana, Española, Baltra, and North Seymour	NE^{IUCN}
Thorny-armed mantis		Stagmomantis theophila	Introduced, occurs on San Cristóbal	NE^{IUCN}
Mayan lichen mantis		Liturgusa maya	Introduced, occurs on Santa Cruz	NE^{IUCN}

== Other arthropods ==
=== Notable scorpions (Scorpiones) of the Galápagos ===
Common name	Picture	Scientific name	Distribution and habitat	IUCN status (Note: This column sorts by threat level, as outlined in the key above.)
		Hadruroides galapagoensis	Endemic, occurs on all islands except San Cristóbal	NE^{IUCN}

=== Notable crabs, hermit crabs, lobsters, etc. (Decapod) of the Galápagos ===
Common name	Picture	Scientific name	Distribution and habitat	IUCN status (Note: This column sorts by threat level, as outlined in the key above.)
Sally lightfoot crab		Grapsus grapsus	Occurs on all islands	NE^{IUCN}
Painted ghost crab		Ocypode gaudichaudii	Occurs on all islands	NE^{IUCN}
Galápagos fiddler crab		Minuca galapagensis	Endemic, occurs on all islands	NE^{IUCN}
Heller's fiddler crab		Leptuca helleri	Endemic, occurs on Isabela, Santa Cruz, San Cristóbal	NE^{IUCN}
		Calcinus explorator	Occurs on all islands	NE^{IUCN}
Ecuadorian hermit crab		Coenobita compressus	Occurs on all islands	NE^{IUCN}
Pronghorn spiny lobster		Panulirus penicillatus	Occurs on all islands	NE^{IUCN}
Tidepool shrimp		Palaemon ritteri	Occurs on all islands	NE^{IUCN}
