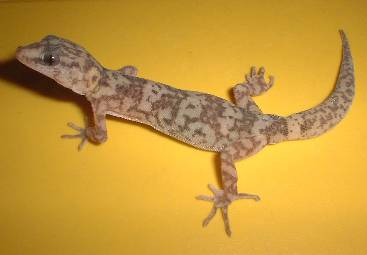

Conservation status
- Endangered (IUCN 3.1)

Scientific classification
- Kingdom: Animalia
- Phylum: Chordata
- Order: Squamata
- Suborder: Gekkota
- Family: Phyllodactylidae
- Genus: Phyllodactylus
- Species: P. angustidigitus

Binomial name
- Phyllodactylus angustidigitus Dixon and Huey, 1970

= Narrow leaf-toed gecko =

Species of lizard

The narrow leaf-toed gecko (Phyllodactylus angustidigitus) is a medium-sized gecko with a maximum snout-vent length of 57 mm.

This species is endemic from the Ica Region in southern Peru, and its known geographical distribution is restricted to the Paracas National Reservation, including two islands (La Vieja in the Bahia Independencia and Sangayan west of the Paracas Peninsula). This gecko most closely resembles Phyllodactylus gerrhopygus (a species that also occurs in southern Peru), from which it can be distinguished by smaller and more numerous terminal lamellae on the fourth toe.

Phyllodactylus angustidigitus inhabits sand dunes, rocky outcrops, and small hills throughout the desert in Paracas, though it is usually more abundant near shore. These geckos abound along shelly and gravel beaches, and seem to avoid sandy beaches. This gecko feeds on small invertebrates, including insects, crustaceans and spiders. Females appear to lay only one egg.

== References and external links ==
- Original description was done by Dixon, J.R. & R.B. Huey in 1970 in "Systematics of the lizards of the gekkonid genus Phyllodactylus of mainland South America". Contributions in science, Los Angeles County Museum of Natural History 192: 1-78.
- Lizards of the Paracas National Reserve
- Profile of the Paracas National Reserve by Parkswatch

Specific
