= Andes leaf-toed gecko =

Conservation status
- Least Concern (IUCN 3.1)

Scientific classification
- Kingdom: Animalia
- Phylum: Chordata
- Order: Squamata
- Suborder: Gekkota
- Family: Phyllodactylidae
- Genus: Phyllodactylus
- Species: P. interandinus

Binomial name
- Phyllodactylus interandinus Dixon & Huey, 1970

Species of lizard

The Andes leaf-toed gecko (Phyllodactylus interandinus) is a species of gecko. It is endemic to Peru.
