= Lima leaf-toed gecko =

Conservation status
- Critically Endangered (IUCN 3.1)

Scientific classification
- Kingdom: Animalia
- Phylum: Chordata
- Class: Reptilia
- Order: Squamata
- Suborder: Gekkota
- Family: Phyllodactylidae
- Genus: Phyllodactylus
- Species: P. sentosus

Binomial name
- Phyllodactylus sentosus Dixon and Huey, 1970

Species of lizard

The Lima leaf-toed gecko (Phyllodactylus sentosus) has been registered in six archeological sites in Lima, Peru, where it is endemic. It is considered a species in critical danger.
