= Phyllodactylus pumilus =

Conservation status
- Data Deficient (IUCN 3.1)

Scientific classification
- Kingdom: Animalia
- Phylum: Chordata
- Order: Squamata
- Suborder: Gekkota
- Family: Phyllodactylidae
- Genus: Phyllodactylus
- Species: P. pumilus

Binomial name
- Phyllodactylus pumilus Dixon and Huey, 1970

Species of lizard

Phyllodactylus pumilus is a species of gecko. It is endemic to Ecuador.
