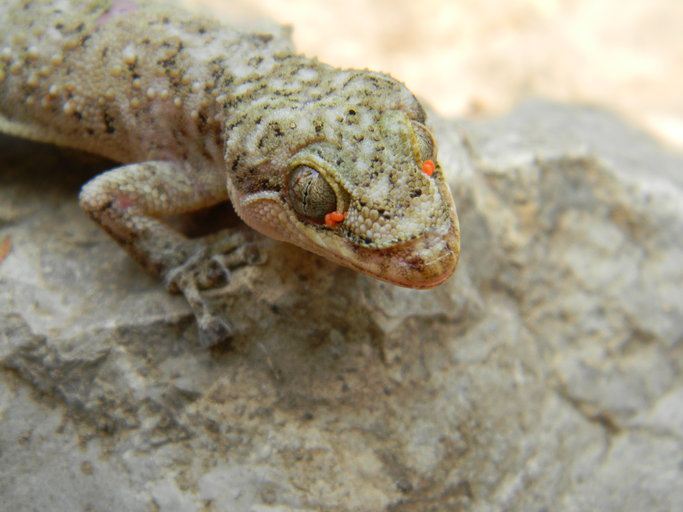

Conservation status
- Least Concern (IUCN 3.1)

Scientific classification
- Kingdom: Animalia
- Phylum: Chordata
- Class: Reptilia
- Order: Squamata
- Suborder: Gekkota
- Family: Phyllodactylidae
- Genus: Phyllodactylus
- Species: P. tuberculosus

Binomial name
- Phyllodactylus tuberculosus Wiegmann, 1834

= Yellowbelly gecko =

Species of lizard

The yellowbelly gecko (Phyllodactylus tuberculosus) is a species of gecko, a lizard in the family Phyllodactylidae. The species is native to Mexico and Central America. There are two recognized subspecies.

== Geographic range ==
P. tuberculosus is found in the southern Mexican states of Guerrero, Michoacán, Morelos, and Quintana Roo, and in the Central American countries of Belize, Costa Rica, El Salvador, Guatemala, Honduras, and Nicaragua.

== Habitat ==
The preferred natural habitat of P. tuberculosus is forest, at altitudes from sea level to 1,300 m (4,300 ft). It also is found in houses, where it hides during the day inside walls and in thatch roofs.

== Behavior ==
P. tuberculosus is terrestrial and predominately nocturnal.

== Diet ==
P. tuberculosus preys upon insects.

== Reproduction ==
P. tuberculosus is oviparous.

== Subspecies ==
Two subspecies are recognized as being valid, including the nominotypical subspecies.

- Phyllodactylus tuberculosus ingeri Dixon, 1964 – Dixon's tuberculate gecko
- Phyllodactylus tuberculosus tuberculosus Wiegmann, 1834 – geco panza amarilla

== Etymology ==
The subspecific name, ingeri, is in honor of American herpetologist Robert F. Inger.
