= Phyllodactylus nolascoensis =

Scientific classification
- Domain: Eukaryota
- Kingdom: Animalia
- Phylum: Chordata
- Class: Reptilia
- Order: Squamata
- Infraorder: Gekkota
- Family: Phyllodactylidae
- Genus: Phyllodactylus
- Species: P. nolascoensis

Binomial name
- Phyllodactylus nolascoensis Dixon, 1964

Species of lizard

The Nolasco leaf-toed gecko (Phyllodactylus nolascoensis) is a medium-sized gecko. It is found on San Pedro Nolasco Island in Mexico.
