= Phyllodactylus saxatilis =

Scientific classification
- Domain: Eukaryota
- Kingdom: Animalia
- Phylum: Chordata
- Class: Reptilia
- Order: Squamata
- Infraorder: Gekkota
- Family: Phyllodactylidae
- Genus: Phyllodactylus
- Species: P. saxatilis

Binomial name
- Phyllodactylus saxatilis Dixon, 1964

Species of lizard

Phyllodactylus saxatilis is a medium-sized gecko. It is found in Mexico.
