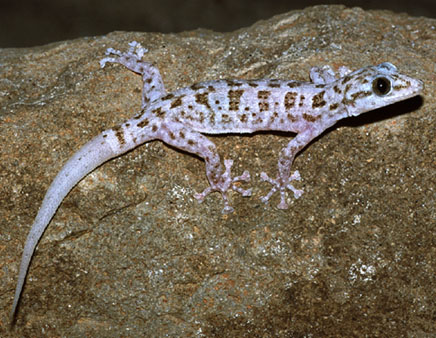
- Phyllodactylus xanti

Scientific classification
- Kingdom: Animalia
- Phylum: Chordata
- Class: Reptilia
- Order: Squamata
- Suborder: Gekkota
- Family: Phyllodactylidae
- Genus: Phyllodactylus; Gray, 1828

= Phyllodactylus =

Genus of lizards

Phyllodactylus is a genus of geckos distributed in South America and Central America, and as far north as the southern United States. They are commonly known as "leaf-toed geckos" in their native range, and otherwise as American leaf-toed geckos to distinguish them from unrelated genera with similar feet.

== Species ==
Phyllodactylus contains these species:

- Phyllodactylus andysabini Arteaga, Bustamante, Vieira, Tapia & Guayasamin, 2019 – Andy Sabin's leaf-toed gecko, Wolf Volcano leaf-toed gecko
- Phyllodactylus angustidigitus Dixon & Huey, 1970 – narrow leaf-toed gecko
- Phyllodactylus apricus Dixon, 1966 – Las Animas Island gecko
- Phyllodactylus barringtonensis Van Denburgh, 1912 – Barrington leaf-toed gecko
- Phyllodactylus baurii Garman, 1892 – Baur's leaf-toed gecko
- Phyllodactylus benedettii Ramírez-Reyes & Flores-Villela, 2018
- Phyllodactylus bordai Taylor, 1942 – Guerreran leaf-toed gecko
- Phyllodactylus bugastrolepis Dixon, 1966 – Catalina Island leaf-toed gecko
- Phyllodactylus cleofasensis Ramírez-Reyes, Barraza-Soltero, Nolasco-Luna, Flores-Villela & Escobedo-Galván, 2021
- Phyllodactylus clinatus Dixon & Huey, 1970 – Cerro Illescas gecko
- Phyllodactylus coronatus Dixon, 1966 – Coronado Island leaf-toed gecko
- Phyllodactylus darwini Taylor, 1942 – Darwin's leaf-toed gecko
- Phyllodactylus davisi Dixon, 1964 – Davis's leaf-toed gecko
- Phyllodactylus delcampoi Mosauer, 1936 – Del Campo's leaf-toed gecko
- Phyllodactylus delsolari Venegas, Townsend, Koch & Böhme, 2008
- Phyllodactylus dixoni Rivero-Blanco & Lancini, 1968 – Dixon's leaf-toed gecko
- Phyllodactylus duellmani Dixon, 1960 – Duellman's pigmy leaf-toed gecko
- Phyllodactylus duncanensis Van Denburgh, 1912
- Phyllodactylus galapagensis W. Peters, 1869 – Galapagos leaf-toed gecko
- Phyllodactylus gerrhopygus (Wiegmann, 1834) – South American leaf-toed gecko
- Phyllodactylus gilberti Heller, 1903 – Gilbert's leaf-toed gecko
- Phyllodactylus gorii Lanza, 1973 - Española leaf-toed gecko
- Phyllodactylus hispaniolae Schwartz, 1979 – Dominican leaf-toed gecko
- Phyllodactylus homolepidurus H.M. Smith, 1935 – Sonoran leaf-toed gecko
- Phyllodactylus inaequalis Cope, 1876 – Peru leaf-toed gecko
- Phyllodactylus insularis Dixon, 1960 – Belize leaf-toed gecko
- Phyllodactylus interandinus Dixon & Huey, 1970 – Andes leaf-toed gecko
- Phyllodactylus johnwrighti Dixon & Huey, 1970 – Rio Huancabamba leaf-toed gecko
- Phyllodactylus julieni Cope, 1885 – Aruba leaf-toed gecko
- Phyllodactylus kofordi Dixon & Huey, 1970 – coastal leaf-toed gecko
- Phyllodactylus kropotkini Ramírez-Reyes & Flores-Villela, 2018
- Phyllodactylus lanei H.M. Smith, 1935 – Lane's leaf-toed gecko
- Phyllodactylus leei Cope, 1889 – San Cristóbal Island leaf-toed gecko, Chatham leaf-toed gecko
- Phyllodactylus leoni Torres-Carvajal, Carvajal-Campos, Barnes, Nicholls & Pozo-Andrade, 2013
- Phyllodactylus lepidopygus (Tschudi, 1845) – western leaf-toed gecko
- Phyllodactylus magister Noble, 1924 – Noble's leaf-toed gecko
- Phyllodactylus magnus Taylor, 1942
- Phyllodactylus maresi Lanza, 1973 – Mares's leaf-toed gecko
- Phyllodactylus martini Lidth de Jeude, 1887 – Dutch leaf-toed gecko
- Phyllodactylus microphyllus Cope, 1876 – central leaf-toed gecko
- Phyllodactylus muralis Taylor, 1940 – Oaxacan leaf-toed gecko
- Phyllodactylus nocticolus Dixon, 1964 – peninsula leaf-toed gecko
- Phyllodactylus nolascoensis Dixon, 1964 – Nolasco leaf-toed gecko
- Phyllodactylus pachamama Koch, Flecks, Venegas, Bialke, Valverde & Rödder, 2016
- Phyllodactylus palmeus Dixon, 1968 – Honduras leaf-toed gecko
- Phyllodactylus papenfussi Murphy, Blair & Méndez-de la Cruz, 2009
- Phyllodactylus paralepis McCranie & Hedges, 2013
- Phyllodactylus partidus Dixon, 1966 – Pardita Norte leaf-toed gecko
- Phyllodactylus paucituberculatus Dixon, 1960 – Rio Marquez Valley gecko
- Phyllodactylus pulcher Gray, 1830 – Barbados leaf-toed gecko
- Phyllodactylus pumilus Dixon & Huey, 1970
- Phyllodactylus reissii W. Peters, 1862 – Peters's leaf-toed gecko
- Phyllodactylus rutteni Hummelinck, 1940 – Venezuela leaf-toed gecko
- Phyllodactylus santacruzensis Dixon, 1966 – Santa Cruz leaf-toed gecko
- Phyllodactylus saxatilis Dixon, 1964
- Phyllodactylus sentosus Dixon & Huey, 1970 – Lima leaf-toed gecko
- Phyllodactylus simpsoni Arteaga, Bustamante, Vieira, Tapia & Guayasamin, 2019 – Simpson's leaf-toed gecko, Western Galápagos leaf-toed gecko
- Phyllodactylus sommeri Schwartz, 1979 – Haiti leaf-toed gecko
- Phyllodactylus thompsoni Venegas, Townsend, Koch & Böhme, 2008
- Phyllodactylus transversalis Huey, 1975 – Colombian leaf-toed gecko
- Phyllodactylus tuberculosus Wiegmann, 1834 – yellowbelly gecko
- Phyllodactylus unctus (Cope, 1864) – San Lucan gecko
- Phyllodactylus ventralis O'Shaughnessy, 1875
- Phyllodactylus wirshingi Kerster & H.M. Smith, 1955 – Puerto Rican leaf-toed gecko
- Phyllodactylus xanti Cope, 1863 – leaf-toed gecko, peninsular leaf-toed gecko

Nota bene: A binomial authority in parentheses indicates that the species was originally described in a genus other than Phyllodactylus.
