= Phyllodactylus coronatus =

Scientific classification
- Kingdom: Animalia
- Phylum: Chordata
- Order: Squamata
- Suborder: Gekkota
- Family: Phyllodactylidae
- Genus: Phyllodactylus
- Species: P. coronatus

Binomial name
- Phyllodactylus coronatus Dixon, 1966

Species of lizard

The Coronado Island leaf-toed gecko (Phyllodactylus coronatus) is a species of gecko. It is endemic to the Coronado Islands in Mexico.
