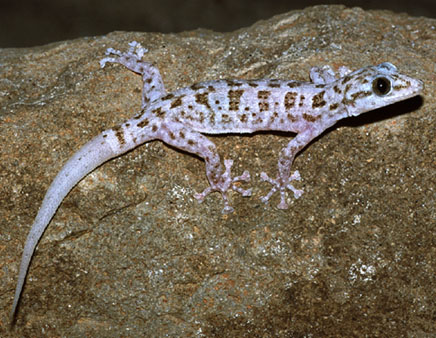

Conservation status
- Least Concern (IUCN 3.1)

Scientific classification
- Kingdom: Animalia
- Phylum: Chordata
- Class: Reptilia
- Order: Squamata
- Suborder: Gekkota
- Family: Phyllodactylidae
- Genus: Phyllodactylus
- Species: P. xanti

Binomial name
- Phyllodactylus xanti Cope, 1863

= Phyllodactylus xanti =

Species of lizard

Phyllodactylus xanti is a species of lizard in the family Phyllodactylidae. It is endemic to northwestern Mexico. It is also known as the leaf-toed gecko (among many other species) or Raza Island leaf-toed gecko when referring to the subspecies from the Isla Rasa; at present, there are altogether four recognized subspecies, while several more have been recognized previously.

== Geographic range ==
P. xanti is found in the Baja California Peninsula and associated islands in Mexico. Records from southern California (USA) refer to Phyllodactylus nocticolus, first described as Phyllodactylus xanti nocticolus, now considered a distinct species.

== Habitat ==
The preferred natural habitats of P. xanti are desert and shrubland.

== Description ==
P. xanti has vertical pupils, immovable eyelids, and leaf-like toe pads. It has a brownish, grey, or pinkish dorsum, with a light venter. The granular dorsal scales are interspersed with tubercles.

It often squeaks when handled, and it has a very fragile tail which is readily lost.

This gecko is between 2.5 and 6.2 cm (0.98 and 2.44 in) in snout-to-vent length (SVL).

== Reproduction ==
P. xanti is oviparous.

== Subspecies ==
Four subspecies are recognized as being valid, including the nominotypical subspecies.

- Phyllodactylus xanti acorius Dixon, 1966
- Phyllodactylus xanti sloani Bostic, 1971
- Phyllodactylus xanti xanti Cope, 1863
- Phyllodactylus xanti zweifeli Dixon, 1964

== Etymology ==
The specific epithet, xanti, commemorate John Xantus, a nineteenth century naturalist active in the United States of America.

The subspecific names, sloani and zweifeli, are in honor of American herpetologists Allan John Sloan and Richard G. Zweifel, respectively.

== Taxonomy ==
The accepted scientific name and original description were published in 1863 by Edward Drinker Cope.
