= Rio Huancabamba leaf-toed gecko =

Conservation status
- Endangered (IUCN 3.1)

Scientific classification
- Kingdom: Animalia
- Phylum: Chordata
- Order: Squamata
- Suborder: Gekkota
- Family: Phyllodactylidae
- Genus: Phyllodactylus
- Species: P. johnwrighti

Binomial name
- Phyllodactylus johnwrighti Dixon & Huey, 1970

Species of lizard

The Rio Huancabamba leaf-toed gecko (Phyllodactylus johnwrighti) is a species of lizard in the family Phyllodactylidae. The species is endemic to Peru.

== Etymology ==
The specific name, johnwrighti, is in honor of American herpetologist John William Wright (born 1936).

== Geographic range ==
P. johnwrighti is found on the slopes of the Huancabamba River valley in Cajamarca Region, Peru.

== Habitat ==
The preferred natural habitat of P. johnwrighti is shrubland, at an altitude of 2,100 m (6,900 ft).

== Reproduction ==
P. johnwrighti is oviparous.
