= Cerro Illescas gecko =

Conservation status
- Data Deficient (IUCN 3.1)

Scientific classification
- Kingdom: Animalia
- Phylum: Chordata
- Order: Squamata
- Suborder: Gekkota
- Family: Phyllodactylidae
- Genus: Phyllodactylus
- Species: P. clinatus

Binomial name
- Phyllodactylus clinatus Dixon & Huey, 1970

Species of lizard

The Cerro Illescas gecko (Phyllodactylus clinatus) is a species of gecko. It is endemic to Peru.
