= Dixon's leaf-toed gecko =

Conservation status
- Least Concern (IUCN 3.1)

Scientific classification
- Kingdom: Animalia
- Phylum: Chordata
- Class: Reptilia
- Order: Squamata
- Suborder: Gekkota
- Family: Phyllodactylidae
- Genus: Phyllodactylus
- Species: P. dixoni

Binomial name
- Phyllodactylus dixoni Rivero-Blanco & Lancini, 1968

Species of lizard

Dixon's leaf-toed gecko (Phyllodactylus dixoni) is a species of lizard in the family Phyllodactylidae. The species is endemic to Venezuela.

== Etymology ==
The specific name, dixoni, is in honor of American herpetologist James R. Dixon.

== Habitat ==
The preferred natural habitat of Phyllodactylus dixoni is rocky areas, at an altitude of 40 m (130 ft).

== Reproduction ==
Phyllodactylus dixoni is oviparous.
