= Noble's leaf-toed gecko =

Scientific classification
- Kingdom: Animalia
- Phylum: Chordata
- Class: Reptilia
- Order: Squamata
- Suborder: Gekkota
- Family: Phyllodactylidae
- Genus: Phyllodactylus
- Species: P. magister

Binomial name
- Phyllodactylus magister Noble, 1924

Species of lizard

Noble's leaf-toed gecko (Phyllodactylus magister) is a species of gecko. It is endemic to Peru.
