= Phyllodactylus papenfussi =

Scientific classification
- Kingdom: Animalia
- Phylum: Chordata
- Class: Reptilia
- Order: Squamata
- Suborder: Gekkota
- Family: Phyllodactylidae
- Genus: Phyllodactylus
- Species: P. papenfussi

Binomial name
- Phyllodactylus papenfussi R. Murphy, Blair & de la Cruz, 2009

Species of lizard

Phyllodactylus papenfussi is a species of gecko, a lizard in the family Phyllodactylidae. The species is endemic to Mexico.

== Etymology ==
The specific name, papenfussi, is in honor of American herpetologist Theodore Johnstone Papenfuss (born 1941).

== Geographic range ==
Phyllodactylus papenfussi is found in the Mexican state of Guerrero.

== Reproduction ==
Phyllodactylus papenfussi is oviparous.
