= Phyllodactylus magnus =

Scientific classification
- Domain: Eukaryota
- Kingdom: Animalia
- Phylum: Chordata
- Class: Reptilia
- Order: Squamata
- Infraorder: Gekkota
- Family: Phyllodactylidae
- Genus: Phyllodactylus
- Species: P. magnus

Binomial name
- Phyllodactylus magnus Taylor, 1942

Species of lizard

Phyllodactylus magnus is a species of gecko. It is native to Mexico and Guatemala.
