= Phyllodactylus benedettii =

Scientific classification
- Kingdom: Animalia
- Phylum: Chordata
- Class: Reptilia
- Order: Squamata
- Suborder: Gekkota
- Family: Phyllodactylidae
- Genus: Phyllodactylus
- Species: P. benedettii

Binomial name
- Phyllodactylus benedettii Ramirez-Reyes & Flores-Villela, 2018

Species of lizard

Phyllodactylus benedettii is a species of gecko. It is endemic to Jalisco, Mexico.

It is a nocturnal species often found in rocks and crevices within the tropical dry forest, but can also occupy human settlements near undisturbed areas.
