= Haiti leaf-toed gecko =

Conservation status
- Critically Endangered (IUCN 3.1)

Scientific classification
- Kingdom: Animalia
- Phylum: Chordata
- Class: Reptilia
- Order: Squamata
- Suborder: Gekkota
- Family: Phyllodactylidae
- Genus: Phyllodactylus
- Species: P. sommeri

Binomial name
- Phyllodactylus sommeri Schwartz, 1979

Species of lizard

The Haiti leaf-toed gecko (Phyllodactylus sommeri) is a species of gecko. It is endemic to Haiti, on the island of Hispaniola.
