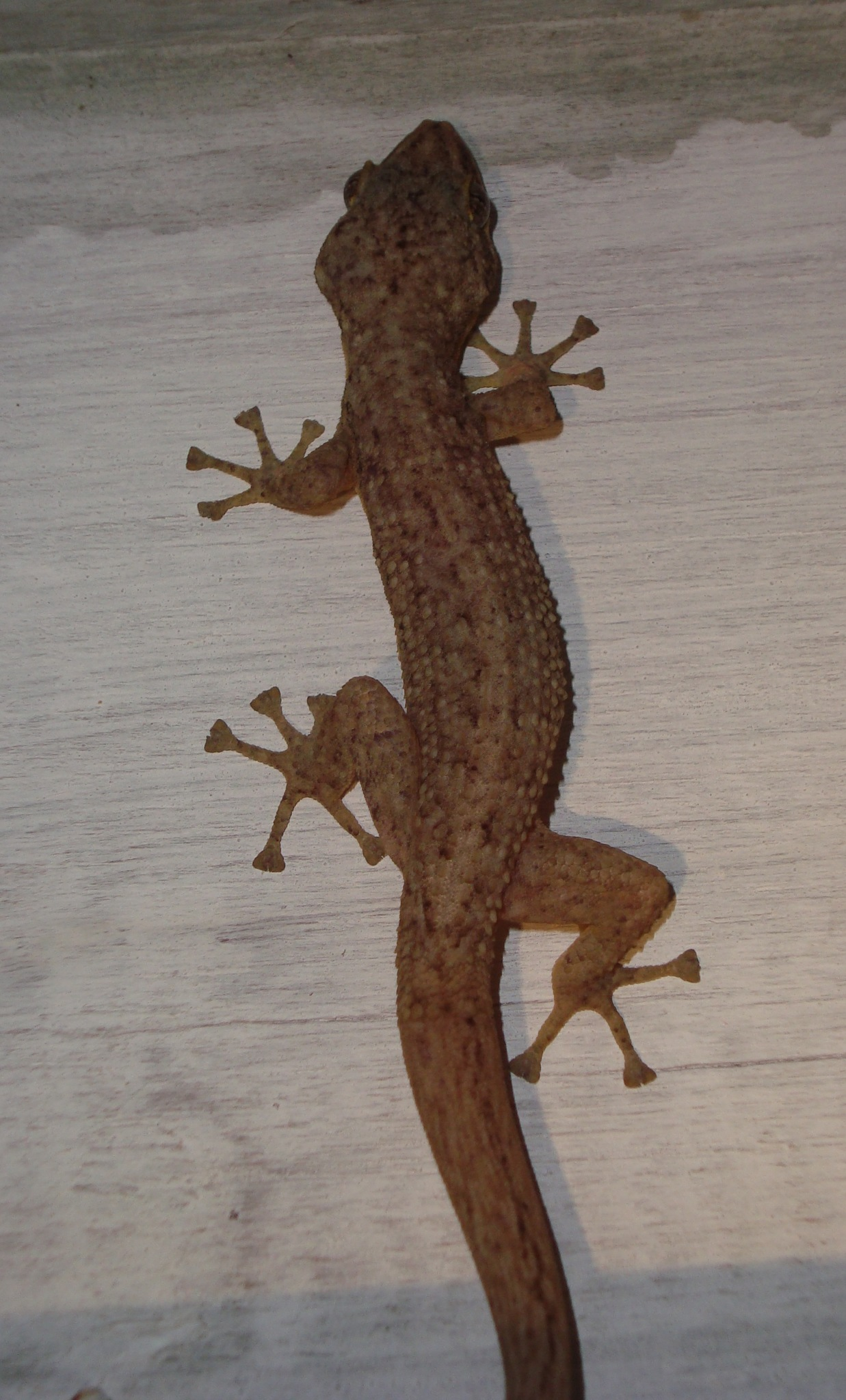

Scientific classification
- Kingdom: Animalia
- Phylum: Chordata
- Order: Squamata
- Suborder: Gekkota
- Family: Phyllodactylidae
- Genus: Phyllodactylus
- Species: P. palmeus

Binomial name
- Phyllodactylus palmeus Dixon, 1968

= Honduras leaf-toed gecko =

Species of lizard

The Honduras leaf-toed gecko (Phyllodactylus palmeus) is a species of gecko. It is endemic to the Bay Islands in Honduras.
