= Peru leaf-toed gecko =

Conservation status
- Least Concern (IUCN 3.1)

Scientific classification
- Kingdom: Animalia
- Phylum: Chordata
- Class: Reptilia
- Order: Squamata
- Suborder: Gekkota
- Family: Phyllodactylidae
- Genus: Phyllodactylus
- Species: P. inaequalis

Binomial name
- Phyllodactylus inaequalis Cope, 1876

Species of lizard

The Peru leaf-toed gecko (Phyllodactylus inaequalis) is a species of gecko. It is endemic to Peru.
