= Phyllodactylus leoni =

Conservation status
- Vulnerable (IUCN 3.1)

Scientific classification
- Kingdom: Animalia
- Phylum: Chordata
- Class: Reptilia
- Order: Squamata
- Suborder: Gekkota
- Family: Phyllodactylidae
- Genus: Phyllodactylus
- Species: P. leoni

Binomial name
- Phyllodactylus leoni Torres-Carvajal, Carvajal-Campos Barnes, Nicholls, & Pozo-Andrade, 2013

Species of lizard

Phyllodactylus leoni is a species of gecko. It is endemic to Ecuador.
