= Phyllodactylus apricus =

Scientific classification
- Kingdom: Animalia
- Phylum: Chordata
- Order: Squamata
- Suborder: Gekkota
- Family: Phyllodactylidae
- Genus: Phyllodactylus
- Species: P. apricus

Binomial name
- Phyllodactylus apricus Dixon, 1966

Species of lizard

The Las Animas Island gecko (Phyllodactylus apricus) is a species of gecko. It is endemic to Isla Las Ánimas in Mexico.
