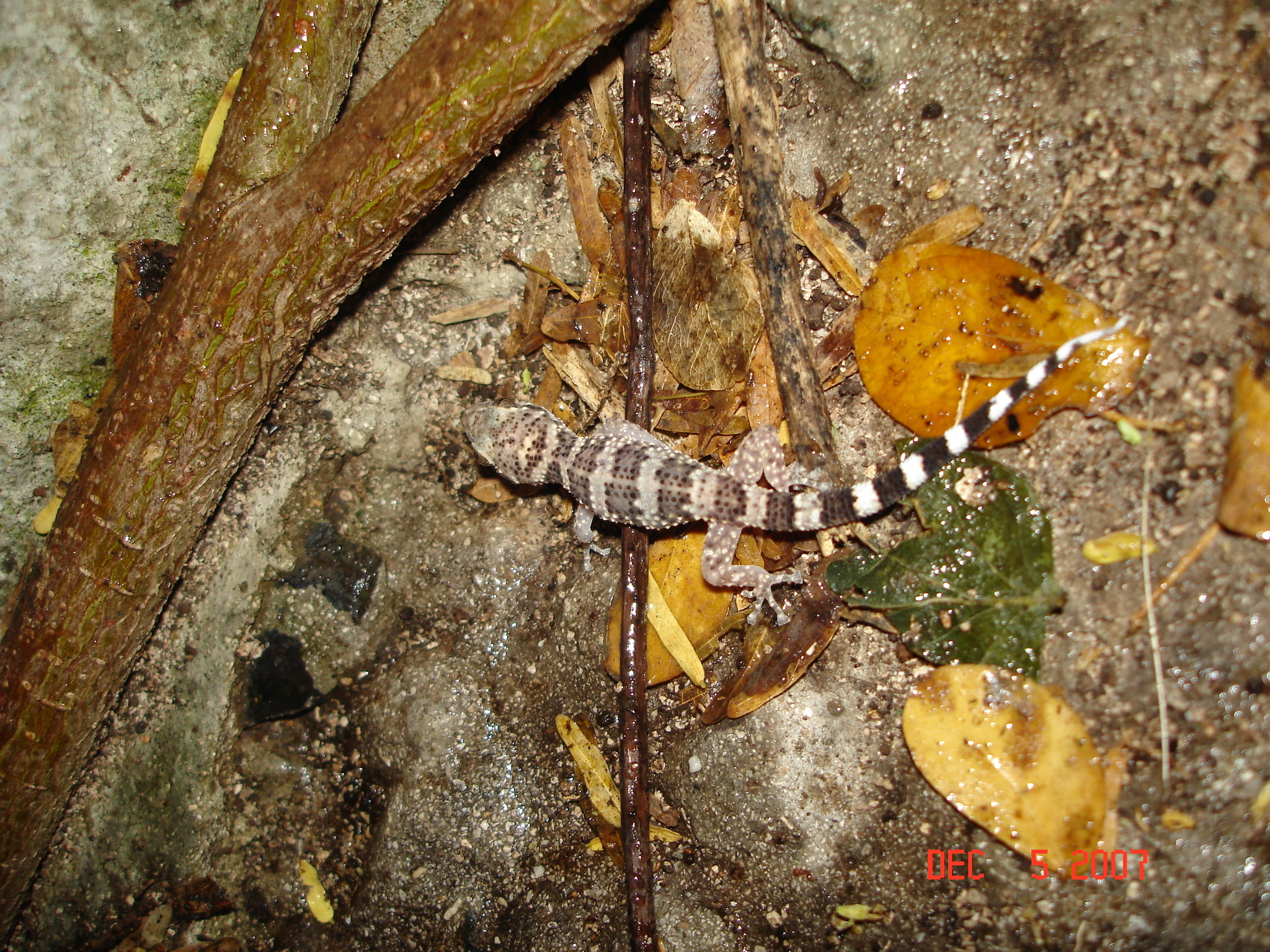

Conservation status
- Near Threatened (IUCN 3.1)

Scientific classification
- Kingdom: Animalia
- Phylum: Chordata
- Class: Reptilia
- Order: Squamata
- Suborder: Gekkota
- Family: Phyllodactylidae
- Genus: Phyllodactylus
- Species: P. wirshingi

Binomial name
- Phyllodactylus wirshingi Kerster & H.M. Smith, 1955

= Puerto Rican leaf-toed gecko =

Species of reptile

The Puerto Rican leaf-toed gecko (Phyllodactylus wirshingi) is a species of lizard in the family Phyllodactylidae. The species is endemic to Puerto Rico.

== Etymology ==
The specific name, wirshingi, is in honor of Puerto Rican amateur naturalist Juan A. "Tito" Wirshing (died 1967), who collected the holotype.

== Geographic range ==
P. wirshingi is found on the Puerto Rican island of Caja de Muertos, and on the adjacent southern coast of Puerto Rico.

== Habitat ==
The preferred natural habitat of P. wirshingi is forest at altitudes from sea level to 150 m (490 ft).

== Reproduction ==
P. wirshingi is oviparous.
