= Phyllodactylus santacruzensis =

Scientific classification
- Kingdom: Animalia
- Phylum: Chordata
- Order: Squamata
- Suborder: Gekkota
- Family: Phyllodactylidae
- Genus: Phyllodactylus
- Species: P. santacruzensis

Binomial name
- Phyllodactylus santacruzensis Dixon, 1966

Species of lizard

The Santa Cruz leaf-toed gecko (Phyllodactylus santacruzensis) is a species of gecko. It is endemic to Isla Santa Cruz in Mexico.
