= Phyllodactylus kropotkini =

Scientific classification
- Domain: Eukaryota
- Kingdom: Animalia
- Phylum: Chordata
- Class: Reptilia
- Order: Squamata
- Infraorder: Gekkota
- Family: Phyllodactylidae
- Genus: Phyllodactylus
- Species: P. kropotkini

Binomial name
- Phyllodactylus kropotkini Ramirez-Reyes & Flores-Villela, 2018

Species of lizard

Phyllodactylus kropotkini is a species of gecko. It is endemic to Mexico.
