= Phyllodactylus delsolari =

Conservation status
- Endangered (IUCN 3.1)

Scientific classification
- Kingdom: Animalia
- Phylum: Chordata
- Class: Reptilia
- Order: Squamata
- Suborder: Gekkota
- Family: Phyllodactylidae
- Genus: Phyllodactylus
- Species: P. delsolari

Binomial name
- Phyllodactylus delsolari Venegas, Townsend, Koch & Böhme, 2008

Species of lizard

Phyllodactylus delsolari is a species of gecko, a lizard in the family Phyllodactylidae. The species is endemic to Peru.

== Etymology ==
The specific name, delsolari, is in honor of Peruvian ornithologist Gustavo del Solar (1937–2008).

== Geographic range ==
P. delsolari is found in the Peruvian Departments of Amazonas, Cajamarca, and La Libertad.

== Habitat ==
The preferred natural habitat of P. delsolari is forest, at altitudes of 890–1,870 m (2,920–6,140 ft).

== Description ==
Large for its genus, P. delsolari has a snout-to-vent length (SVL) greater than 7 cm (2.8 in).

== Reproduction ==
P. delsolari is oviparous.
