= Duellman's pigmy leaf-toed gecko =

Conservation status
- Least Concern (IUCN 3.1)

Scientific classification
- Kingdom: Animalia
- Phylum: Chordata
- Order: Squamata
- Suborder: Gekkota
- Family: Phyllodactylidae
- Genus: Phyllodactylus
- Species: P. duellmani

Binomial name
- Phyllodactylus duellmani Dixon, 1960

Species of lizard

Duellman's pigmy leaf-toed gecko (Phyllodactylus duellmani), also known commonly as la salamanquesa pigmea de Duellman in Mexican Spanish, is a species of lizard in the family Phyllodactylidae. The species is endemic to Mexico.

== Etymology ==
The specific name, duellmani, is in honor of American herpetologist William Edward Duellman.

== Geographic range ==
P. duellmani is found in the Mexican state of Michoacán.

== Habitat ==
The preferred natural habitat of P. duellmani is forest, where it has been found on tree branches and on rocks.

== Reproduction ==
P. duellmani is oviparous.
