= Rio Marquez Valley gecko =

Conservation status
- Data Deficient (IUCN 3.1)

Scientific classification
- Kingdom: Animalia
- Phylum: Chordata
- Order: Squamata
- Suborder: Gekkota
- Family: Phyllodactylidae
- Genus: Phyllodactylus
- Species: P. paucituberculatus

Binomial name
- Phyllodactylus paucituberculatus Dixon, 1960

Species of lizard

The Rio Marquez Valley gecko (Phyllodactylus paucituberculatus) is a species of gecko. It is endemic to Mexico.
