= Oaxacan leaf-toed gecko =

Conservation status
- Least Concern (IUCN 3.1)

Scientific classification
- Kingdom: Animalia
- Phylum: Chordata
- Class: Reptilia
- Order: Squamata
- Suborder: Gekkota
- Family: Phyllodactylidae
- Genus: Phyllodactylus
- Species: P. muralis

Binomial name
- Phyllodactylus muralis Taylor, 1940

Species of lizard

The Oaxacan leaf-toed gecko (Phyllodactylus muralis) is a species of gecko. It is endemic to Mexico.
