= Venezuela leaf-toed gecko =

Conservation status
- Near Threatened (IUCN 3.1)

Scientific classification
- Kingdom: Animalia
- Phylum: Chordata
- Class: Reptilia
- Order: Squamata
- Suborder: Gekkota
- Family: Phyllodactylidae
- Genus: Phyllodactylus
- Species: P. rutteni

Binomial name
- Phyllodactylus rutteni Hummelinck, 1940

Species of lizard

The Venezuela leaf-toed gecko (Phyllodactylus rutteni), also known commonly as the Venezuelan leaf-toed gecko, is a species of lizard in the family Phyllodactylidae. The species is endemic to islands off the coast of Venezuela.

== Etymology ==
The specific name, rutteni, is in honor of Dutch geologist Louis Rutten.

== Geographic range ==
P. rutteni is found on the following Venezuelan islands: Blanquilla, Los Hermanos, La Orchila, Los Roques, and La Tortuga.

== Habitat ==
The preferred natural habitat of P. rutteni is shrubland, at altitudes of 0–100 m (0–328 ft).

== Reproduction ==
P. rutteni is oviparous.
