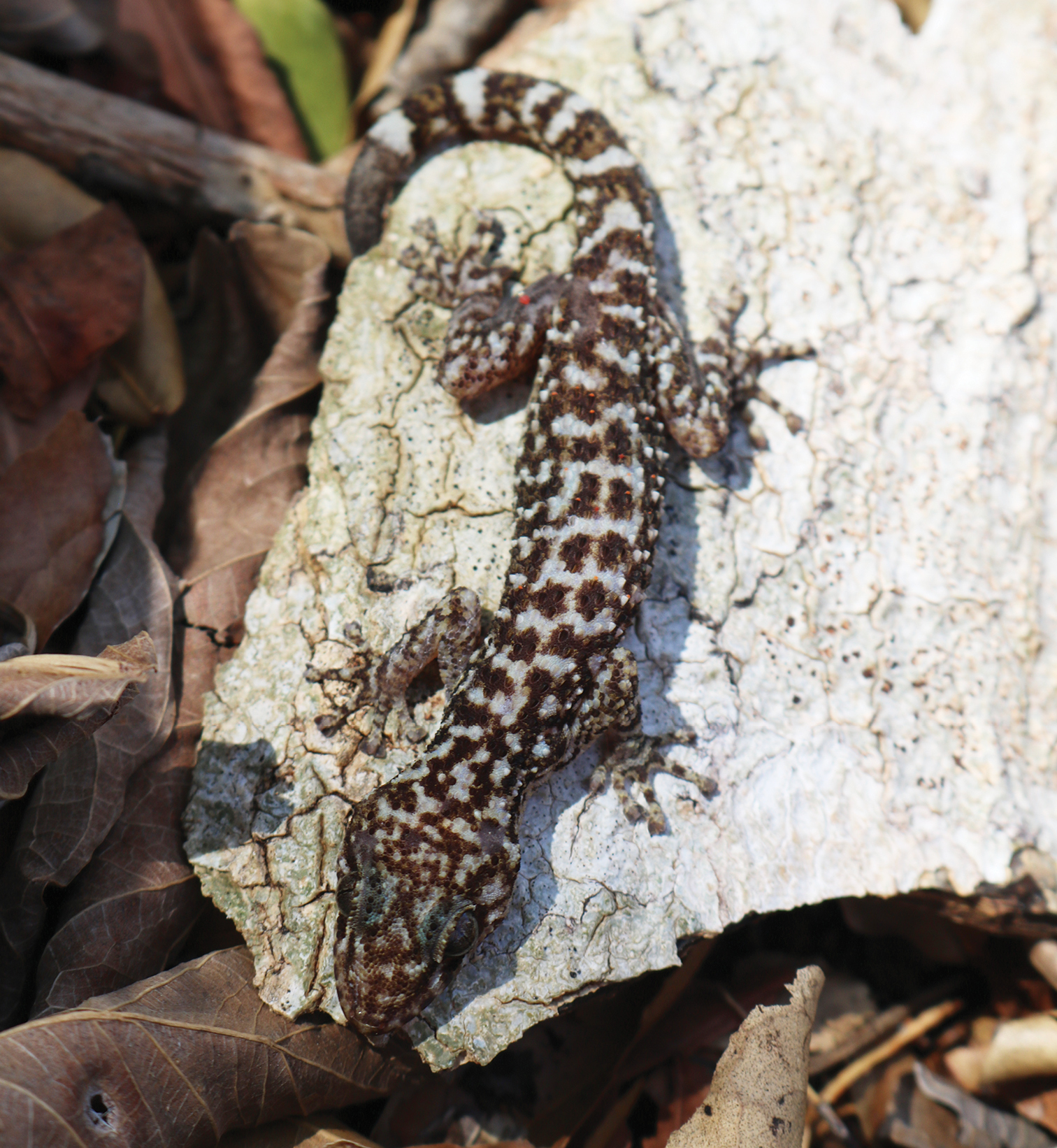
- Phyllodactylus cleofasensis

Scientific classification
- Kingdom: Animalia
- Phylum: Chordata
- Class: Reptilia
- Order: Squamata
- Suborder: Gekkota
- Family: Phyllodactylidae
- Genus: Phyllodactylus
- Species: P. cleofasensis

Binomial name
- Phyllodactylus cleofasensis Ramírez-Reyes, Barraza-Soltero, Nolasco-Luna, Flores-Villela, & Escobedo-Galván, 2021

= Phyllodactylus cleofasensis =

Species of lizard

Phyllodactylus cleofasensis is a species of gecko. It is endemic to the island of María Cleofas in the Islas Marías, in the Mexican state of Nayarit. It is a medium to large species of gecko, with the snout–vent lengths of measured individuals ranging from 44.8 to 77.0 mm, with a mean snout–vent length of 59.5 mm

== Taxonomy ==
Phyllodactylus cleofasensis was formally described in 2021 based on an adult female specimen collected from María Cleofas Island in Nayarit, Mexico. The species is named after the island on which it was discovered, with the Latin suffix-ensis meaning "originating from". The species has the English common name María Cleofas leaf-toed gecko and the Spanish common name Salamanquesa de la Isla María Cleofas.

== Description ==
Phyllodactylus cleofasensis is a medium to large species of gecko, with the snout–vent lengths of measured individuals ranging from 44.8 to 77.0 mm, with a mean snout–vent length of 59.5 mm. It has a white venter, variable dorsal coloration, and a large number of paravertebral dorsal tubercles. P. cleofasensis can be differentiated from the rest of the P. saxatilis clade by the average 47.89 paravertebral dorsal tubercles from the head to the tail; the average 26.5 scales across the snout, starting from the third labial scale; and mean 61 longitudinal ventral scales from an imaginary line of the forelimbs to the cloacal opening.

== Distribution and ecology ==
Phyllodactylus cleofasensis is endemic to the island of María Cleofas in the Islas Marías in the Mexican state of Nayarit. Individuals of the species were observed at night surveys under single rocks, abandoned man-made structures, or on the trunks of Piranhea mexicana. Some were observed on the ground while they moved between rocks.

Phyllodactylus cleofasensis feeds on a variety of arthropods and plant matter. It is known to eat rhaphidophorid orthopterans, passalid beetles, arachnids, the scorpion Centruroides elegans, and the cockroach Pycnoselus surinamensis. It is also known to feed on its own shed skin. There are no confirmed predators of the gecko, but Oxybelis microphthalmus snakes have been observed near the geckos and represent a possible predator.
