= Dominican leaf-toed gecko =

Conservation status
- Endangered (IUCN 3.1)

Scientific classification
- Kingdom: Animalia
- Phylum: Chordata
- Class: Reptilia
- Order: Squamata
- Suborder: Gekkota
- Family: Phyllodactylidae
- Genus: Phyllodactylus
- Species: P. hispaniolae

Binomial name
- Phyllodactylus hispaniolae Schwartz, 1979

Species of lizard

The Dominican leaf-toed gecko (Phyllodactylus hispaniolae) is a species of gecko. It is endemic to the Dominican Republic, on the island of Hispaniola.
