= Sonoran leaf-toed gecko =

Conservation status
- Least Concern (IUCN 3.1)

Scientific classification
- Kingdom: Animalia
- Phylum: Chordata
- Class: Reptilia
- Order: Squamata
- Suborder: Gekkota
- Family: Phyllodactylidae
- Genus: Phyllodactylus
- Species: P. homolepidurus

Binomial name
- Phyllodactylus homolepidurus Smith, 1935

Species of lizard

The Sonoran leaf-toed gecko (Phyllodactylus homolepidurus) is a species of gecko. It is endemic to Mexico.
