= Davis's leaf-toed gecko =

Conservation status
- Least Concern (IUCN 3.1)

Scientific classification
- Kingdom: Animalia
- Phylum: Chordata
- Order: Squamata
- Suborder: Gekkota
- Family: Phyllodactylidae
- Genus: Phyllodactylus
- Species: P. davisi

Binomial name
- Phyllodactylus davisi Dixon, 1964

Species of lizard

Davis's leaf-toed gecko (Phyllodactylus davisi), also known commonly as Davis' leaf-toed gecko, is a species of lizard in the family Phyllodactylidae. The species is endemic to Mexico.

== Etymology ==
The specific name, davisi, is in honor of American zoologist William Bennoni Davis.

== Geographic range ==
P. davisi is found in western Mexico, in the Mexican states of Colima and Michoacán.

== Habitat ==
The preferred natural habitat of P. davisi is rocky areas within forest.

== Behavior ==
P. davisi is terrestrial and saxicolous (rock-dwelling).

== Reproduction ==
P. davisi is oviparous.
