= Phyllodactylus paralepis =

Scientific classification
- Kingdom: Animalia
- Phylum: Chordata
- Class: Reptilia
- Order: Squamata
- Suborder: Gekkota
- Family: Phyllodactylidae
- Genus: Phyllodactylus
- Species: P. paralepis

Binomial name
- Phyllodactylus paralepis McCranie & Hedges, 2013

Species of lizard

Phyllodactylus paralepis is a species of gecko. It is endemic to Honduras.
