= Western leaf-toed gecko =

Conservation status
- Vulnerable (IUCN 3.1)

Scientific classification
- Kingdom: Animalia
- Phylum: Chordata
- Class: Reptilia
- Order: Squamata
- Suborder: Gekkota
- Family: Phyllodactylidae
- Genus: Phyllodactylus
- Species: P. lepidopygus

Binomial name
- Phyllodactylus lepidopygus (Tschudi, 1845)

Synonyms
- Diplodactylus lepidopygus Tschudi, 1845; Discodactylus phacophorus Tschudi, 1845; Phyllodactylus nigrofasciatus Cope, 1878; Phyllodactylus phacophorus (Tschudi, 1845); Phyllodactylus variegatus Werner, 1901

Species of lizard

The western leaf-toed gecko (Phyllodactylus lepidopygus) is a species of gecko. It is endemic to Peru. It was described by Johann Jakob von Tschudi in 1845.

The species' natural habitat is restricted to the central coast of Peru, between the regions of Ica and Ancash. In the Lima region, a large portion of its coastal habitat has been negatively affected by urban development. Within the city of Lima, sightings were reported in 2004 in the Pantanos de Villa Reserved Zone, where the species may have found a good opportunity to survive. Large populations of this species are found in the lomas (fog-supported vegetation communities) of Pachacamac and Lachay.

== References and external links ==
- Original description was done by Tschudi, J. J. von in 1845 in "Untersuchungen über die Fauna Peruana. Herpetologie". Scheitlin & Zollikofer, St. Gallen, p. 38.
- Systematic account, natural history and distribution of this gecko are found in Dixon, J.R. & R.B. Huey in 1970 in "Systematics of the lizards of the gekkonid genus Phyllodactylus of mainland South America". Contributions in Science, Los Angeles County Museum of Natural History 192: 1-78.
