= Del Campo's leaf-toed gecko =

Conservation status
- Least Concern (IUCN 3.1)

Scientific classification
- Kingdom: Animalia
- Phylum: Chordata
- Class: Reptilia
- Order: Squamata
- Suborder: Gekkota
- Family: Phyllodactylidae
- Genus: Phyllodactylus
- Species: P. delcampoi

Binomial name
- Phyllodactylus delcampoi Mosauer, 1936

Synonyms
- Phyllodactylus delcampoi Mosauer, 1936; Phyllodactylus delcampi — H.M. Smith & Taylor, 1950; Phyllodactylus delcampoi — Liner, 1994

Species of lizard

Del Campo's leaf-toed gecko (Phyllodactylus delcampoi), also known commonly as la salamanquesa de del Campo in Spanish, is a species of lizard in the family Phyllodactylidae. The species is endemic to Mexico.

== Etymology ==
The specific name, delcampoi, is in honor of Mexican herpetologist Rafael Martín del Campo y Sánchez.

== Geographic range ==
P. delcampoi is found in the Mexican state of Guerrero.

== Habitat ==
The preferred natural habitat of P. delcampoi is rock outcrops in forest, at altitudes of 1,000–1,200 m (3,300–3,900 ft).

== Behavior ==
P. delcampoi is terrestrial and saxicolous.

== Reproduction ==
P. delcampoi is oviparous.
