= Española leaf-toed gecko =

Scientific classification
- Kingdom: Animalia
- Phylum: Chordata
- Class: Reptilia
- Order: Squamata
- Suborder: Gekkota
- Family: Phyllodactylidae
- Genus: Phyllodactylus
- Species: P. gorii

Binomial name
- Phyllodactylus gorii Lanza, 1973

Species of lizard

The Española leaf-toed gecko (Phyllodactylus gorii) is a species of gecko. It is endemic to the Galapagos Islands.
