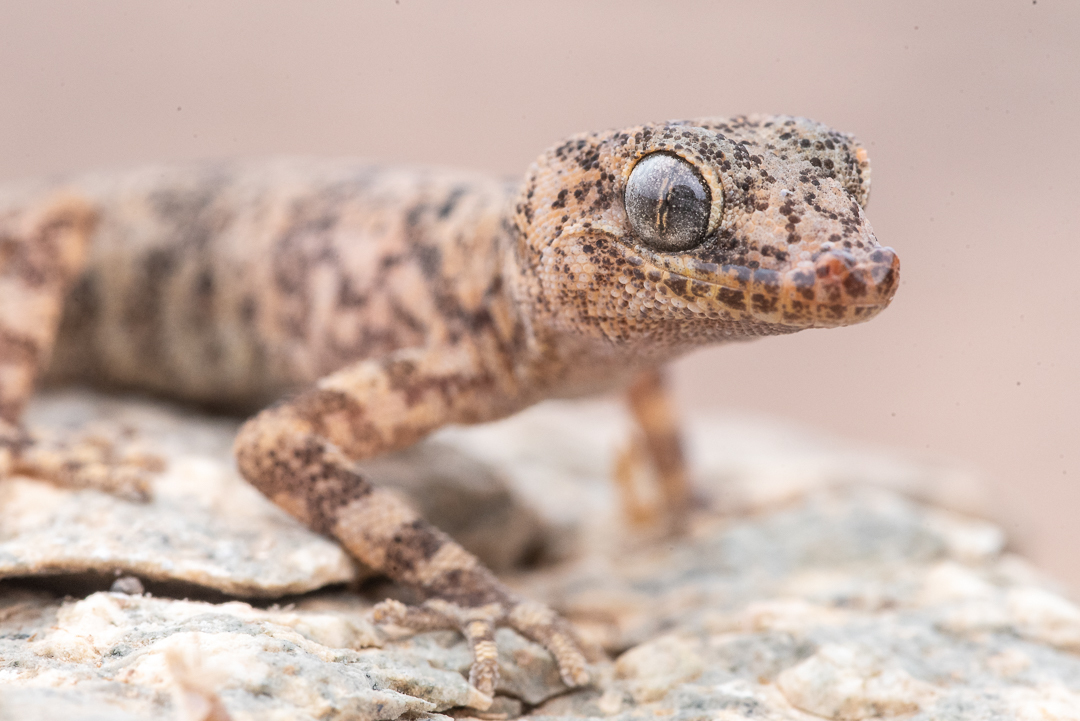

Conservation status
- Least Concern (IUCN 3.1)

Scientific classification
- Kingdom: Animalia
- Phylum: Chordata
- Class: Reptilia
- Order: Squamata
- Suborder: Gekkota
- Family: Phyllodactylidae
- Genus: Phyllodactylus
- Species: P. gerrhopygus

Binomial name
- Phyllodactylus gerrhopygus (Wiegmann, 1834)

Synonyms
- Diplodactylus gerrhopygus Wiegmann, 1834

= South American leaf-toed gecko =

Species of lizard

The South American leaf-toed gecko (Phyllodactylus gerrhopygus) is a species of gecko. It is found in Peru and Chile.
