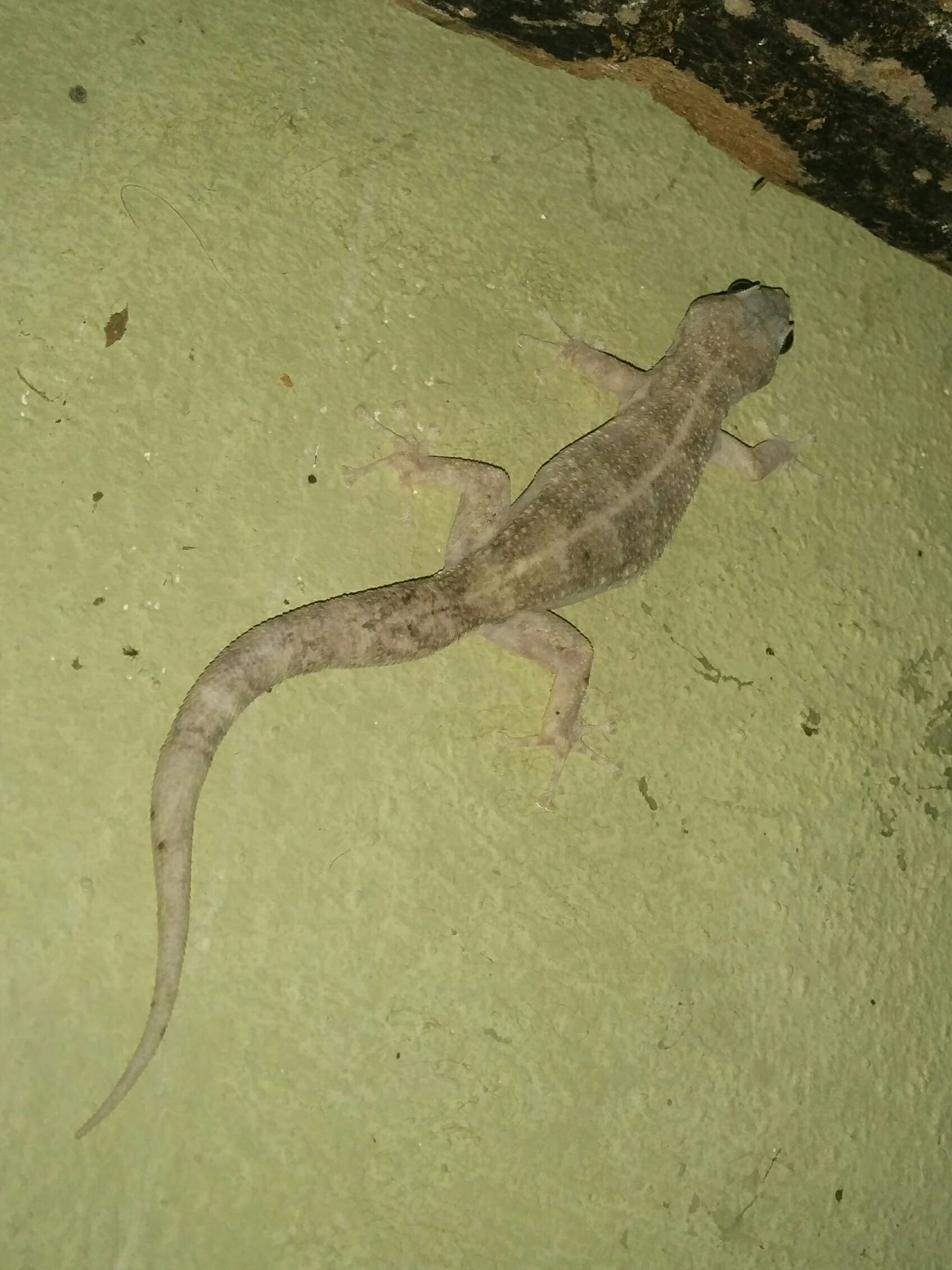

Conservation status
- Least Concern (IUCN 3.1)

Scientific classification
- Kingdom: Animalia
- Phylum: Chordata
- Class: Reptilia
- Order: Squamata
- Suborder: Gekkota
- Family: Phyllodactylidae
- Genus: Phyllodactylus
- Species: P. reissii

Binomial name
- Phyllodactylus reissii W. Peters, 1862

= Phyllodactylus reissii =

Peters' leaf-toed gecko

Species of lizard

Phyllodactylus reissii, also known commonly as Peters' leaf-toed gecko or the coastal leaf-toed gecko, is a species of lizard in the family Phyllodactylidae. The species is endemic to northwestern South America.

== Etymology ==
The specific name, reissii, is in honor of Carl Reiss who collected the holotype, while he was the Prussian consul in Guayaquil, Ecuador.

== Geographic range ==
P. reissii is native to Ecuador and Peru. There is an introduced population in the Galapagos.

== Habitat ==
The natural habitats of P. reissii are forest, shrubland, and desert, at altitudes of 0–2,000 m (0–6,562 ft).

== Description ==
P. reissii is large for its genus. Adults may attain a snout-to-vent length (SVL) of 7.5 cm (3.0 in).

== Reproduction ==
P. reissii is oviparous. The adult female lays a clutch of two eggs. Hatchlings have a snout-to-vent length (SVL) of 28–34 mm (1.1–1.3 in).
