= Galapagos leaf-toed gecko =

Conservation status
- Near Threatened (IUCN 3.1)

Scientific classification
- Kingdom: Animalia
- Phylum: Chordata
- Class: Reptilia
- Order: Squamata
- Suborder: Gekkota
- Family: Phyllodactylidae
- Genus: Phyllodactylus
- Species: P. galapagensis

Binomial name
- Phyllodactylus galapagensis Peters, 1869

Species of lizard

The Galapagos leaf-toed gecko (Phyllodactylus galapagensis) is a species of gecko. It is endemic to the Galapagos Islands.
