= Phyllodactylus simpsoni =

Scientific classification
- Kingdom: Animalia
- Phylum: Chordata
- Class: Reptilia
- Order: Squamata
- Suborder: Gekkota
- Family: Phyllodactylidae
- Genus: Phyllodactylus
- Species: P. simpsoni

Binomial name
- Phyllodactylus simpsoni Arteaga, Bustamante, Vieira, Tapia, & Guayasamin, 2019

Species of lizard

Simpson's leaf-toed gecko or Western Galápagos leaf-toed gecko (Phyllodactylus simpsoni) is a species of gecko. It is endemic to Isabela Island and Fernandina Island in the Galápagos Islands.
