= Sceloporus chaneyi =

Conservation status
- Endangered (IUCN 3.1)

Scientific classification
- Domain: Eukaryota
- Kingdom: Animalia
- Phylum: Chordata
- Class: Reptilia
- Order: Squamata
- Suborder: Iguania
- Family: Phrynosomatidae
- Genus: Sceloporus
- Species: S. chaneyi

Binomial name
- Sceloporus chaneyi Liner & Dixon, 1992

Species of lizard

Sceloporus chaneyi, the Peña Nevada agave lizard, Chaney's spiny lizard, or Chaney's bunchgrass lizard, is a species of lizard in the family Phrynosomatidae. It is endemic to Mexico.
