= Phyllodactylus duncanensis =

Scientific classification
- Kingdom: Animalia
- Phylum: Chordata
- Class: Reptilia
- Order: Squamata
- Suborder: Gekkota
- Family: Phyllodactylidae
- Genus: Phyllodactylus
- Species: P. duncanensis

Binomial name
- Phyllodactylus duncanensis Van Denburgh, 1912

Synonyms
- Phyllodactylus galapagensis duncanensis

Species of lizard

Phyllodactylus duncanensis is a species of gecko. It is endemic to the Galapagos Islands.
