= Leaf-toed gecko =

Leaf-toed gecko is a common name for some species and genera of gecko and refers to a divided, expanded adhesive pad at the distal end of the toe, resembling a ginkgo leaf. Members of the following genera are commonly called "leaf-toed" geckos:

- African leaf-toed geckos, Afrogecko, Kolekanos, and Ramigekko
- American leaf-toed geckos, Phyllodactylus, a genus whose name is literally "leaf-toed"
- Indochinese leaf-toed geckos, Dixonius
- Madagascar leaf-toed geckos, Ebenavia and Paroedura
- Southwest Asian leaf-toed geckos, Asaccus
- European leaf-toed gecko, Euleptes europaea
- Fan-footed geckos, Ptyodactylus
- Dwarf leaf-toed geckos, Goggia
- Péringuey's Coastal Leaf-toed Gecko (Cryptactites peringueyi), South Africa

The family Phyllodactylidae is also referred to as the "leaf-toed geckos" even though not all members of the family share this unique adaptation.
