= Phyllodactylus andysabini =

Scientific classification
- Kingdom: Animalia
- Phylum: Chordata
- Class: Reptilia
- Order: Squamata
- Suborder: Gekkota
- Family: Phyllodactylidae
- Genus: Phyllodactylus
- Species: P. andysabini

Binomial name
- Phyllodactylus andysabini Arteaga, Bustamante, Vieira, Tapia & Guayasamin, 2019

Species of lizard

Phyllodactylus andysabini, also known commonly as Andy Sabin's leaf-toed gecko or the Wolf Volcano leaf-toed gecko, is a species of lizard in the family Phyllodactylidae. The species is endemic to Isabela Island in the Galápagos Islands.
