= Phyllodactylus leei =

Conservation status
- Near Threatened (IUCN 3.1)

Scientific classification
- Kingdom: Animalia
- Phylum: Chordata
- Class: Reptilia
- Order: Squamata
- Suborder: Gekkota
- Family: Phyllodactylidae
- Genus: Phyllodactylus
- Species: P. leei

Binomial name
- Phyllodactylus leei Cope, 1889

Species of lizard

Phyllodactylus leei, also known commonly as the San Cristóbal Island leaf-toed gecko and the Chatham leaf-toed gecko, is a species of lizard in the family Phyllodactylidae. The species is endemic to San Cristóbal Island in the Galapagos Islands.

== Etymology ==
The specific name, leei, is in honor of American naturalist Dr. Thomas Lee, who was on board the United States Fish Commission (USFC) research vessel USS Albatross when she visited Chatham Island in 1888.

== Reproduction ==
P. leei is oviparous. Eggs are laid in rocky areas in October and November.
