= Gilbert's leaf-toed gecko =

Conservation status
- Data Deficient (IUCN 3.1)

Scientific classification
- Kingdom: Animalia
- Phylum: Chordata
- Class: Reptilia
- Order: Squamata
- Suborder: Gekkota
- Family: Phyllodactylidae
- Genus: Phyllodactylus
- Species: P. gilberti

Binomial name
- Phyllodactylus gilberti Heller, 1903

Species of lizard

Gilbert's leaf-toed gecko (Phyllodactylus gilberti), also known commonly as the Wenman Island gecko, is a species of lizard in the family Phyllodactylidae. The species is endemic to the Galapagos Islands.

== Etymology ==
The specific name, gilberti, is in honor of American ichthyologist Charles Henry Gilbert.

== Geographic range ==
P. gilberti is only found on two small islands, Darwin Island and Wolf Island, in the Galápagos archipelago of Ecuador.

The type locality is "Wenman Island", which is a name previously used for Wolf Island.

== Habitat ==
The preferred natural habitats of P. gilberti are shrubland and rocky areas at altitudes from sea level to 70 m (230 ft).

== Description ==
P. gilberti may attain a snout-to-vent length (SVL) of 55.5 mm (2.19 in). Dorsally, it is slate-blue with darker blotches and spots. There is a light gray stripe from the nape of the neck to the middle of the back. Ventrally, it is pale lemon-colored, except for the throat which is light flesh-colored.

== Reproduction ==
P. gilberti is oviparous.
