= Phyllodactylus maresi =

Mares's leaf-toed gecko

Scientific classification
- Domain: Eukaryota
- Kingdom: Animalia
- Phylum: Chordata
- Class: Reptilia
- Order: Squamata
- Infraorder: Gekkota
- Family: Phyllodactylidae
- Genus: Phyllodactylus
- Species: P. maresi

Binomial name
- Phyllodactylus maresi Lanza, 1973

Species of lizard

Mares's leaf-toed gecko (Phyllodactylus maresi) is a species of gecko. It is endemic to the Galapagos Islands.
