= Darwin's leaf-toed gecko =

Conservation status
- Near Threatened (IUCN 3.1)

Scientific classification
- Kingdom: Animalia
- Phylum: Chordata
- Class: Reptilia
- Order: Squamata
- Suborder: Gekkota
- Family: Phyllodactylidae
- Genus: Phyllodactylus
- Species: P. darwini

Binomial name
- Phyllodactylus darwini Taylor, 1942

Species of lizard

Darwin's leaf-toed gecko (Phyllodactylus darwini) is a species of lizard in the family Phyllodactylidae. The species is endemic to San Cristóbal Island in the Galapagos.

== Etymology ==
The specific name, darwini, is in honor of English naturalist Charles Darwin, author of On the Origin of Species.

== Habitat ==
The preferred natural habitat of P. darwini is shrubland.

== Reproduction ==
P. darwini is oviparous.
