= Polytus mellerborgi =

Scientific classification
- Kingdom: Animalia
- Phylum: Arthropoda
- Class: Insecta
- Order: Coleoptera
- Suborder: Polyphaga
- Infraorder: Cucujiformia
- Family: Curculionidae
- Genus: Polytus
- Species: P. mellerborgi

Binomial name
- Polytus mellerborgi Heller, 1927

Species of beetle

Polytus mellerborgi, commonly known as small banana weevil, is a species of weevil widely distributed in southeastern Polynesia through Melanesia, Micronesia, Indo-Malaya, South China, Myanmar (formerly Burma), India, Sri Lanka, other islands of the Indian Ocean to Madagascar and as far as Mexico and Central America.

== Description ==
This small beetle is about 1.0 cm to 1.1 cm in length excluding the rostrum. Due to the characteristic black color, the species can be misidentified as a diminutive form of Cosmopolites sordidus. Antennae composed of eight antennomeres, a scape, pedicel and flagellum composed of six flagellomeres. The last flagellomere is the antennal club. Both flagellum and antennal club composed of most sensilla. According to research, there are five types of sensilla: sensilla trichodea, sensilla chaetica type 1 and 2, sensilla basiconica, and sensilla gemmiformia; and cuticular grooves found in the species.

== Biology ==
It is one of the most common pests that attack banana and plantain plants. Adults are found in numbers in decaying trunks and bores in the decaying corms and stalks of banana.
