= James R. Dixon =

American herpetologist

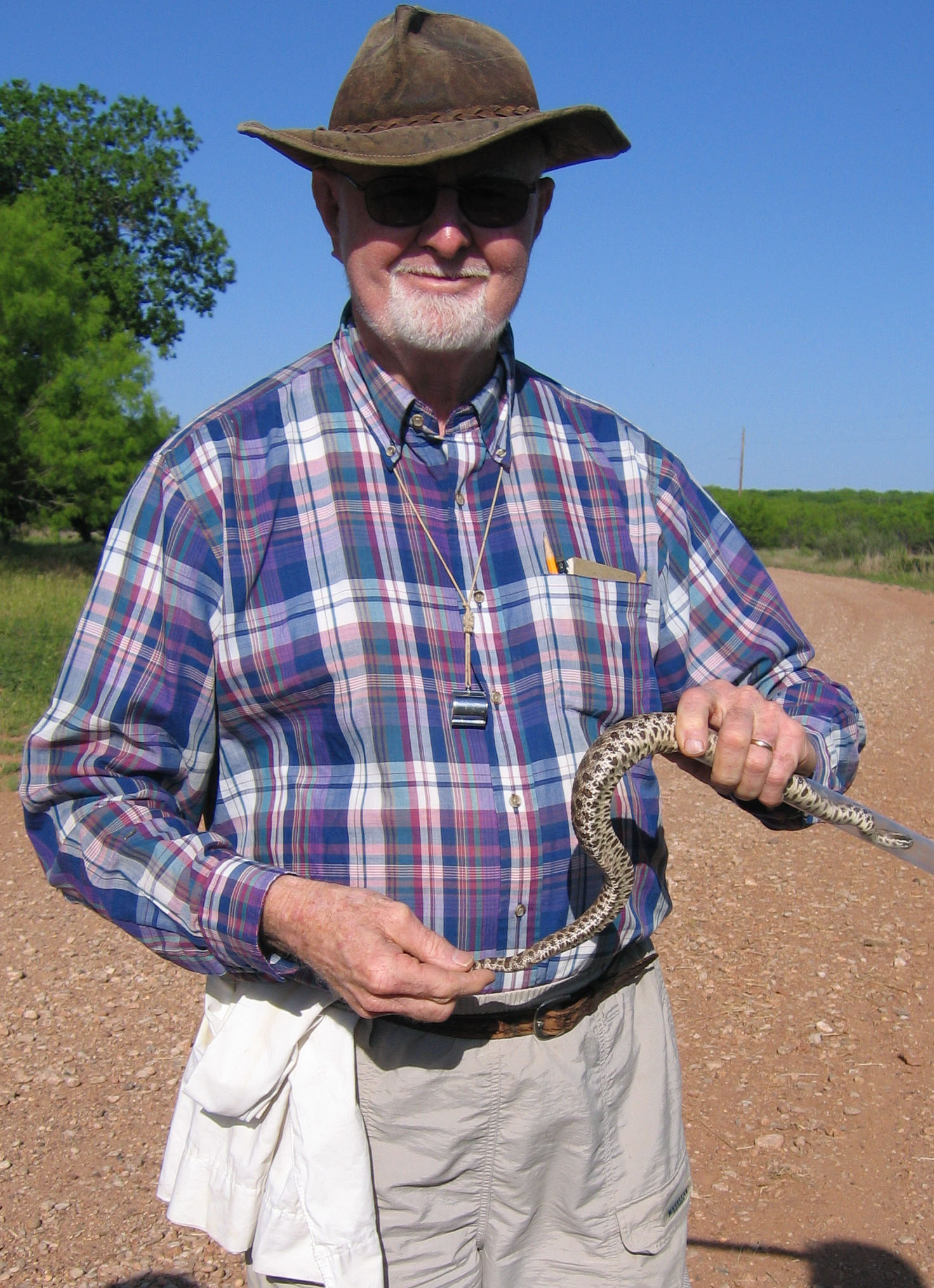
Dr. James Dixon with a rattlesnake in April, 2005.

James Ray Dixon (August 1, 1928, in Houston, Texas – January 10, 2015, in Bryan, Texas) was professor emeritus and curator emeritus of amphibians and reptiles at the Texas Cooperative Wildlife Collection at Texas A&M University. He lived in El Campo, Texas, throughout most of his childhood. He published prolifically on the subject of herpetology in his distinguished career, authoring and co-authoring several books, book chapters, and numerous peer reviewed notes and articles, describing two new genera, and many new species, earning him a reputation as one of the most prominent herpetologists of his generation. His main research focus was morphology based systematics of amphibians and reptiles worldwide with emphasis on Texas, US, Mexico, Central America, and South America, although bibliographies, conservation, ecology, life history and zoogeography have all been the subjects of his extensive publications.

== Eponyms ==
A genus of lizards, Dixonius Bauer, Good & Branch, 1997, leaf-toed geckos from Southeast Asia, was named in his honor as well as several species of reptiles and amphibians, e.g., the white-lipped peeping frog, Eleutherodactylus dixoni J.D. Lynch, 1991 (= Eleutherodactylus albolabris Taylor, 1943); Dixon's peeping frog, Eleutherodactylus jamesdixoni Devitt et al, 2023; the gray checkered whiptail, Cnemidophorus dixoni Scudday, 1973 (= Aspidoscelis tesselatus (Say, 1823)); Dixon's leaf-toed gecko, Phyllodactylus dixoni Rivero-Blanco & Lancini, 1968; and the large-eyed snake, Thamnodynastes dixoni Bailey & R.A. Thomas, 2007.

== Education and early career ==
Dixon attained his Bachelor of Science from Howard Payne University (1950), and then served in the Korean War (1951–1953). Upon returning from the war, he briefly acted as Curator of Reptiles at the Ross Allen Reptile Institute from 1954 to 1955. He earned his master's degree (1957) and PhD in (1961) from Texas A&M University. He was an associate professor of veterinary medicine at Texas A&M from 1959 until 1961.

== Career ==
From 1961 until 1965 he was an associate professor of wildlife management at New Mexico State University and served as a consultant to the New Mexico state Game and Fisheries department. He was on the faculty of the University of Southern California and from 1965 until 1967 he was Curator of Herpetology at the Life Sciences Division at the Los Angeles County Museum in California. In 1967 he returned to Texas to become a professor at Texas A&M University, teaching wildlife and fisheries science, and curator of the Texas Cooperative Wildlife Collection or TCWC (recently renamed Biodiversity Research and Teaching Collections or BRTC). Over 20 herpetologists earned Ph.D.s studying under him at Texas A&M University. He has also served as president of several herpetological and naturalist societies including The Herpetologist League, Texas Herpetological Society, Texas Academy of Science; Society for the Study of Amphibians and Reptiles, Southwestern Association of Naturalists, and on the board of directors of the Texas Systems of Natural Laboratories. He has also served on the faculty of Stephen F. Austin State University and Texas State University.

=== New genera of reptiles described by James R. Dixon ===
Listed in chronological order.

- Crenadactylus Dixon & Kluge, 1964 – tiny Australian clawless geckos
- Asaccus Dixon & S. Anderson, 1973 – Southwest Asian leaf-toed geckos

=== A partial list of new amphibian and reptile species described by James R. Dixon ===
Listed in chronological order.

- Eleutherodactylus dilatus (Davis & Dixon, 1955) – Guerreran peeping frog
- Eleutherodactylus grandis (Dixon, 1957) – great peeping frog
- Coleonyx reticulatus Davis & Dixon, 1958 – reticulate banded gecko
- Eleutherodactylus rufescens (Duellman & Dixon, 1959) – red peeping frog
- Phyllodactylus duellmani Dixon, 1960 – Duellman's pigmy leaf-toed gecko
- Phyllodactylus insularis Dixon, 1960 – Belize leaf-toed gecko
- Phyllodactylus paucituberculatus Dixon, 1960 – Rio Marquez Valley gecko
- Ambystoma flavipiperatum Dixon, 1963 – yellow-peppered salamander
- Phyllodactylus davisi Dixon, 1964 – Davis' leaf-toed gecko
- Phyllodactylus nocticolus Dixon, 1964 – peninsula leaf-toed gecko
- Eleutherodactylus nivicolimae (Dixon & Webb, 1966) – Nevado de Colima chirping frog
- Phyllodactylus angelensis Dixon, 1966 – Angel Island leaf-toed gecko
- Phyllodactylus apricus Dixon, 1966 – Las Animas Island gecko
- Phyllodactylus bugastrolepis Dixon, 1966 – Catalina Island leaf-toed gecko
- Phyllodactylus partidus Dixon, 1966 – Isla Partida Norte leaf-toed gecko
- Phyllodactylus santacruzensis Dixon, 1966 – Santa Cruz leaf-toed gecko
- Phyllodactylus tinklei Dixon, 1966 – Raza Island leaf-toed gecko
- Phyllodactylus palmeus Dixon, 1968 – Honduras leaf-toed gecko
- Phyllodactylus angustidigitus Dixon & Huey, 1970 – narrow leaf-toed gecko
- Phyllodactylus clinatus Dixon & Huey, 1970 – Cerro Illescas gecko
- Phyllodactylus interandinus Dixon & Huey, 1970 – Andes leaf-toed gecko
- Phyllodactylus johnwrighti Dixon & Huey, 1970 – Rio Huancabamba leaf-toed gecko
- Phyllodactylus kofordi Dixon & Huey, 1970 – coastal leaf-toed gecko
- Phyllodactylus pumilus Dixon & Huey, 1970 – leaf-toed gecko
- Phyllodactylus sentosus Dixon & Huey, 1970 – Lima leaf-toed gecko
- Pseudogonatodes peruvianus Huey & Dixon, 1970 – Peru clawed gecko
- Sceloporus exsul Dixon, Ketchersid & Lieb, 1972 – Queretaran desert spiny lizard
- Hypsiglena tanzeri Dixon & Lieb, 1972 – Tanzer's night snake
- Bachia huallagana Dixon, 1973 – Dixon's bachia
- Asaccus griseonotus Dixon & S. Anderson, 1973 – gray-marked gecko
- Rhachisaurus brachylepis (Dixon, 1974) – Dixon's antosaura
- Anotosaura vanzolinia Dixon, 1974 – Vanzolini's antosaura
- Helicops yacu Rossman & Dixon, 1975 – Peru keelback
- Bachia guianensis Hoogmoed & Dixon, 1977 – Guyana bachia
- Erythrolamprus pyburni (Markezich & Dixon, 1979) – Pyburn's tropical forest snake
- Typhlops minuisquamus Dixon & Hendricks, 1979 – basin worm snake
- Typhlops paucisquamus Dixon & Hendricks, 1979 – Pernambuco worm snake
- Kentropyx vanzoi Gallagher & Dixon, 1980 – Gallagher's kentropyx
- Neusticurus medemi Dixon & Lamar, 1981 – Medem's neisticurus
- Erythrolamprus andinus (Dixon, 1983) – ground snake
- Liotyphlops argaleus Dixon & Kofron, 1984 – ground snake
- Erythrolamprus atraventer (Dixon & R.A. Thomas, 1985) – Dixon's ground snake
- Erythrolamprus maryellenae (Dixon, 1985) – Mary Ellen's ground snake
- Lygophis vanzolinii (Dixon, 1985) – Vanzolini's ground snake
- Cnemidophorus gramivagus McCrystal & Dixon, 1987 – whiptail lizard
- Erythrolamprus ceii (Dixon, 1991) – Cei's ground snake
- Sceloporus chaneyi Liner & Dixon, 1992 – Chaney's bunchgrass lizard
- Chironius laurenti Dixon, Wiest & Cei, 1993 – Laurent's sipo
- Chironius septentrionalis Dixon, Wiest & Cei, 1993 – South American sipo
- Tantilla johnsoni Wilson, Vaughn & Dixon, 1999 – Chiapan centipede snake
- Erythrolamprus janaleeae (Dixon, 2000) – ground snake
- Erythrolamprus vitti (Dixon, 2000) – Vitt's ground snake
- Micrurus tamaulipensis Lavin-Murcio & Dixon, 2004 – Sierra de Tamaulipas coral snake
- Lampropeltis webbi Bryson, Dixon & Lazcano, 2005 – Webb's kingsnake
- Pristimantis waoranii (McCracken, Forstner & Dixon, 2007) – South American rain frog

Nota bene: A binomial authority in parentheses indicates that the species was originally described in a different genus.

== External links and further reading ==
- Altig R (2012). "Academic Lineages of Doctoral Degrees in Herpetology (third edition)". pp. 471–564. In: Adler K (2012). Contributions to the History of Herpetology. Society for the Study of Amphibians and Reptiles. 564 pp.
- Bailey JR, Thomas RA (2007). "A revision of the South American snake genus Thamnodynastes Wagler, 1830 (Serpentes, Colubridae, Tachymenini). II. Three new species from northern South America, with further descriptions of Thamnodynastes gambotensis Pérez-Santos and Moreno and Thamnodynastes ramonriveroi Manzanilla & Sánchez". Memoria de la Fundación La Salle de Ciencias Naturales 166: 7-27.
- Bauer AM, Good DA, Branch WR (1997). "The taxonomy of the Southern African leaf-toed geckos (Squamata: Gekkonidae), with a review of Old World "Phyllodactylus" and the description of five new genera". Proc. California Acad. Sci. 49 (14): 447–497.
- Beltz, Ellin (2006). Biographies of People Honored in the Herpetological Nomenclature in North America
- Hibbitts, Toby J.; Vaughan, R. Kathryn; Sites, Jack W. Jr; Fitzgerald, Lee A. (2018). "James Ray Dixon (1928–2015)". Herpetological Review 49 (1): 168–174.
- Lynch JD (1991). "Three replacement names for preoccupied names in the genus Eleutherodactylus(Amphibia: Leptodactylidae)". Copeia 1991: 1138–1139.
- McAllister, Chris T.; Forstner, Michael R.J. (2015). "In Memoriam: James Ray Dixon, A Texas Herpetological Icon (1928–2015)" (PDF). Herpetological Conservation and Biology. 10 (1): 1–125.
- Rivero-Blanco C, Lancini AR (1968) (1967). "Phyllodactylus dixoni: una nueva especie de lagarto (Sauria: Gekkoninae) de Venezuela ". Memoria de la Sociedad de Ciencias Naturales La Salle 78: 168−175. (in Spanish).
- Scudday JF (1973). "A New Species of Lizard of the Cnemidophorus tesselatus Group from Texas". Journal of Herpetology 7 (4): 363–371.
- Smith HM, Smith RB (1973). Synopsis of the Herpetofauna of Mexico, Vol. II: Analysis of the Literature Exclusive of the Mexican Axolotl. Augusta, West Virginia: Eric Lundberg. xxxiii + 367 pp.
- Texas Cooperative Wildlife Collection
