= Raymond B. Huey =

Raymond Brunson Huey (born 14 September 1944) is a biologist specializing in evolutionary physiology. He has taught at the University of Washington (UW), and he earned his Ph.D. in biology at Harvard University under E. E. Williams. He has recently been the chair of the university's biology department, but a retirement celebration was held on 4 Oct. 2013 in Seattle.

== Education ==
After attending Deep Springs College, Huey earned his A.B. with honors in Zoology in 1966 from the University of California, Berkeley. In 1966, he earned his M.A. in Zoology from the University of Texas at Austin, working with Eric R. Pianka. He then earned his Ph.D. from Harvard in 1975.

== Awards ==
In 1991, he received the Distinguished Herpetologist Award from the Herpetologists League, and in 1998, he was awarded a Guggenheim Fellowship in Organismic Biology & Ecology. He was elected a Fellow of the Ecological Society of America in 2017. In 2024, Huey was elected a member of the National Academy of Sciences.

== See also ==
- Beneficial acclimation hypothesis
- Comparative physiology
- Ecophysiology
- Evolutionary physiology
- Experimental evolution
- Herpetology
- Phylogenetic comparative methods
