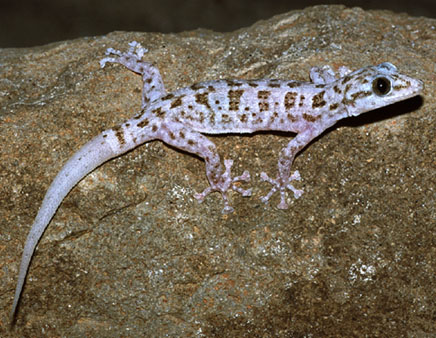
- Leaf-toed gecko (Phyllodactylus xanti)

Scientific classification
- Kingdom: Animalia
- Phylum: Chordata
- Class: Reptilia
- Order: Squamata
- Clade: Gekkonomorpha
- Suborder: Gekkota
- Superfamily: Gekkonoidea
- Family: Phyllodactylidae; Gamble et al., 2008

Genera
- See text

= Phyllodactylidae =

Family of geckos

The Phyllodactylidae are a family of geckos (Gekkota) consisting of 163 species in 10 genera, distributed throughout the New World, North Africa, Europe and the Middle East. The family was first delineated based on a molecular phylogenetic analysis in 2008, and all members possess a unique single codon deletion in the phosducin (PDC) gene. The phyllodactylid genus Bogertia has been recently synonymized with Phyllopezus. The name of the family comes from the leaf shaped fingers.

== Genera ==
These genera are considered members of the Phyllodactylidae:

List of genera
Genus	Image	Type species	Taxon author	Common name	Species
Asaccus	A. elisae	A. elisae (F. Werner, 1895)	Dixon & S. Anderson, 1973	Southwest Asian leaf-toed geckos	18
Garthia	G. gaudichaudii	G. gaudichaudii (A.M.C. Duméril & Bibron, 1836)	Donoso-Barros & Vanzolini, 1965	Chilean marked geckos	2
Gymnodactylus	G. geckoides	G. geckoides Spix, 1825	Spix, 1825	Naked-toed geckos	5
Haemodracon	H. riebeckii	H. riebeckii (W. Peters, 1882)	Bauer, Good & Branch, 1997		2
Homonota	H. septentrionalis	H. horrida (Burmeister, 1861)	Gray, 1845	Marked geckos	14
Phyllodactylus	P. lanei	P. pulcher Gray, 1828	Gray, 1828	American leaf-toed geckos	65
Phyllopezus	P. pollicaris	P. pollicaris (Spix, 1825)	W. Peters, 1877		8
Ptyodactylus	P. guttatus	P. hasselquistii (Donndorff, 1798)	Goldfuss, 1820	Fan-fingered geckos	12
Tarentola	T. mauritanica	T. mauritanica (Linnaeus, 1758)	Gray, 1825	Wall geckos	33
Thecadactylus	T. solimoensis	T. rapicauda (Houttuyn, 1782)	Goldfuss, 1820	Turnip-tailed geckos	3
