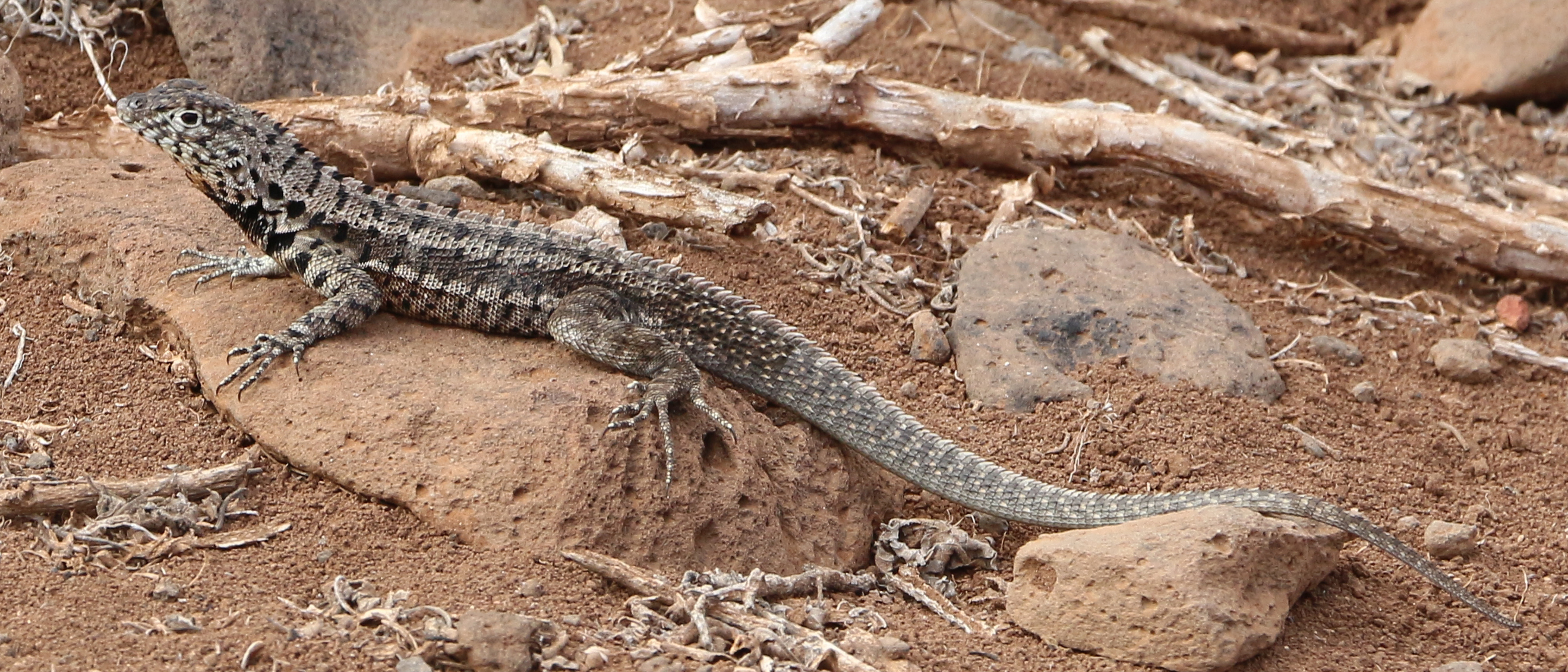
- Male
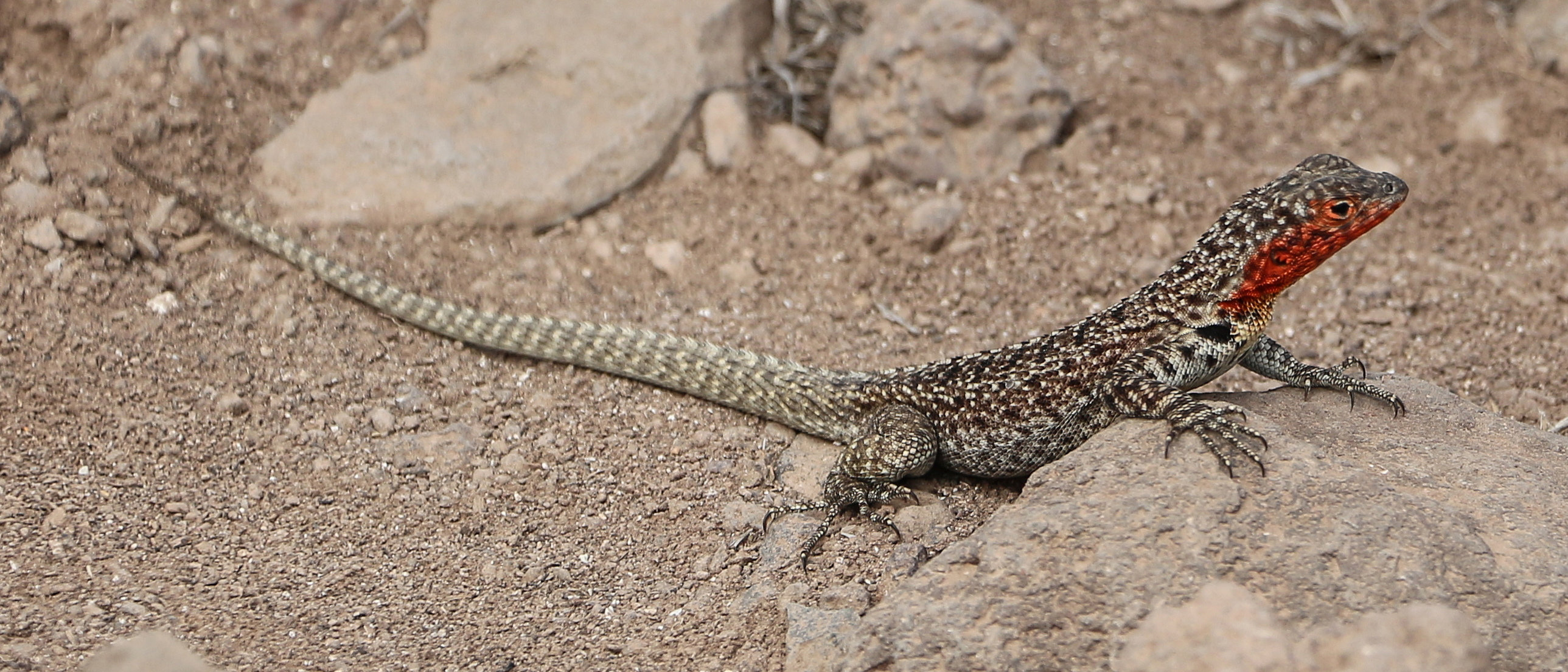
- Female

Scientific classification
- Kingdom: Animalia
- Phylum: Chordata
- Class: Reptilia
- Order: Squamata
- Suborder: Iguania
- Family: Tropiduridae
- Genus: Microlophus
- Species: M. barringtonensis

Binomial name
- Microlophus barringtonensis (Baur, 1892)

= Microlophus barringtonensis =

Species of lava lizard

Microlophus barringtonensis or the Santa Fe lava lizard is a species of lava lizard or a population of Microlophus albemarlensis. It inhabits Santa Fe island in the Galápagos. It is the only lava lizard on Santa Fe. It is extremely common.

== Etymology ==
barringtonensis refers to its range in Santa Fe island, formerly named Barrington Island.

== Classification ==
It is debated whether the species is a population or not. Authors have claimed that the population is an entire other species along with M. jacobi and M. indefatigabilis. This view is not widely accepted.
