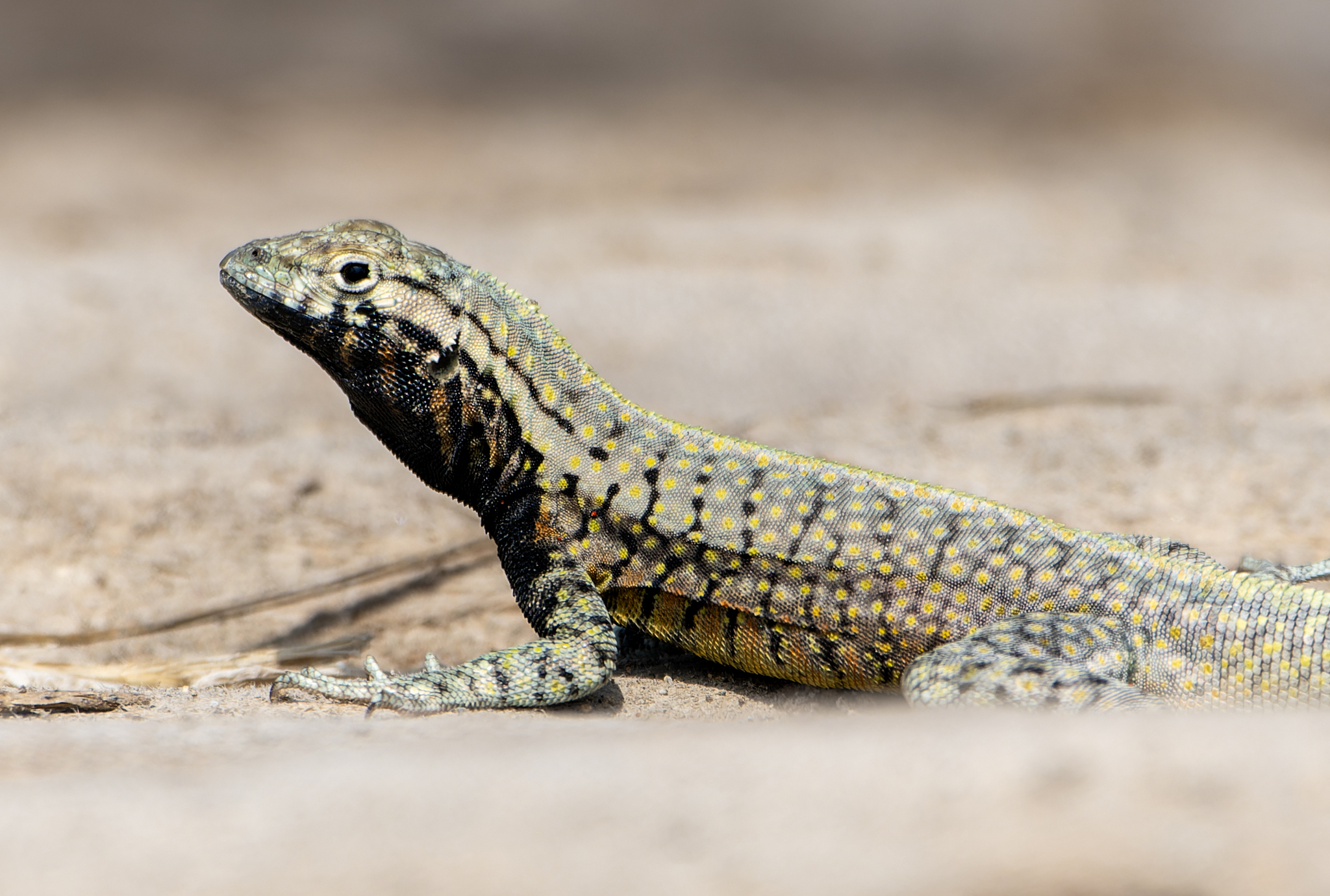
- Microlophus peruvianus

Scientific classification
- Kingdom: Animalia
- Phylum: Chordata
- Class: Reptilia
- Order: Squamata
- Suborder: Iguania
- Family: Tropiduridae
- Genus: Microlophus; A.M.C. Duméril & Bibron, 1837

Type species
- Iguana peruviana Lesson, 1830

Species
- around 20

= Microlophus =

Genus of lizards

Microlophus is a genus of tropidurid lizards native to South America. Around 20 species are recognized and 10 of these are endemic to the Galápagos Islands, (Note: Some authors consider certain island populations of M. albemarlensis to be distinct species.) where they are commonly known as lava lizards (they are sometimes placed in Tropidurus instead). The remaining, which often are called Pacific iguanas, are found in the Andes and along the Pacific coasts of Chile, Peru, and Ecuador.

The distribution of the lava lizards and their variations in shape, colour, and behaviour show the phenomenon of adaptive radiation so typical of the inhabitants of this archipelago. One species occurs on all the central and western islands, which were perhaps connected during periods of lower sea levels, while one species each occurs on six other more peripheral islands. All have most likely evolved from a single ancestral species. However, as usual for the Tropiduridae, they can change their colour individually to some extent, and members of the same species occurring in different habitats also show colour differences. Thus, animals living mainly on dark lava are darker than ones that live in lighter, sandy environments.

== Evolution ==
=== Galápagos adaptive radiation ===
The genus Microlophus colonized the Galápagos archipelago on two separate occasions, both during the Pleistocene. Most of the Galápagos endemic species radiated from the first colonization event known as the Western radiation. Two species, M. bivittatus and M. habelii, radiated from the second colonization event, and are sister to the continental species M. occipitalis.

Historically, the species M. albemarlensis was considered to occur on Isabela, Fernandina, Santiago, Santa Cruz, and Santa Fe islands. The species was later realized to actually be a species complex, and more recently, the Santiago, Santa Cruz, and Santa Fe populations have been given species status as M. jacobii, M. indefatigabilis, and M. barringtonensis, respectively. This restricts the range of M. albemarlensis to the Isabela and Fernandina islands.

== Species ==
Listed alphabetically by specific name.

Species	Common name	Distribution	Image
Microlophus albemarlensis (Baur, 1890)	Galápagos lava lizard, Isabela lava lizard	Galápagos (Isabela, Fernandina)	
Microlophus arenarius (Tschudi, 1845)		Peru	
Microlophus atacamensis (Donoso-Barros, 1960)	Atacamen Pacific iguana	Chile	
Microlophus barringtonensis (Baur, 1892)	Santa Fe lava lizard	Galápagos (Santa Fe)	
Microlophus bivittatus (W. Peters, 1871)	San Cristóbal lava lizard	Galápagos (San Cristóbal)	
Microlophus delanonis (Baur, 1890)	Española lava lizard, Hood lava lizard	Galápagos (Española)	
Microlophus duncanensis (Baur, 1890)	Pinzón lava lizard	Galápagos (Pinzón)	
Microlophus grayii (Bell, 1843)	Floreana lava lizard	Galápagos (Floreana)	
Microlophus habelii (Steindachner, 1876)	Marchena lava lizard	Galápagos (Marchena)	
Microlophus heterolepis (Wiegmann, 1834)		Chile, Peru	
Microlophus indefatigabilis (Baur, 1890)	Santa Cruz lava lizard	Galápagos (Santa Cruz)	
Microlophus jacobii (Baur, 1892)	Santiago lava lizard	Galápagos (Santiago, Bartolomé, Rábida)	
Microlophus koepckeorum (Mertens, 1956)	Frost's iguana	Peru	
Microlophus occipitalis (W. Peters, 1871)	knobbed Pacific iguana	Peru, Ecuador	
Microlophus pacificus (Steindachner, 1876)	Pinta lava lizard, common Pacific iguana	Galápagos (Pinta)	
Microlophus peruvianus (Lesson, 1830)	Peru Pacific iguana	Ecuador, Peru, Chile	
Microlophus quadrivittatus (Tschudi, 1845)	four-banded Pacific iguana	Peru, Chile	
Microlophus slevini Torres-Carvajal, 2024	Slevin’s lava lizard	Galápagos (Gardner)	
Microlophus tarapacensis (Donoso-Barros, 1966)	Tarapaca Pacific iguana	Chile	
Microlophus theresiae (Steindachner, 1901)	Theresia's Pacific iguana	Peru	
Microlophus theresioides (Donoso-Barros, 1966)	corredor de pica (in Spanish)	Chile	
Microlophus thoracicus (Tschudi, 1845)	Tschudi's Pacific iguana	Peru	
Microlophus tigris (Tschudi, 1845)	tiger Pacific iguana	Peru	
Microlophus yanezi (Ortiz-Zapata, 1980)	Yanez's lava lizard	Chile	

Nota bene: A binomial authority in parentheses indicates that the species was originally described in a genus other than Microlophus.
