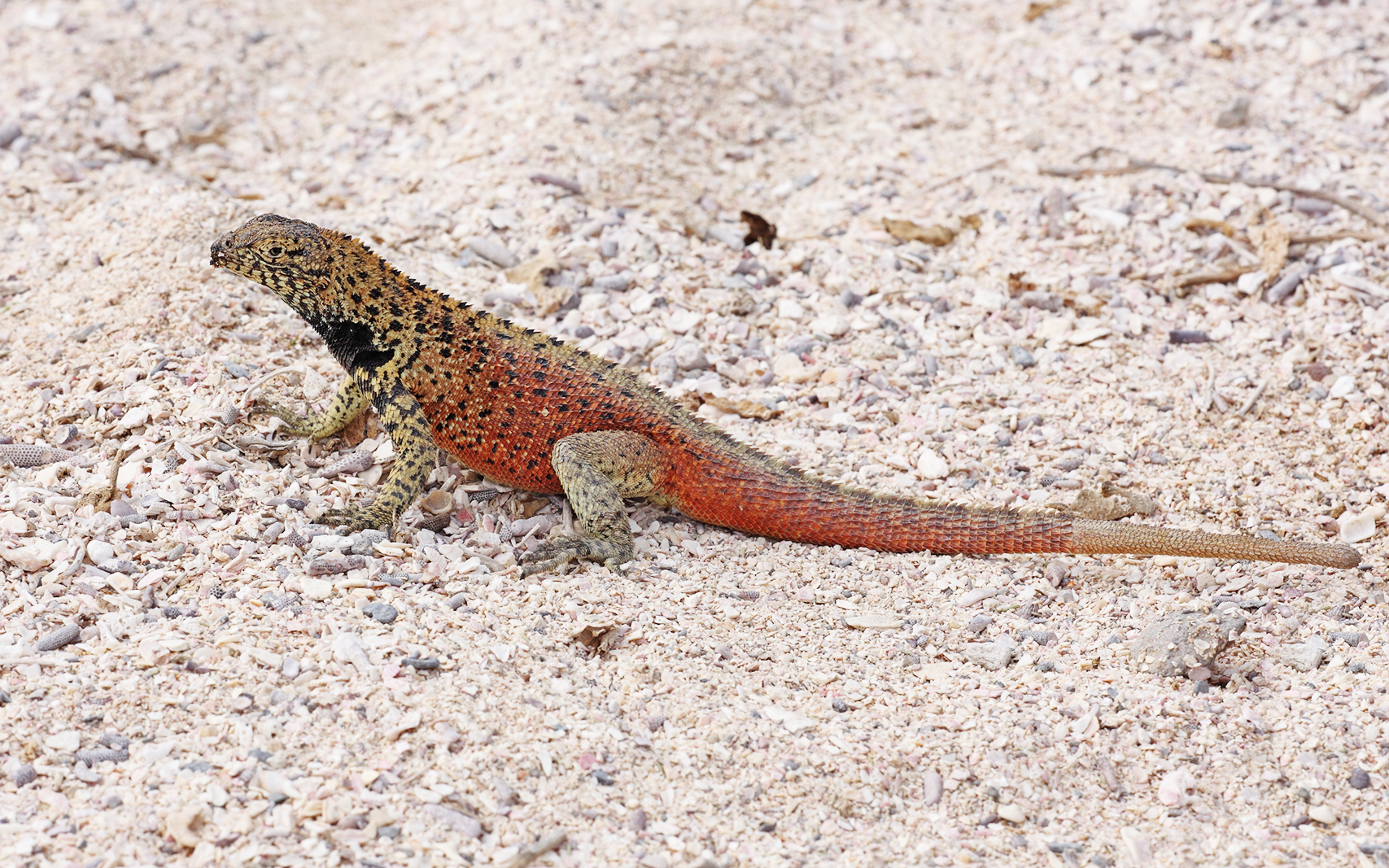
- Male
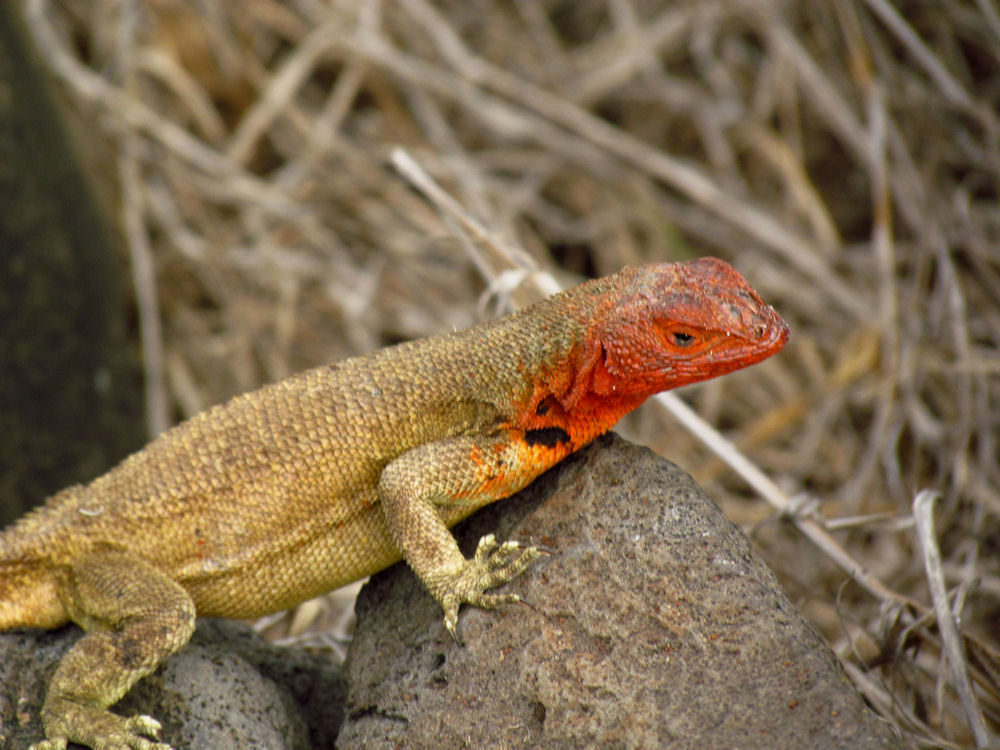
- Female

Conservation status
- Least Concern (IUCN 3.1)

Scientific classification
- Kingdom: Animalia
- Phylum: Chordata
- Class: Reptilia
- Order: Squamata
- Suborder: Iguania
- Family: Tropiduridae
- Genus: Microlophus
- Species: M. delanonis

Binomial name
- Microlophus delanonis (Baur, 1890)

Synonyms
- Tropidurus delanonis; Tropidurus hoodensis

= Microlophus delanonis =

Espańola lava lizard

Species of lizard

Microlophus delanonis, the Española lava lizard or Hood lava lizard, is endemic to the Galapagos island of Española. The species is commonly attributed to the genus Microlophus but has been attributed to the genus Tropidurus.
