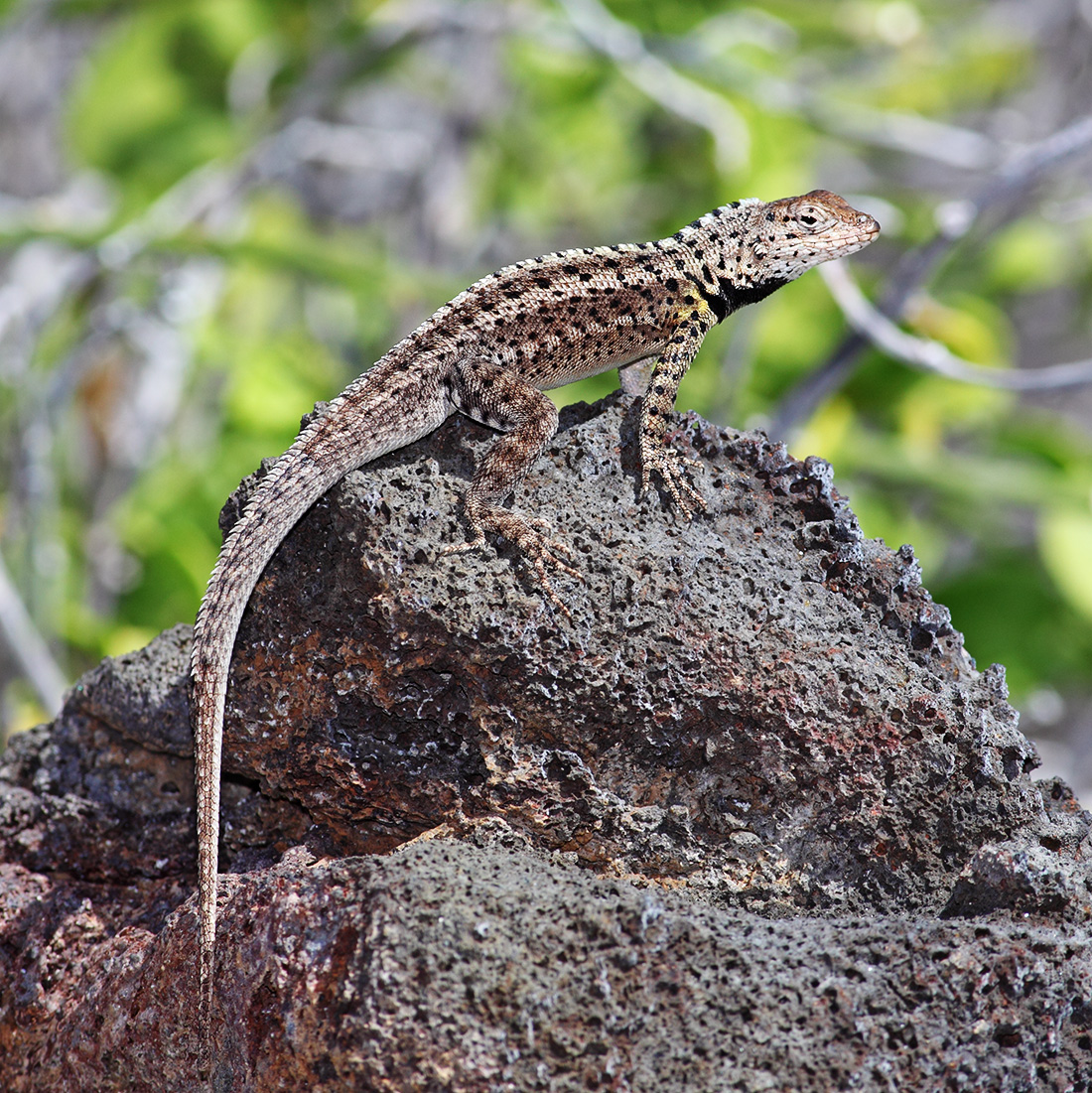
- Male
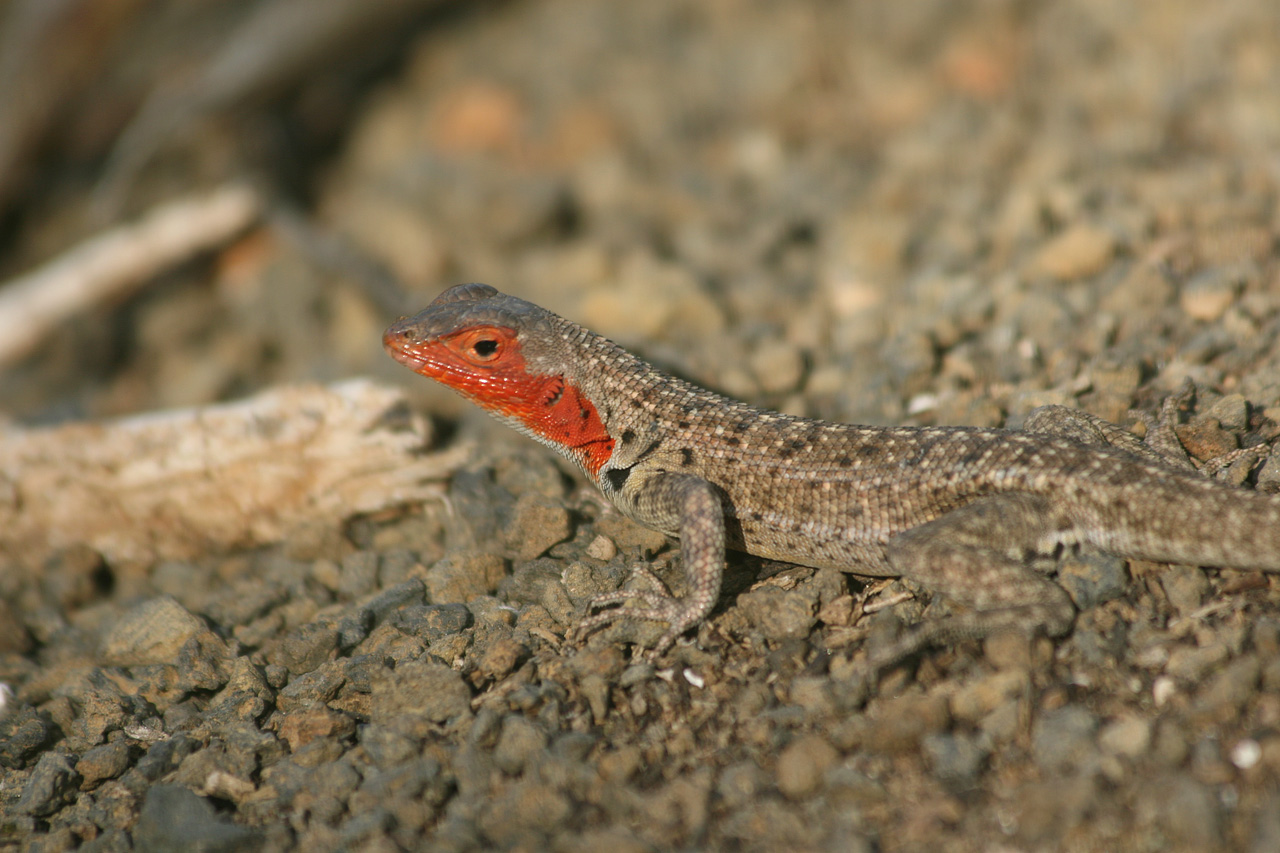
- Female

Conservation status
- Near Threatened (IUCN 3.1)

Scientific classification
- Kingdom: Animalia
- Phylum: Chordata
- Class: Reptilia
- Order: Squamata
- Suborder: Iguania
- Family: Tropiduridae
- Genus: Microlophus
- Species: M. grayii

Binomial name
- Microlophus grayii (Bell, 1843)

Synonyms
- Leiocephalus grayii Bell, 1843; Tropidurus (Craniopeltis) grayii — W. Peters, 1871; Leiocephalus grayii — Günther, 1877; Tropidurus grayi — Boulenger, 1885; Tropidurus delanonis Baur, 1890; Tropidurus duncanensis Baur, 1890; Microlophus grayii — Frost, 1992

= Microlophus grayii =

Species of lizard

Microlophus grayii, also commonly known as the Floreana lava lizard, Gray's lava lizard, and Gray's Pacific iguana, is a species of lava lizard in the family Tropiduridae. The species is endemic to the Galapagos island of Floreana.

== Taxonomy ==
The species, Microlophus grayii, is commonly assigned to the genus Microlophus but has been assigned to the genus Tropidurus. It has also been assigned to the family Tropiduridae.

== Etymology ==
The specific name, grayii, is in honor of British herpetologist John Edward Gray.

== Geographic range ==
M. grayii is found on Floreana Island including its islets Champion and Gardner, in the Galapagos, Ecuador.

== Habitat ==
The preferred natural habitat of M. grayii is shrubland, at altitudes from sea level to 640 m (2,100 ft), but it has also been found in urban areas.

== Reproduction ==
M. grayii is oviparous.
