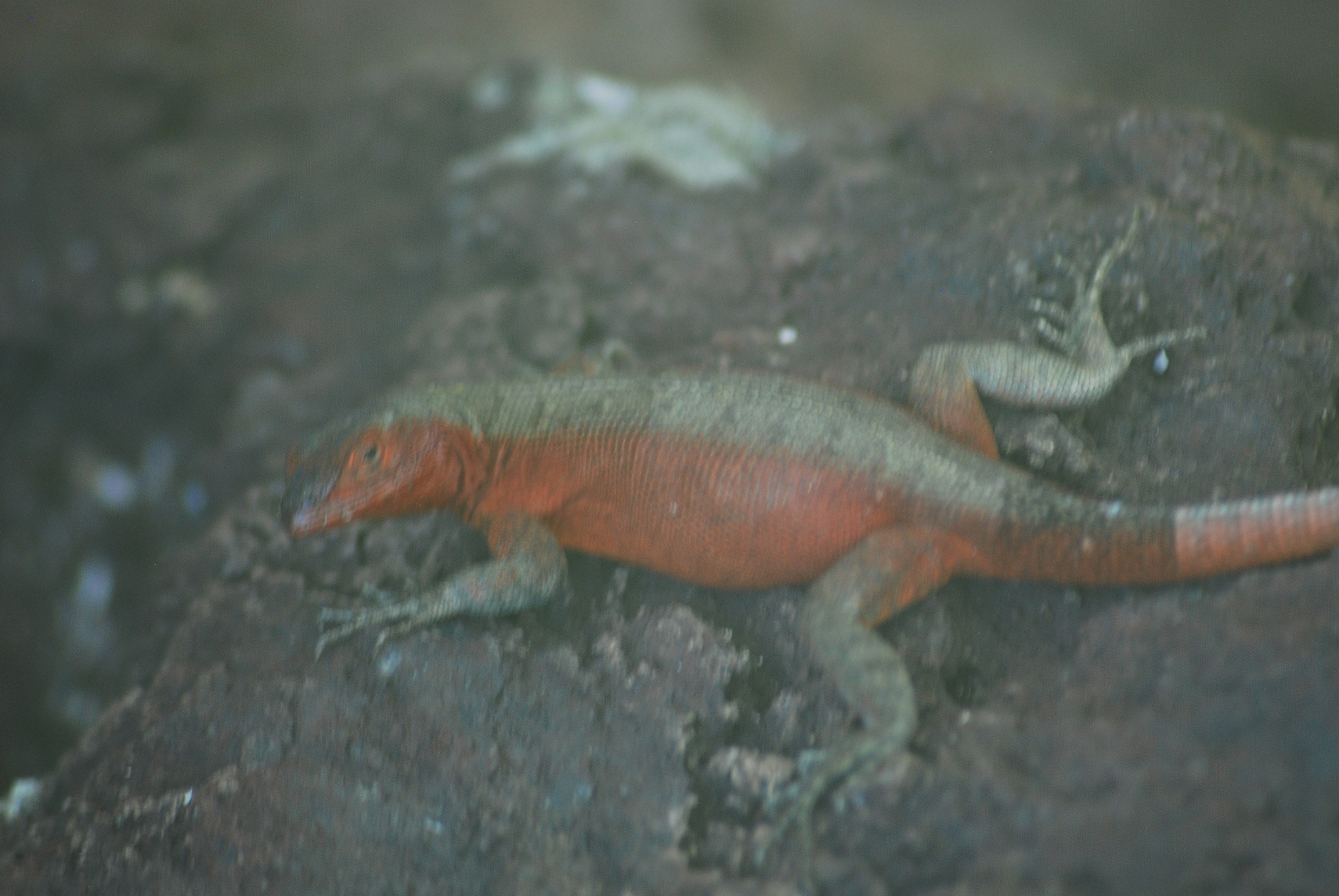

Conservation status
- Near Threatened (IUCN 3.1)

Scientific classification
- Kingdom: Animalia
- Phylum: Chordata
- Class: Reptilia
- Order: Squamata
- Suborder: Iguania
- Family: Tropiduridae
- Genus: Microlophus
- Species: M. duncanensis

Binomial name
- Microlophus duncanensis (Baur, 1890)

Synonyms
- Tropidurus duncanensis Baur, 1890

= Microlophus duncanensis =

Pinzón lava lizard

Species of lizard

Microlophus duncanensis, commonly known as the Pinzón lava lizard, is a species of lava lizard endemic to the Galapagos Island of Pinzón. Although currently classified in the genus Microlophus, it has also been assigned to the genus Tropidurus.
