= Tarapaca Pacific iguana =

Conservation status
- Data Deficient (IUCN 3.1)

Scientific classification
- Kingdom: Animalia
- Phylum: Chordata
- Class: Reptilia
- Order: Squamata
- Suborder: Iguania
- Family: Tropiduridae
- Genus: Microlophus
- Species: M. tarapacensis

Binomial name
- Microlophus tarapacensis (Donoso-Barros, 1966)

Synonyms
- Tropidurus tarapacensis (Donoso-Barros, 1966)

Species of lizard

The Tarapaca Pacific iguana (Microlophus tarapacensis) is a species of lizard in the family Tropiduridae. It is endemic to Chile.
