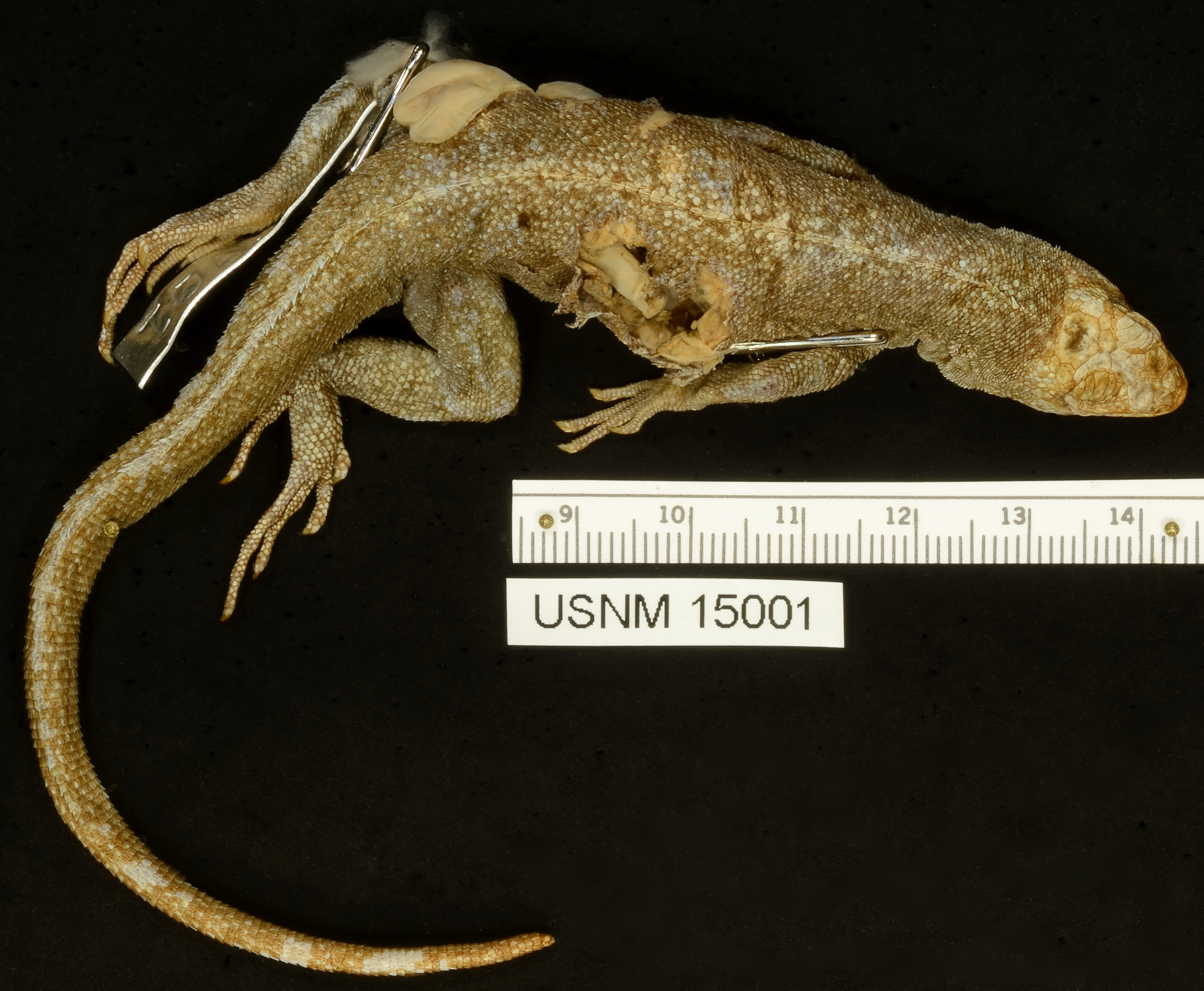

Conservation status
- Least Concern (IUCN 3.1)

Scientific classification
- Kingdom: Animalia
- Phylum: Chordata
- Class: Reptilia
- Order: Squamata
- Suborder: Iguania
- Family: Tropiduridae
- Genus: Microlophus
- Species: M. pacificus

Binomial name
- Microlophus pacificus (Steindachner, 1876)

Synonyms
- Tropidurus (Craniopeltis) pacificus; Leiocephalus pacificus; Tropidurus pacificus; Tropidurus abingdonensis; Tropidurus abingdonii; Tropidurus lemniscatus

= Microlophus pacificus =

Common Pacific iguana

Species of lizard

Microlophus pacificus, the common Pacific iguana, is a species of lava lizard endemic to the Galapagos island of Pinta. The species is commonly attributed to the genus Microlophus but has been attributed to the genus Tropidurus.
