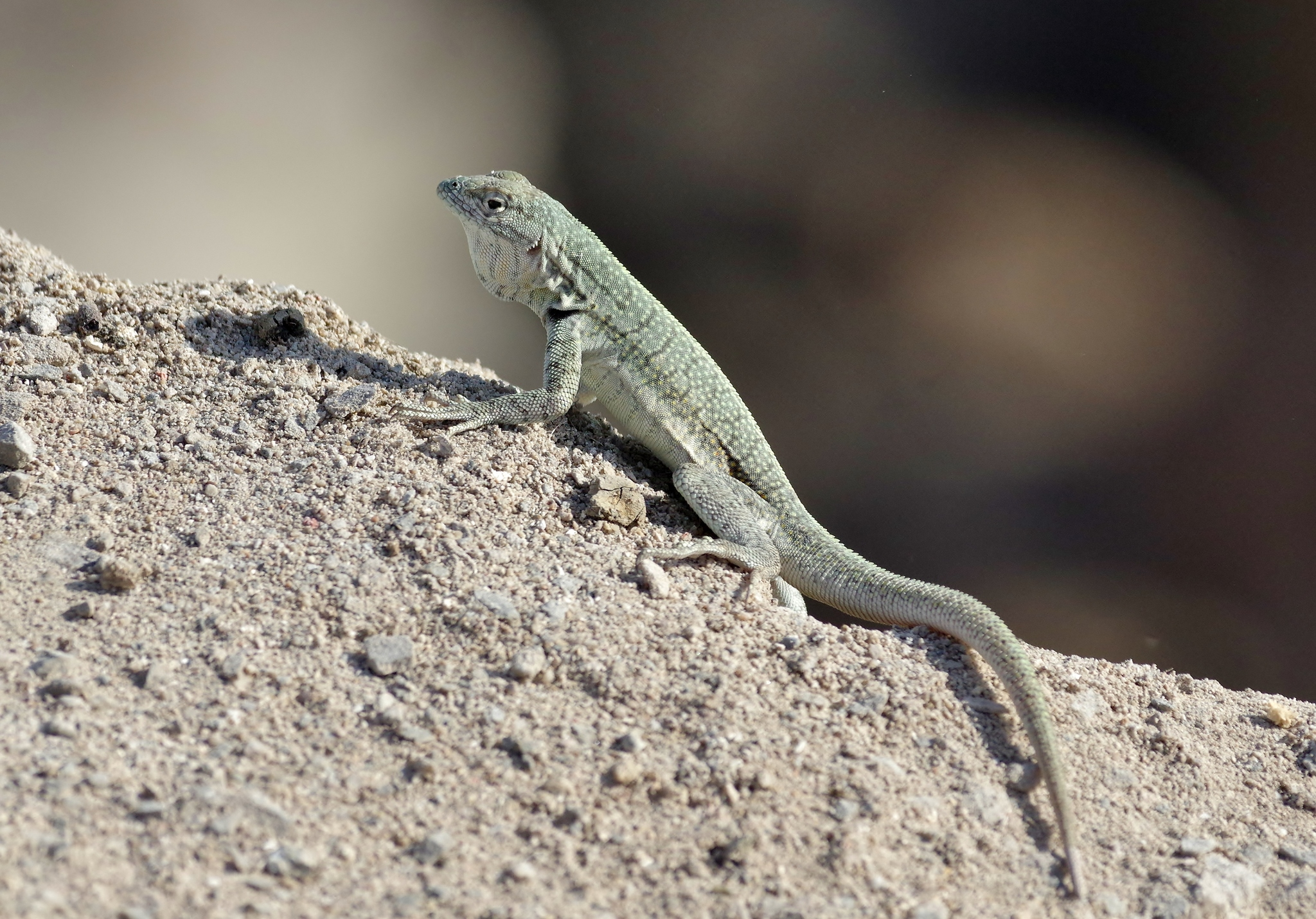

Conservation status
- Least Concern (IUCN 3.1)

Scientific classification
- Kingdom: Animalia
- Phylum: Chordata
- Class: Reptilia
- Order: Squamata
- Suborder: Iguania
- Family: Tropiduridae
- Genus: Microlophus
- Species: M. thoracicus

Binomial name
- Microlophus thoracicus (Tschudi, 1845)

Synonyms
- Steirolepis thoracica - Tschudi, 1845; Tropidurus thomasi - Boulenger, 1900; Tropidurus thoracicus - Henle & Ehrl 1991

= Microlophus thoracicus =

Species of lizard

Microlophus thoracicus, the Tschudi's Pacific iguana, is a species of lava lizard endemic to Peru.
