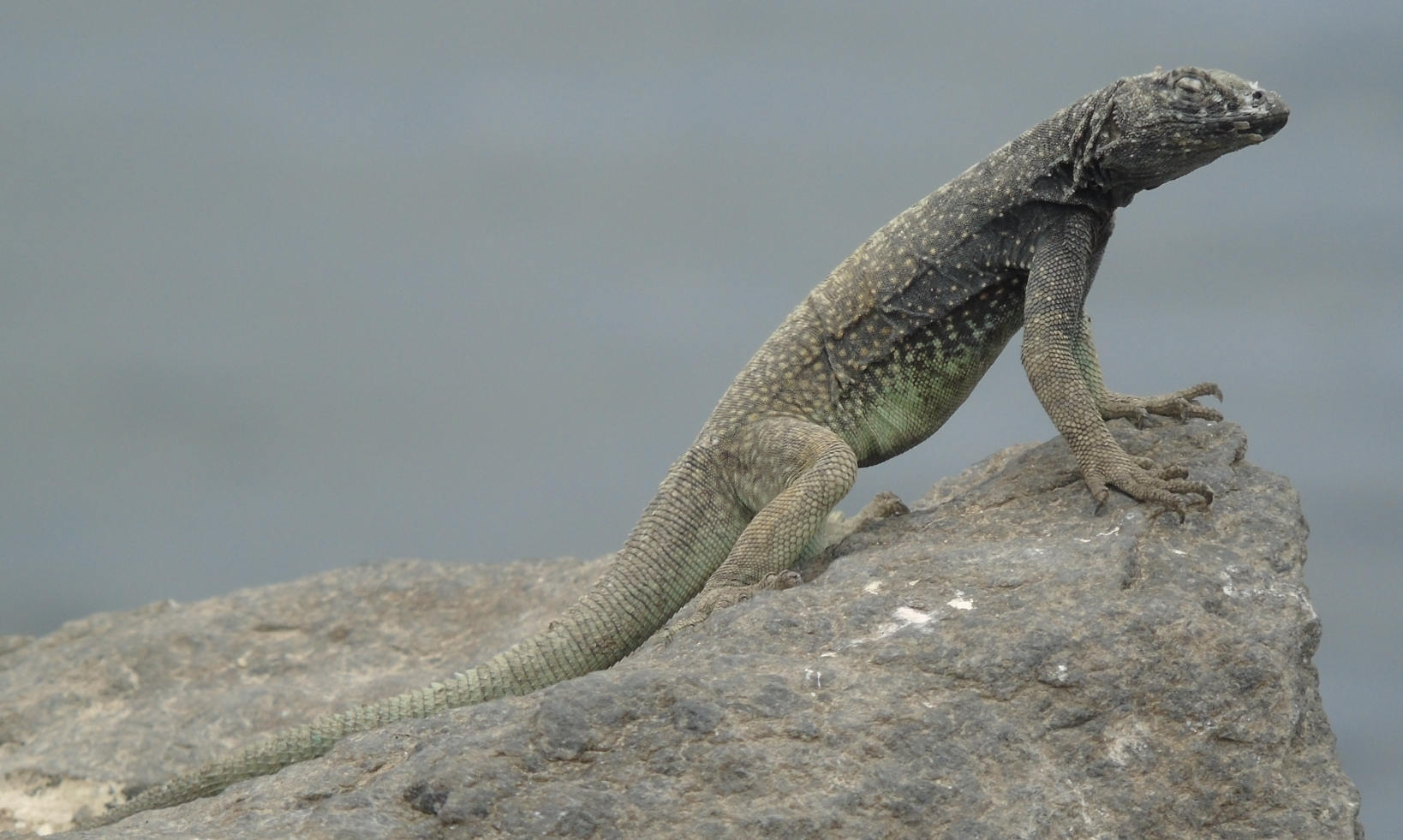

Conservation status
- Least Concern (IUCN 3.1)

Scientific classification
- Kingdom: Animalia
- Phylum: Chordata
- Class: Reptilia
- Order: Squamata
- Suborder: Iguania
- Family: Tropiduridae
- Genus: Microlophus
- Species: M. atacamensis

Binomial name
- Microlophus atacamensis (Donoso-Barros, 1960)

Synonyms
- Tropidurus peruvianus atacamensis Donoso-Barros, 1960; Tropidurus peruvianus marianus Donoso-Barros, 1966; Tropidurus atacamensis Ortiz-Zapata, 1980

= Microlophus atacamensis =

Atacamen Pacific iguana

Species of lizard

Microlophus atacamensis, the Atacamen Pacific iguana, is a species of lava lizard that is endemic to Chile.

== Behavioral and ecology ==
Survival characteristics, such as thermoregulation and migration, are purely based on behavior for Microlophus atacamensis. Being an omnivorous creature, it has the choice to eat both plants and animals that inhabit northern Chile. Depending on the specific population of Microlophus atacamensis, it can reside in the most northern region of northern Chile and depend more on algae for its diet instead of Diptera (fruit flies), as they would in most of the southern region of northern Chile. They abundantly occupy a large coastal area, and can be easily sampled

Thermoregulation levels also suggest behavioral patterns since M. atacamensis not only bask in the sun to retain heat, but they also change their body shape or orientate their body plane perpendicular to the sun. Hence proving that M. atacamensis can make behavioral adjustments to increase heating rates.
