= Microlophus heterolepis =

Conservation status
- Data Deficient (IUCN 3.1)

Scientific classification
- Kingdom: Animalia
- Phylum: Chordata
- Class: Reptilia
- Order: Squamata
- Suborder: Iguania
- Family: Tropiduridae
- Genus: Microlophus
- Species: M. heterolepis

Binomial name
- Microlophus heterolepis (Weigmann, 1834)

Synonyms
- Tropidurus heterolepis - Wiegmann, 1834; Steirolepis heterolepis - Fitzinger, 1843; Tropidurus (Microlophus) heterolepis - Peters, 1871; Tropidurus peruvianus heterolepis - Dononso-Barros, 1966

Species of lizard

The Microlophus heterolepis is a species of lava lizard endemic to Chile and Peru.
