= Microlophus habelii =

Conservation status
- Least Concern (IUCN 3.1)

Scientific classification
- Kingdom: Animalia
- Phylum: Chordata
- Class: Reptilia
- Order: Squamata
- Suborder: Iguania
- Family: Tropiduridae
- Genus: Microlophus
- Species: M. habelii

Binomial name
- Microlophus habelii (Steindachner, 1876)
- Geographic range of Microlophus habelii in the Galapagos Islands

Synonyms
- Tropidurus (Craniopeltis) habelii Steindachner, 1876; Tropidurus habelii — Van Denburgh & Slevin, 1913; Microlophus habelii — Frost, 1992; Tropidurus pacificus habelii — Tiedemann, Häupl & Grillitsch, 1994; Microlophus habelii — Swash & Still, 2000

Species of lizard

Microlophus habelii, commonly known as the Marchena lava lizard, is a species of lizard in the family Tropiduridae. The species is endemic to the Galapagos island of Marchena.

== Etymology ==
The specific name, habelii, is in honor of German-American naturalist Simeon Habel.

== Habitat ==
Microlophus habelii is found in a variety of habitats: naked rock, grassland, and shrubland, at altitudes from sea level to 343 m (1,125 ft).

== Reproduction ==
Microlophus habelii is oviparous.

== Taxonomy ==
Microlophus habelii is commonly assigned to the genus Microlophus but has also been assigned to the genus Tropidurus, in which it was originally described.
