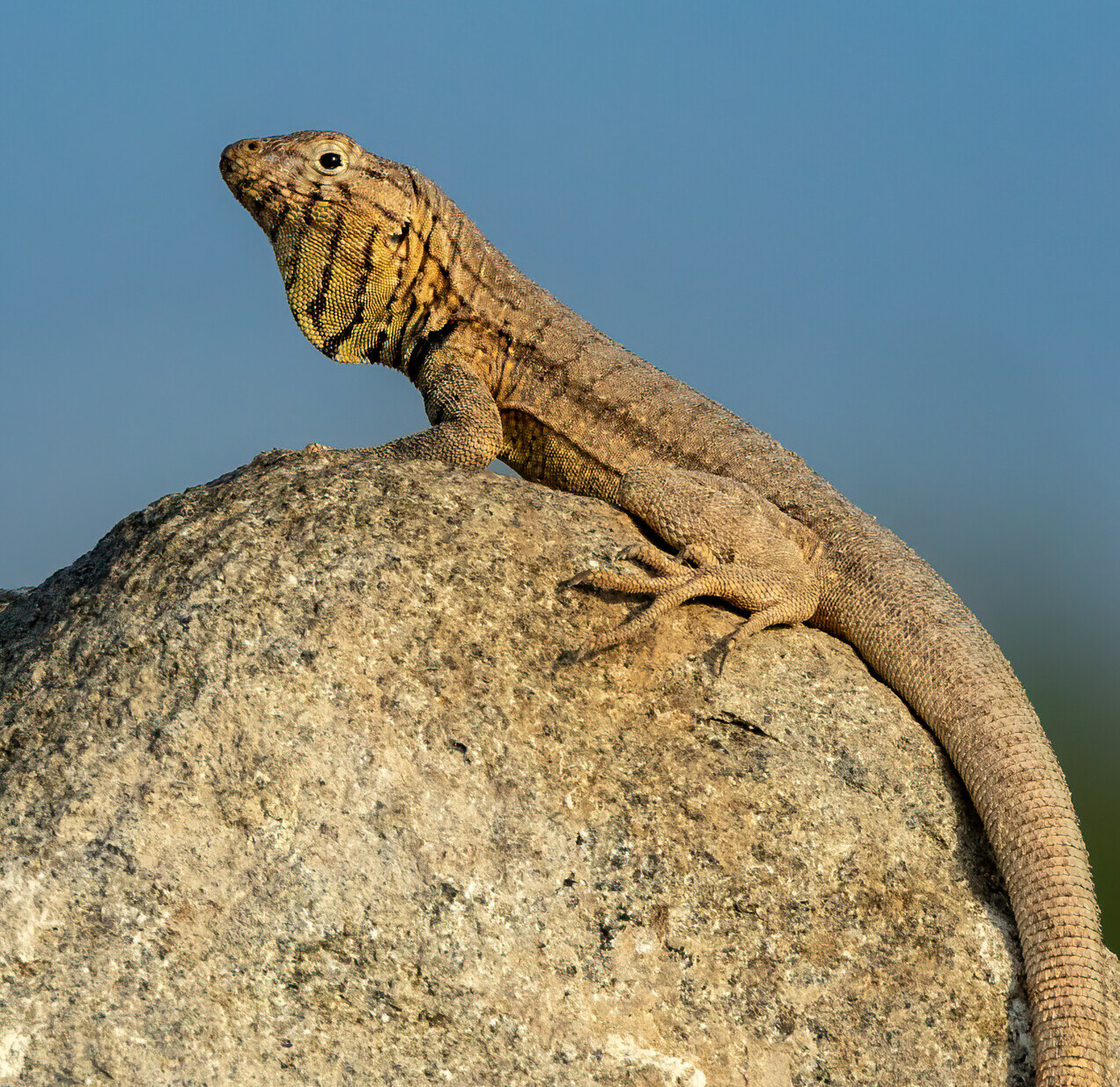

Conservation status
- Least Concern (IUCN 3.1)

Scientific classification
- Kingdom: Animalia
- Phylum: Chordata
- Class: Reptilia
- Order: Squamata
- Suborder: Iguania
- Family: Tropiduridae
- Genus: Microlophus
- Species: M. yanezi

Binomial name
- Microlophus yanezi (Ortiz-Zapata, 1980)

Synonyms
- Tropidurus yanezi Ortiz-Zapata, 1980; Microlophus yanezi — Frost, 1992

= Microlophus yanezi =

Species of plant

Microlophus yanezi, commonly called Yanez's lava lizard, is a species of lizard in the family Tropiduridae. The species is endemic to the Chilean Matorral within the nation of Chile.

== Etymology ==
The specific name, yanezi, is in honor of Chilean zoologist José Lautaro Yáñez-Valenzuela (born 1951).

== Habitat ==
The preferred natural habitat of M. yanezi is desert, at altitudes from sea level to 2,800 m (9,200 ft).

== Reproduction ==
M. yanezi is oviparous.
