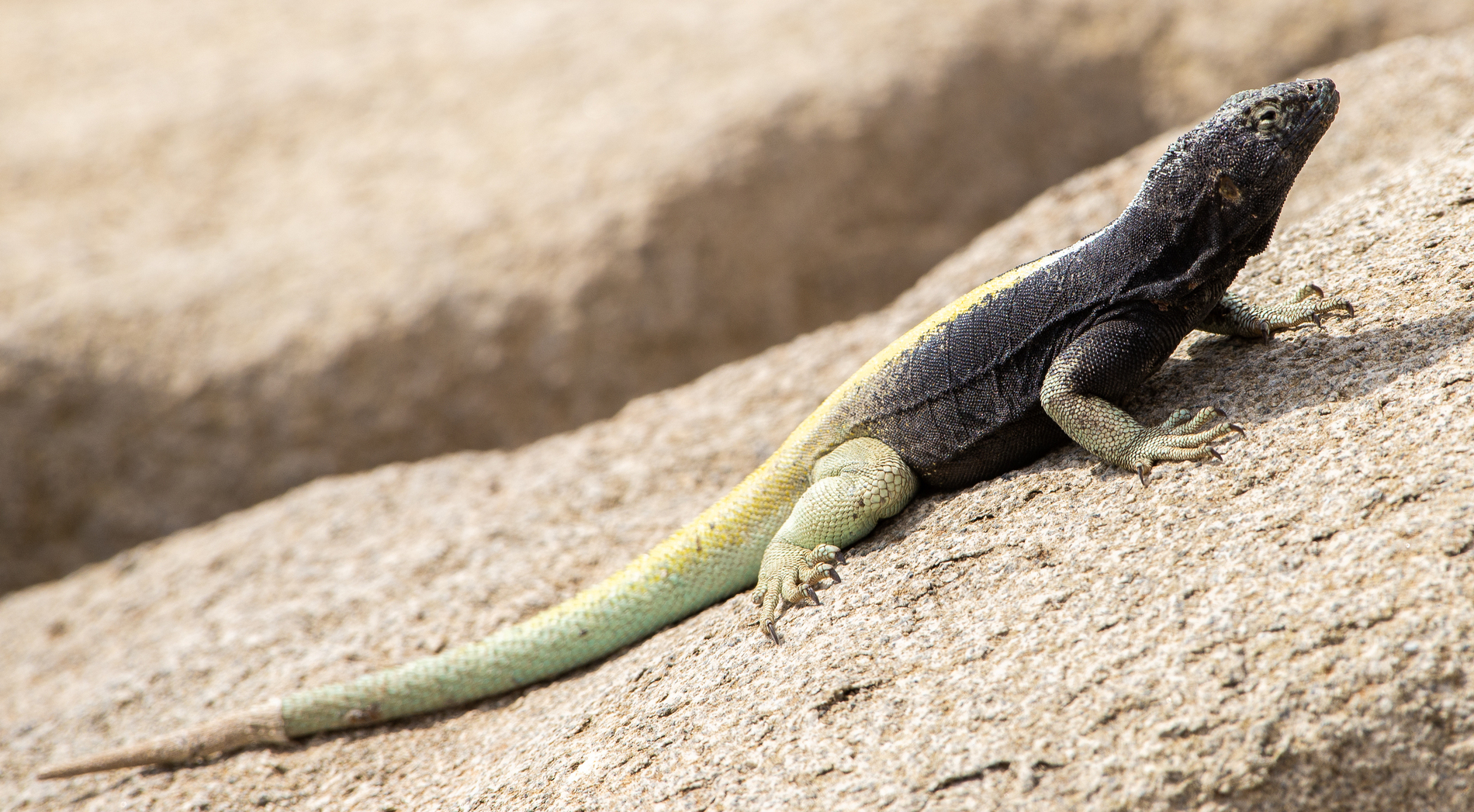
- Male
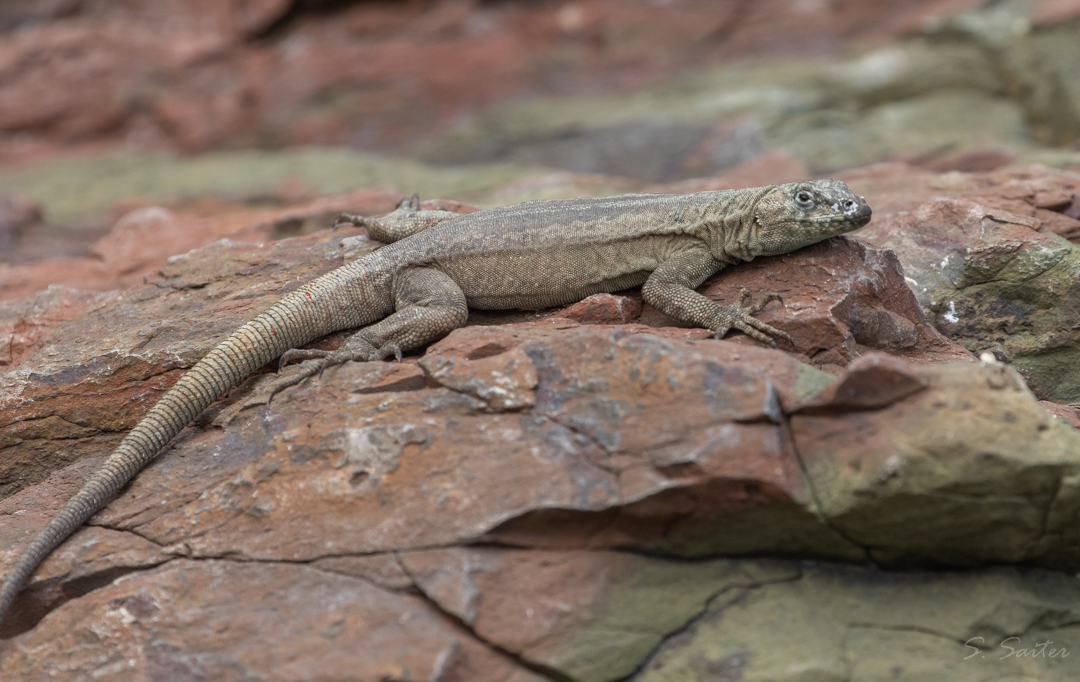
- Female

Conservation status
- Least Concern (IUCN 3.1)

Scientific classification
- Kingdom: Animalia
- Phylum: Chordata
- Class: Reptilia
- Order: Squamata
- Suborder: Iguania
- Family: Tropiduridae
- Genus: Microlophus
- Species: M. quadrivittatus

Binomial name
- Microlophus quadrivittatus (Tschudi, 1845)

Synonyms
- Steirolepis quadrivittata Tschudi, 1845

= Microlophus quadrivittatus =

Four-banded Pacific iguana

Species of lizard

Microlophus quadrivittatus, the four-banded Pacific iguana, is a species of lava lizard found in the Pacific coast of Peru and Chile.

== Gallery ==
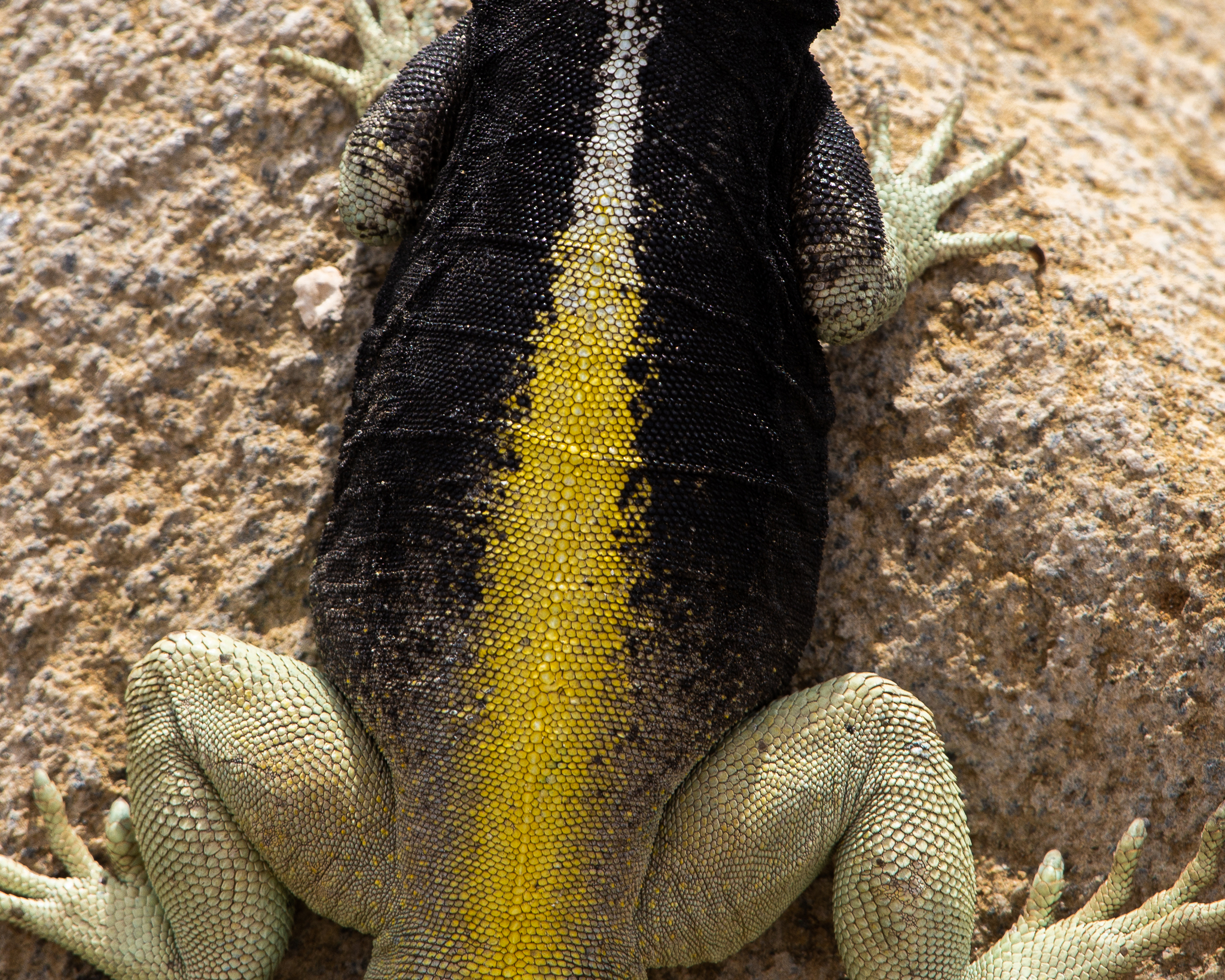
Male dorsal view

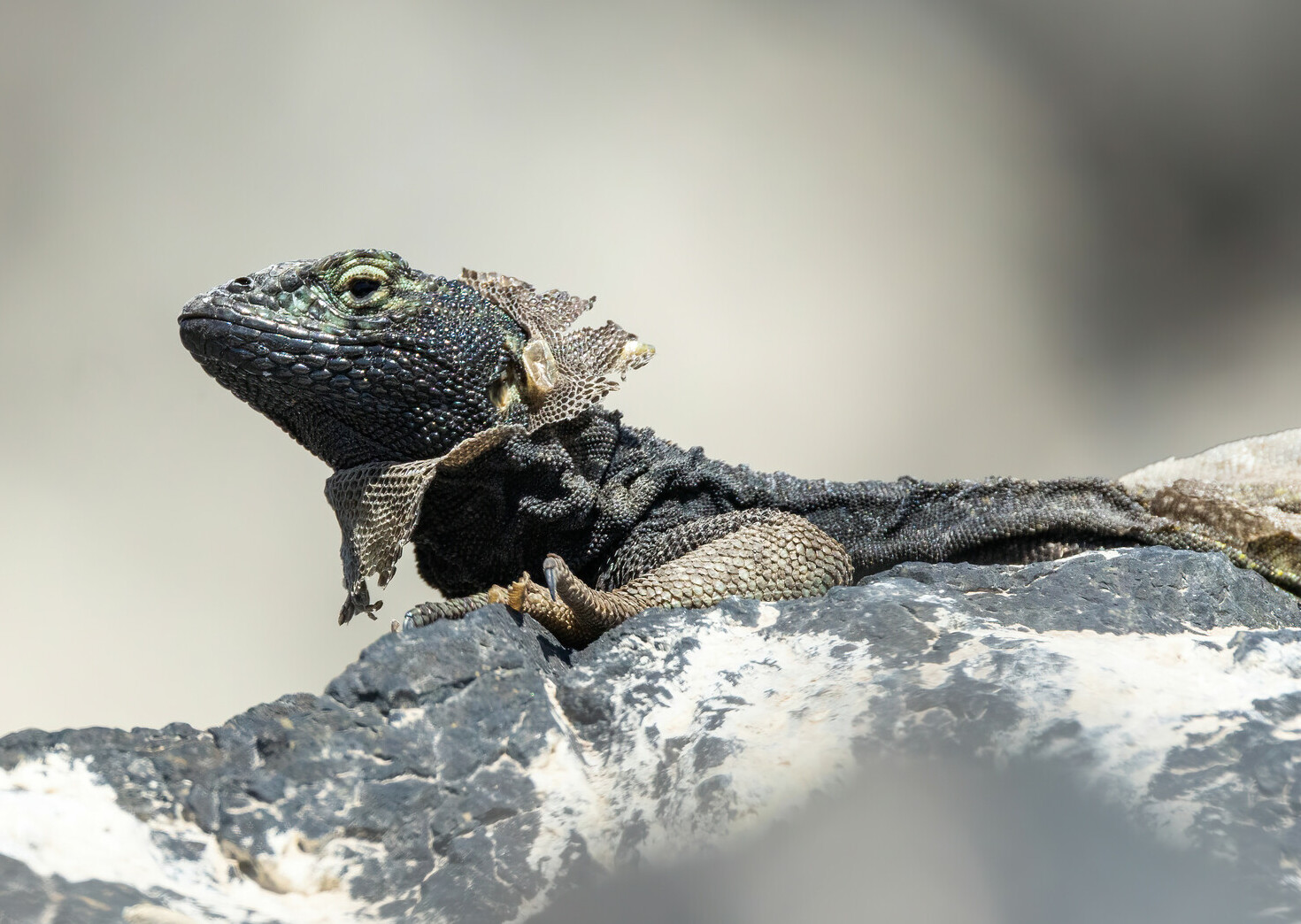
Male shedding

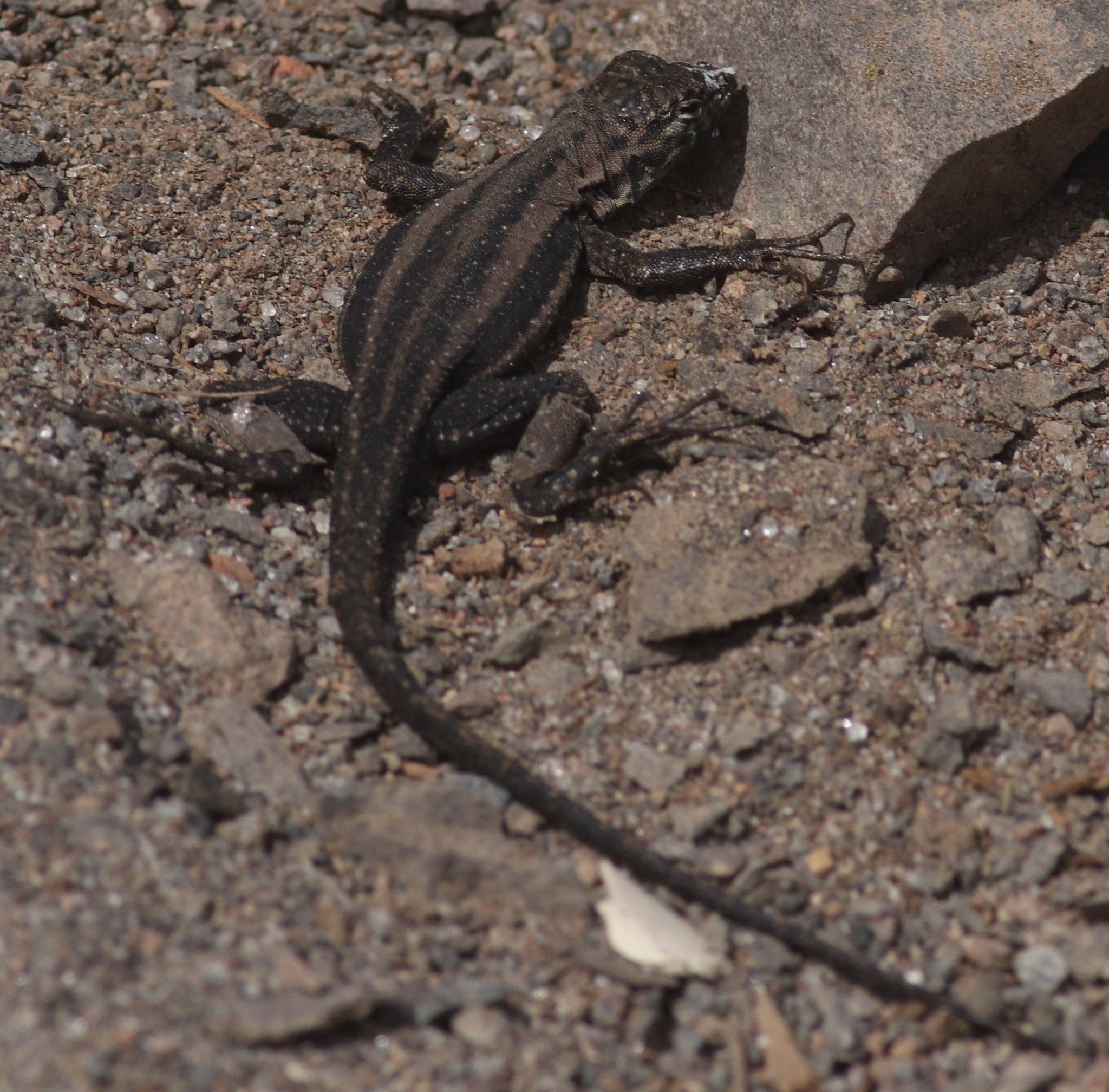
Juvenile
