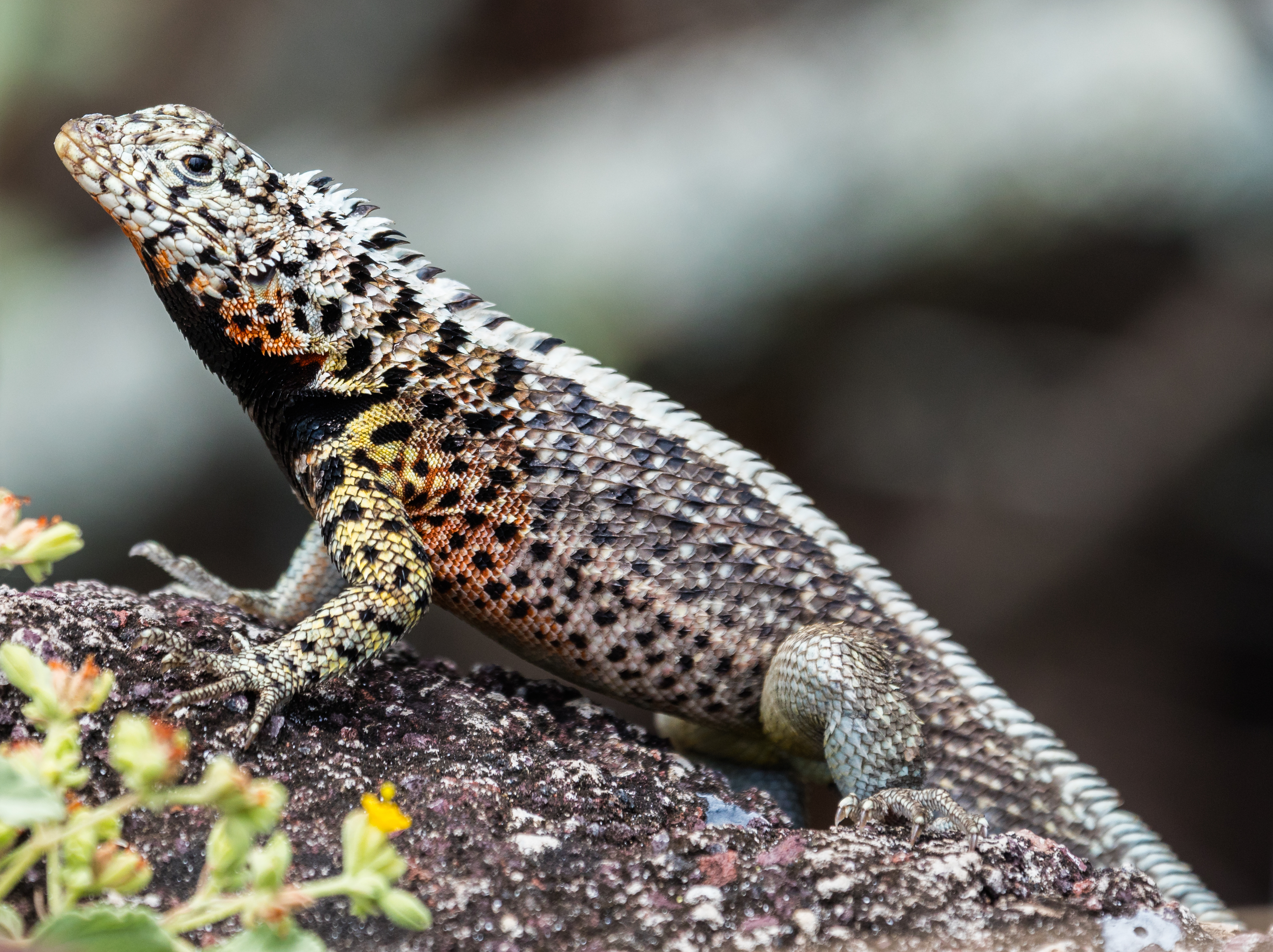
- Male
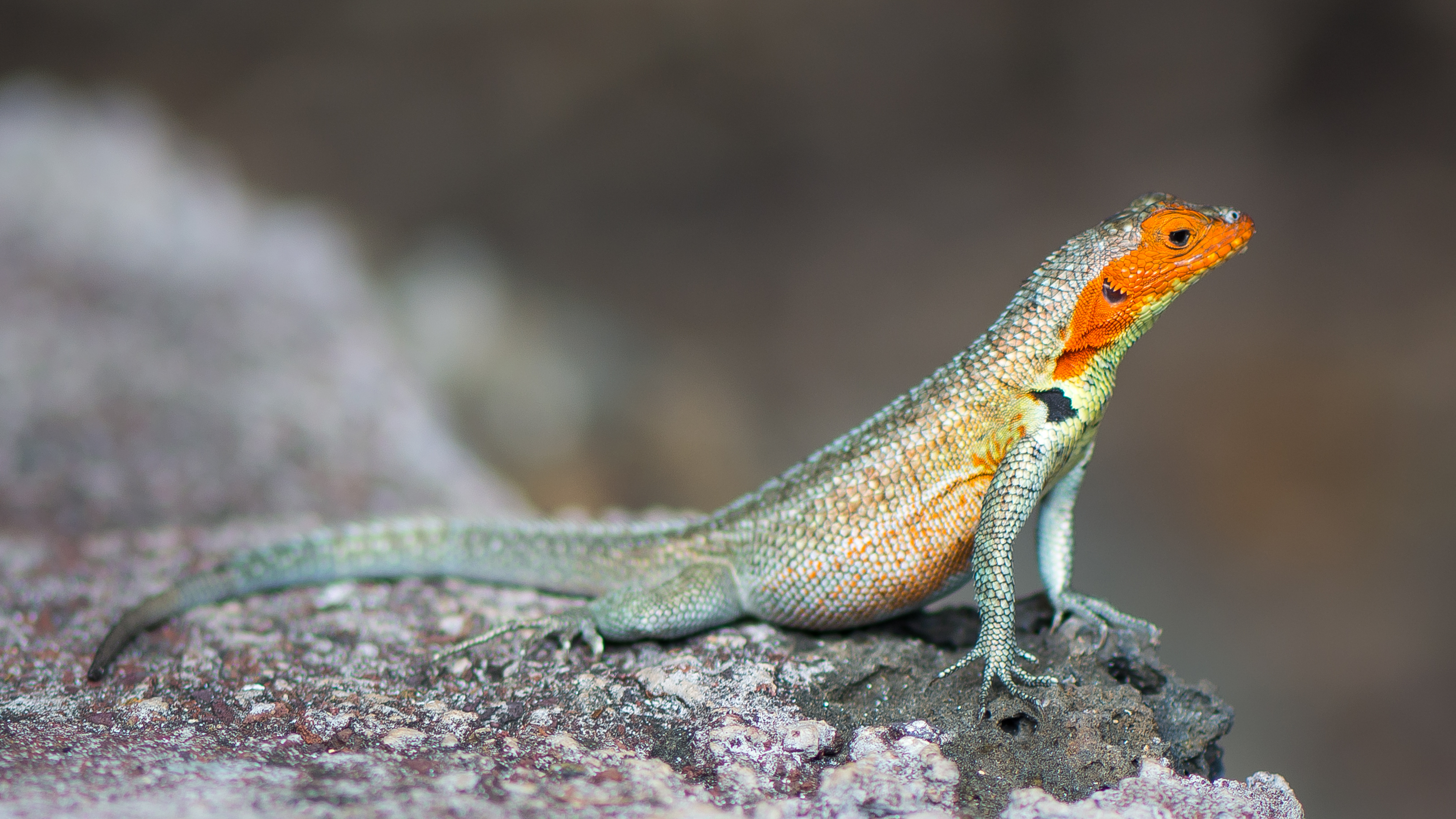
- Female

Conservation status
- Least Concern (IUCN 3.1)

Scientific classification
- Kingdom: Animalia
- Phylum: Chordata
- Class: Reptilia
- Order: Squamata
- Suborder: Iguania
- Family: Tropiduridae
- Genus: Microlophus
- Species: M. indefatigabilis

Binomial name
- Microlophus indefatigabilis (Baur, 1890)

Synonyms
- Tropidurus indefatigabilis

= Microlophus indefatigabilis =

Santa Cruz lava lizard

Species of lizard

The Santa Cruz lava lizard (Microlophus indefatigabilis) is a species of lava lizard endemic to the Galapagos island of Santa Cruz.

== Distribution ==
Endemic to Santa Cruz Island, it is found within volcanic rock areas, dry shrublands, dry grasslands, deciduous forests, and urban areas, and prefers shaded locations.

== Description ==
They are identifiable by a brown body with scattered black and white blotches with a distinctive red and black throat and a black chest. Females have a more uniform brown body, a bright orange face, and a black mark at shoulder level. The species is able to shed its tail without mortal injury.

=== Sexual dimorphism ===
Harems are kept, and are competed for by males using a pushup ritual to avoid physical injury. Males have a higher stamina and greater body size compared to the female.
