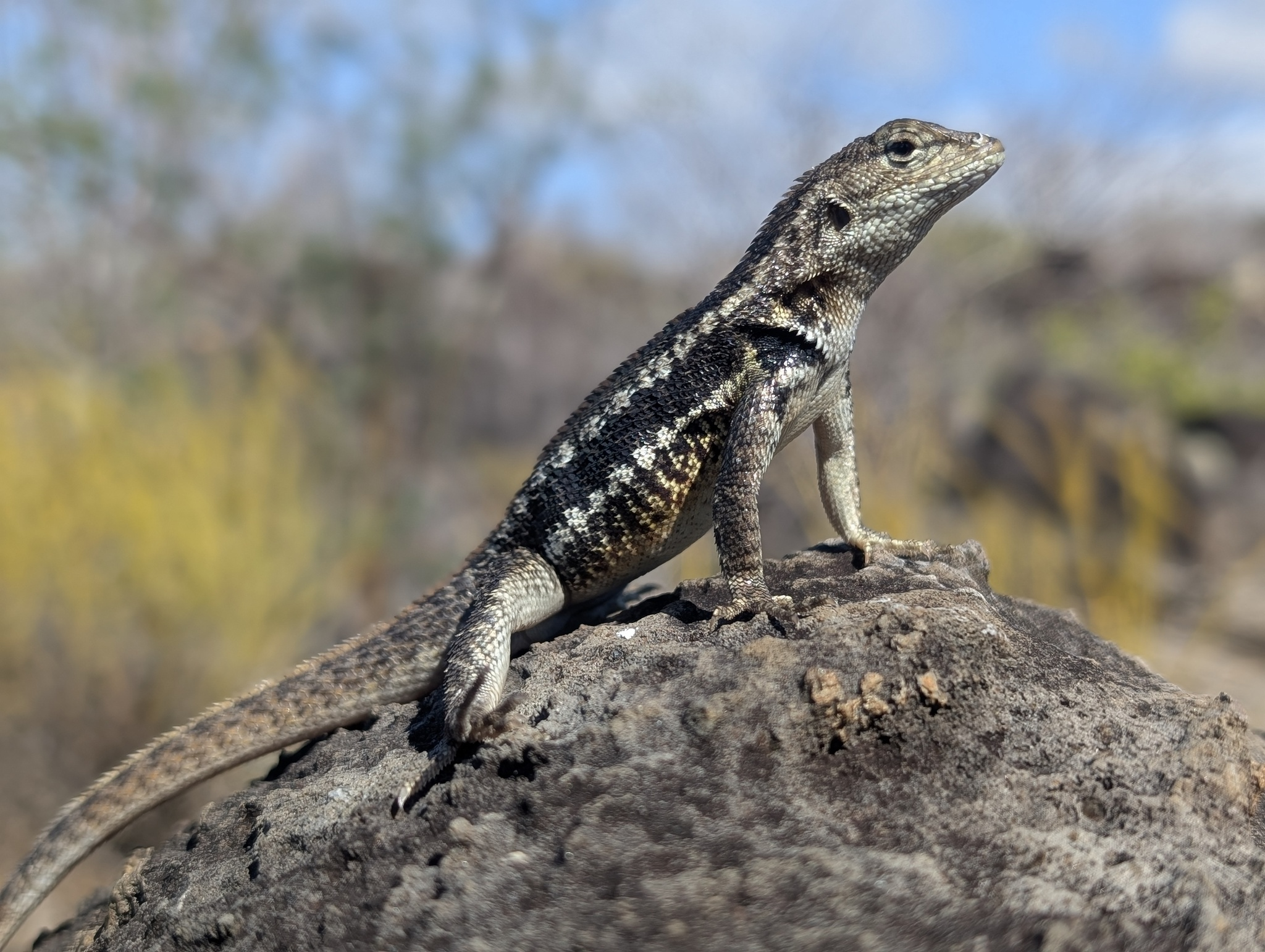
- Male
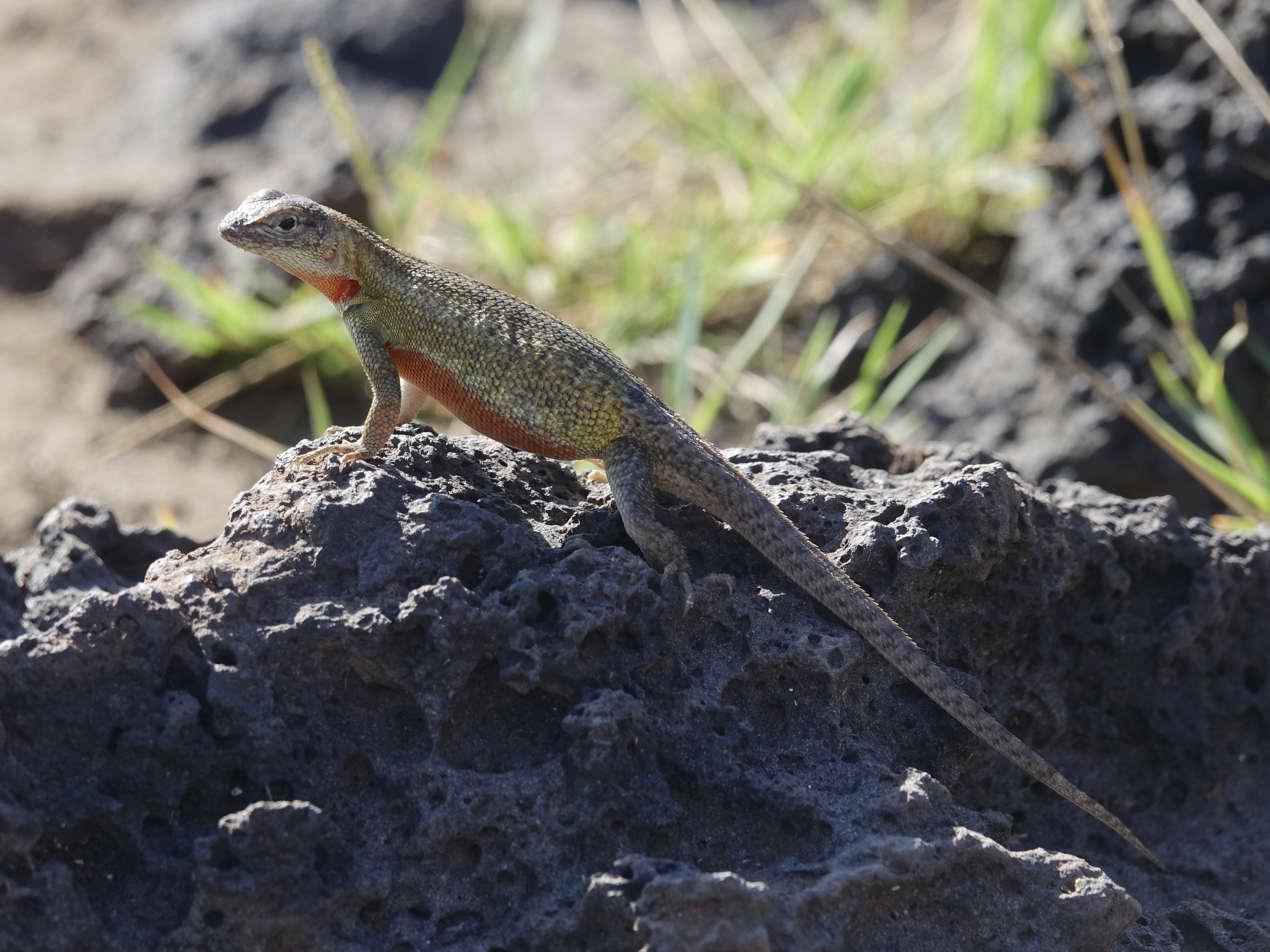
- Female

Conservation status
- Near Threatened (IUCN 3.1)

Scientific classification
- Kingdom: Animalia
- Phylum: Chordata
- Class: Reptilia
- Order: Squamata
- Suborder: Iguania
- Family: Tropiduridae
- Genus: Microlophus
- Species: M. bivittatus

Binomial name
- Microlophus bivittatus (Peters, 1871)

Synonyms
- Tropidurus (Craniopeltis) bivittata Peters, 1871; Tropidurus lemniscatus Cope, 1889; Tropidurus bivittatus — van Denburgh & Slevin, 1913; Microlophus bivittatus – Frost, 1992

= Microlophus bivittatus =

San Cristóbal lava lizard

Species of lizard

Microlophus bivittatus, the San Cristóbal lava lizard, is a species of lava lizard endemic to San Cristóbal Island in the Galápagos Islands. The species is commonly attributed to the genus Microlophus but has been attributed to the genus Tropidurus. They are currently under threat by invasive cats on the island. The lizard is also closely related to the Microlophus occipitalis which radiated off of the bivittatus.

== Reproduction ==
Lava lizards have a breeding ritual where males will compete via head bobbing to avoid physical conflict. Research has found that head bobbing achieves a greater response when the response is immediate as compared to a 30-second delay. Larger males will receive greater aggression from other males and greater assertive responses from females. There is no current data that supports ecological competition is higher between same sex individuals however.

== Gallery ==
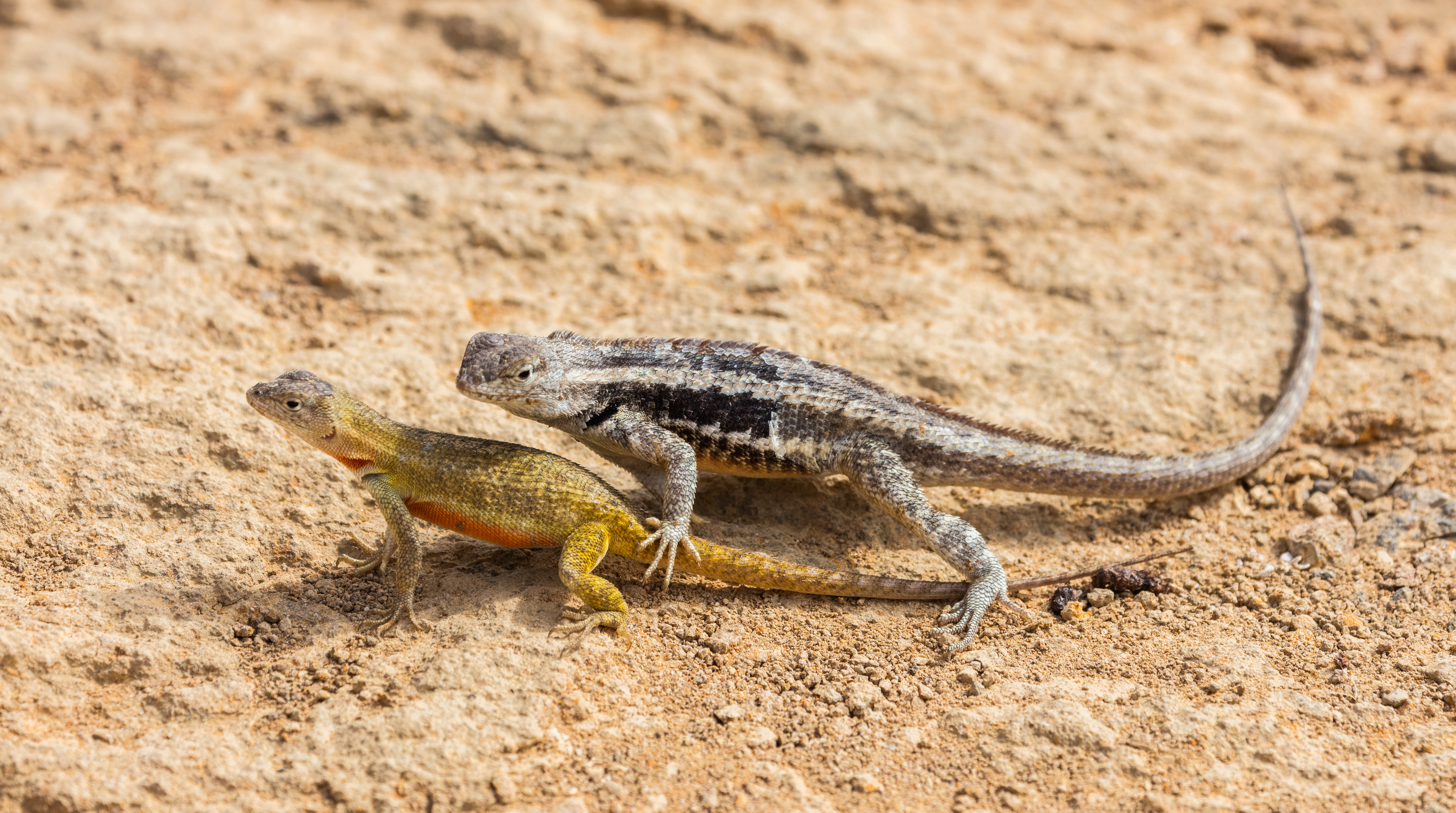
Male and female comparison

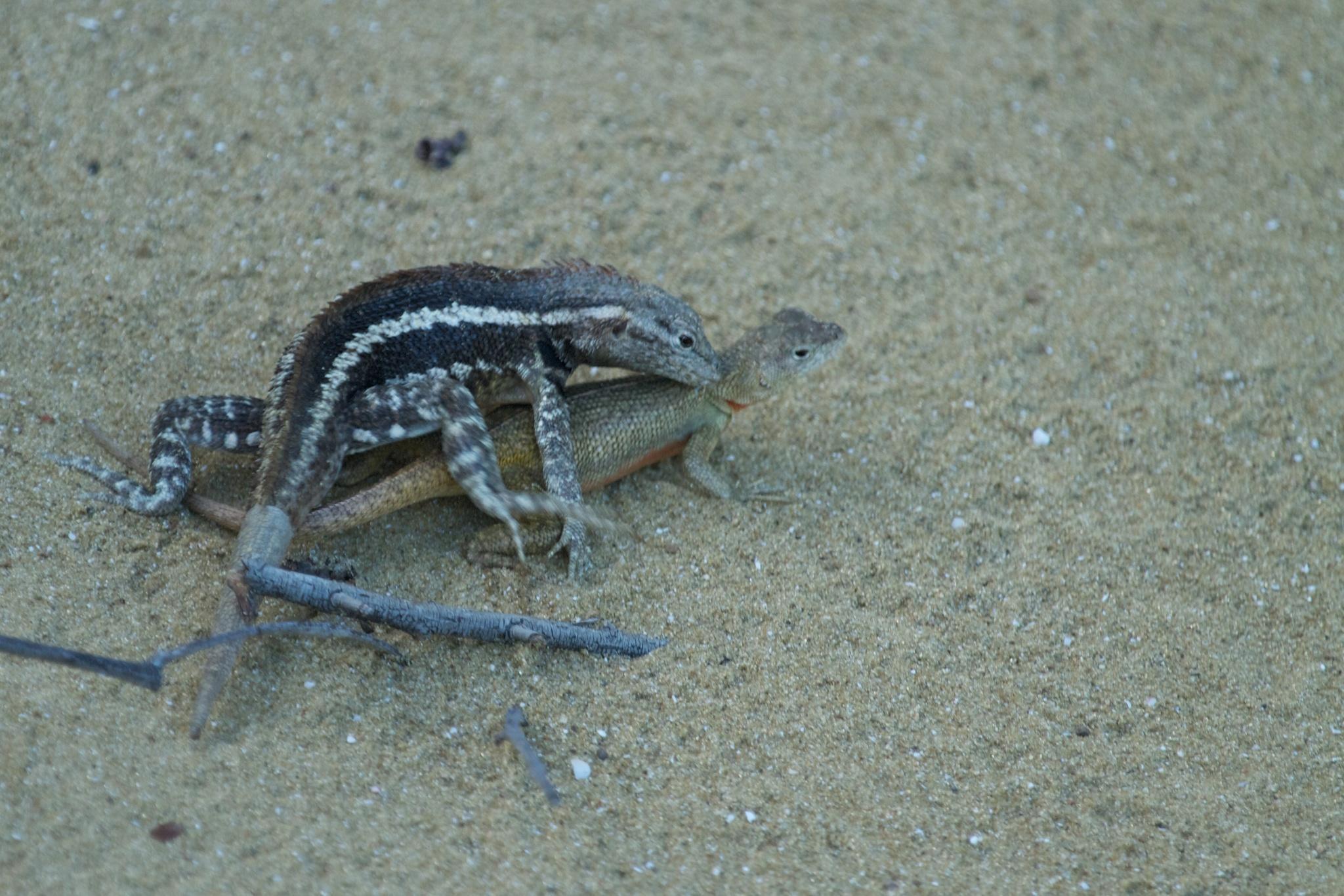
Mating

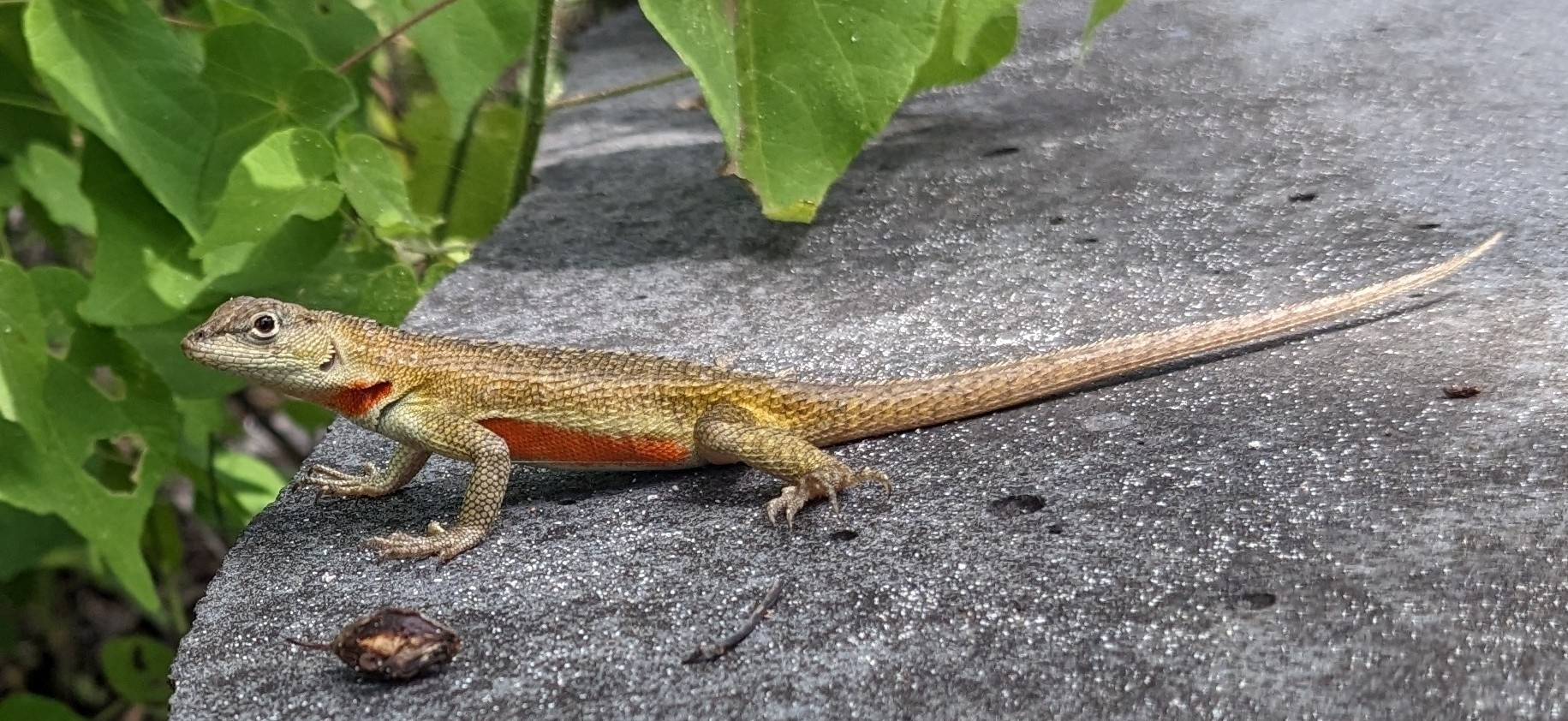
Female

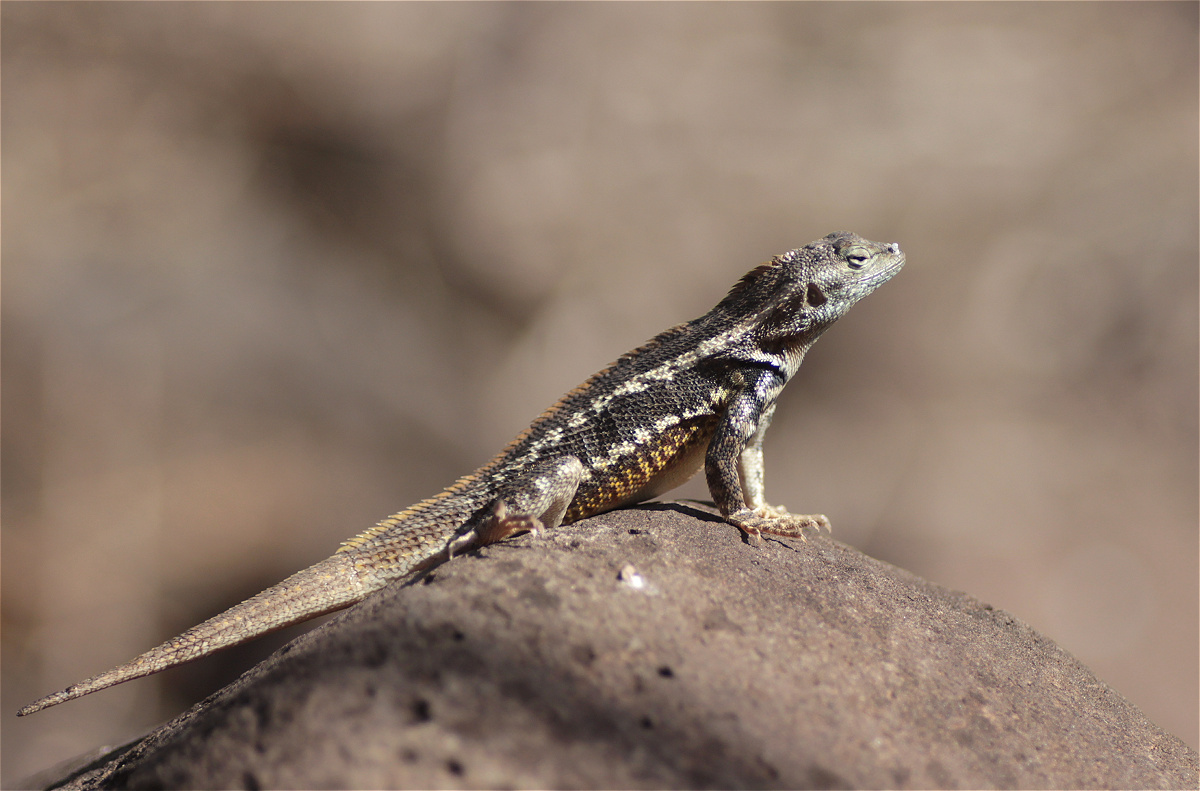
Male with regrown tail

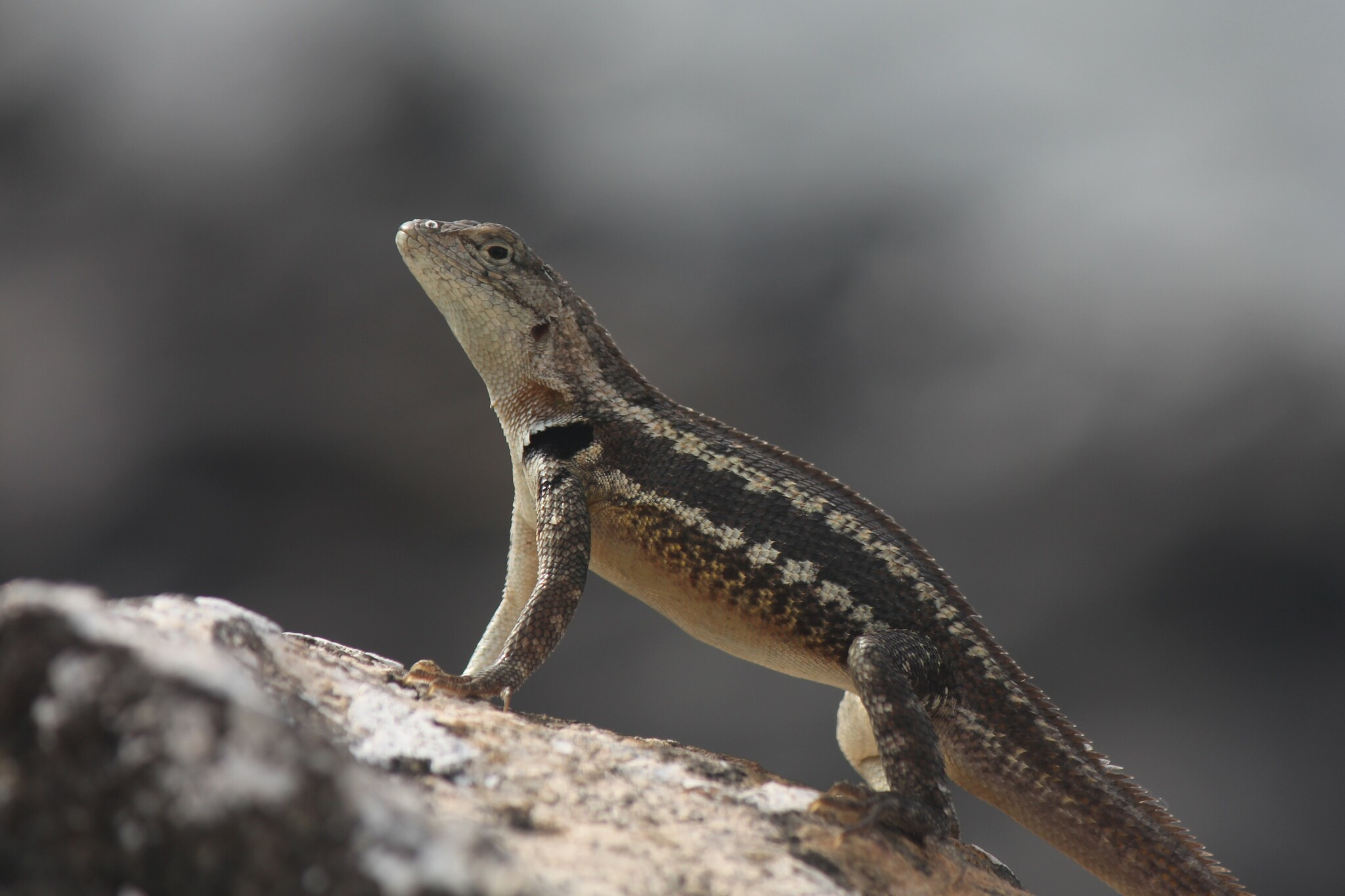
