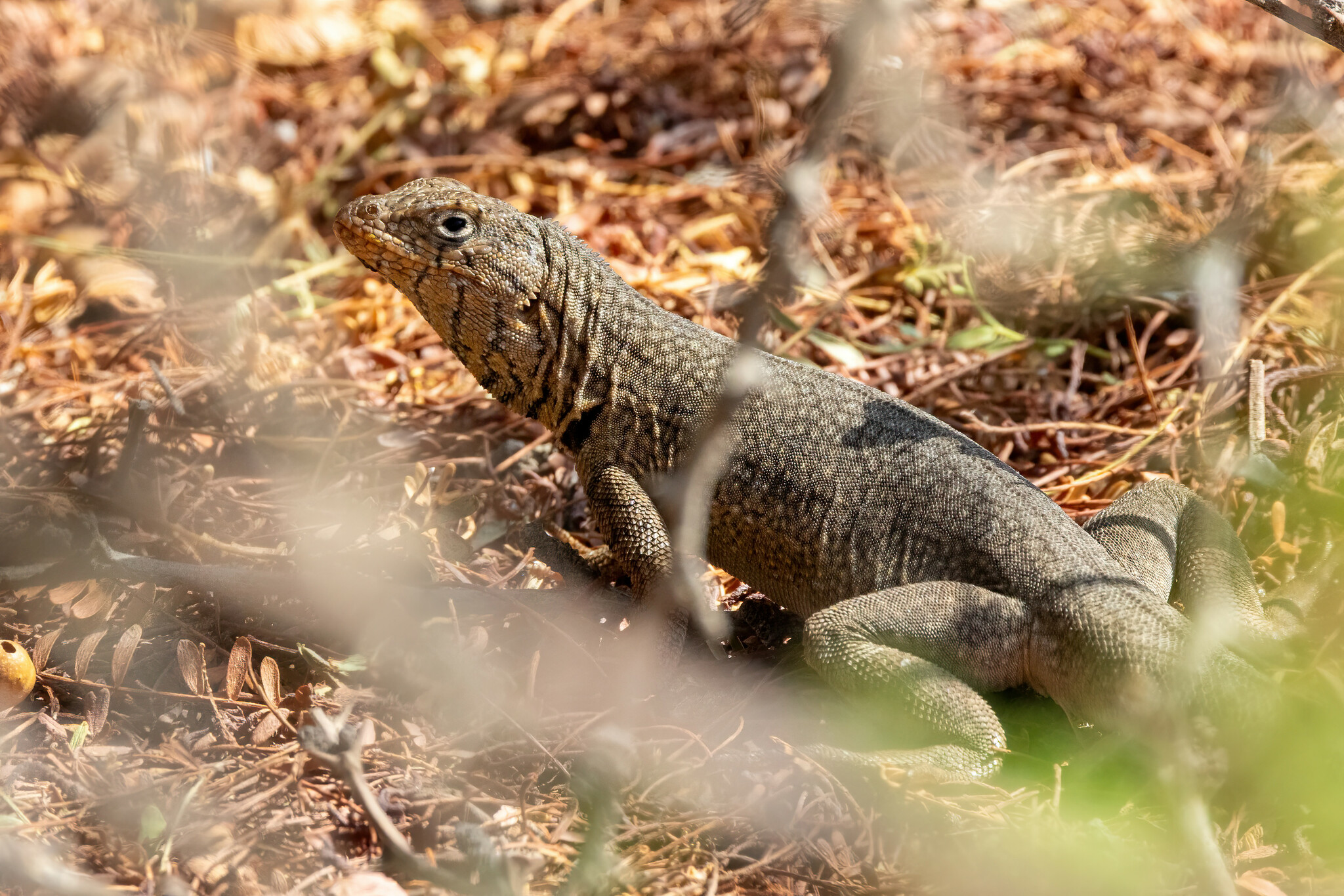

Conservation status
- Least Concern (IUCN 3.1)

Scientific classification
- Kingdom: Animalia
- Phylum: Chordata
- Class: Reptilia
- Order: Squamata
- Suborder: Iguania
- Family: Tropiduridae
- Genus: Microlophus
- Species: M. theresioides

Binomial name
- Microlophus theresioides (Donoso-Barros, 1966)

Synonyms
- Tropidurus theresioides Donoso-Barros, 1966; Tropidurus peruvianus maminensis Donoso-Barros, 1966; Tropidurus theresioide Peters et al., 1970

= Microlophus theresioides =

Species of lizard

The Microlophus theresioides (common name in Spanish is Corredor de Pica) is a species of lava lizard endemic to Chile.
