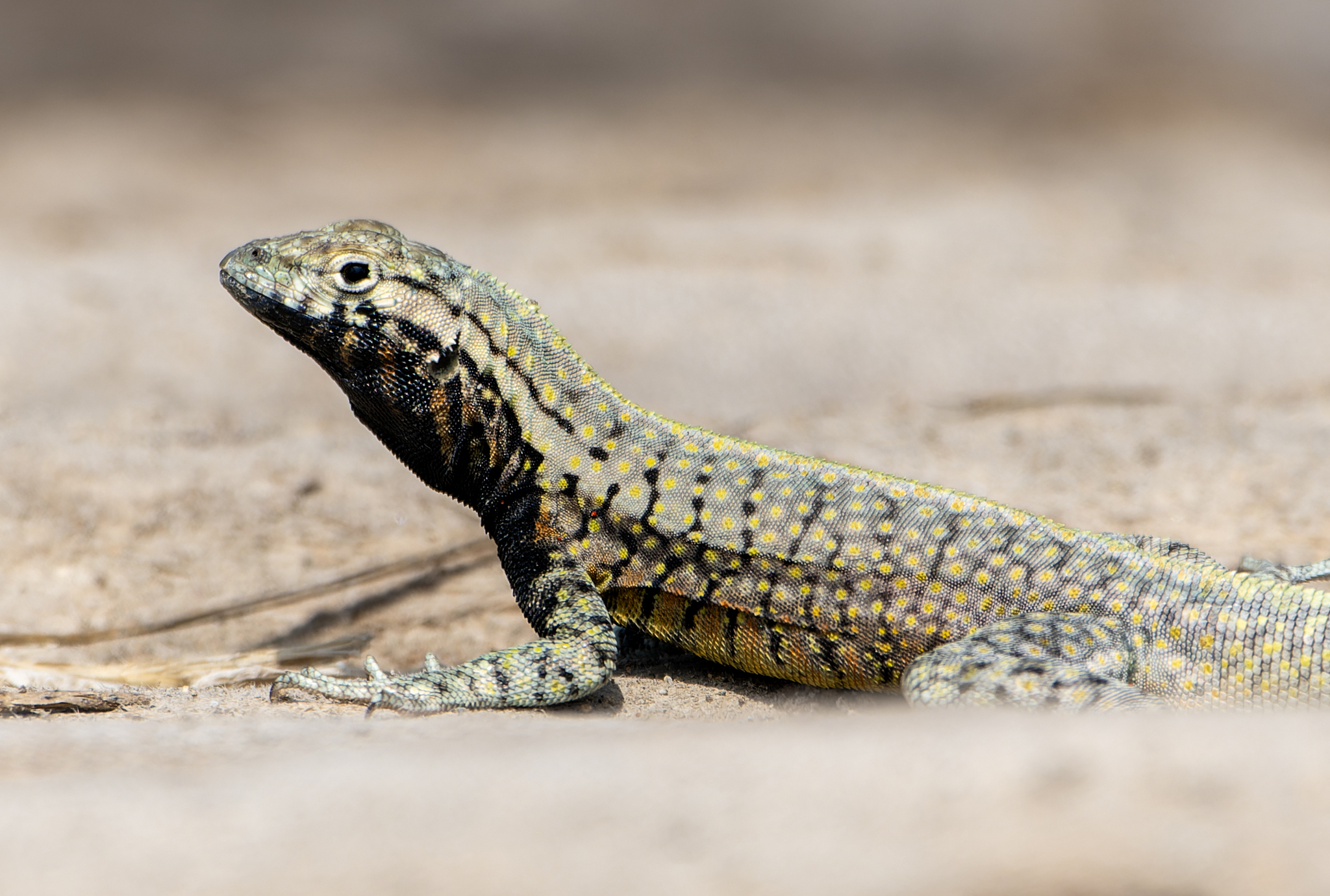
- Male
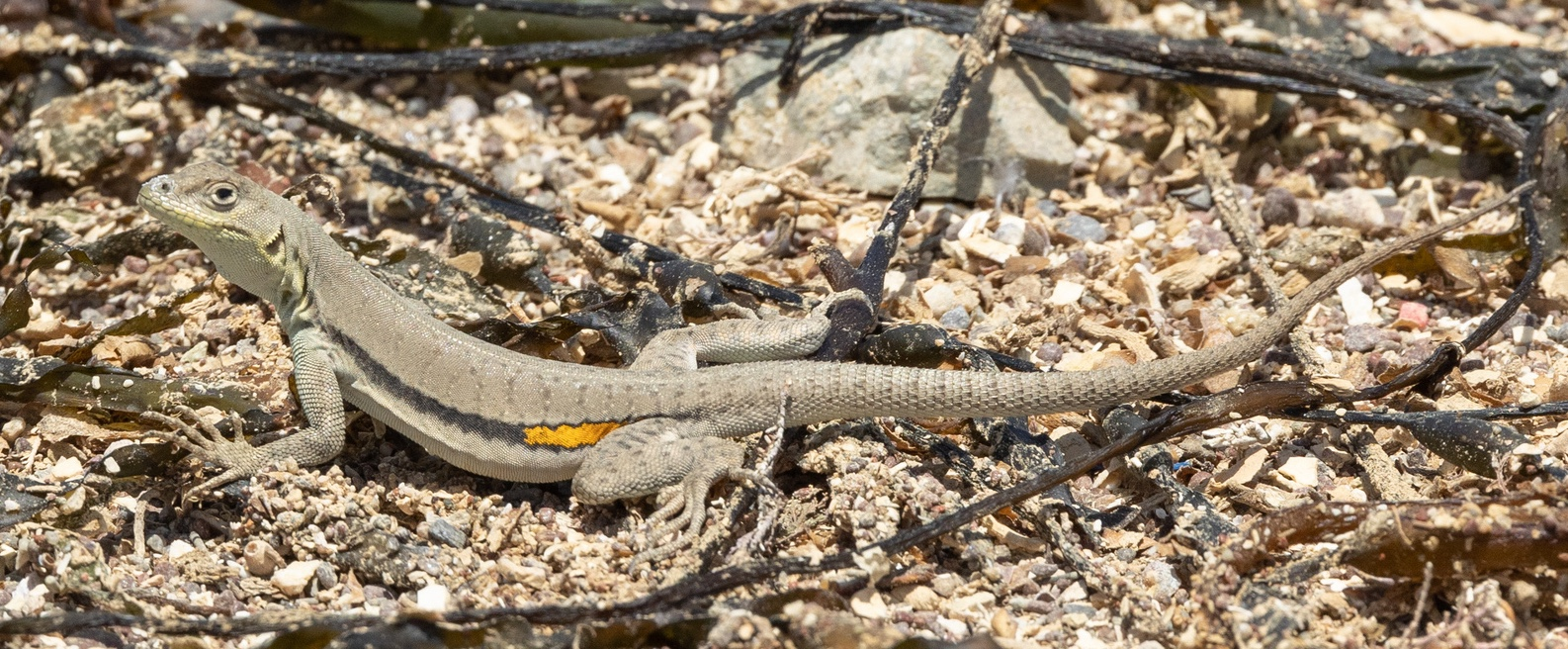
- Female

Conservation status
- Least Concern (IUCN 3.1)

Scientific classification
- Kingdom: Animalia
- Phylum: Chordata
- Class: Reptilia
- Order: Squamata
- Suborder: Iguania
- Family: Tropiduridae
- Genus: Microlophus
- Species: M. peruvianus

Binomial name
- Microlophus peruvianus (Lesson, 1830)

Subspecies
- M. p. salinicola (Mertens, 1956); M. p. peruvianus (Lesson, 1830)

Synonyms
- Stellio peruvianus; Lophyrus araucanus; Tropidurus microlophus; Microlophus Lessoni; Steirolepis microlophus; Steirolepis peruviana; Steirolepis xanthostigma; Microlophus inguinalis

= Microlophus peruvianus =

Species of lizard

Microlophus peruvianus, the Peru Pacific iguana, is a species of lava lizard endemic to the Ecuador, Peru, and Chile. The species is commonly attributed to the genus Microlophus but has been attributed to the genus Tropidurus.

== Gallery ==
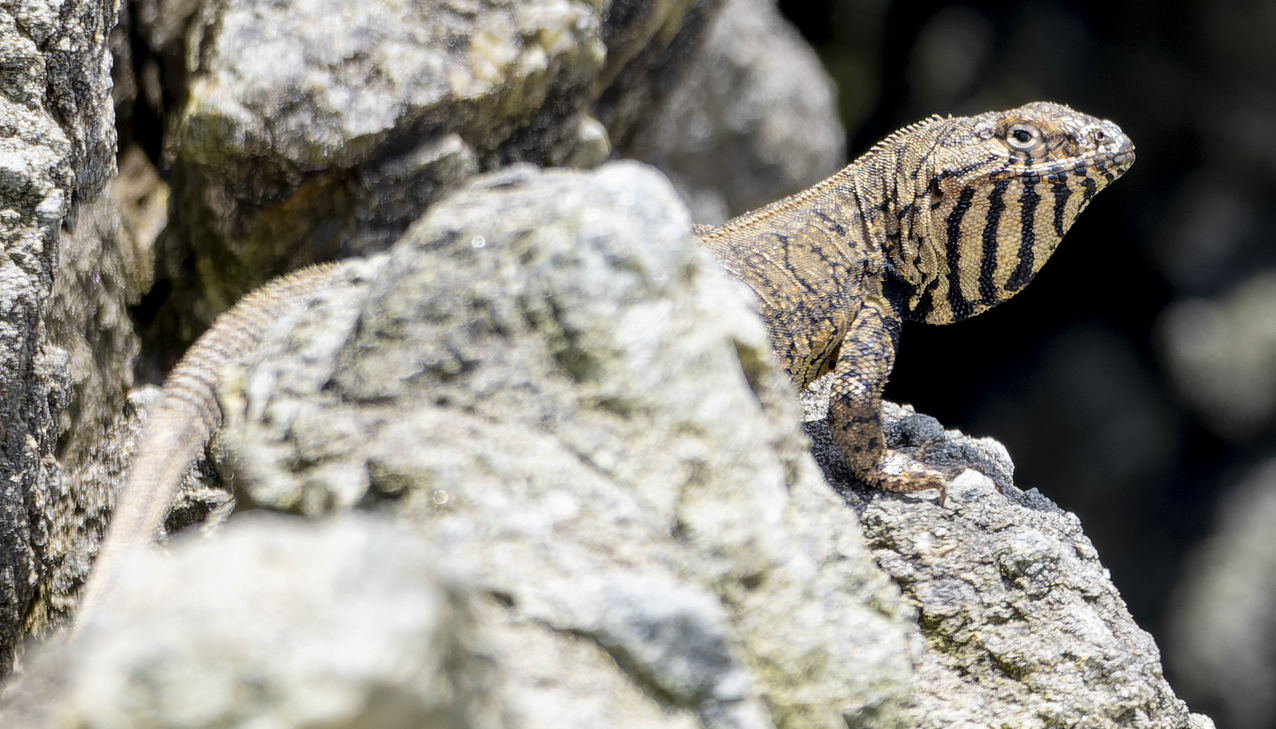
Male

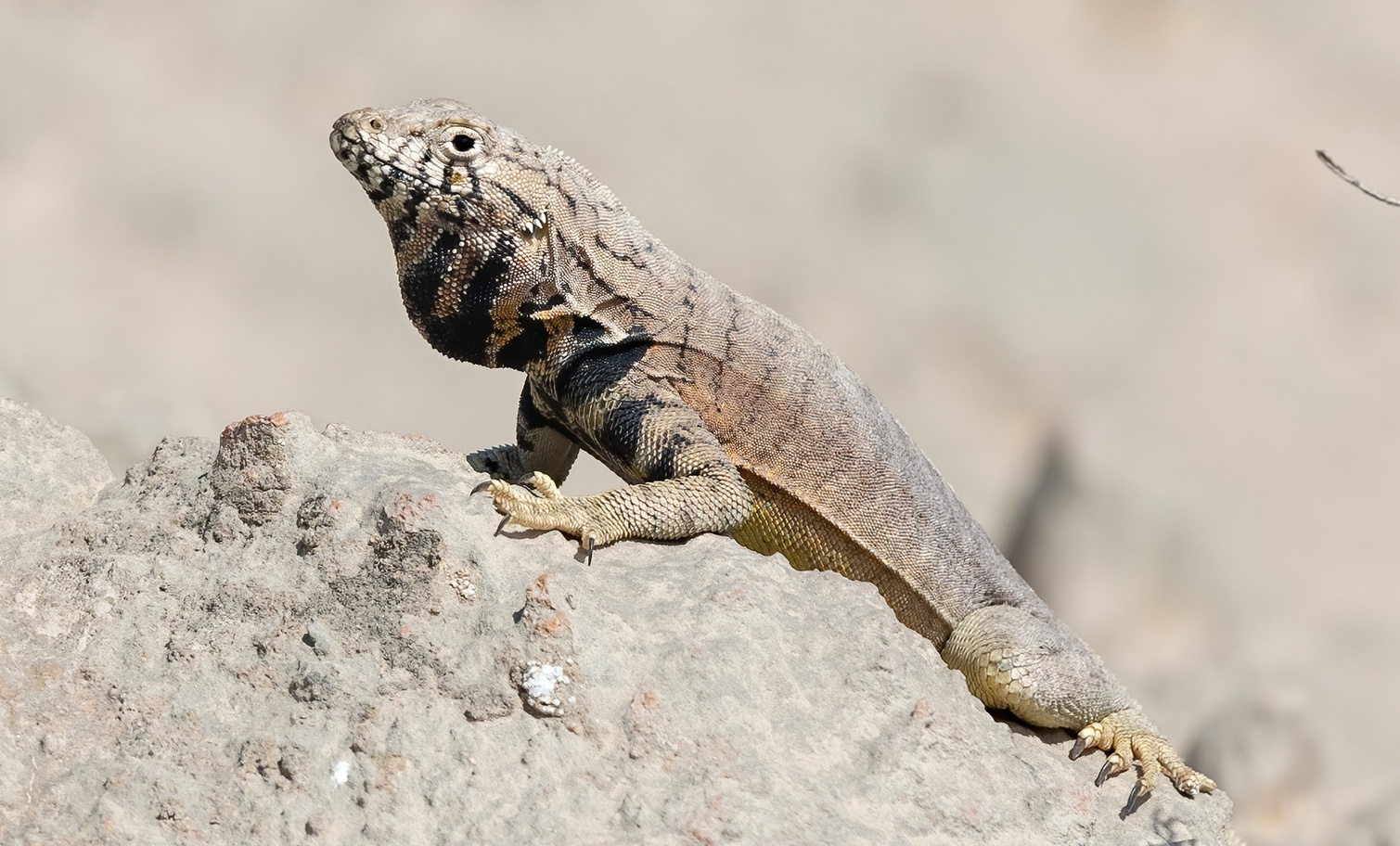
Male

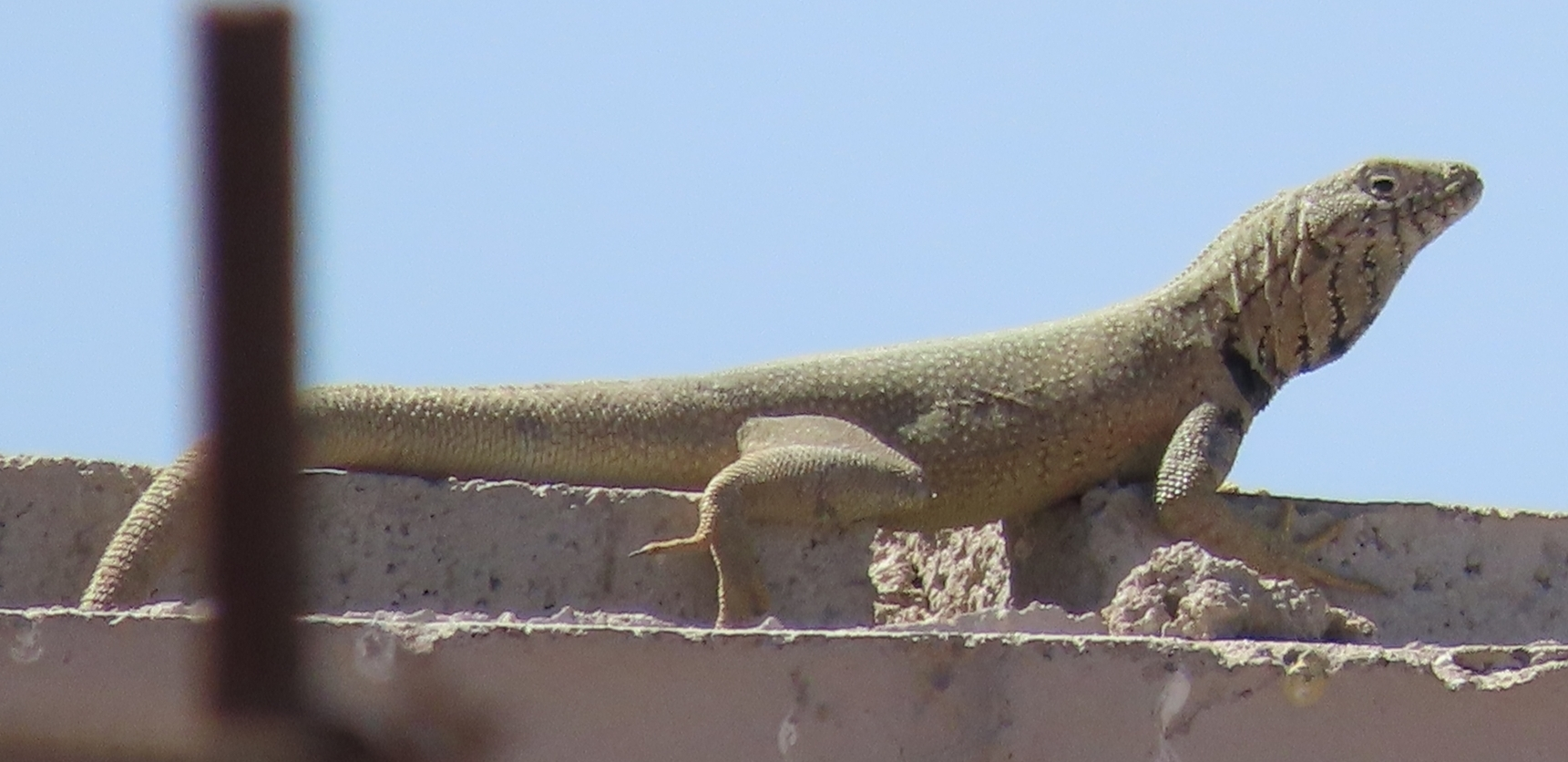
Male

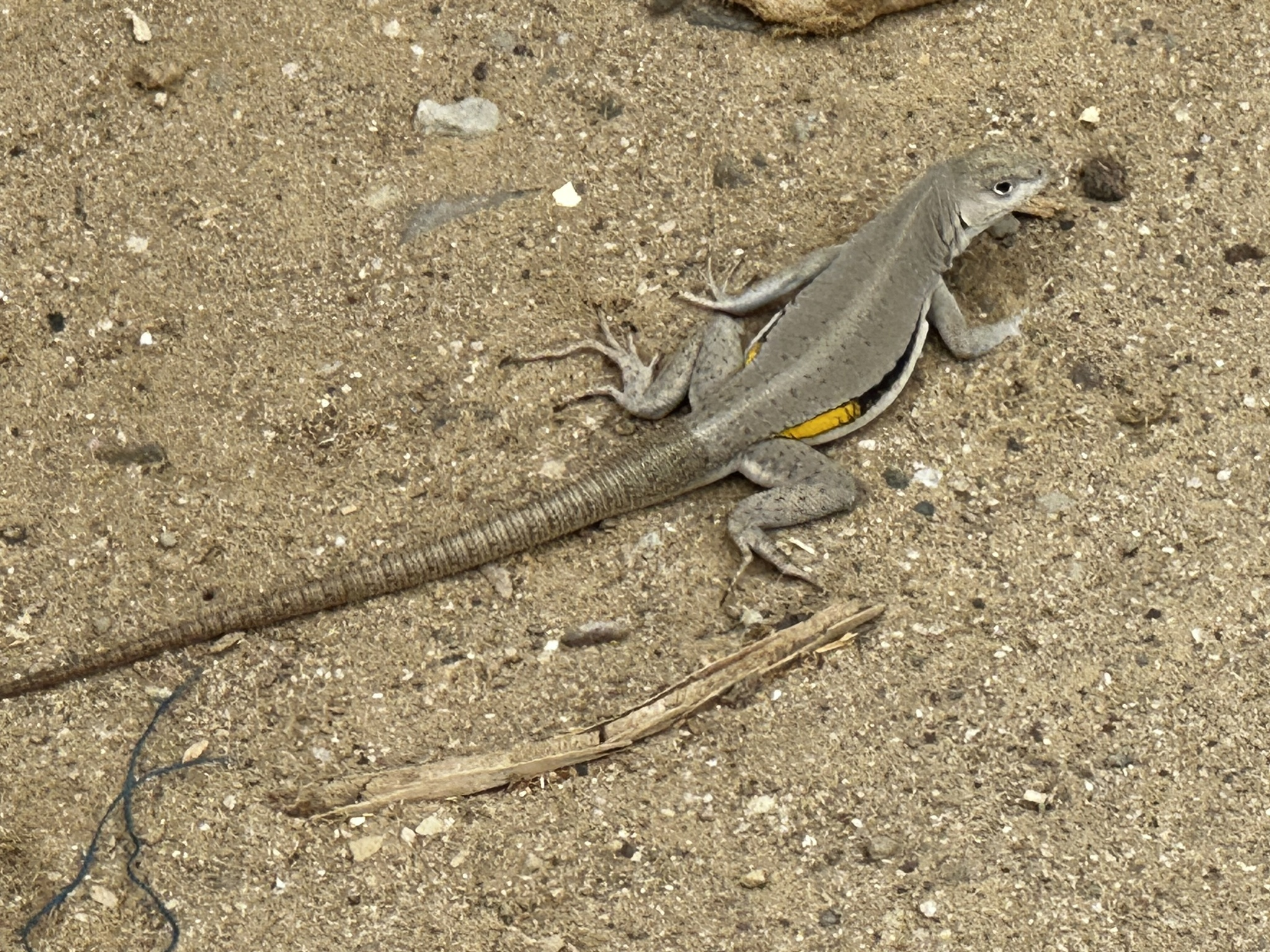
Female
