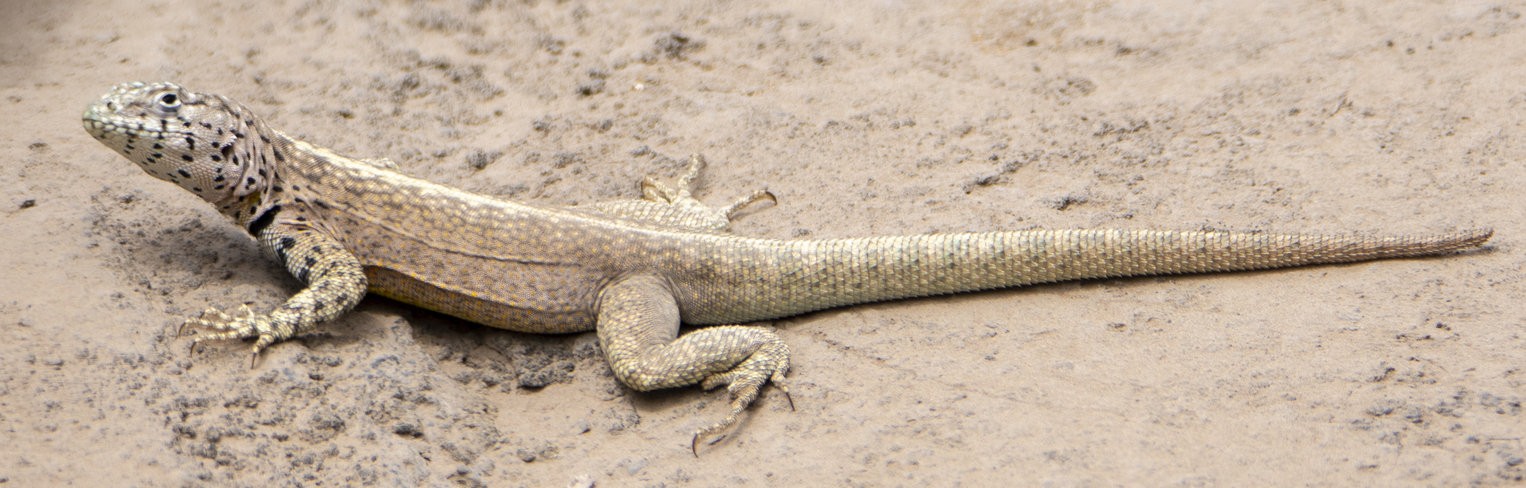
- Male
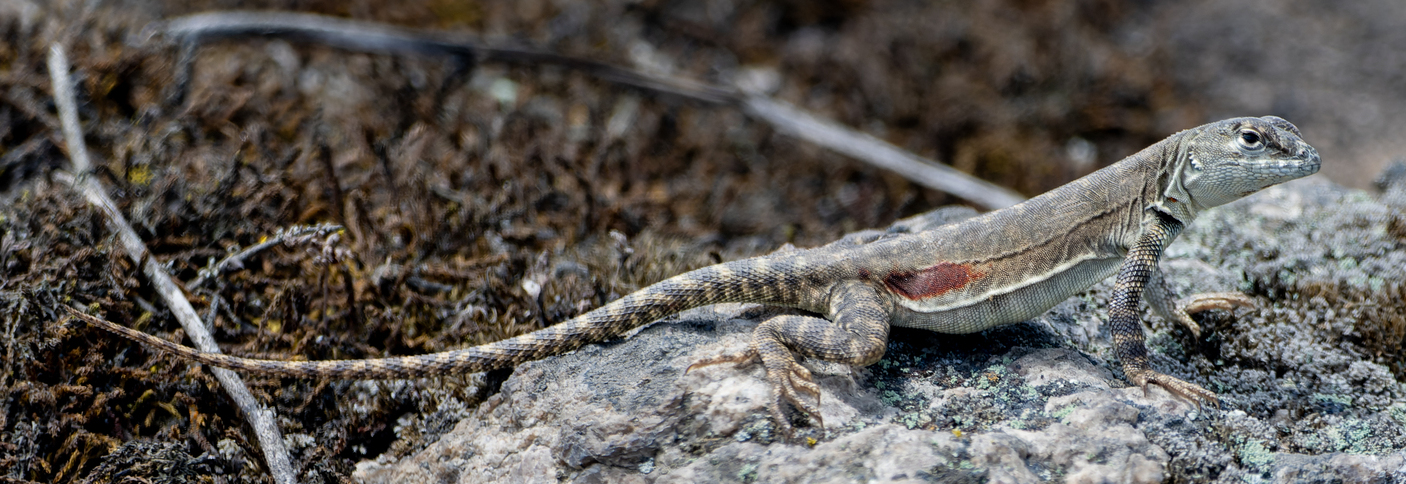
- Female

Conservation status
- Least Concern (IUCN 3.1)

Scientific classification
- Kingdom: Animalia
- Phylum: Chordata
- Class: Reptilia
- Order: Squamata
- Suborder: Iguania
- Family: Tropiduridae
- Genus: Microlophus
- Species: M. tigris

Binomial name
- Microlophus tigris (Tschudi, 1845)

Synonyms
- Steirolepis tigris - Tschudi, 1845; Tropidurus peruvianus tigris - Mertens, 1956; Tropidurus tigris - Dixon & Wright, 1975

= Microlophus tigris =

Species of lizard

Microlophus tigris, the tiger Pacific iguana, is a species of lava lizard endemic to Peru.
