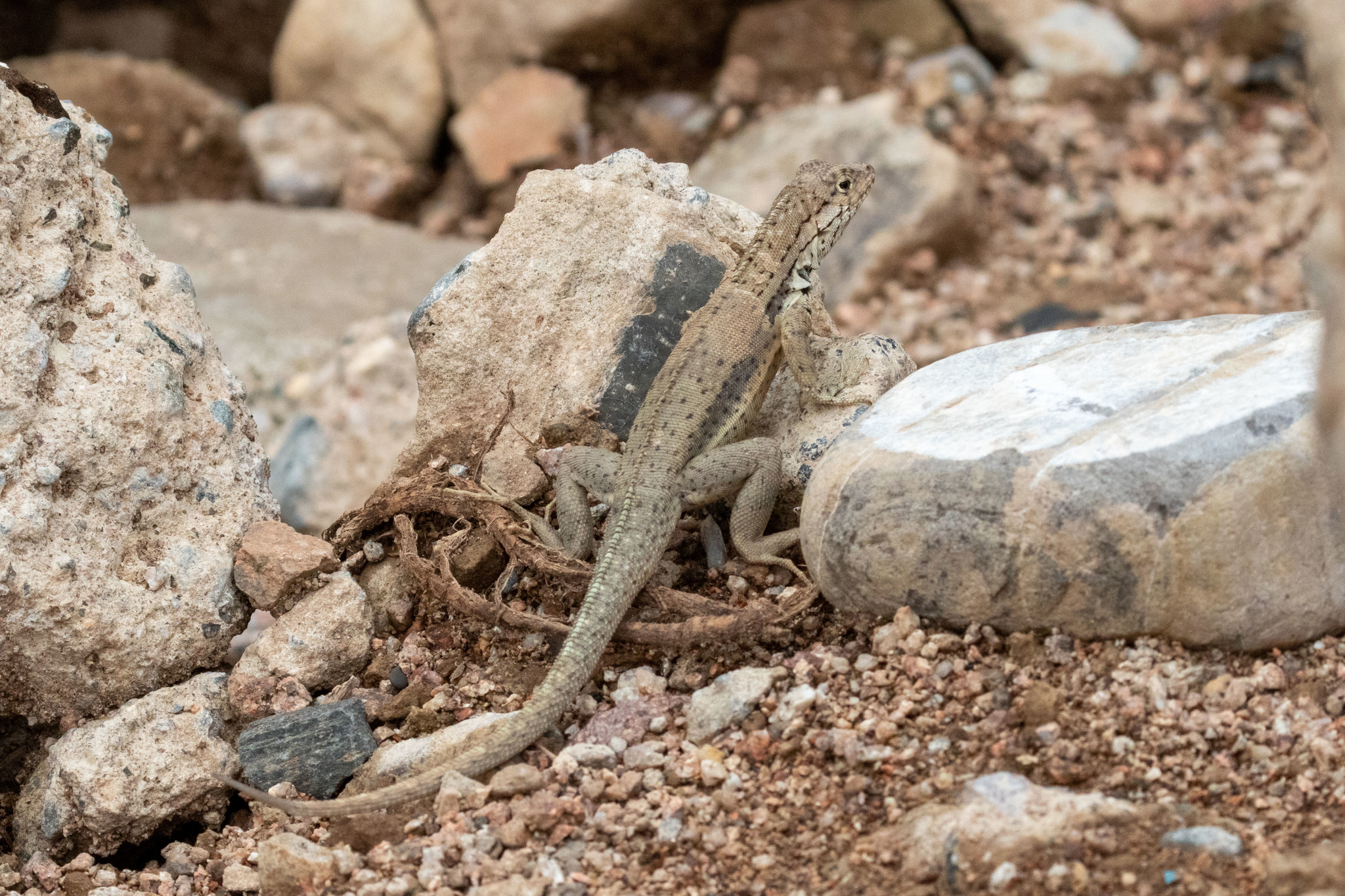
- Male
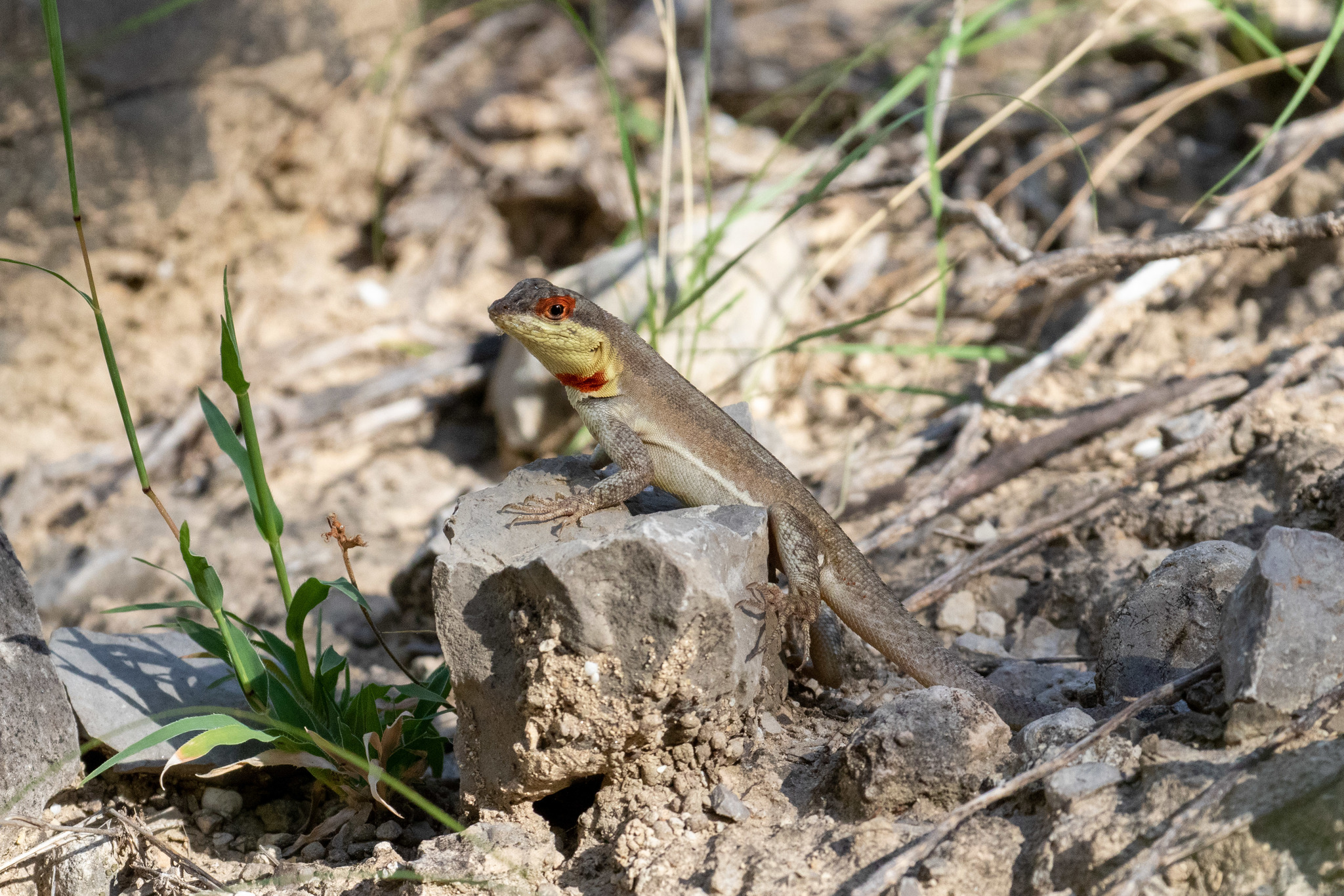
- Female

Scientific classification
- Kingdom: Animalia
- Phylum: Chordata
- Class: Reptilia
- Order: Squamata
- Suborder: Iguania
- Family: Tropiduridae
- Genus: Microlophus
- Species: M. arenarius

Binomial name
- Microlophus arenarius (Tschudi, 1845)

= Microlophus arenarius =

Species of lizard

Microlophus arenarius is a species of South American lava lizard in the family Tropiduridae. The species is endemic to Peru.

== Geographic range ==
Microlophus arenarius is found in Peru.
