= Georg Baur =

American paleontologist

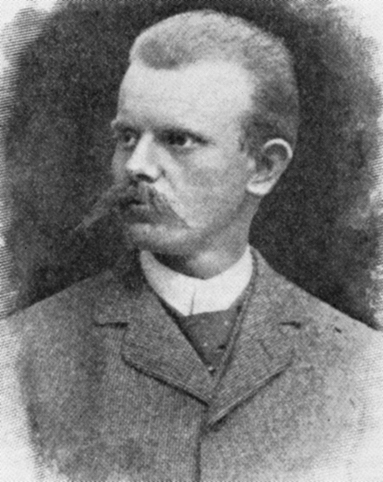
- Born: 1859; Weisswasser, Bohemia
- Died: 1898
- Education: Ludwig-Maximilians-Universität München
- Known for: Palaeontology; Osteology
- Scientific career
- Institutions: Yale University; Clark University; University of Chicago

Georg Baur (1859–1898) was a German vertebrate paleontologist and Neo-Lamarckian who studied reptiles of the Galapagos Islands, particularly the Galápagos tortoises, in the 1890s. He is perhaps best known for his subsidence theory of the origin of the Galapagos Islands, where he postulated the islands were the remains of a former landmass, connected to South America via Cocos Island.

== Early life and education ==
Baur was born in Weisswasser, Bohemia in 1859. He spent his early years Hohenheim near Stuttgart. As his father was a professor of forestry, Baur initially planned to study forestry where his father was a professor. However, while at university he became interested in the fields of geology, paleontology, and botany instead at the University of Hohenheim, the Ludwig-Maximilians-Universität München, and Leipzig University.

== Career ==
Prior to his work on the Galapagos Islands, Baur was an assistant to Othniel Charles Marsh at Yale University from 1884 until 1890. Baur undertook an expedition to the Galápagos Islands in 1891, leaving New York on May 1, arriving in the Galápagos on June 9, and departing the islands on August 26 for Guayaquil, Panama, and the return to New York. Baur named several subspecies of Galápagos tortoise, including Chelonoidis nigra guentheri (Baur, 1889), and Chelonoidis nigra galapagoensis (Baur, 1889). Not all of Baur's tortoise taxa are still considered valid.

He also studied turtles of the southern United States, naming several species new to science. The following species and subspecies of reptiles were named in his honor by other herpetologists: Kinosternon baurii, Phyllodactylus baurii (one of the leaf-toed geckos of the Galápagos Islands), Coelophysis bauri and Terrapene carolina bauri.

He held the position of Docent (lecturer) in osteology and paleontology, Clark University, from 1890 to 1892, and after that, professor and chairman of the osteology and vertebrate paleontology department at the University of Chicago until his death in 1898 at age 39.
