= Pseudalsophis thomasi =

Scientific classification
- Kingdom: Animalia
- Phylum: Chordata
- Class: Reptilia
- Order: Squamata
- Suborder: Serpentes
- Family: Colubridae
- Genus: Pseudalsophis
- Species: P. thomasi

Binomial name
- Pseudalsophis thomasi Zaher et al., 2018

Species of snake

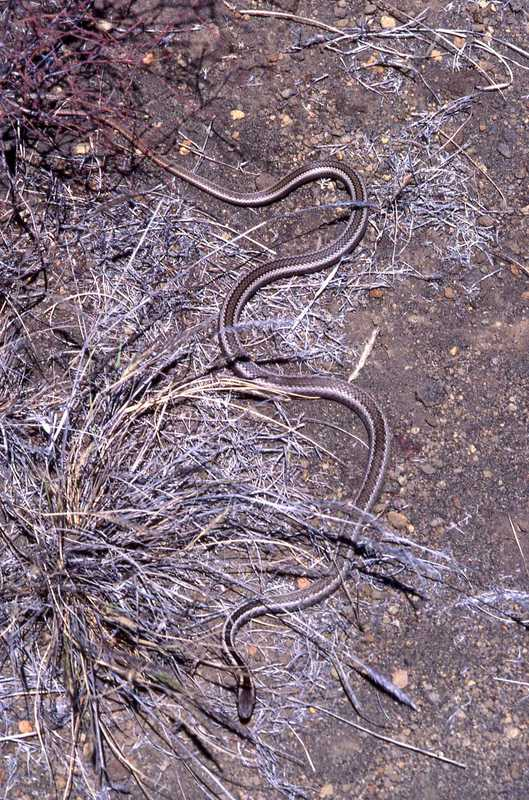
Pseudalsophis thomasi

Pseudalsophis thomasi, or Thomas' racer, a species of snake in the family Colubridae. It is endemic to several islands in the Galápagos group.

== Etymology ==
The genus name Pseudalsophis comes from the name of a genus of Caribbean snakes Alsophis due to their superficial similarities, combined with the Greek word pseudo meaning false. The specific name is in honor of the herpetologist Robert A. Thomas.

== Description ==
Diurnal snakes, active throughout the day with the exception of hot midday hours. They can be found in rocky areas, deciduous forest, and dry grassland habitats. Foraging predators they feed on small animals such as lizards (Microlophus jacobii), geckos (Phyllodactylus maresi), snakes, birds, and insects. Snakes are mildly venomous enough to endanger small prey items but not enough to harm a human. Thomas's Racers have no natural predators however they are preyed upon by introduced black rats.

== Distribution ==
Thomas's racer is endemic to the islands of Santiago, Bartolomé, and Rábida. Its total estimated range is approximately 459 km^{2} It is the more common of the two snake species found on Santiago and Rábida, the other being the much rarer Pseudalsophis hephaestus or Santiago racer. It is also the only snake species known to be present on Bartolomé.
