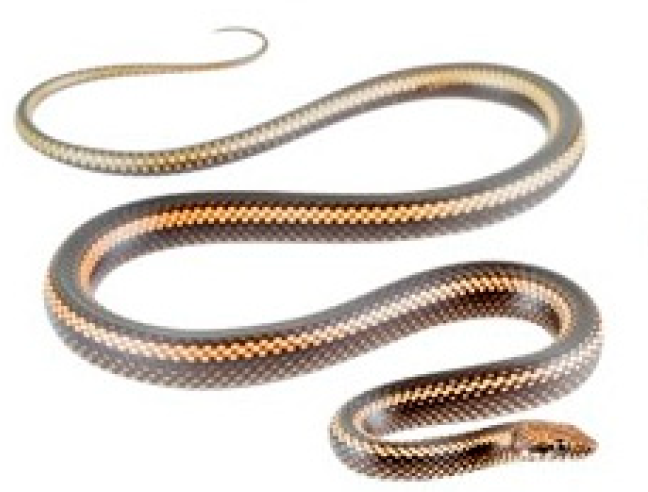

Conservation status
- Near Threatened (IUCN 3.1)

Scientific classification
- Kingdom: Animalia
- Phylum: Chordata
- Class: Reptilia
- Order: Squamata
- Suborder: Serpentes
- Family: Colubridae
- Genus: Pseudalsophis
- Species: P. steindachneri

Binomial name
- Pseudalsophis steindachneri (Van Denburgh, 1912)

Synonyms
- Dromicus steindachneri Van Denburgh, 1912; Antillophis steindachneri (Van Denburgh, 1912)

= Pseudalsophis steindachneri =

Species of snake

Pseudalsophis steindachneri, also known commonly as the Galápagos painted racer, Steindachner's snake, and the striped Galapagos snake, is a species of snake in the subfamily Dipsadinae of the family Colubridae. The species is indigenous to the Galápagos Islands of Ecuador.

== Etymology ==
Pseudalsophis steindachneri is named after Franz Steindachner, an Austrian zoologist, ichthyologist, and herpetologist, who published over 200 papers on fishes and over 50 papers on reptiles and amphibians.

== Description ==
Pseudalsophis steindacneri has smooth dorsal scales, which are arranged in 19 rows at midbody and lack apical pits. The ventrals number 169–180, and the subcaudals number 96–114.

== Geographic range ==
In the Galápagos Islands, Pseudalsophis steindachneri is found on the following islands: Baltra, North Seymour, Rábida, Santa Cruz, and Santiago.

== Habitat ==
The preferred natural habitats of Pseudalsophis steindachneri are forest and shrubland, at elevations from near sea level to 100 m (330 ft).

== Behavior ==
Pseudalsophis steindachneri is terrestrial.

== Reproduction ==
Pseudalsophis steindachneri is oviparous.
