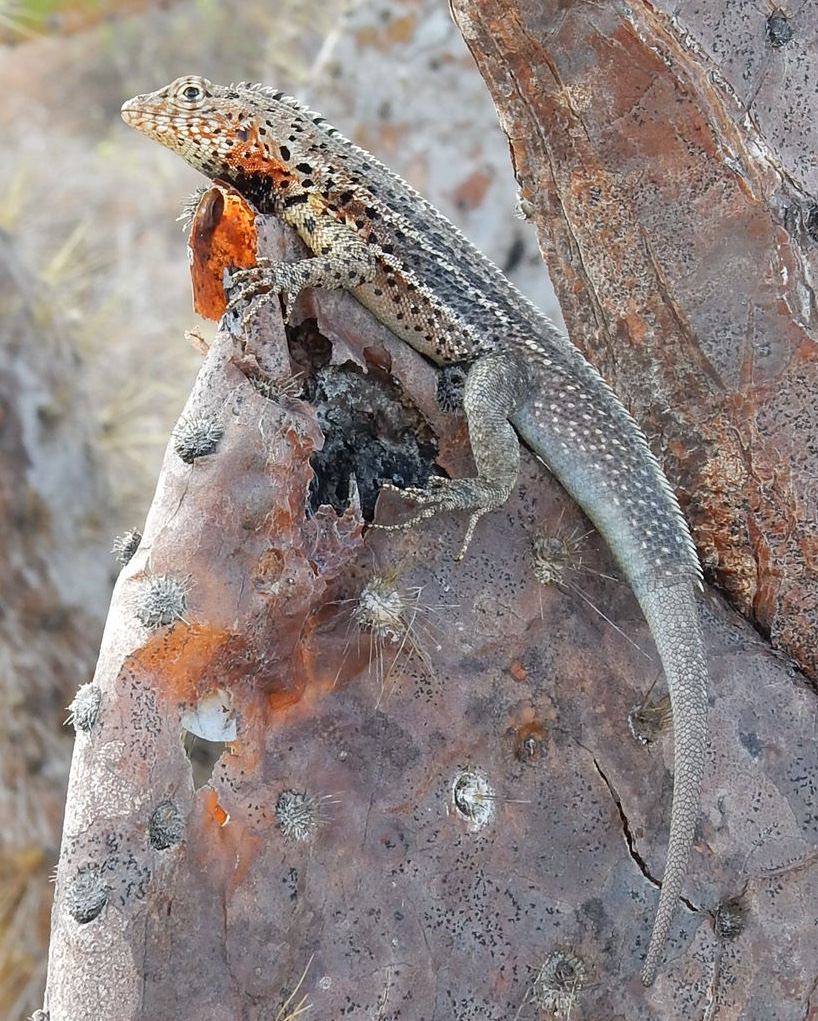
- Male
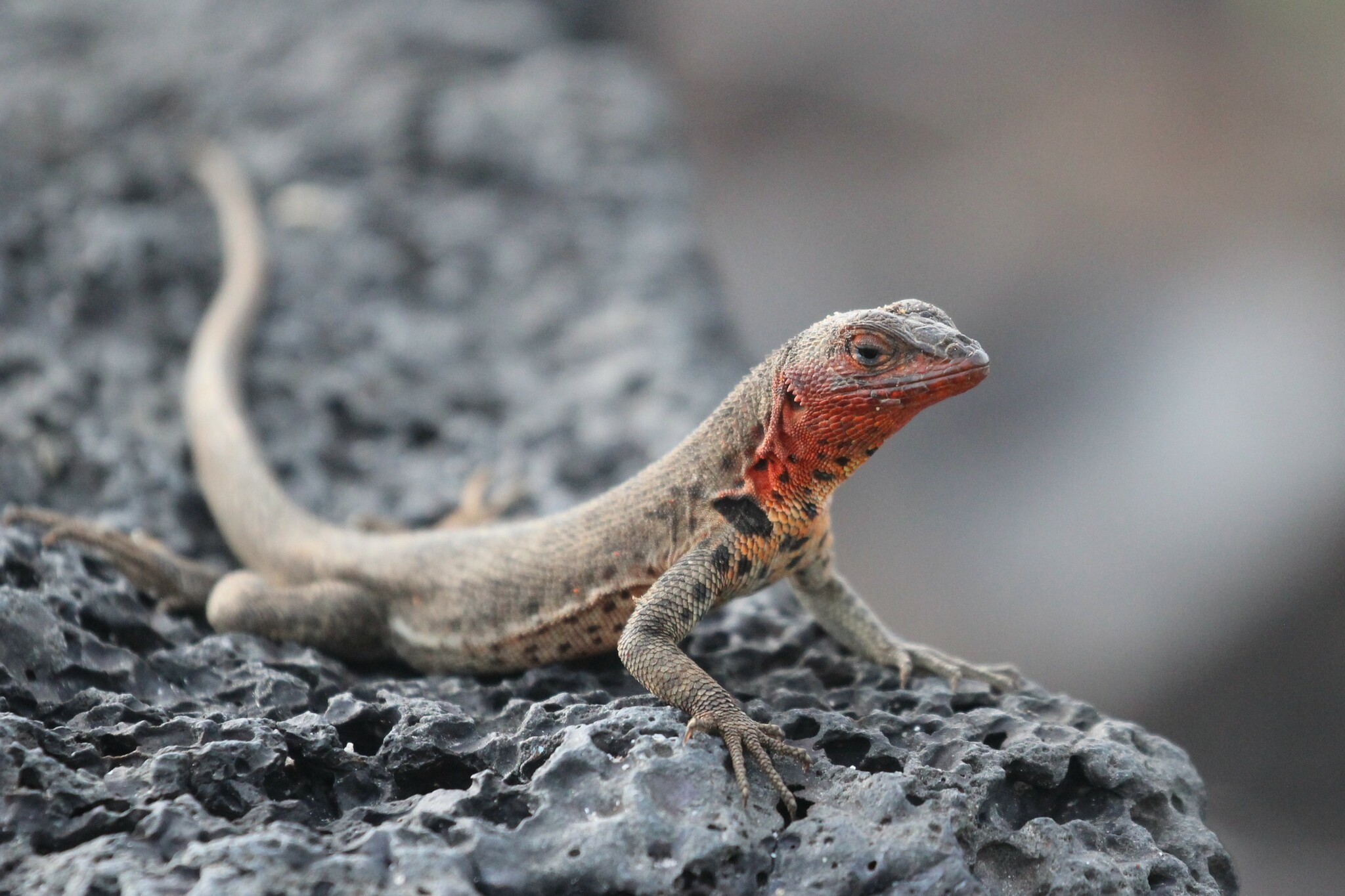
- Female

Conservation status
- Least Concern (IUCN 3.1)

Scientific classification
- Kingdom: Animalia
- Phylum: Chordata
- Class: Reptilia
- Order: Squamata
- Suborder: Iguania
- Family: Tropiduridae
- Genus: Microlophus
- Species: M. jacobii

Binomial name
- Microlophus jacobii (Baur, 1892)

Synonyms
- Tropidurus jacobi Baur, 1892; Microlophus jacobi (Baur, 1892)

= Microlophus jacobii =

Santiago lava lizard

Species of lizard

Microlophus jacobii, the Santiago lava lizard, is a species of lava lizard in the family Tropiduridae. They are endemic to the Galapagos islands of Santiago, Bartolomé, Rábida and a few islets. They are also the only lava lizards present on these islands. This species was formerly considered a subpopulation of the Galápagos lava lizard, but is now widely considered as a distinct species.

== Etymology ==
The genus name Microlophus, meaning "small crest", refers to the small crest on the head, while jacobi refers to the Latin name of the Santiago Island, Jacobi (James).

== Distribution ==
It is endemic to the islands of Santiago, Rábida, Bartolomé, and six surrounding islets in the central Galapagos archipelago. In total the entire species is estimated to only inhabit 463 km^{2}.

== Description ==
Common year-round, these diurnal lizards inhabit rocky volcanic areas of their islands along with dry shrub and grassland. They usually spend the midday hours in the shade to avoid the heat. They spend the night beneath the soil, among rocks or the leaf litter. This species is known to feed on plant material such as leaves, fruit, and seeds, along with insects. They have native predators such as Thomas's racer and invasive threats that were introduced by humans such as black rats. To escape from these predators, Santiago lava lizards have been known to run and hide in crevices along with climbing on the abandoned nests of Santiago Island giant tortoises.

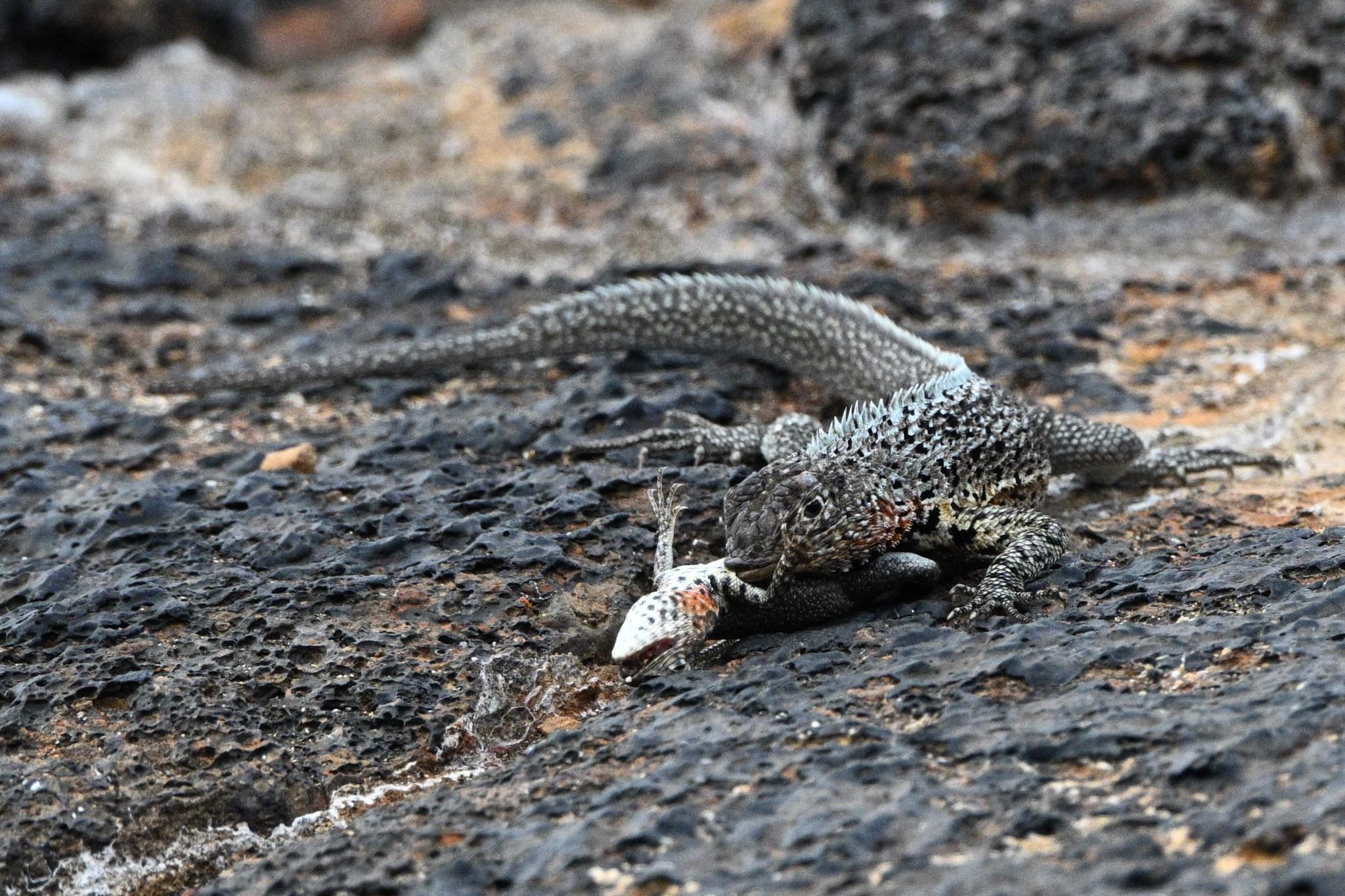
Male cannibalizing a juvenile

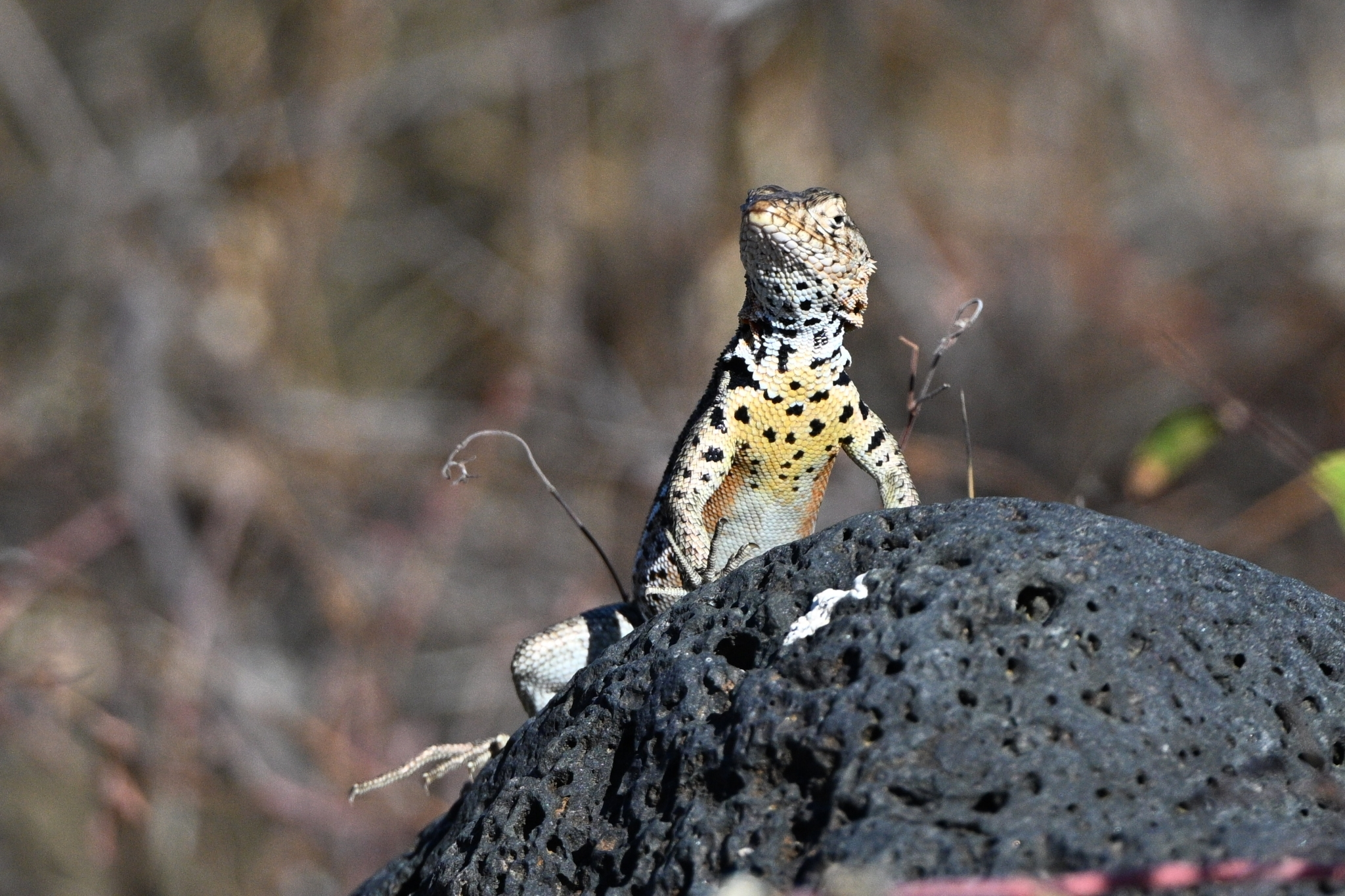
Showing underside

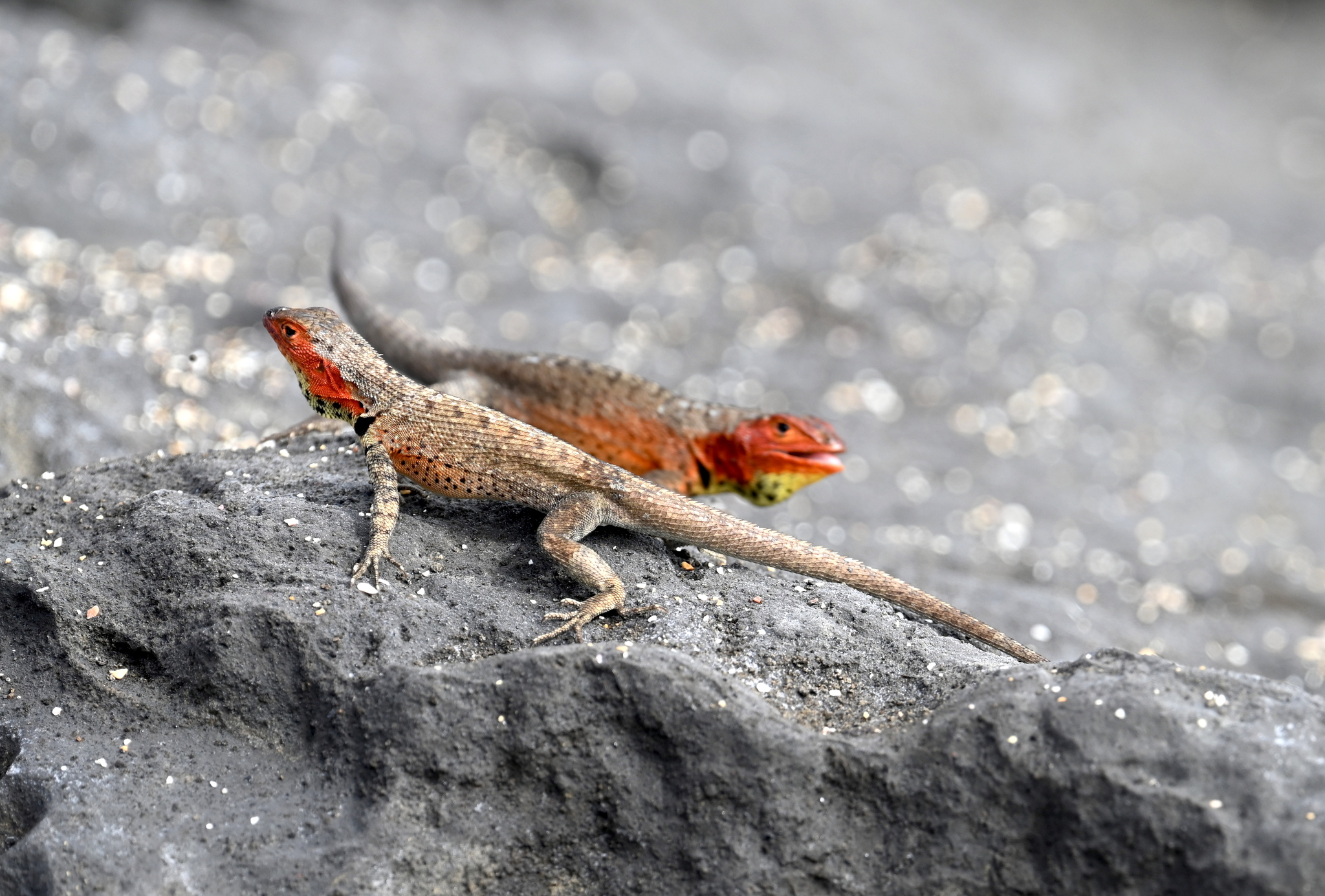
Aggressive displaying between females

=== Sexual dimorphism ===
Females are about 19 cm long, while males tend to be larger at around 27 cm. Generally, females have a brown body with black markings around their shoulder and a bright orange or red colour on their face. Males tend to have more variety in their colour than females and have black and white spots on their brown body. There is also much variation in colors and skin patterns within species. Males of the species are distinguished by having a raised middorsal crest.

== Reproduction ==
Santiago lava lizards are oviparous, females lay 1–3 eggs in nests near rocks or vegetation. These nests are dug out of sandy parts of the islands. Females then protect the nests from predators and other females trying to disturb them. For courtship, males perform push-up displays and fight over territory.

== Conservation ==
The species is listed as least concern by the IUCN Red List. Santiago Island, which makes up most of their range, is not permanently inhabited by humans, and the entirety of their range is situated within Ecuador's Galapagos National Park. The only threat the species faces is the introduced population of black rats preying on them.
