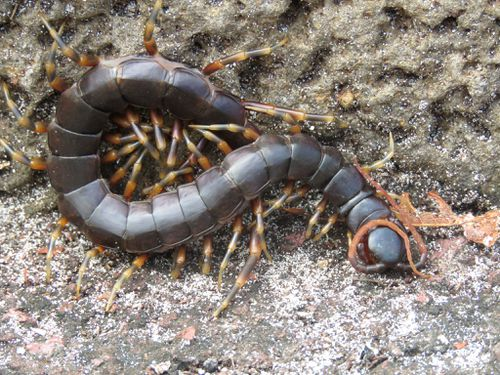

Scientific classification
- Domain: Eukaryota
- Kingdom: Animalia
- Phylum: Arthropoda
- Subphylum: Myriapoda
- Class: Chilopoda
- Order: Scolopendromorpha
- Family: Scolopendridae
- Genus: Scolopendra
- Species: S. galapagoensis

Binomial name
- Scolopendra galapagoensis Bollmann, 1889

Synonyms
- Scolopendra gigentea weyrauchi (Bücherl, 1950); Hemiscolopendra galapagosa (Chamberlain, 1955)

= Scolopendra galapagoensis =

Centipede species

Scolopendra galapagoensis, also known as the Galápagos centipede and Darwin's goliath centipede, is species of very large centipede in the family Scolopendridae. It is the only representative of the genus Scolopendra on the Galapagos Islands, among twelve other species of centipede present on the Islands. It is also found on mainland South America in Ecuador and Peru, and on Cocos Island in Costa Rica.

== Appearance ==
The Galápagos Centipede is one of the largest species of centipede in the world. Specimens have been recorded with lengths up to 30 cm.

=== Colour morphs ===
Scolopendra galapagoensis exhibits two colour morphs:

#	Body	Legs	Notes	Images
1	Dark green to black	Striped, Orange to dark brown	Known as 'Dark Morph' to enthusiasts	
2	Orange-red	Pale Yellow	Known as 'Orange Morph' to enthusiasts	

== Diet and predation ==
S. galapagoensis has been reported preying on crickets, newborn rodents, the Galapagos Rice Rat, and, in one paper, a Floreana Racer snake. It is hunted by a variety of birds of prey including the Galapagos hawk, two species of mockingbird, and the common Black Rat.

== Further reading & external links ==
- Neotype designation and a diagnostic account for the centipede, Scolopendra gigantea L. 1758, with an account of S. galapagoensis Bollman 1889
- Scolopendra galapagoensis - Charles Darwin Foundation
- YouTube- Scolopendra galapagoensis (Orange Morph) behaviour in enclosure
