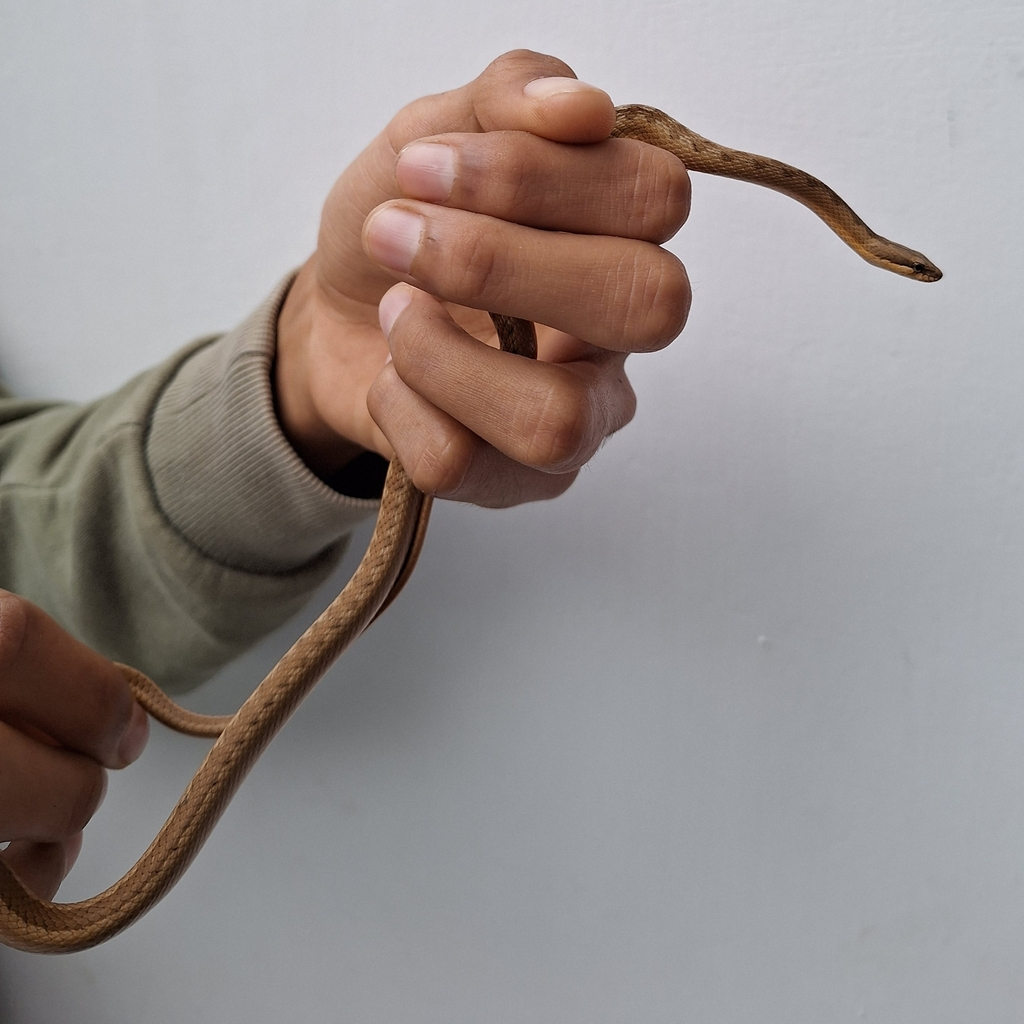
- Pseudalsophis elegans from Trujillo, Peru

Conservation status
- Least Concern (IUCN 3.1)

Scientific classification
- Kingdom: Animalia
- Phylum: Chordata
- Class: Reptilia
- Order: Squamata
- Suborder: Serpentes
- Family: Colubridae
- Genus: Pseudalsophis
- Species: P. elegans

Binomial name
- Pseudalsophis elegans (Tschudi, 1845)

= Pseudalsophis elegans =

Species of snake

Pseudalsophis elegans is a species of snake of the family Colubridae. Common names include South American elegant racer and Guayaquil racer. It is the only snake species of the genus Pseudalsophis not found in the Galapagos Islands.

== Morphology ==
Pseudalsophis elegans is a small-to-medium-sized snake. The maximum reported snout-vent length is 41.5 cm for males and 99.1 cm for females.

The dorsal scales are smooth and in 19 rows near the head and at midbody, and 15 or 17 rows near the tail. There are 187−213 ventral scales and 87-119 subcaudal scales. On the head, there are usually 8 supralabials, 10 infralabials, 1 preocular and 2 postocular scales.

== Taxonomy ==
=== Etymology ===
The specific epithet elegans (Latin for "elegant") refers to the dorsal pattern, a dark longitudinal stripe with undulating margins toward the head, changing to straight-edged and unbroken toward the tail.

=== Nomenclatural history ===
This snake was redescribed four times as a new species, which Schmidt and Walker (1943) thought was related "to the variable coloration and to the differences between the juvenile and adult, as well as to the fallibility of taxonomists".

=== Phylogenetic relationships ===
All recent analyses support a sister relationship between P. elegans and the species of Pseudalsophis in the Galapagos.

== Distribution and habitat ==
=== Geographic range ===
This snake is found in the southwestern part of mainland Ecuador, as well as in coastal Peru and northern Chile, west of the Andes Mountains.

=== Biogeography ===
Molecular evidence suggests that P. elegans diverged from the ancestor of the Galapagos species of Pseudalsophis about 6.9 million years ago. Because the oldest of the Galapagos Islands is a little under 4 million years old, the ancestors of the Galapagos Pseudalsophis must have initially colonized Proto-Galapagos Islands that have since subsided beneath the ocean. At the time, the colonists probably would have been considered conspecific with P. elegans, but have since diversified into 9 species, whereas the mainland lineage has remained a single species.

=== Habitat ===
This species is terrestrial and can be found in deserts, shrublands, and seasonally dry forests.

== Biology ==
=== Diet ===
There are no detailed studies of the diet of P. elegans. They have been reported to feed on lizards, including the cercosaurine gymnophthalmid Macropholidus ruthveni and the teiid Dicrodon guttulatum.

=== Venom ===
Snakes of the genus Pseudalsophis are opisthoglyphous and mildly venomous, but not dangerous to humans.

=== Reproduction ===
A wild-caught female from Lambayeque, Peru, laid 6 eggs in March. No other information about reproduction has been reported.
