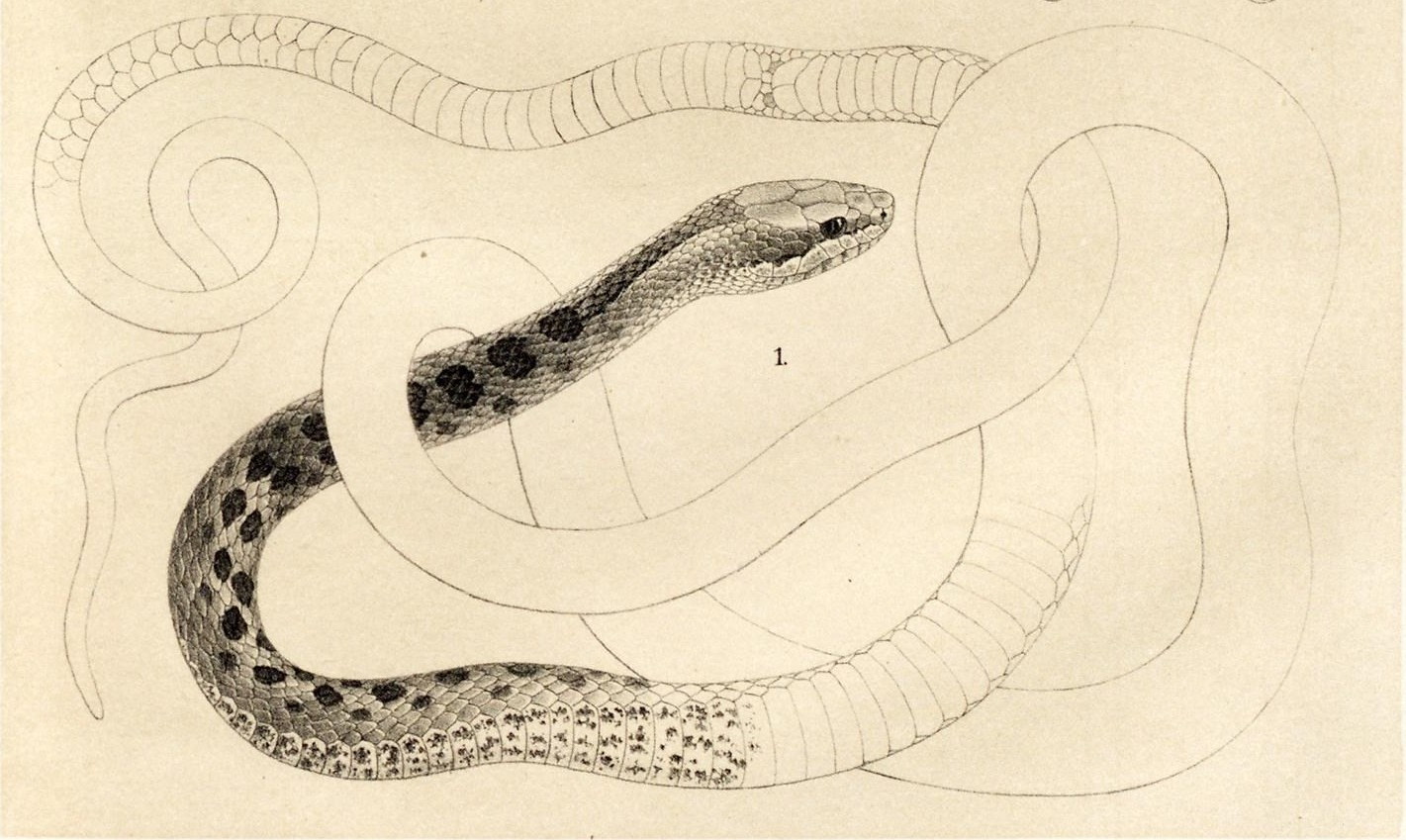
- Pseudalsophis dorsalis

Scientific classification
- Kingdom: Animalia
- Phylum: Chordata
- Class: Reptilia
- Order: Squamata
- Suborder: Serpentes
- Family: Colubridae
- Subfamily: Dipsadinae
- Genus: Pseudalsophis; Hussam Zaher et al., 2009

Species
- Ten

Synonyms
- Alsophis, Antillophis

= Pseudalsophis =

Genus of snakes

Pseudalsophis is a genus of snakes in the family Colubridae. The genus is endemic to South America. Out of the ten species, nine are endemic to the Galapagos Islands.

== Geographic range ==
Species in the genus Pseudalsophis are found in Ecuador (particularly the Galápagos), Chile and Peru.

== Species ==
Ten species are recognized as being valid.

- Pseudalsophis biserialis (Günther, 1860) – Galápagos racer
- Pseudalsophis darwini (Zaher, Yánez-Muñoz, Rodrigues, Graboski, Machado, Altamirano-Benavides, Bonatto, & Grazziotin, 2018) – Darwin's racer
- Pseudalsophis dorsalis (Steindachner, 1876) – Central Galapagos racer
- Pseudalsophis elegans (Tschudi, 1845) – South American elegant racer, Guayaquil racer
- Pseudalsophis hephaestus (Zaher et al, Yánez-Muñoz, Rodrigues, Graboski, Machado, Altamirano-Benavides, Bonatto, & Grazziotin, 2018) – Santiago racer
- Pseudalsophis hoodensis (Van Denburgh, 1912) – Espanola racer
- Pseudalsophis occidentalis (Van Denburgh, 1912) – Western Galapagos racer
- Pseudalsophis slevini (Van Denburgh, 1912) – Banded Galápagos snake
- Pseudalsophis steindachneri (Van Denburgh, 1912) – Striped Galápagos snake
- Pseudalsophis thomasi (Zaher et al., 2018) – Thomas's racer

Nota bene: A binomial authority in parentheses indicates that the species was originally described in a genus other than Pseudalsophis.

== Etymology ==
The specific names, slevini and steidachneri, are in honor of American herpetologist Joseph Richard Slevin and Austrian herpetologist Franz Steindachner, respectively.
