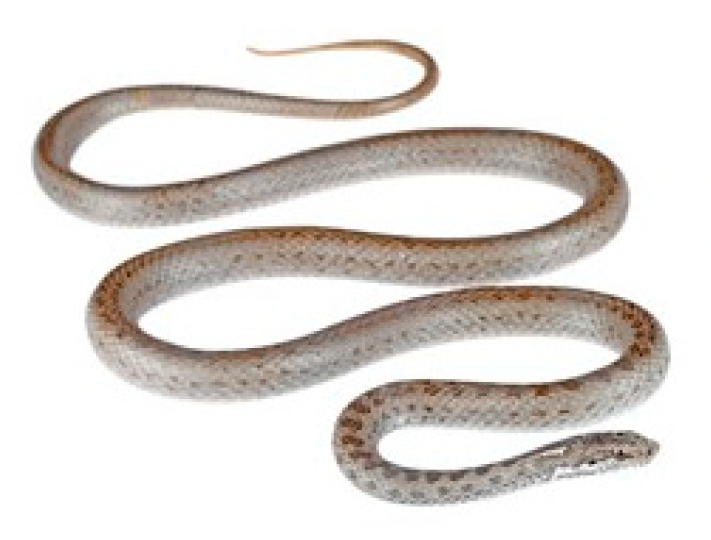

Conservation status
- Least Concern (IUCN 3.1)

Scientific classification
- Kingdom: Animalia
- Phylum: Chordata
- Class: Reptilia
- Order: Squamata
- Suborder: Serpentes
- Family: Colubridae
- Genus: Pseudalsophis
- Species: P. dorsalis

Binomial name
- Pseudalsophis dorsalis (Steindachner, 1876)

= Pseudalsophis dorsalis =

Species of snake

Pseudalsophis dorsalis, otherwise known as the Central Galapagos racer or the Santa Cruz racer is a species of snake of the family Colubridae.

== Geographic range ==
The snake is endemic to Santa Cruz Island in the Galápagos Islands.
