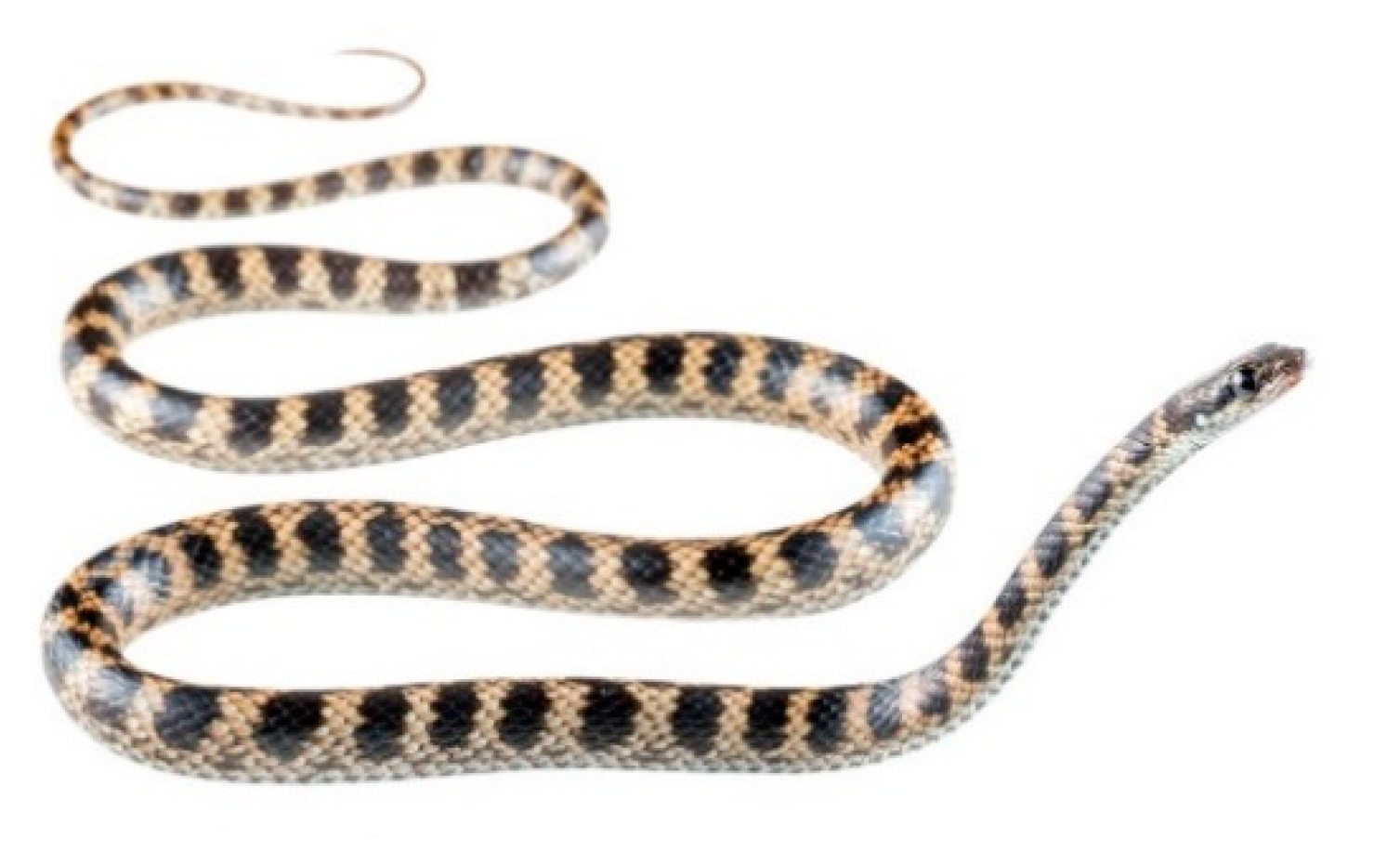

Conservation status
- Vulnerable (IUCN 3.1)

Scientific classification
- Kingdom: Animalia
- Phylum: Chordata
- Class: Reptilia
- Order: Squamata
- Suborder: Serpentes
- Family: Colubridae
- Genus: Pseudalsophis
- Species: P. slevini

Binomial name
- Pseudalsophis slevini (Van Denburgh, 1912)

Synonyms
- Antillophis slevini

= Pseudalsophis slevini =

Species of snake

Pseudalsophis slevini , the banded Galapagos snake or Pinzon racer, is a species of snake of the family Colubridae. It is named for Joseph Slevin, a curator at the California Academy of Sciences.

== Geographic range ==
The snake is endemic to Pinzon Island in the Galápagos Islands.
