= Pseudalsophis darwini =

Scientific classification
- Kingdom: Animalia
- Phylum: Chordata
- Class: Reptilia
- Order: Squamata
- Suborder: Serpentes
- Family: Colubridae
- Genus: Pseudalsophis
- Species: P. darwini

Binomial name
- Pseudalsophis darwini Zaher, Yánez-Muñoz, Rodrigues, Graboski, Machado, Altamirano-Benavides, Bonatto, & Grazziotin 2018

Species of snake

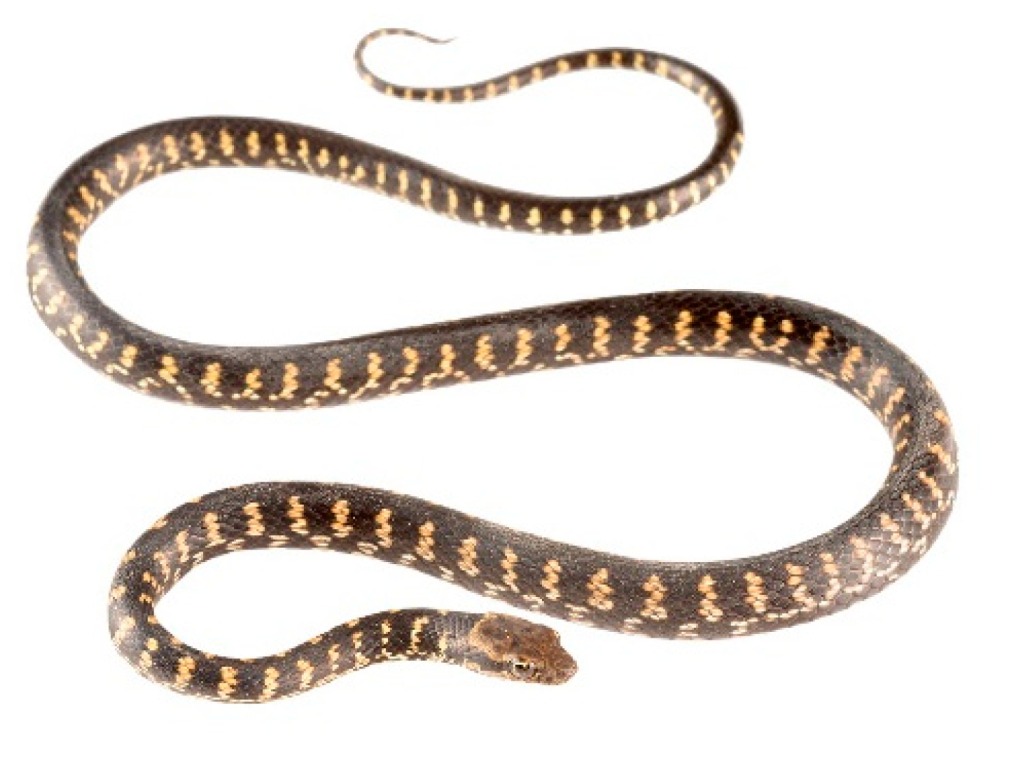
Pseudalsophis darwini

Pseudalsophis darwini, otherwise known as Darwin's racer, is a species of snake of the family Colubridae.

== Name ==
This species of snake is named after the famous naturalist Charles Darwin, who described many species in the Galapagos Islands and discovered the theory of evolution.

== Geographic range ==
The snake is endemic to Fernandina Island and Isabela Island in the Galápagos Islands, as well as a small islet nearby, Isla Tortuga.
