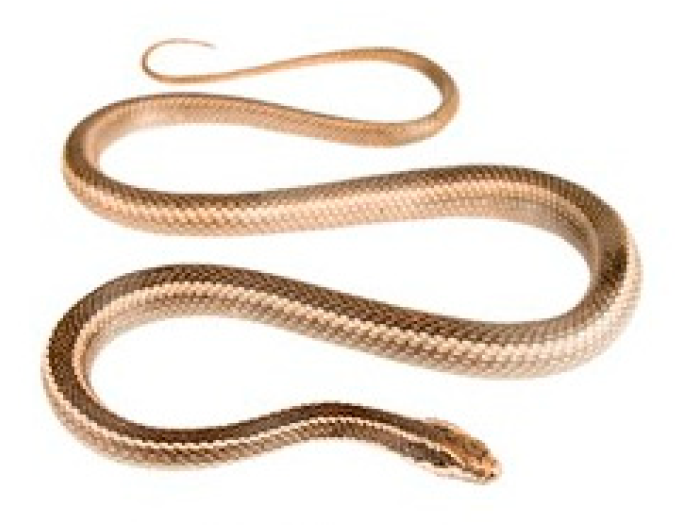

Conservation status
- Near Threatened (IUCN 3.1)

Scientific classification
- Kingdom: Animalia
- Phylum: Chordata
- Class: Reptilia
- Order: Squamata
- Suborder: Serpentes
- Family: Colubridae
- Genus: Pseudalsophis
- Species: P. hoodensis

Binomial name
- Pseudalsophis hoodensis (Van Denburgh, 1912)

= Pseudalsophis hoodensis =

Species of snake

Pseudalsophis hoodensis, otherwise known as the Espanola racer, is a species of snake of the family Colubridae.

== Etymolotgy ==
The word "hoodensis" is derived from the word Hood, which is another name for Española Island.

== Geographic range ==
The snake is endemic to Española Island in the Galápagos Islands.
