= Pseudalsophis occidentalis =

Conservation status
- Least Concern (IUCN 3.1)

Scientific classification
- Kingdom: Animalia
- Phylum: Chordata
- Class: Reptilia
- Order: Squamata
- Suborder: Serpentes
- Family: Colubridae
- Genus: Pseudalsophis
- Species: P. occidentalis

Binomial name
- Pseudalsophis occidentalis (Van Denburgh, 1912)

Species of snake

Pseudalsophis occidentalis otherwise known as the Western Galapagos racer, is a species of snake of the family Colubridae.

== Geographic range ==
The snake is found on Fernandina Island and Isabela Island in the Galápagos Islands, as well as two small nearby islets, Isla Cowley and Isla Tortuga.
