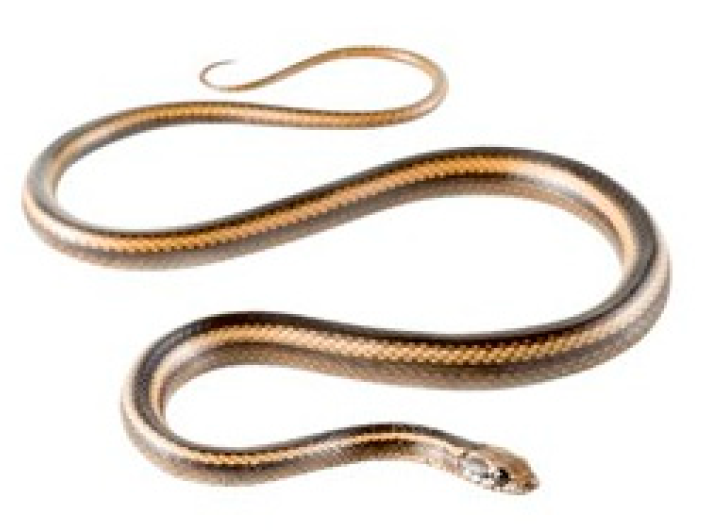

Scientific classification
- Kingdom: Animalia
- Phylum: Chordata
- Class: Reptilia
- Order: Squamata
- Suborder: Serpentes
- Family: Colubridae
- Genus: Pseudalsophis
- Species: P. hephaestus

Binomial name
- Pseudalsophis hephaestus Zaher, Yánez-Muñoz, Rodrigues, Graboski, Machado, Altamirano-Benavides, Bonatto, & Grazziotin, 2018

= Pseudalsophis hephaestus =

Species of snake

Pseudalsophis hephaestus, otherwise known as the Santiago racer, is a species of snake of the family Colubridae.

== Distribution ==
The snake is endemic to Santiago Island in the Galápagos Islands.
