= Rábida Island =

Island in the Galápagos Archipelago

Rábida Island (Jervis Island)
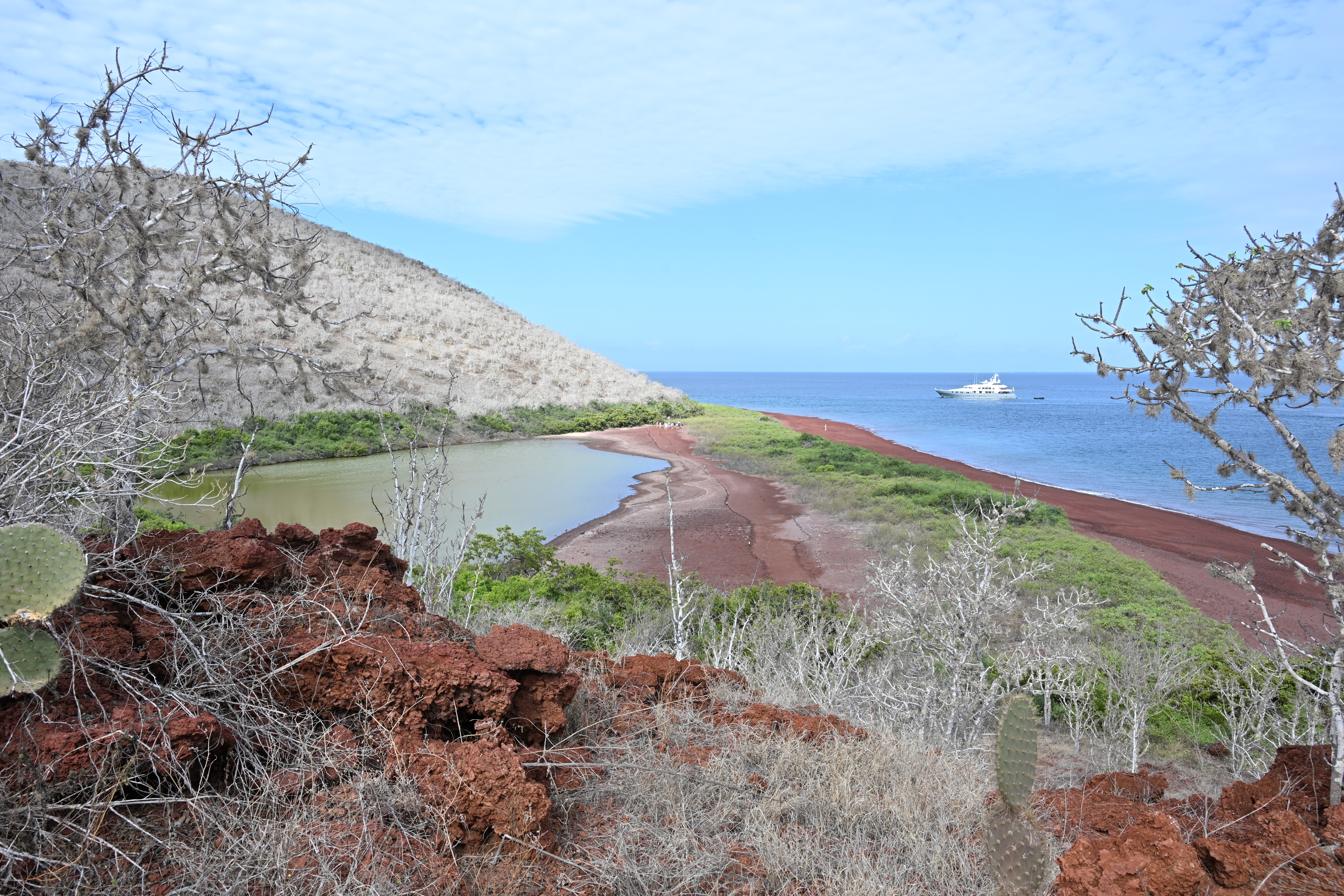
- Rábida - red beach and lagoon

- Location within Galápagos Islands

Geography
- Location: Galápagos Islands, Ecuador
- Coordinates: 0.416245°S 90.710897°W
- Archipelago: Galápagos Islands
- Highest elevation: 367 m (1204 ft)

Administration
- Ecuador

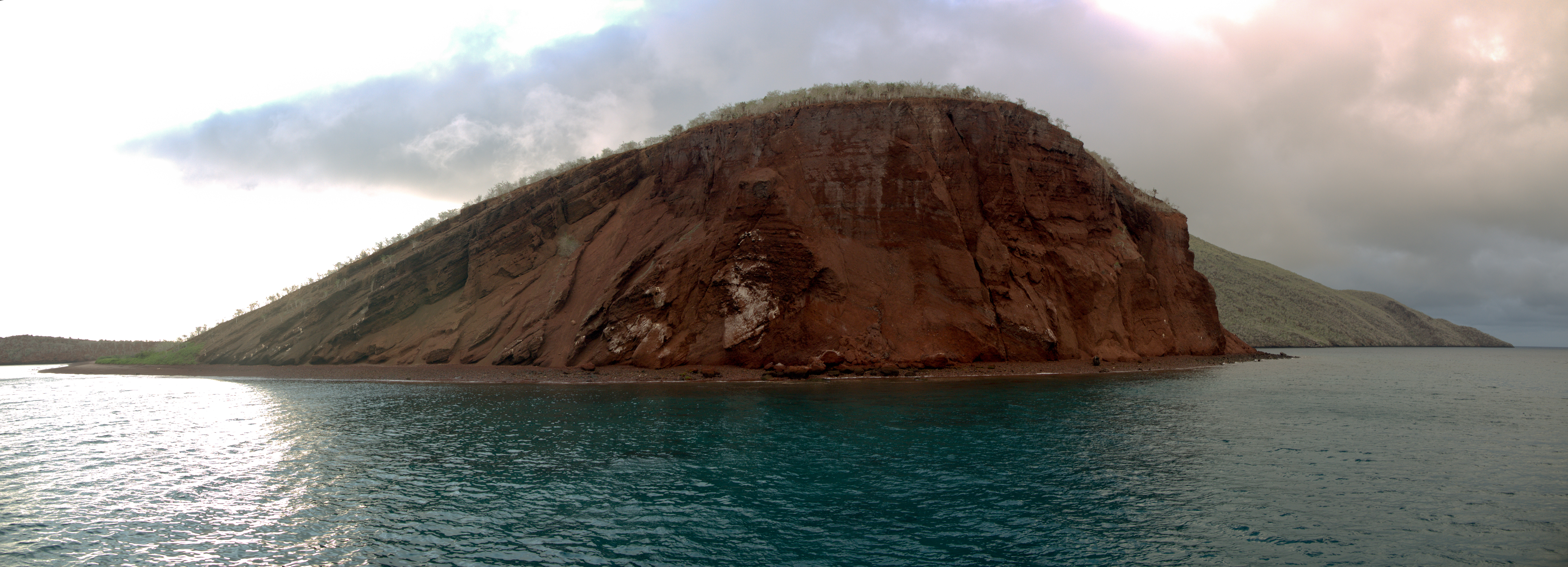
Panorama of Rábida Island.

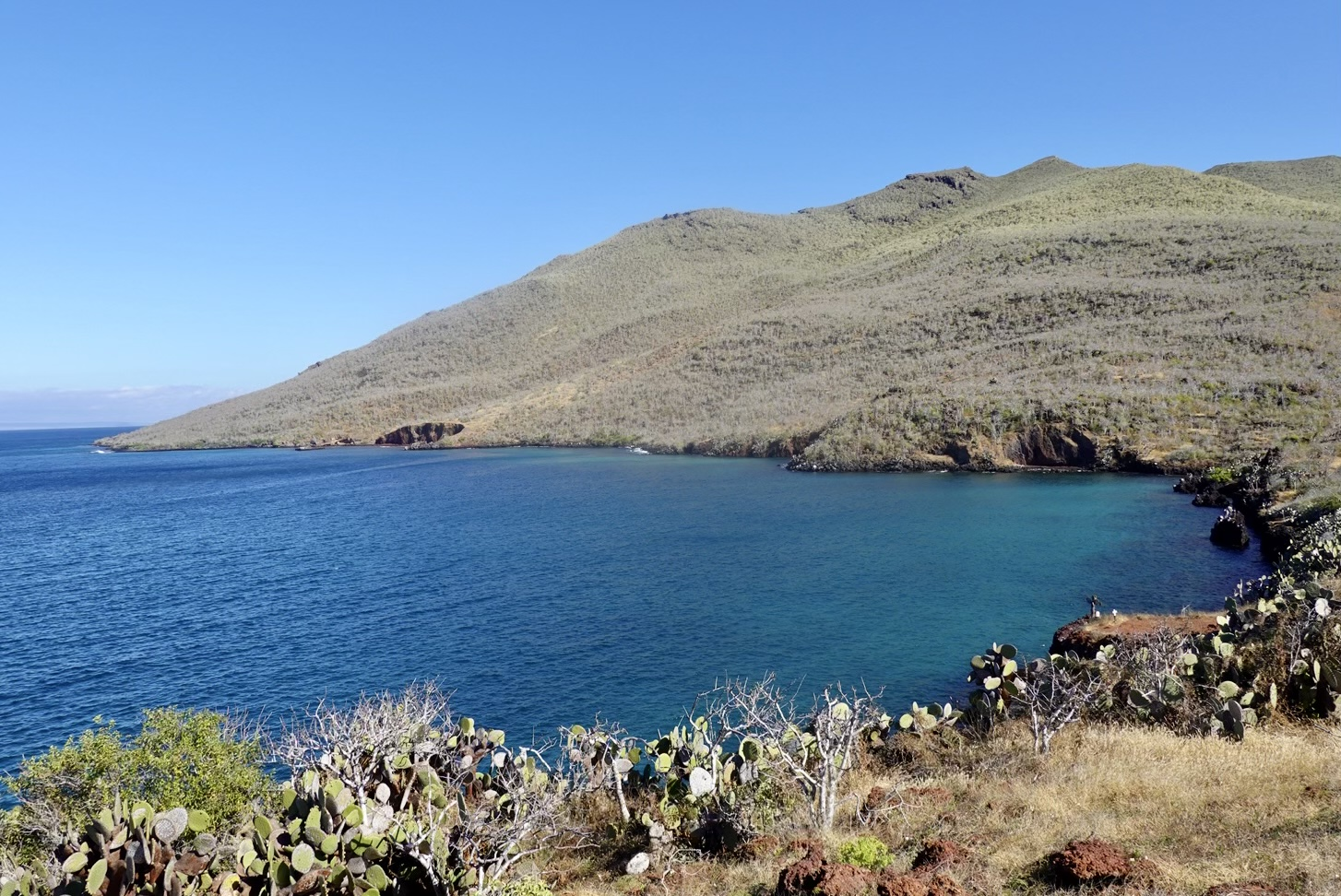
Cove on the northern side of Rábida Island.

Rábida or Rabida Island (Spanish: Isla Rábida) is one of the Galápagos Islands. It is 5 km^{2} (1.9 sq mi) in area.

== Names ==
Rábida ([ˈraβiða]) is the Spanish word for a ribat, a medieval Islamic guardpost used figuratively for Sufi monasteries and Islamic nunneries.

It was previously named Jervis Island (/ˈdʒɜːrvɪs, ˈdʒɑːr-/) by British captain James Colnett in 1793 in honor of John Jervis, the martinet admiral who later defeated the French Navy at Cape St. Vincent during the Napoleonic Wars.

== Geography ==
Rabida is one of the Galápagos Islands, located south of Santiago Island, northeast of Isabela Island, and northwest of Santa Cruz.

== Wildlife ==
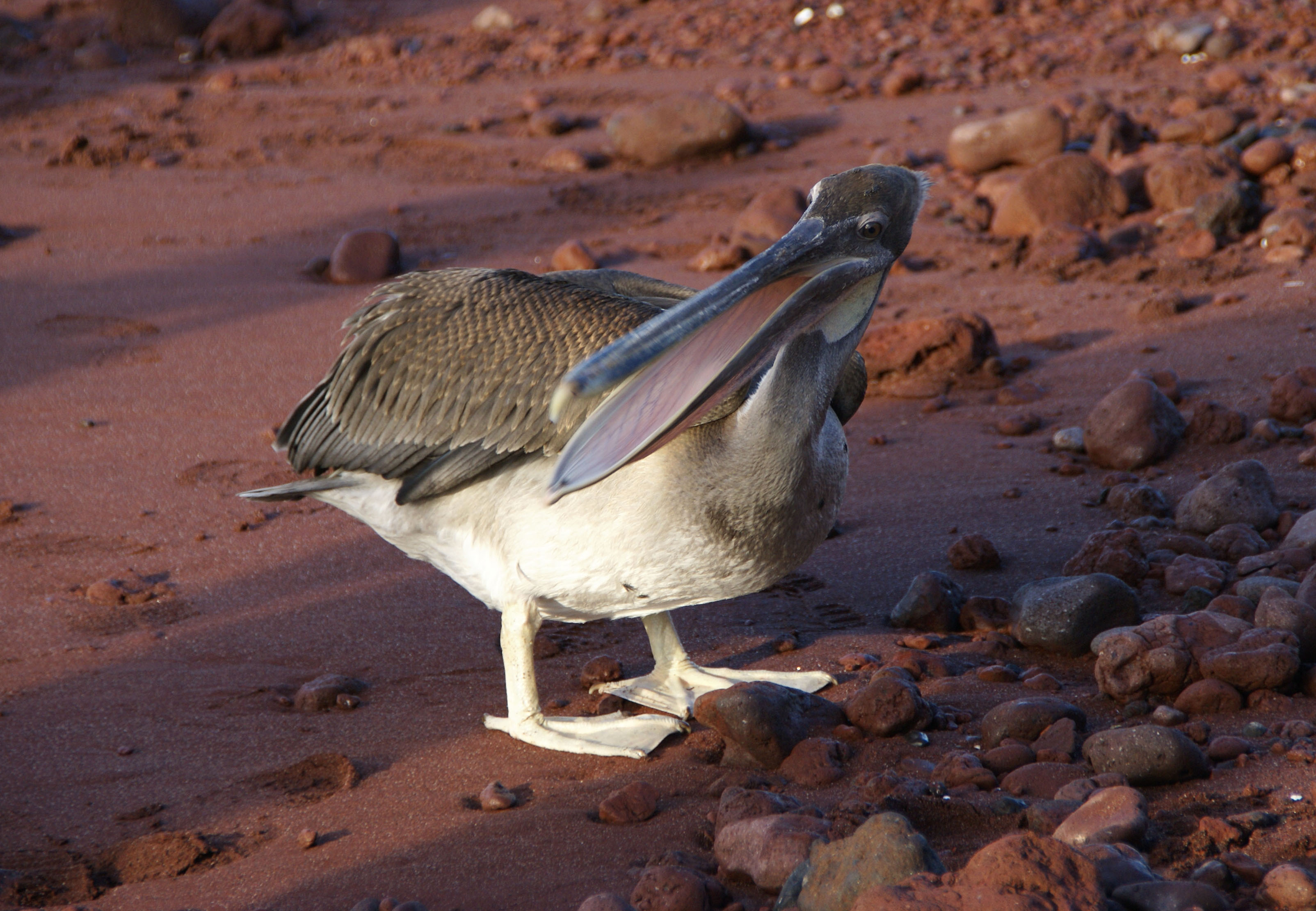
Brown pelican on red sand.

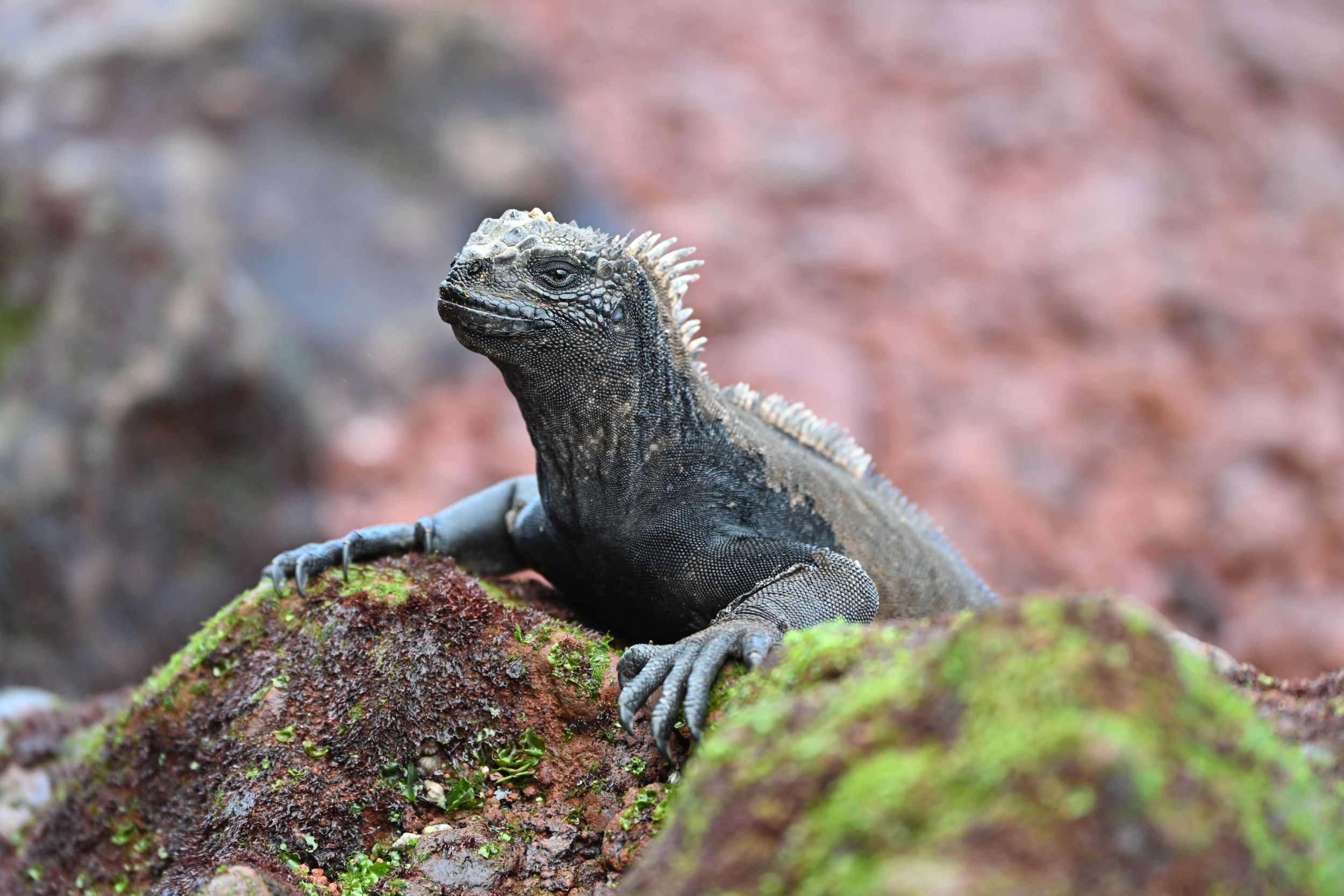
Marine iguana (Amblyrhynchus cristatus) on Rábida

In addition to flamingos and the bachelor sea lion colony, pelicans, white-cheeked pintails, boobies, and nine species of finch have been reported. The rich wildlife attracts a number of tourist cruises.

In 1971, the Galápagos National Park Service successfully eradicated goats from Rábida as this introduced species upset the natural environment and led to the extinction of several native creatures including geckos, land iguanas, and rice rats.

In January 2011, invasive rodents were removed from the island by the Galápagos National Park staff, assisted by Island Conservation to benefit Galapagos penguins and Scalesia stewartii (a tree-forming daisy and the plant equivalent of one of Darwin's finches).
