= E. portoricensis =

E. portoricensis may refer to:

- Eburia portoricensis, a longhorn beetle
- Elaver portoricensis, a sac spider
- Eleutherodactylus portoricensis, a frog native to Puerto Rico
- Emathis portoricensis, a jumping spider
- Emerita portoricensis, a sand crab
- Erioptera portoricensis, a crane fly
- Eurema portoricensis, a butterfly found in Puerto Rico
