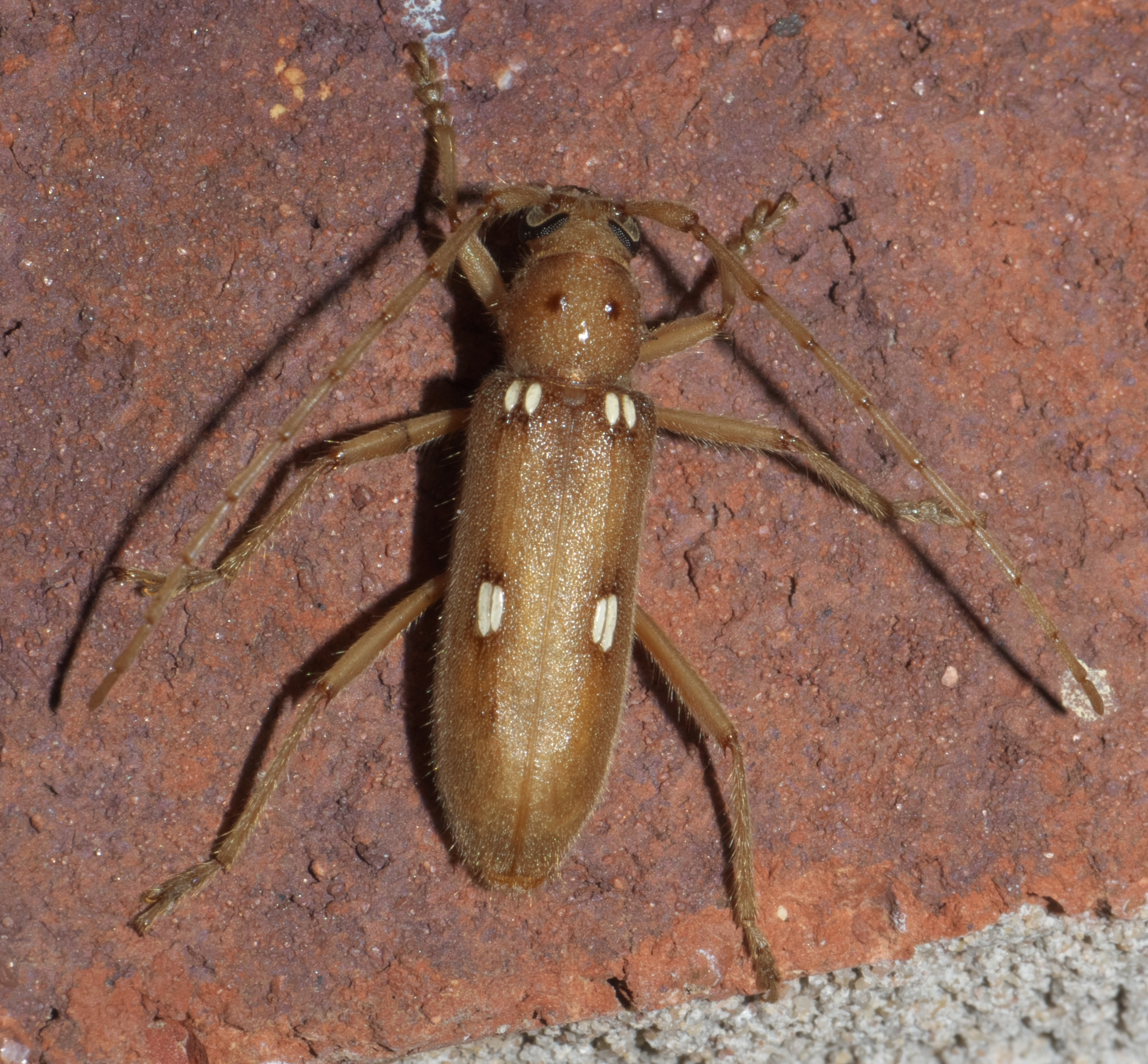
- Eburia haldemani

Scientific classification
- Kingdom: Animalia
- Phylum: Arthropoda
- Class: Insecta
- Order: Coleoptera
- Suborder: Polyphaga
- Infraorder: Cucujiformia
- Family: Cerambycidae
- Genus: Eburia
- Species: E. haldemani

Binomial name
- Eburia haldemani LeConte, 1851

= Eburia haldemani =

Species of beetle

Eburia haldemani is a species of long-horned beetle in the family Cerambycidae, which lives in Central and North America and is distinguished from the similar species Eburia quadrigeminata, the ivory marked beetle, by a lack of prominent spines at the elytra's apex and less elongated marks at its base.
