= Eburia poricollis =

Scientific classification
- Kingdom: Animalia
- Phylum: Arthropoda
- Clade: Pancrustacea
- Class: Insecta
- Order: Coleoptera
- Suborder: Polyphaga
- Infraorder: Cucujiformia
- Family: Cerambycidae
- Genus: Eburia
- Species: E. poricollis

Binomial name
- Eburia poricollis Chemsak & Linsley, 1973

Synonyms
- Susuacanga poricolle (Chemsak & Linsley, 1973)

Species of beetle

Eburia poricollis is a species of beetle in the family Cerambycidae. It has been found in Jalisco and Morelos regions of Mexico.
