= Eburia didyma =

Scientific classification
- Kingdom: Animalia
- Phylum: Arthropoda
- Clade: Pancrustacea
- Class: Insecta
- Order: Coleoptera
- Suborder: Polyphaga
- Infraorder: Cucujiformia
- Family: Cerambycidae
- Genus: Eburia
- Species: E. didyma

Binomial name
- Eburia didyma (Olivier, 1795)

Species of beetle

Eburia didyma is a species of beetle in the family Cerambycidae.
