= Eburia charmata =

Scientific classification
- Kingdom: Animalia
- Phylum: Arthropoda
- Class: Insecta
- Order: Coleoptera
- Suborder: Polyphaga
- Infraorder: Cucujiformia
- Family: Cerambycidae
- Genus: Eburia
- Species: E. charmata

Binomial name
- Eburia charmata Martins, 1981

Species of beetle

Eburia charmata is a species of beetle in the family Cerambycidae that is endemic to Brazil.
