= Eburia cinerea =

Scientific classification
- Kingdom: Animalia
- Phylum: Arthropoda
- Class: Insecta
- Order: Coleoptera
- Suborder: Polyphaga
- Infraorder: Cucujiformia
- Family: Cerambycidae
- Genus: Eburia
- Species: E. cinerea

Binomial name
- Eburia cinerea Franz, 1959

Species of beetle

Eburia cinerea is a species of beetle in the family Cerambycidae that is endemic to Peru.
