= Eburia bonairensis =

Scientific classification
- Domain: Eukaryota
- Kingdom: Animalia
- Phylum: Arthropoda
- Class: Insecta
- Order: Coleoptera
- Suborder: Polyphaga
- Infraorder: Cucujiformia
- Family: Cerambycidae
- Genus: Eburia
- Species: E. bonairensis

Binomial name
- Eburia bonairensis (Gilmour, 1968)

Species of beetle

Eburia bonairensis is a species of beetle in the family Cerambycidae, that is endemic to Suriname.
