= Eburia marginalis =

Scientific classification
- Kingdom: Animalia
- Phylum: Arthropoda
- Class: Insecta
- Order: Coleoptera
- Suborder: Polyphaga
- Infraorder: Cucujiformia
- Family: Cerambycidae
- Genus: Eburia
- Species: E. marginalis

Binomial name
- Eburia marginalis Fisher, 1947

Species of beetle

Eburia marginalis is a species of beetle in the family Cerambycidae.
