= Eburia patruelis =

Scientific classification
- Kingdom: Animalia
- Phylum: Arthropoda
- Clade: Pancrustacea
- Class: Insecta
- Order: Coleoptera
- Suborder: Polyphaga
- Infraorder: Cucujiformia
- Family: Cerambycidae
- Genus: Eburia
- Species: E. patruelis

Binomial name
- Eburia patruelis Bates, 1884

Species of beetle

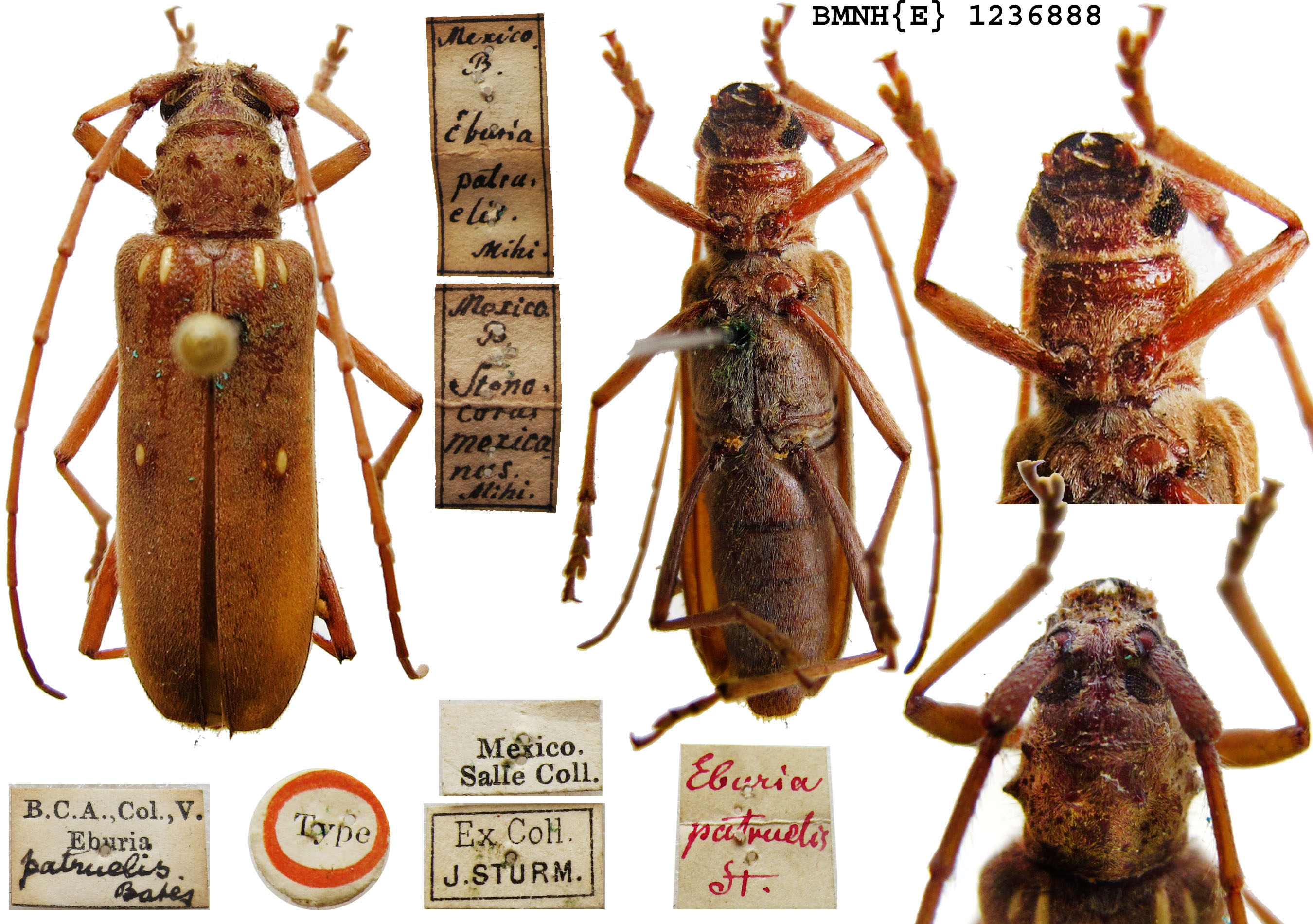

Eburia patruelis is a species of beetle in the family Cerambycidae. It lives in Northern Mexico and was named in 1884.
