= Eburia mutata =

Scientific classification
- Kingdom: Animalia
- Phylum: Arthropoda
- Class: Insecta
- Order: Coleoptera
- Suborder: Polyphaga
- Infraorder: Cucujiformia
- Family: Cerambycidae
- Genus: Eburia
- Species: E. mutata

Binomial name
- Eburia mutata Bates, 1884

Species of beetle

Eburia mutata is a species of beetle in the family Cerambycidae.
