= Eburia falli =

Scientific classification
- Kingdom: Animalia
- Phylum: Arthropoda
- Class: Insecta
- Order: Coleoptera
- Suborder: Polyphaga
- Infraorder: Cucujiformia
- Family: Cerambycidae
- Genus: Eburia
- Species: E. falli

Binomial name
- Eburia falli Linsley, 1940

Species of beetle

Eburia falli is a species of beetle in the family Cerambycidae.
