= Eburia semipubescens =

Scientific classification
- Kingdom: Animalia
- Phylum: Arthropoda
- Class: Insecta
- Order: Coleoptera
- Suborder: Polyphaga
- Infraorder: Cucujiformia
- Family: Cerambycidae
- Genus: Eburia
- Species: E. semipubescens

Binomial name
- Eburia semipubescens (Thomson, 1860)

Species of beetle

Eburia semipubescens is a species of beetle in the family Cerambycidae.
