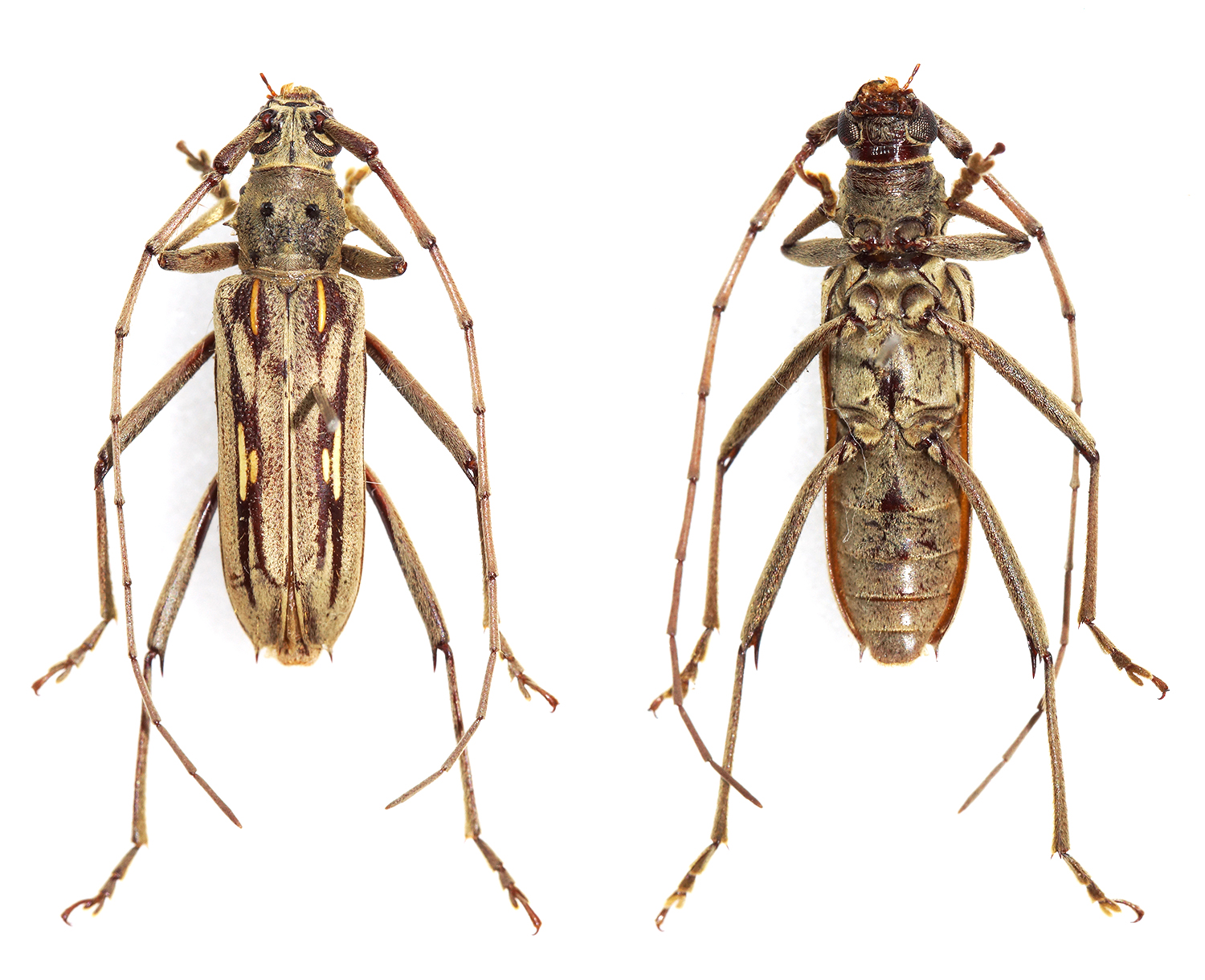

Scientific classification
- Kingdom: Animalia
- Phylum: Arthropoda
- Clade: Pancrustacea
- Class: Insecta
- Order: Coleoptera
- Suborder: Polyphaga
- Infraorder: Cucujiformia
- Family: Cerambycidae
- Genus: Eburia
- Species: E. stigma

Binomial name
- Eburia stigma (Olivier, 1795)

= Eburia stigma =

Species of beetle

Eburia stigma is a species of beetle in the family Cerambycidae.
