= Eburia velmae =

Scientific classification
- Kingdom: Animalia
- Phylum: Arthropoda
- Class: Insecta
- Order: Coleoptera
- Suborder: Polyphaga
- Infraorder: Cucujiformia
- Family: Cerambycidae
- Genus: Eburia
- Species: E. velmae

Binomial name
- Eburia velmae McCarty, 1993

Species of beetle

Eburia velmae is a species of beetle in the family Cerambycidae.
