= Eburia frankiei =

Scientific classification
- Kingdom: Animalia
- Phylum: Arthropoda
- Class: Insecta
- Order: Coleoptera
- Suborder: Polyphaga
- Infraorder: Cucujiformia
- Family: Cerambycidae
- Genus: Eburia
- Species: E. frankiei

Binomial name
- Eburia frankiei Noguera, 2002

Species of beetle

Eburia frankiei is a species of beetle in the family Cerambycidae.
