= Eburia postica =

Scientific classification
- Kingdom: Animalia
- Phylum: Arthropoda
- Clade: Pancrustacea
- Class: Insecta
- Order: Coleoptera
- Suborder: Polyphaga
- Infraorder: Cucujiformia
- Family: Cerambycidae
- Genus: Eburia
- Species: E. postica

Binomial name
- Eburia postica White, 1853

Species of beetle

Eburia postica is a species of longhorn beetle found in Jamaica.
