= Eburia brevicornis =

Scientific classification
- Kingdom: Animalia
- Phylum: Arthropoda
- Class: Insecta
- Order: Coleoptera
- Suborder: Polyphaga
- Infraorder: Cucujiformia
- Family: Cerambycidae
- Genus: Eburia
- Species: E. brevicornis

Binomial name
- Eburia brevicornis Chemsak & Linsley, 1973

Species of beetle

Eburia brevicornis is a species of beetle in the family Cerambycidae.
