= Eburia amabilis =

Scientific classification
- Domain: Eukaryota
- Kingdom: Animalia
- Phylum: Arthropoda
- Class: Insecta
- Order: Coleoptera
- Suborder: Polyphaga
- Infraorder: Cucujiformia
- Family: Cerambycidae
- Genus: Eburia
- Species: E. amabilis

Binomial name
- Eburia amabilis Boheman, 1859

Species of beetle

Eburia amabilis is a species of beetle in the family Cerambycidae found on the Galapagos Islands and in Panama.
