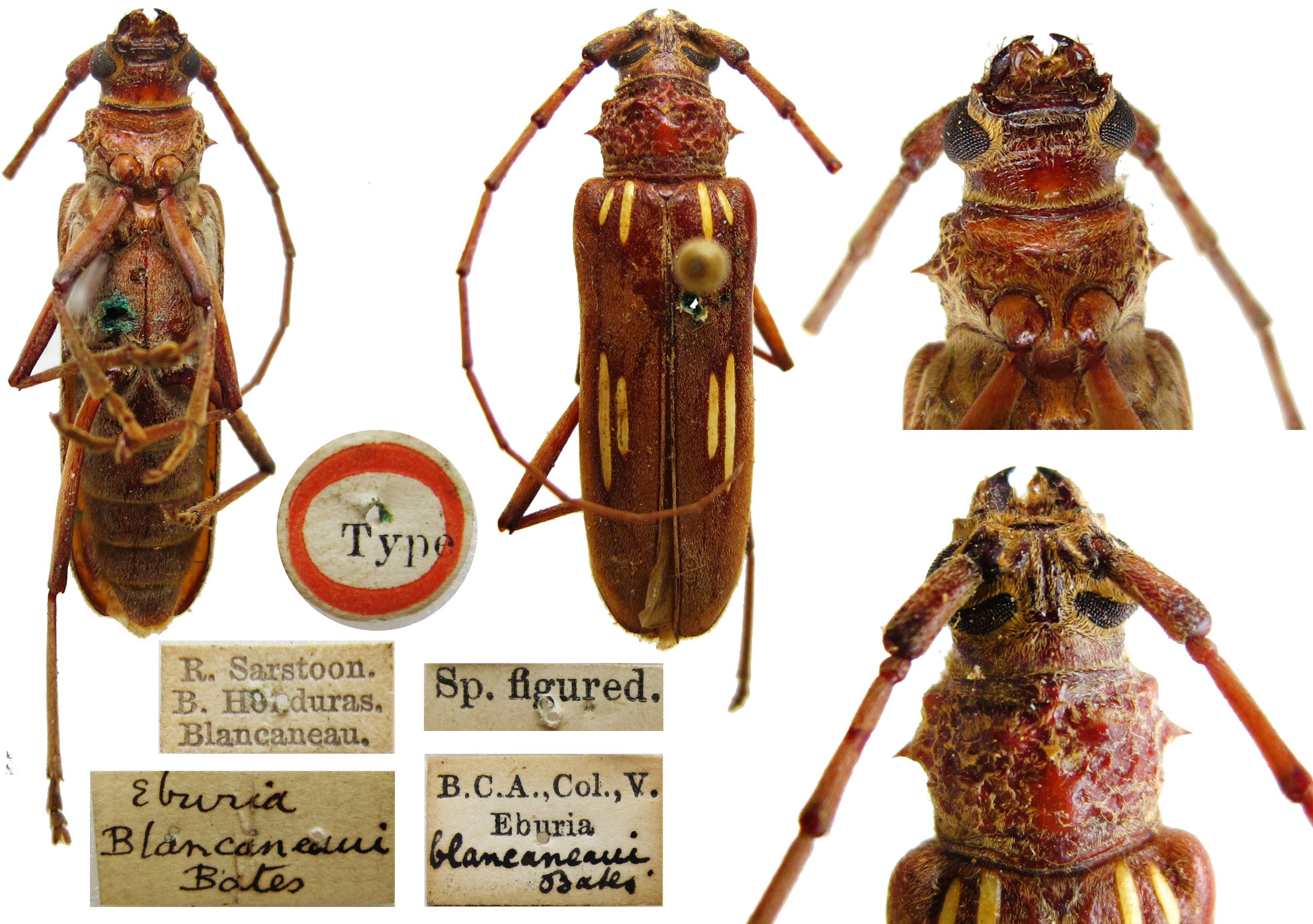
- Eburia blancaneaui

Scientific classification
- Domain: Eukaryota
- Kingdom: Animalia
- Phylum: Arthropoda
- Class: Insecta
- Order: Coleoptera
- Suborder: Polyphaga
- Infraorder: Cucujiformia
- Family: Cerambycidae
- Genus: Eburia
- Species: E. blancaneaui

Binomial name
- Eburia blancaneaui Bates, 1880

= Eburia blancaneaui =

Species of beetle

Eburia blancaneaui is a species of beetle in the family Cerambycidae found in Belize, El Salvador, Guatemala, Honduras and Mexico.
