= Eburia concisispinis =

Scientific classification
- Kingdom: Animalia
- Phylum: Arthropoda
- Class: Insecta
- Order: Coleoptera
- Suborder: Polyphaga
- Infraorder: Cucujiformia
- Family: Cerambycidae
- Genus: Eburia
- Species: E. concisispinis

Binomial name
- Eburia concisispinis Fisher, 1941

Species of beetle

Eburia concisispinis is a species of beetle in the family Cerambycidae.
