= Eburia brunneicomis =

Scientific classification
- Domain: Eukaryota
- Kingdom: Animalia
- Phylum: Arthropoda
- Class: Insecta
- Order: Coleoptera
- Suborder: Polyphaga
- Infraorder: Cucujiformia
- Family: Cerambycidae
- Genus: Eburia
- Species: E. brunneicomis

Binomial name
- Eburia brunneicomis Chemsak & Linsley, 1973

Species of beetle

Eburia brunneicomis is a species of beetle in the family Cerambycidae, that can be found in Belize, Guatemala and Mexico.
