= Eburia baroni =

Scientific classification
- Domain: Eukaryota
- Kingdom: Animalia
- Phylum: Arthropoda
- Class: Insecta
- Order: Coleoptera
- Suborder: Polyphaga
- Infraorder: Cucujiformia
- Family: Cerambycidae
- Genus: Eburia
- Species: E. baroni

Binomial name
- Eburia baroni Bates, 1892

Species of beetle

Eburia baroni is a species of beetle in the family Cerambycidae that is endemic to Mexico.
