= Eburia perezi =

Scientific classification
- Kingdom: Animalia
- Phylum: Arthropoda
- Class: Insecta
- Order: Coleoptera
- Suborder: Polyphaga
- Infraorder: Cucujiformia
- Family: Cerambycidae
- Genus: Eburia
- Species: E. perezi

Binomial name
- Eburia perezi Chemsak & Giesbert, 1986

Species of beetle

Eburia perezi is a species of beetle in the family Cerambycidae.
