= Eburia pseudostigma =

Scientific classification
- Kingdom: Animalia
- Phylum: Arthropoda
- Class: Insecta
- Order: Coleoptera
- Suborder: Polyphaga
- Infraorder: Cucujiformia
- Family: Cerambycidae
- Genus: Eburia
- Species: E. pseudostigma

Binomial name
- Eburia pseudostigma Lingafelter & Nearns, 2007

Species of beetle

Eburia pseudostigma is a species of beetle in the family Cerambycidae.
