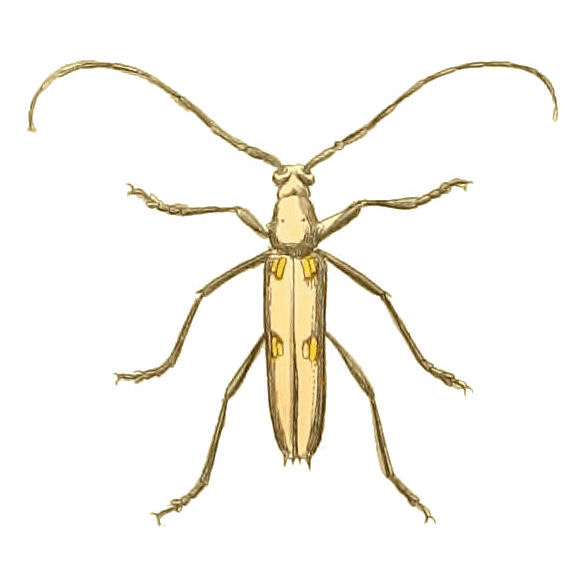
- Eburia quadrimaculata

Scientific classification
- Kingdom: Animalia
- Phylum: Arthropoda
- Class: Insecta
- Order: Coleoptera
- Suborder: Polyphaga
- Infraorder: Cucujiformia
- Family: Cerambycidae
- Genus: Eburia
- Species: E. quadrimaculata

Binomial name
- Eburia quadrimaculata (Linnaeus, 1767)

= Eburia quadrimaculata =

Species of beetle

Eburia quadrimaculata is a species of beetle in the family Cerambycidae.

== Description ==
Head pale clay-coloured. Antennæ (being the length of the insect) of a redder colour, and at their bases almost surrounded by the eyes. Thorax of the same colour as the head, very cylindrical; having a sharp spine on each side, and two short black ones on the top. Scutellum small, and semi-oval. Elytra pale clay-coloured, having on each two spines at the tip of each, the inner one being the smaller; and having also four oblong yellow spots, two placed at the middle and two at the base. Each of these spots appears to be composed of a large and a small one joined close together; the largest (in the upper spots) being the inner one, and in the lower spots being the outer one. Abdomen and legs of the same colour as the head, &c.; the four posterior femora with two small spines at the tips. Length about 1 inch.
