= Eburia cinereopilosa =

Scientific classification
- Domain: Eukaryota
- Kingdom: Animalia
- Phylum: Arthropoda
- Class: Insecta
- Order: Coleoptera
- Suborder: Polyphaga
- Infraorder: Cucujiformia
- Family: Cerambycidae
- Genus: Eburia
- Species: E. cinereopilosa

Binomial name
- Eburia cinereopilosa Fisher, 1932

Species of beetle

Eburia cinereopilosa is a species of beetle in the family Cerambycidae found on Cuba and in the United States.
