= Eburia ulkei =

Scientific classification
- Kingdom: Animalia
- Phylum: Arthropoda
- Class: Insecta
- Order: Coleoptera
- Suborder: Polyphaga
- Infraorder: Cucujiformia
- Family: Cerambycidae
- Genus: Eburia
- Species: E. ulkei

Binomial name
- Eburia ulkei Bland, 1862

Synonyms
- Susuacanga ulkei (Bland, 1862)

Species of beetle

Eburia ulkei is a species of beetle in the family Cerambycidae.
