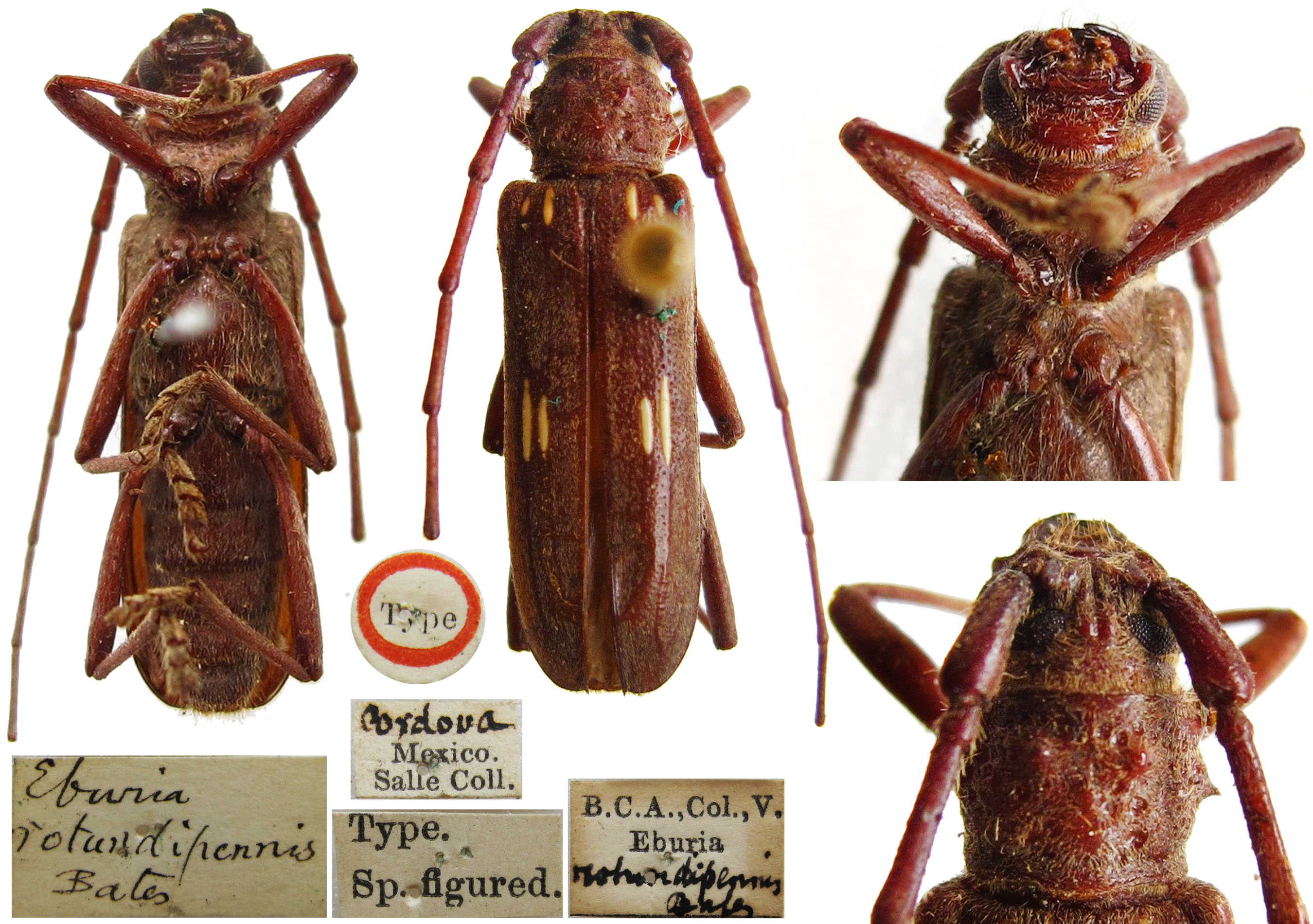
- Eburia rotundipennis

Scientific classification
- Kingdom: Animalia
- Phylum: Arthropoda
- Class: Insecta
- Order: Coleoptera
- Suborder: Polyphaga
- Infraorder: Cucujiformia
- Family: Cerambycidae
- Genus: Eburia
- Species: E. rotundipennis

Binomial name
- Eburia rotundipennis Bates, 1884

Synonyms
- Susuacanga rotundipenne (Bates, 1884)

= Eburia rotundipennis =

Species of beetle

Eburia rotundipennis is a species of beetle in the family Cerambycidae.
