= Eburia rufobrunnea =

Scientific classification
- Kingdom: Animalia
- Phylum: Arthropoda
- Class: Insecta
- Order: Coleoptera
- Suborder: Polyphaga
- Infraorder: Cucujiformia
- Family: Cerambycidae
- Genus: Eburia
- Species: E. rufobrunnea

Binomial name
- Eburia rufobrunnea Perroud, 1855

Species of beetle

Eburia rufobrunnea is a species of beetle in the family Cerambycidae.
