= Eburia wappesi =

Scientific classification
- Kingdom: Animalia
- Phylum: Arthropoda
- Class: Insecta
- Order: Coleoptera
- Suborder: Polyphaga
- Infraorder: Cucujiformia
- Family: Cerambycidae
- Genus: Eburia
- Species: E. wappesi

Binomial name
- Eburia wappesi Noguera, 2002

Synonyms
- Susuacanga wappesi (Noguera, 2002)

Species of beetle

Eburia wappesi is a species of beetle in the family Cerambycidae.
