= Eburia championi =

Scientific classification
- Domain: Eukaryota
- Kingdom: Animalia
- Phylum: Arthropoda
- Class: Insecta
- Order: Coleoptera
- Suborder: Polyphaga
- Infraorder: Cucujiformia
- Family: Cerambycidae
- Genus: Eburia
- Species: E. championi

Binomial name
- Eburia championi Bates, 1880

Species of beetle

Eburia championi is a species of beetle in the family Cerambycidae, that can be found in Costa Rica and Mexico.
