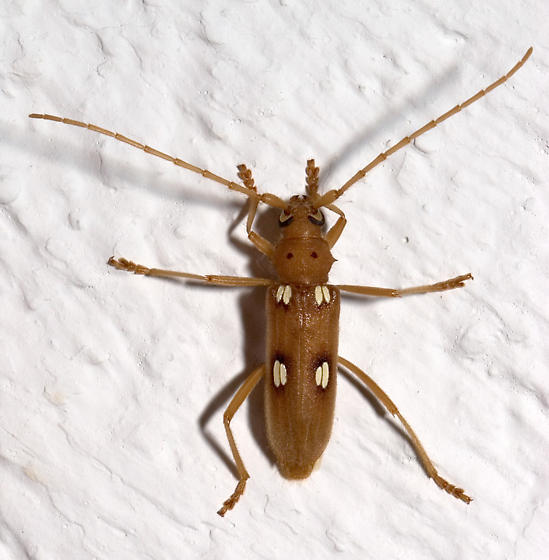
- Eburia quadrigeminata

Scientific classification
- Domain: Eukaryota
- Kingdom: Animalia
- Phylum: Arthropoda
- Class: Insecta
- Order: Coleoptera
- Suborder: Polyphaga
- Infraorder: Cucujiformia
- Family: Cerambycidae
- Subfamily: Cerambycinae
- Tribe: Eburiini
- Genus: Eburia; Lacordaire, 1830

= Eburia =

Genus of beetles

Eburia is a genus of beetles in the family Cerambycidae.

== List of species ==
- Eburia aegrota Bates, 1880
- Eburia albolineata Fisher, 1944
- Eburia aliciae Noguera, 2002
- Eburia amabilis Boheman, 1859
- Eburia bahamicae Fisher, 1932
- Eburia baroni Bates, 1892
- Eburia bimaculata Aurivillius, 1912
- Eburia blancaneaui Bates, 1880
- Eburia bonairensis Gilmour, 1968
- Eburia brevicornis Chemsak & Linsley, 1973
- Eburia brevispinis Bates, 1880
- Eburia brunneicomis Chemsak & Linsley, 1973
- Eburia cacapyra Martins, 1999
- Eburia caymanensis Fisher, 1941
- Eburia championi Bates, 1880
- Eburia charmata Martins, 1981
- Eburia chemsaki Noguera, 2002
- Eburia cinerea Franz, 1959
- Eburia cinereopilosa Fisher, 1932
- Eburia cinnamomea Fleutiaux & Sallé, 1889
- Eburia clara Bates, 1884
- Eburia concisispinis Fisher, 1941
- Eburia confusa Zayas, 1975
- Eburia consobrina Jacquelin du Val in Sagra, 1857
- Eburia consobrinoides Vitali, 2007
- Eburia copei Noguera, 2002
- Eburia crinitus Noguera, 2002
- Eburia cruciata (Linsley, 1935)
- Eburia cubae Fisher, 1932
- Eburia decemmaculata (Fabricius, 1775)
- Eburia dejeani Gahan, 1895
- Eburia didyma (Olivier, 1795)
- Eburia distincta Haldeman, 1847
- Eburia elegans Chemsak & Linsley, 1973
- Eburia elongata Fisher, 1932
- Eburia falli Linsley, 1940
- Eburia fisheri Russo, 1930
- Eburia frankiei Noguera, 2002
- Eburia fuliginea (Bates, 1872)
- Eburia giesberti Noguera, 2002
- Eburia haldemani LeConte, 1851
- Eburia hatsueae Chemsak & Giesbert, 1986
- Eburia hovorei Noguera, 2002
- Eburia inarmata Chemsak & Linsley, 1973
- Eburia inermis (Fleutiaux & Sallé, 1889)
- Eburia insulana Gahan, 1895
- Eburia jamaicae Fisher, 1942
- Eburia juanitae Chemsak & Linsley, 1970
- Eburia lanigera Linell, 1898
- Eburia laticollis Bates, 1880
- Eburia latispina Chemsak & Linsley, 1973
- Eburia lewisi Fisher, 1948
- Eburia linsleyi Lacey, 1949
- Eburia longicornis Fisher, 1932
- Eburia maccartyi Noguera, 2002
- Eburia macrotaenia Bates, 1880
- Eburia marginalis Fisher, 1947
- Eburia mutata Bates, 1884
- Eburia mutica LeConte, 1853
- Eburia nigrovittata Bates, 1884
- Eburia octomaculata Chevrolat, 1862
- Eburia opaca Chemsak & Linsley, 1973
- Eburia ovicollis LeConte, 1873
- Eburia paraegrota Chemsak & Linsley, 1973
- Eburia patruelis Bates, 1884
- Eburia pedestris White, 1853
- Eburia pellacia Zayas, 1975
- Eburia perezi Chemsak & Giesbert, 1986
- Eburia pilosa (Erichson in Meyens, 1834)
- Eburia pinarensis Zayas, 1975
- Eburia poricollis Chemsak & Linsley, 1973
- Eburia portoricensis Fisher, 1932
- Eburia porulosa Bates, 1892
- Eburia postica White, 1853
- Eburia powelli Chemsak & Linsley, 1970
- Eburia pseudostigma Lingafelter & Nearns, 2007
- Eburia quadrigeminata (Say, 1826)
- Eburia quadrimaculata (Linnaeus, 1767)
- Eburia quadrinotata (Latreille, 1811)
- Eburia ramsdeni Fisher, 1932
- Eburia ribardoi Noguera, 2002
- Eburia rotundipennis Bates, 1884
- Eburia rufobrunnea Perroud, 1855
- Eburia schusteri Giesbert, 1993
- Eburia semipubescens (Thomson, 1860)
- Eburia sericea Sallé, 1855
- Eburia sexnotata Boheman, 1859
- Eburia sordida Burmeister, 1865
- Eburia stigma (Olivier, 1795)
- Eburia stigmatica Chevrolat, 1834
- Eburia stroheckeri Knull, 1949
- Eburia submutata Chemsak & Linsley, 1973
- Eburia terroni Noguera, 2002
- Eburia tetrastalacta White, 1853
- Eburia thoracica White, 1853
- Eburia ulkei Bland, 1862
- Eburia velmae McCarty, 1993
- Eburia wappesi Noguera, 2002
