= Eburia brevispinis =

Scientific classification
- Domain: Eukaryota
- Kingdom: Animalia
- Phylum: Arthropoda
- Class: Insecta
- Order: Coleoptera
- Suborder: Polyphaga
- Infraorder: Cucujiformia
- Family: Cerambycidae
- Genus: Eburia
- Species: E. brevispinis

Binomial name
- Eburia brevispinis (Bates, 1880)

Synonyms
- Eburia affluens Chemsak & Linsley, 1973

Species of beetle

Eburia brevispinis is a species of beetle in the family Cerambycidae, that can be found in Guatemala, Mexico and Nicaragua.
