= Eburia cacapyra =

Scientific classification
- Domain: Eukaryota
- Kingdom: Animalia
- Phylum: Arthropoda
- Class: Insecta
- Order: Coleoptera
- Suborder: Polyphaga
- Infraorder: Cucujiformia
- Family: Cerambycidae
- Genus: Eburia
- Species: E. cacapyra

Binomial name
- Eburia cacapyra Martins, 1999

Species of beetle

Eburia cacapyra is a species of beetle in the family Cerambycidae found in Ecuador.
