= Eburia aliciae =

Scientific classification
- Domain: Eukaryota
- Kingdom: Animalia
- Phylum: Arthropoda
- Class: Insecta
- Order: Coleoptera
- Suborder: Polyphaga
- Infraorder: Cucujiformia
- Family: Cerambycidae
- Genus: Eburia
- Species: E. aliciae

Binomial name
- Eburia aliciae Noguera, 2002

Species of beetle

Eburia aliciae is a species of beetle in the family Cerambycidae, that can be found in Mexico.
