= Eburia aegrota =

Scientific classification
- Domain: Eukaryota
- Kingdom: Animalia
- Phylum: Arthropoda
- Class: Insecta
- Order: Coleoptera
- Suborder: Polyphaga
- Infraorder: Cucujiformia
- Family: Cerambycidae
- Genus: Eburia
- Species: E. aegrota

Binomial name
- Eburia aegrota (Bates, 1880)

Species of beetle

Eburia aegrota is a species of beetle in the family Cerambycidae, that can be found in Mexico and Nicaragua.
