= Eburia cinnamomea =

Scientific classification
- Kingdom: Animalia
- Phylum: Arthropoda
- Class: Insecta
- Order: Coleoptera
- Suborder: Polyphaga
- Infraorder: Cucujiformia
- Family: Cerambycidae
- Genus: Eburia
- Species: E. cinnamomea

Binomial name
- Eburia cinnamomea Fleutiaux & Sallé, 1889

Species of beetle

Eburia cinnamomea is a species of beetle in the family Cerambycidae.
