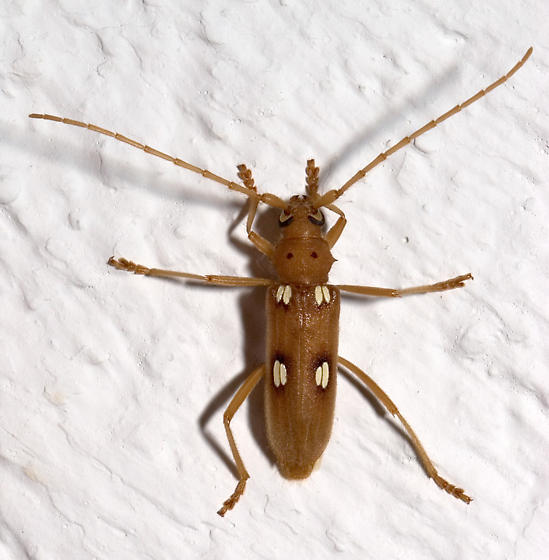

Scientific classification
- Kingdom: Animalia
- Phylum: Arthropoda
- Clade: Pancrustacea
- Class: Insecta
- Order: Coleoptera
- Suborder: Polyphaga
- Infraorder: Cucujiformia
- Family: Cerambycidae
- Genus: Eburia
- Species: E. quadrigeminata

Binomial name
- Eburia quadrigeminata (Say, 1826)

= Eburia quadrigeminata =

Species of beetle

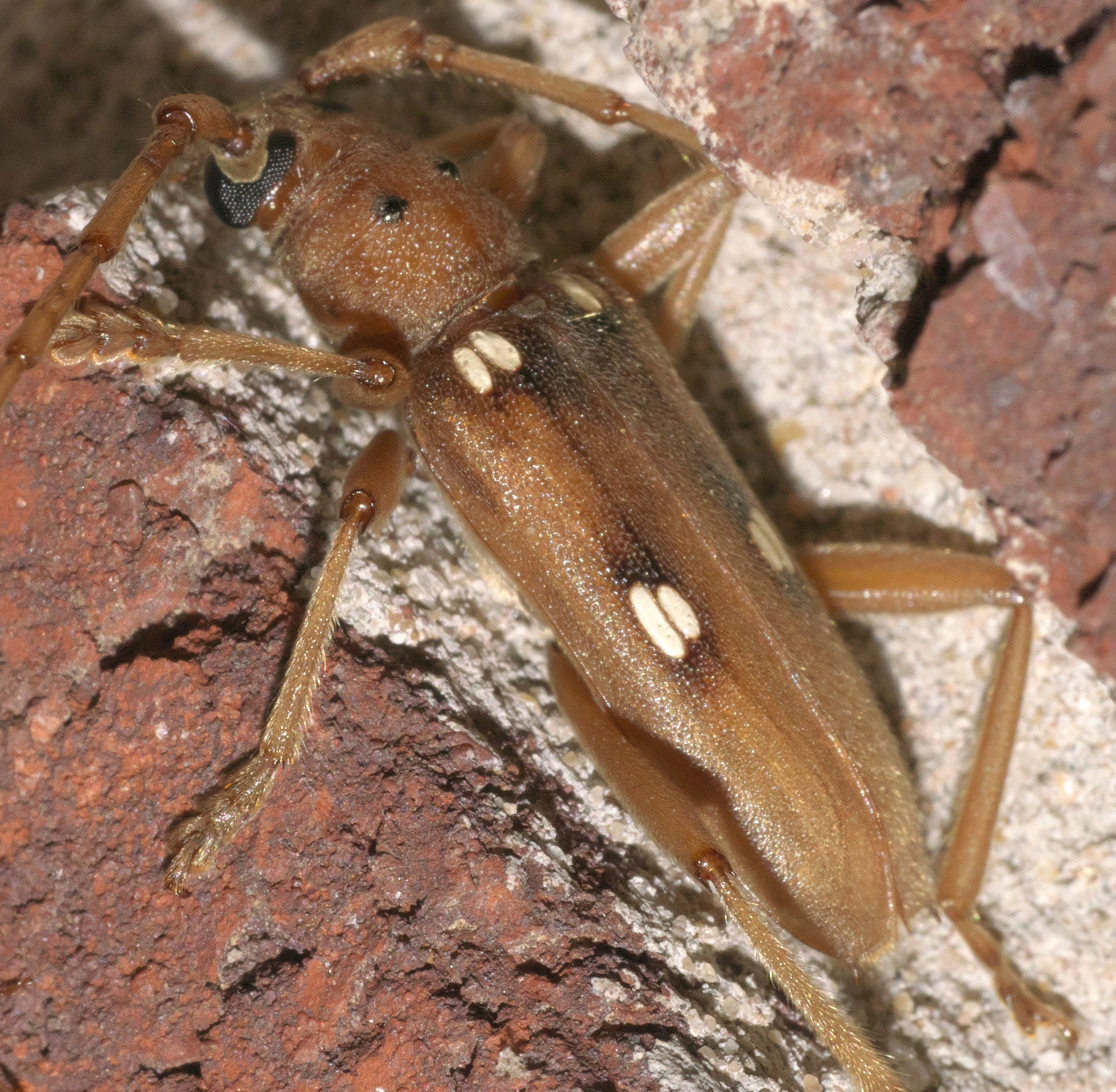
Eburia quadrigeminata, with elytral spines

Eburia quadrigeminata, the ivory-marked beetle or ivory-marked borer, is a species of North American beetle in the family Cerambycidae. Adult beetles are 12–25 millimetres (0.47–0.98 in) in length and their larvae feed on old hardwood, including timber, that is in good condition (not rotting).
