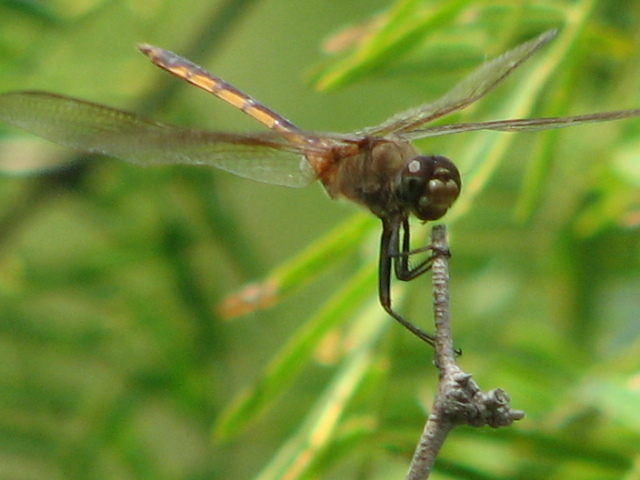
- Brachymesia herbida, tawny pennant, Texas

Scientific classification
- Kingdom: Animalia
- Phylum: Arthropoda
- Clade: Pancrustacea
- Class: Insecta
- Order: Odonata
- Infraorder: Anisoptera
- Superfamily: Libelluloidea
- Family: Libellulidae
- Genus: Brachymesia; Kirby, 1889

= Brachymesia =

Genus of dragonflies

Brachymesia is a genus of dragonflies in the family Libellulidae. They are commonly known as tropical pennants.

One species, B. gravida is confined to the United States. The others occur over much of South America, the West Indies and southern USA states.

== Species ==
The genus contains the following species:

Male	Female	Scientific name	Common name	Distribution
		Brachymesia furcata (Hagen, 1861)	red-tailed pennant	North America
		Brachymesia gravida (Calvert, 1890)	four-spotted pennant	North America.
		Brachymesia herbida (Gundlach, 1889)	tawny pennant	the Caribbean Sea, Central America, North America, and South America.
