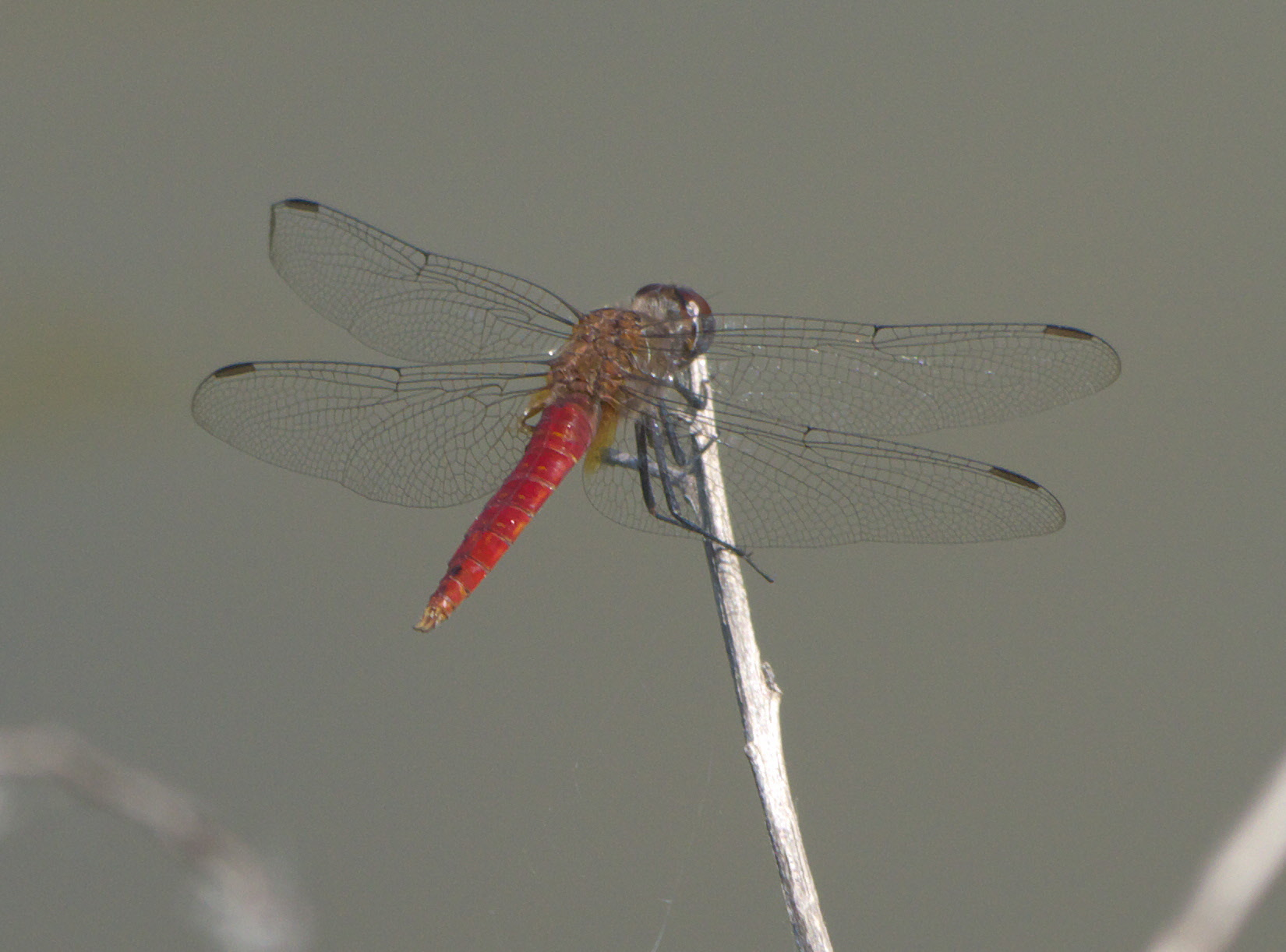

Conservation status
- Least Concern (IUCN 3.1)

Scientific classification
- Kingdom: Animalia
- Phylum: Arthropoda
- Clade: Pancrustacea
- Class: Insecta
- Order: Odonata
- Suborder: Anisoptera
- Superfamily: Libelluloidea
- Family: Libellulidae
- Genus: Brachymesia
- Species: B. furcata

Binomial name
- Brachymesia furcata (Hagen, 1861)

= Brachymesia furcata =

Species of dragonfly

Brachymesia furcata, commonly known as the red-tailed pennant, is part of the dragonfly order Odonata. It is a species of skimmer belonging to Libellulidae, one of the largest dragonfly families in the world. Along with Brachymesia gravida and B. herbida, two closely related species within the same genus, B. furcata is often found in semi-aquatic habitats distributed throughout the Caribbean, the Americas, Argentina, West India, Mexico, and Puerto Rico. Current populations of B. furcata are stable. The IUCN conservation status of B. furcata designates the species as "least concern" as last reviewed in 2017.

== Life cycle and habitat ==
Similar to other dragonflies, B. furcata has a life cycle consisting of three primary stages: egg, nymph, and adult. Its eggs are laid in still-water conditions on submerged aquatic plants or directly into the water depending on the environmental conditions. Marshes, ponds, lakes, and other mildly saline aquatic habitats are all potential locations for dragonflies to colonize. Bottom debris and aquatic vegetation provide both sustenance as well as hiding spots for the newly hatched dragonfly nymphs. After undergoing a few molts, the nymph transitions to adulthood. As an adult, B. furcata still inhabits a semi-aquatic environment where it feeds on small flying insects such as flies or mosquitoes. Generation time for an entire life cycle is known to be fast but exact intervals are likely to depend on the specific local environmental setting.

== Appearance ==
=== Egg stage ===
An adult female dragonfly can lay up to hundreds of eggs in batches within its lifetime. The eggs of B. furcata appear elongate and are encased in a jelly-like substance.

=== Nymph stage ===
Freshly hatched nymphs live in subaquatic habitats until they become adult dragonflies. Their physical appearances differ greatly from their adult forms starting from the obvious lack of wings. Nymphs have six long legs, which help them navigate their underwater environment. They have compound eyes and a rounded head that is nearly as wide as their thorax. Nymphs of all dragonfly species in the genus Brachymesia look nearly identical.

=== Adult stage ===
Adult dragonflies have contiguous eyes and four separate wings. Compared to their nymph form, adults have a thinner abdomen that is slightly thicker around the thorax. As implied by their common name, B. furcata adults have an obviously red tail that distinguishes them from other dragonflies within the same genus.

== Environmental concerns ==
Although B. furcata is relatively safe from extinction, populations are affected by anthropogenic interference. Ivermectin, a medication used to treat cattle parasites, was found in detectable concentrations within B. furcata larvae along the Parana Medio River. Adverse effects on the species have yet to be observed.

== Gallery ==
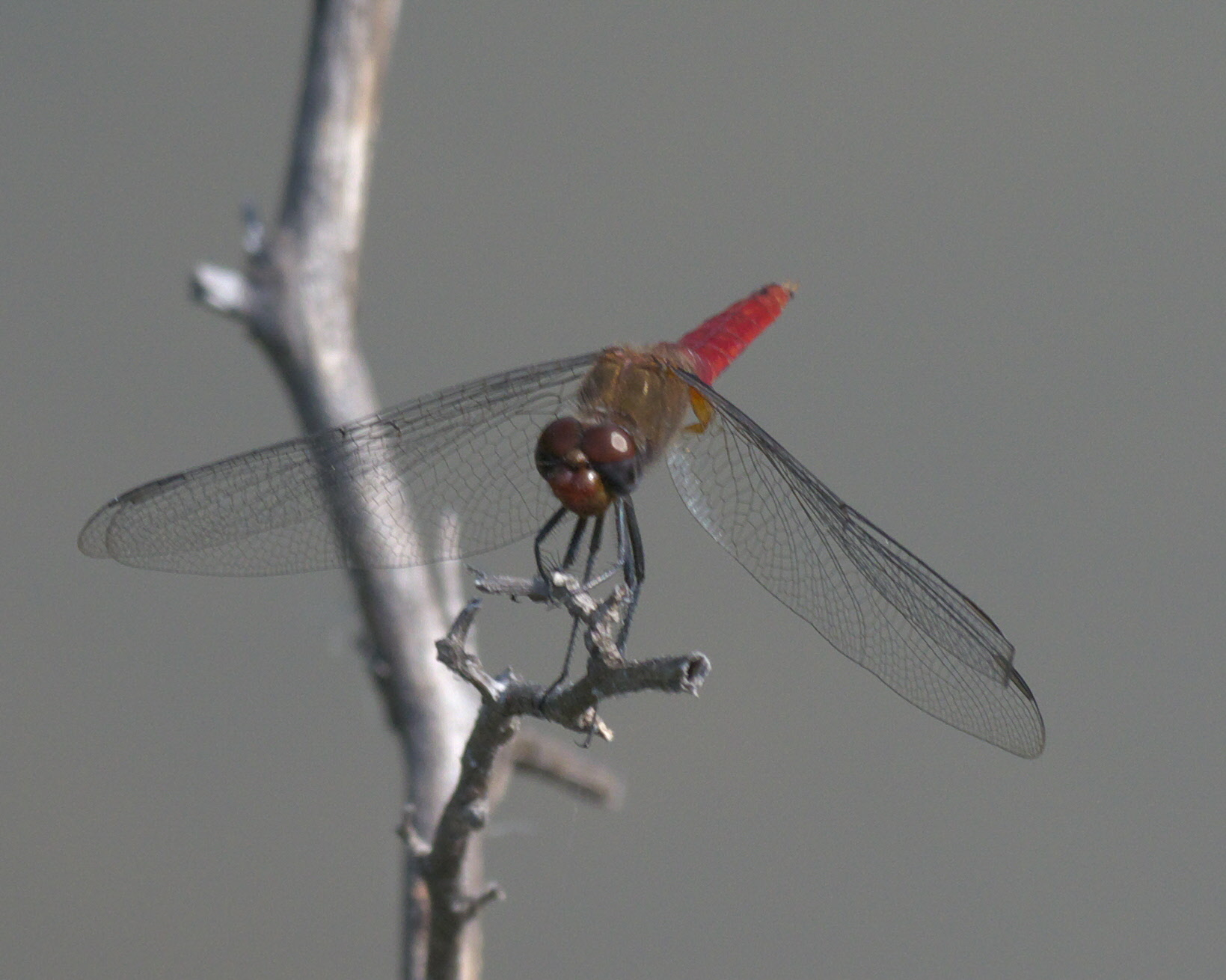

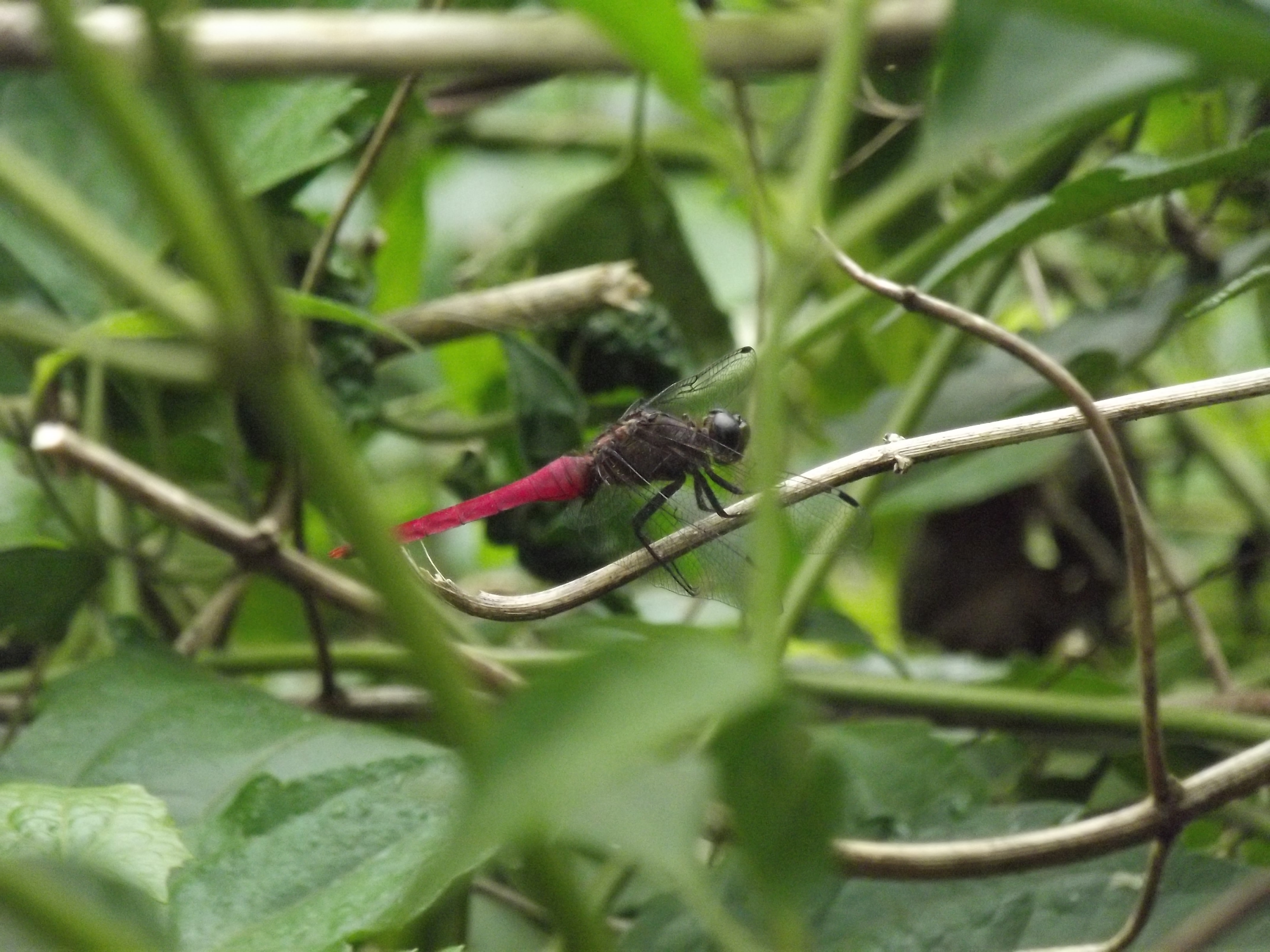

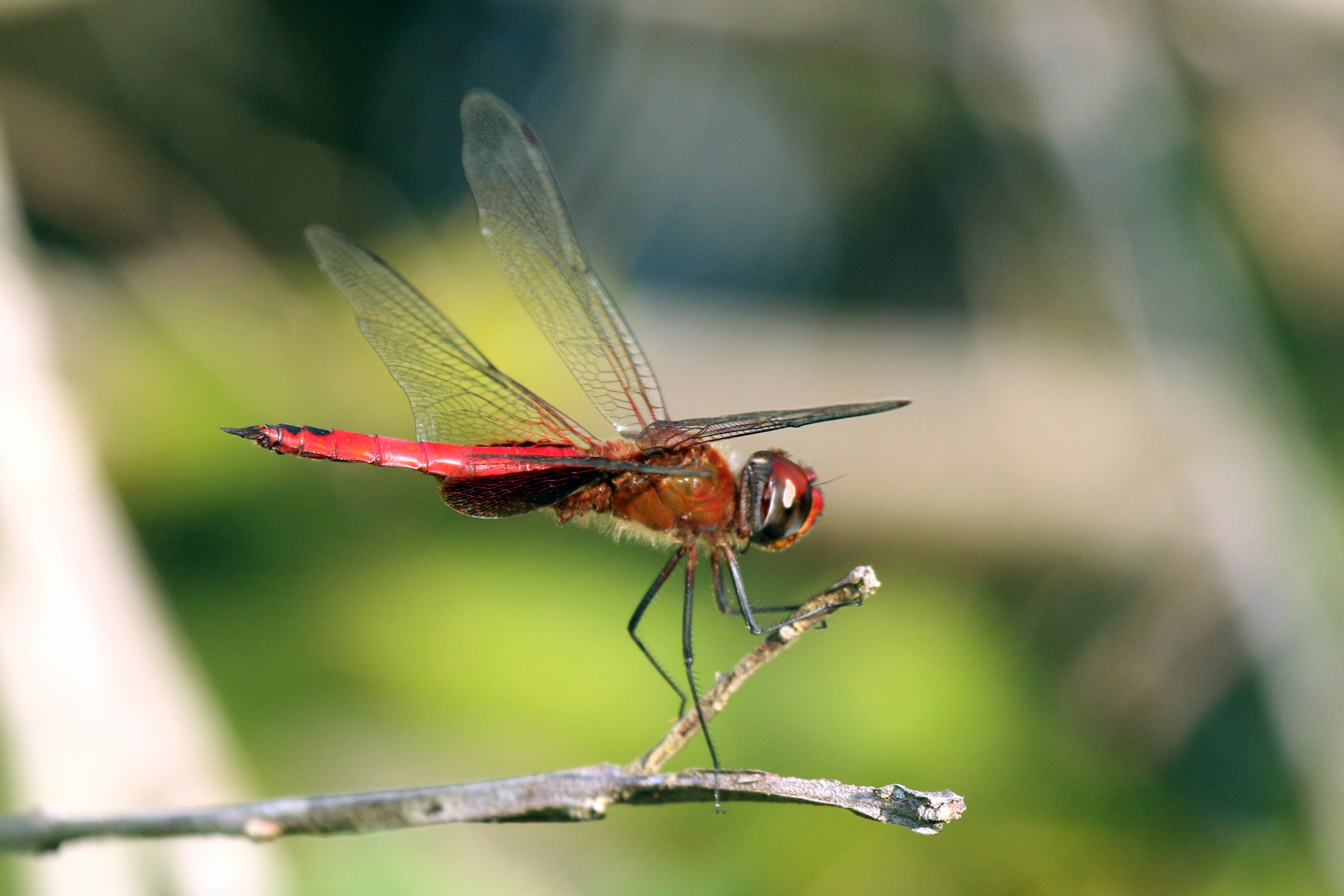
