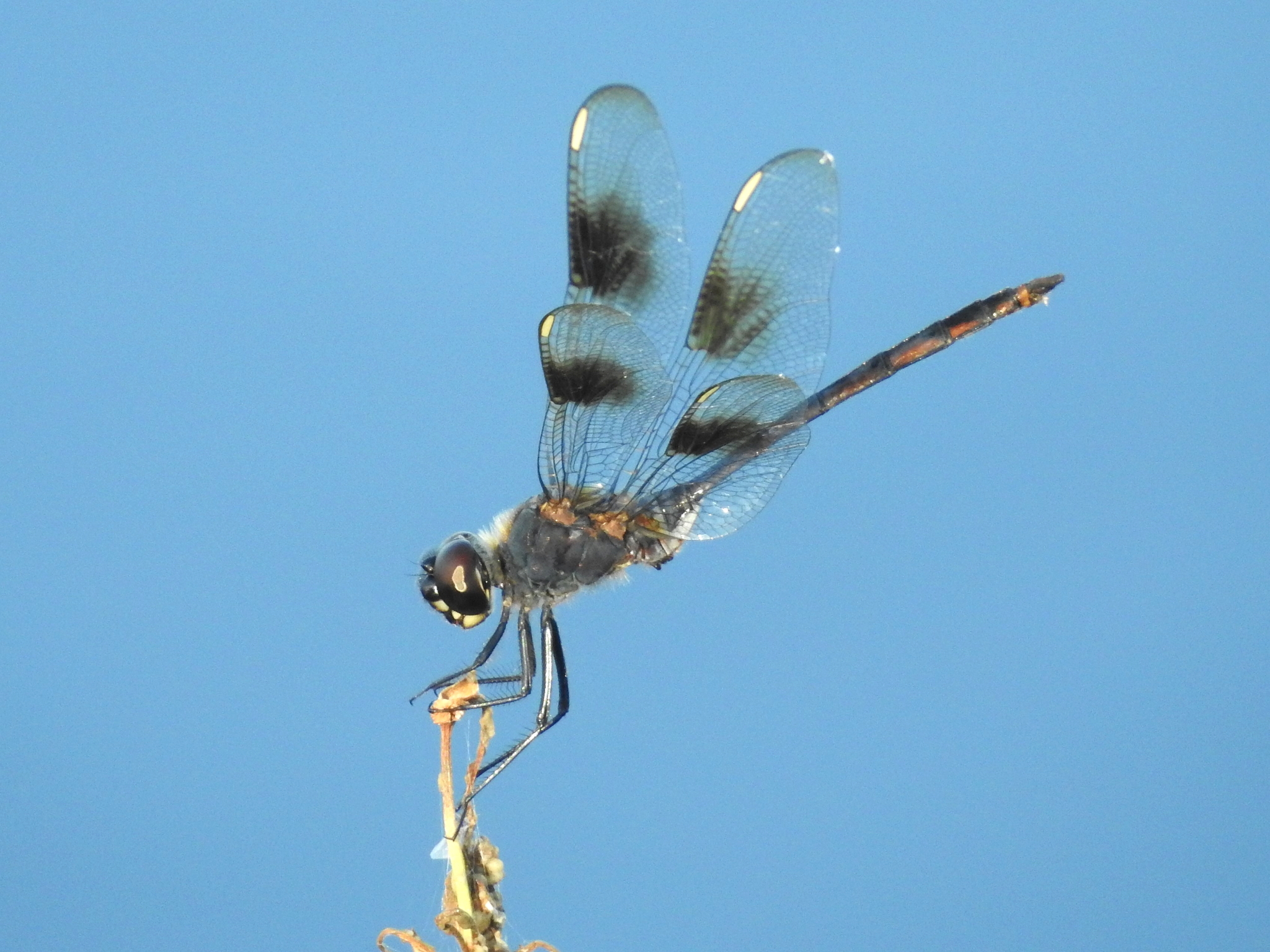
- Male at Lake Apopka, Florida
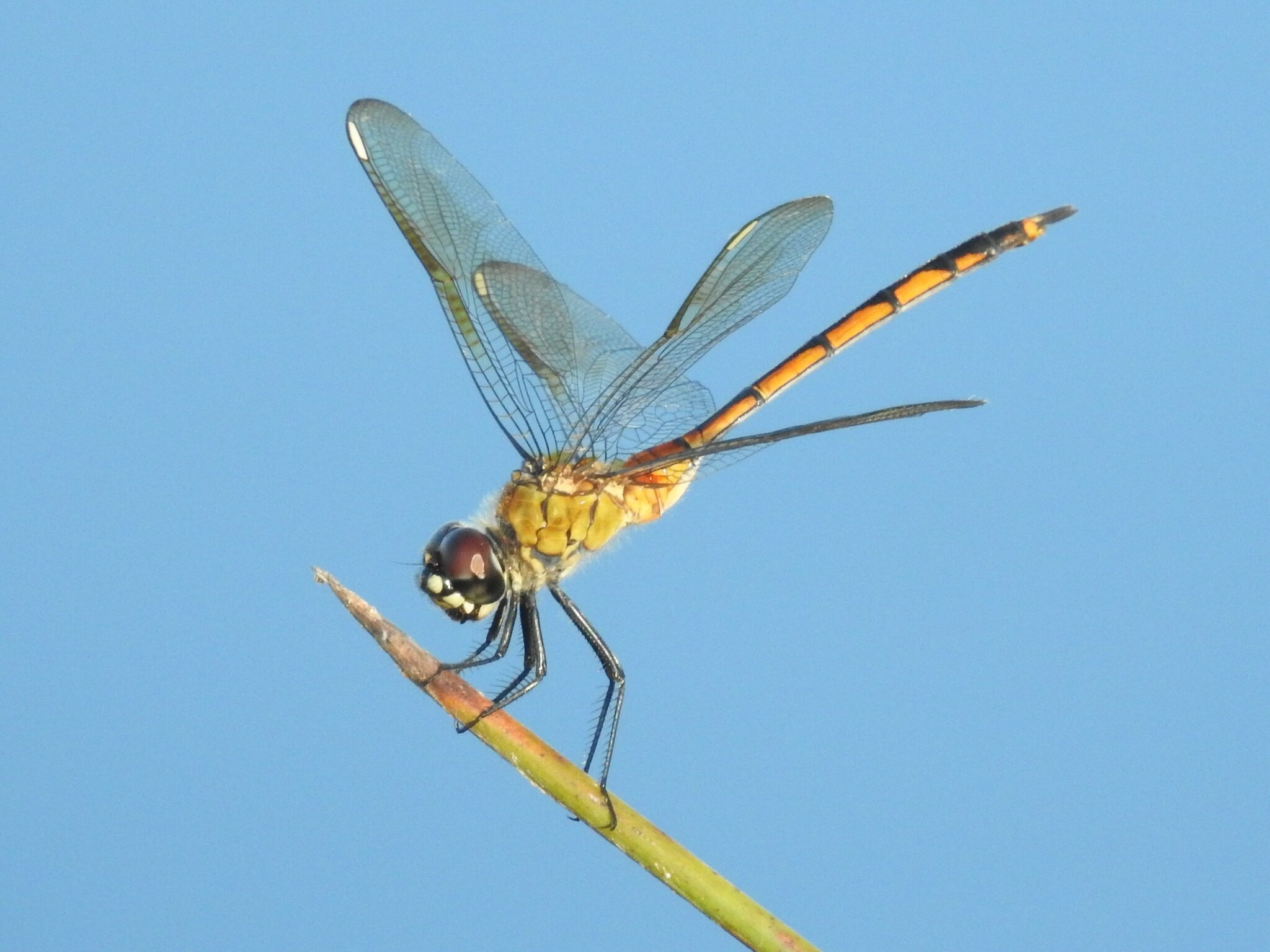
- Female at Lake Apopka, Florida

Conservation status
- Least Concern (IUCN 3.1)

Scientific classification
- Kingdom: Animalia
- Phylum: Arthropoda
- Class: Insecta
- Order: Odonata
- Infraorder: Anisoptera
- Family: Libellulidae
- Genus: Brachymesia
- Species: B. gravida

Binomial name
- Brachymesia gravida (Calvert, 1890)

= Brachymesia gravida =

Species of dragonfly

Brachymesia gravida, the four-spotted pennant, is a species of skimmer in the dragonfly family Libellulidae. It is found in North America.

The IUCN conservation status of Brachymesia gravida is "LC", least concern, with no immediate threat to the species' survival. The population is stable. The IUCN status was reviewed in 2017.

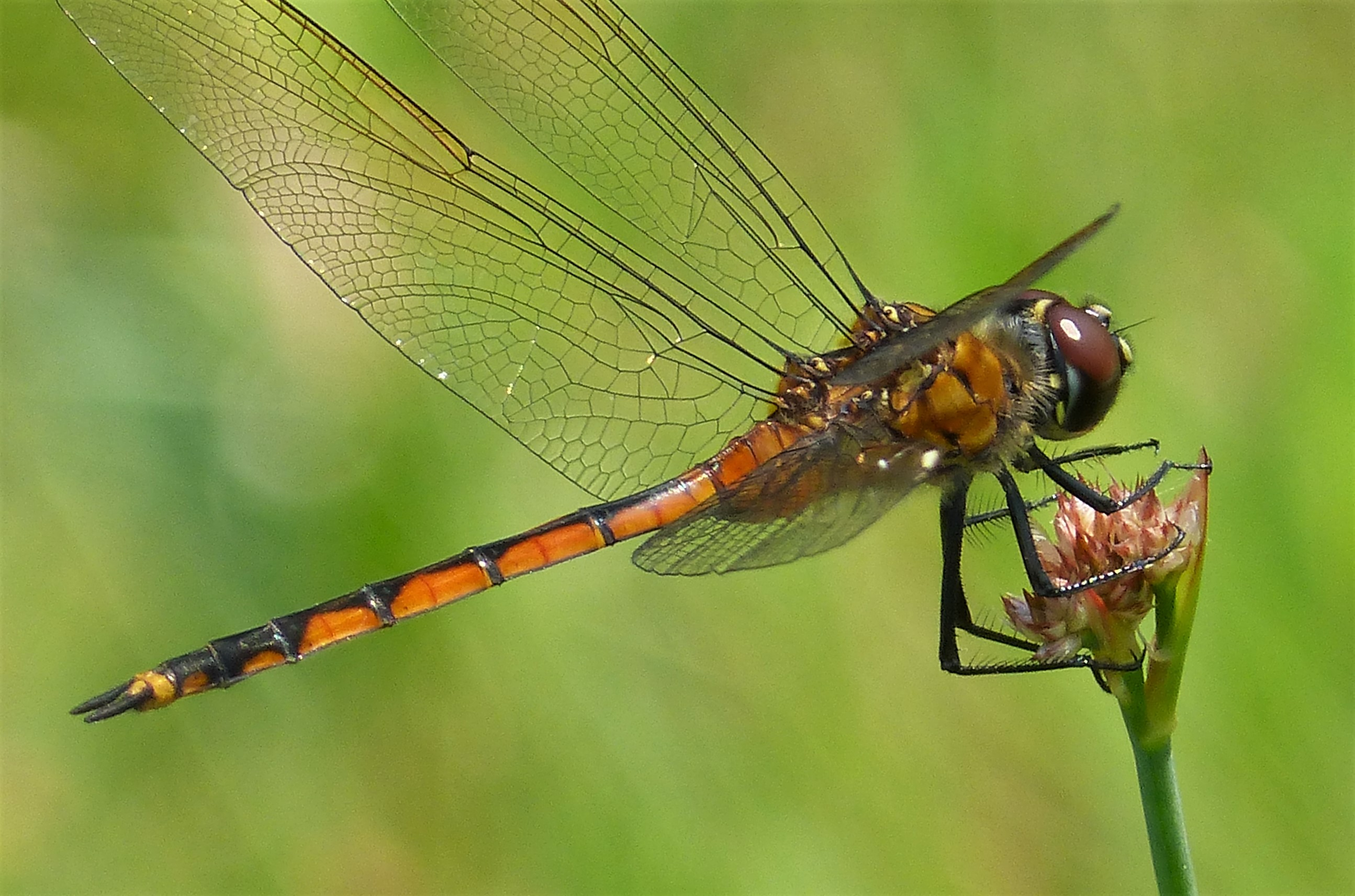
Four-spotted pennant, Brachymesia gravida
