= List of reptiles of Mexico =

This list of reptiles of Mexico is made up of 995 species of reptiles registered in Mexico. Listing is based on The Reptile Database. The reptiles of Mexico are grouped into 3 orders and 35 families, and include snakes, lizards, crocodilians and turtles.

Table of contents

Turtles: Cheloniidae · Dermochelyidae · Chelydridae · Dermatemydidae · Emydidae · Geoemydidae · Kinosternidae

Crocodilians: Crocodylidae · Alligatoridae

Lizards: Anguidae · Diploglossidae · Gekkonidae · Eublepharidae · Phyllodactylidae · Sphaerodactylidae · Helodermatidae · Corytophanidae · Iguanidae · Phrynosomatidae · Dactyloidae · Scincidae · Teiidae · Gymnophthalmidae · Xantusiidae · Xenosauridae

Snakes: Anomalepididae · Leptotyphlopidae · Typhlopidae · Boidae · Loxocemidae · Colubridae · Dipsadidae · Natricidae · Elapidae · Viperidae

See also Notes References

== Turtles (Testudines) ==
Mexico has a total of 54 species of turtle, grouped into 7 families and 20 genera. Among them, there are 6 marine species, almost all of them in danger of extinction.

=== Cheloniidae ===
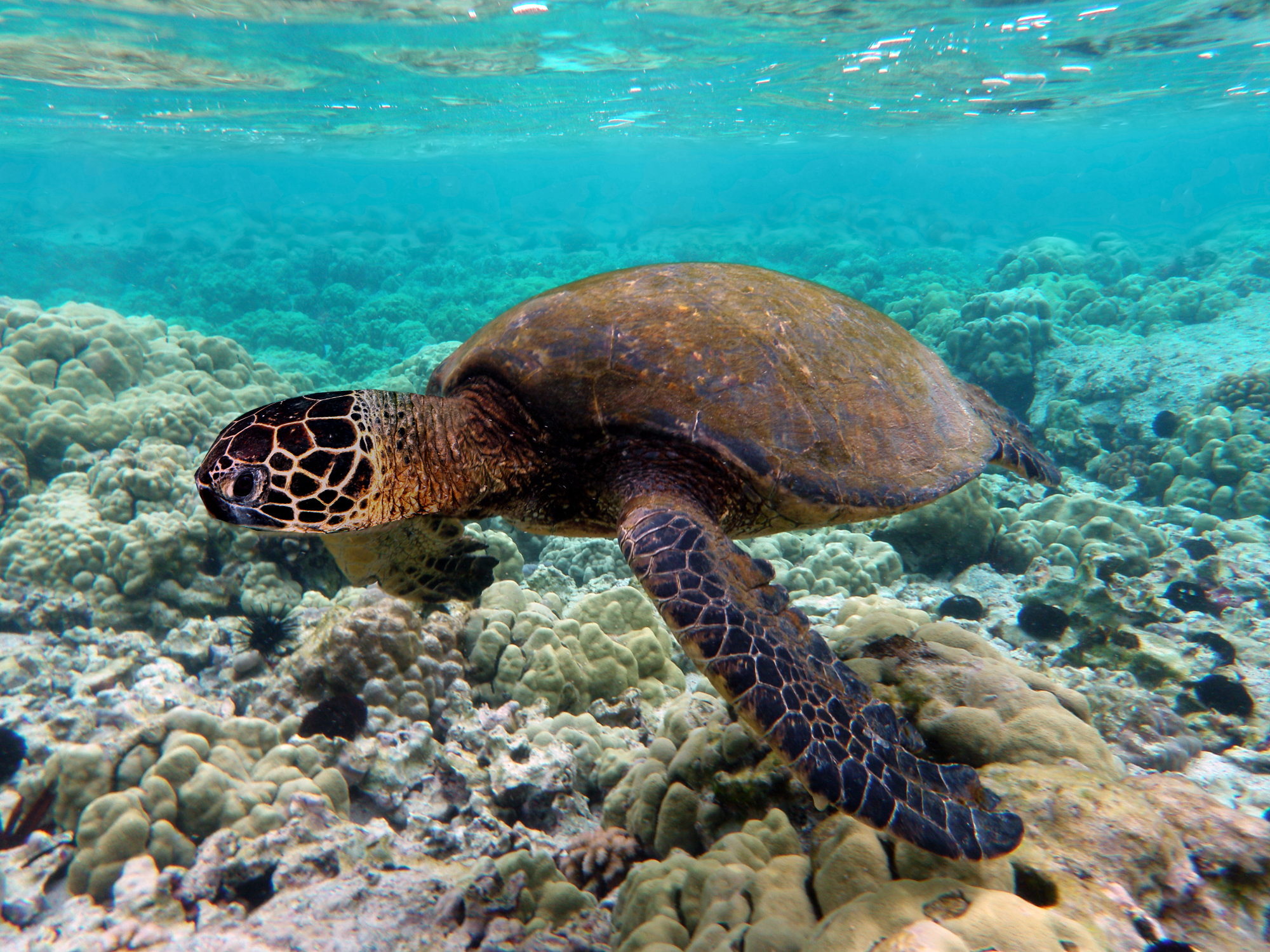
Chelonia mydas

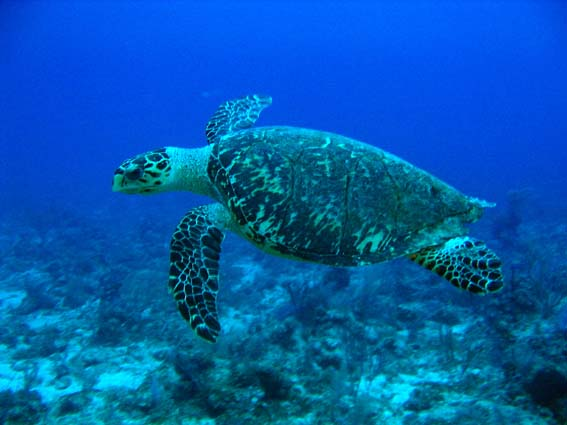
Eretmochelys imbricata

Order: Testudines · Family: Cheloniidae

Sea turtles (Cheloniidae) are a family of large turtles found in all tropical seas and some subtropical and temperate seas. Sea turtles developed from land turtles about 120 million years ago and are well adapted to life in the sea. They feed mainly on jellyfish, crustaceans and squid. There are 5 or 6 species in the world, of which at least 5 are currently in danger of extinction.

- Loggerhead sea turtle - Caretta caretta (Linnaeus, 1758) EN
- Green sea turtle - Chelonia mydas (Linnaeus, 1758) EN
- Hawksbill sea turtle - Eretmochelys imbricata (Linnaeus, 1766) CR
- Kemp's ridley sea turtle - Lepidochelys kempii Garman, 1880 CR
- Olive ridley sea turtle - Lepidochelys olivacea (Eschscholtz, 1829) VU

=== Dermochelyidae ===
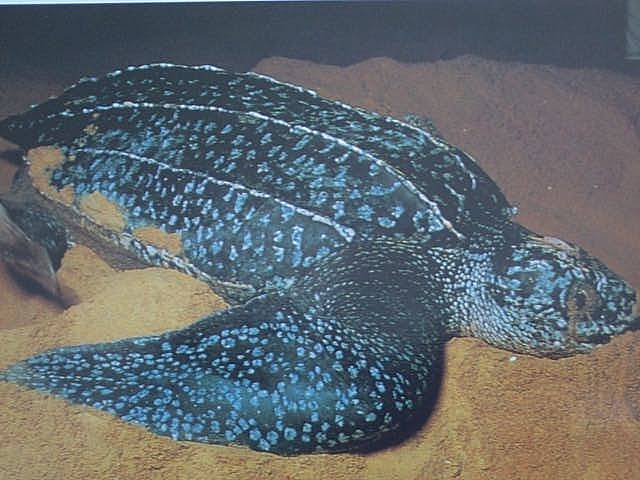
Dermochelys coriacea

Order: Testudines · Family: Dermochelyidae

The leatherback sea turtle (Dermochelys coriacea) is the largest of all existing turtles and can reach a length of 2 meters and a weight of more than 600 kg. It is found in all tropical or subtropical seas. Unlike most sea turtles, leatherbacks are often found in the colder waters of temperate zones. It is the only extant species of the Dermochelyidae family and is considered critically endangered. All other species in this family are only known as fossils.

- Dermochelys coriacea (Vandelli, 1761) CR

=== Chelydridae ===
Order: Testudines · Family: Chelydridae

Chelydrids (Chelydridae) are a family of freshwater turtles that is made up of seven extinct genera and two extant genera, both native to the American continent. The existing genera are the snapping turtles (Chelydra) with three species, and the alligator turtles (Macrochelys) with a single species. Of the total of four existing species, 2 occur in Mexico.

- Central American snapping turtle - Chelydra rossignonii (Bocourt, 1868) VU
- Common snapping turtle - Chelydra serpentina (Linnaeus, 1758)

=== Dermatemydidae ===
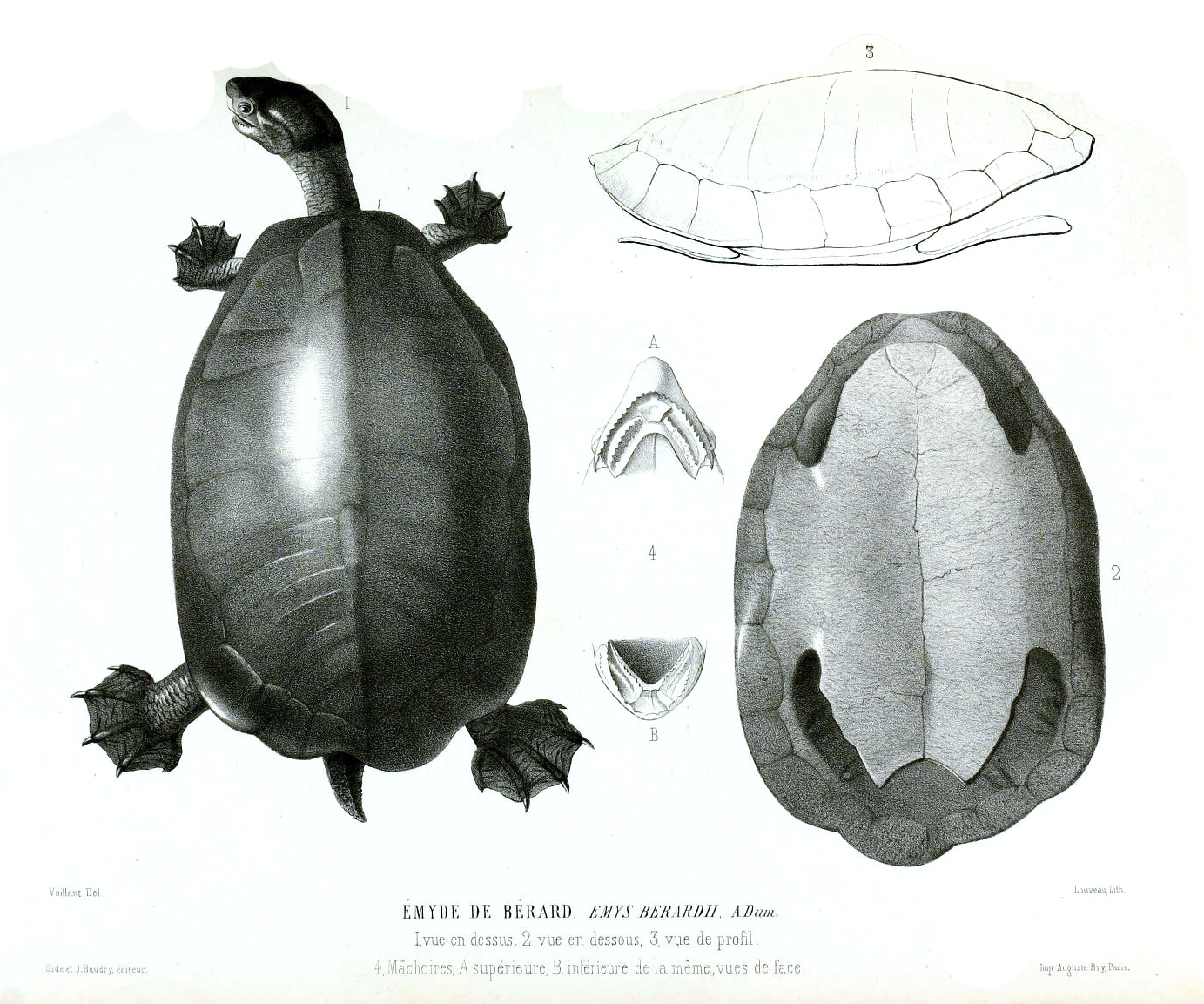
Dermatemys mawii

Order: Testudines · Family: Dermatemydidae

The white turtle is the only existing species in the Dermatemydidae family. It is a nocturnal, aquatic turtle that lives in large rivers and lakes in Central America, from southern Mexico to northern Honduras. It is one of the most exploited turtles in the world and is classified as a critically endangered species by the IUCN. It is quite large and can weigh around 20 kg. Its flattened shell can reach a length of 65 cm and is generally gray or almost black in color. Its plastron is normally cream colored.

- Dermatemys mawii Gray, 1847 CR

=== Emydidae ===
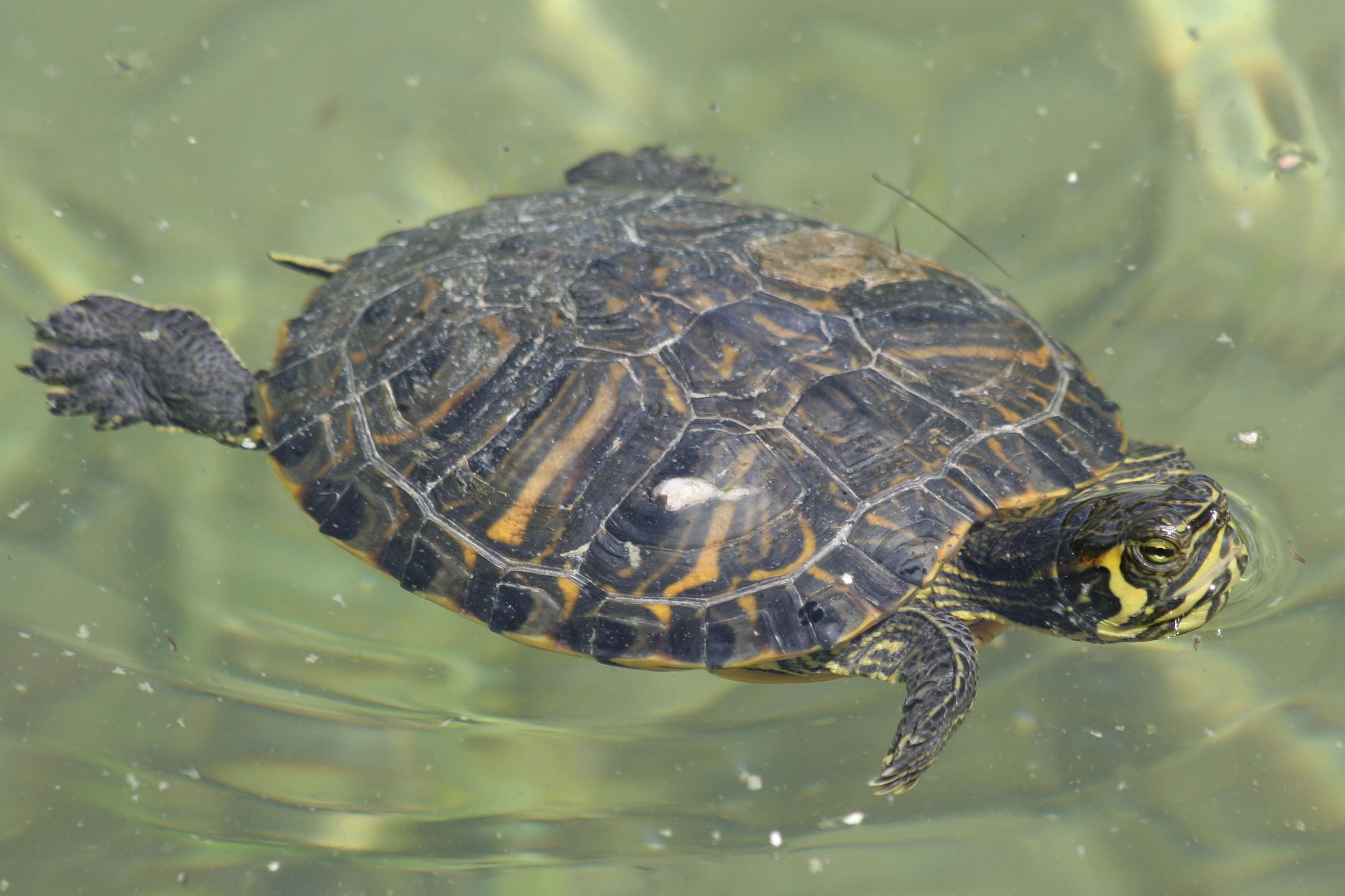
Trachemys scripta

Order: Testudines · Family: Emydidae

The emydids (Emydidae) are a family of carnivorous aquatic and semi-aquatic turtles. They live most of the time in ponds, reservoirs and rivers, coming to land when they have to find suitable places to lay their eggs. This family is made up of 10 genera that contain more than 50 species. 18 species occur in Mexico.

- Actinemys marmorata (Baird & Girard, 1852) VU
- Chrysemys picta (Schneider, 1783)
- Deirochelys reticularia (Latreille, 1801)
- Pseudemys concinna (Le Conte, 1830)
- Pseudemys gorzugi Ward, 1984
- Terrapene carolina (Linnaeus, 1758)
- Terrapene coahuila Schmidt & Owens, 1944 EN
- Terrapene mexicana (Gray, 1849)
- Terrapene nelsoni Stejneger, 1925
- Terrapene ornata (Agassiz, 1857) NT
- Trachemys gaigeae (Hartweg, 1939)
- Trachemys grayi (Bocourt, 1868)
- Trachemys nebulosa (Van Denburgh, 1895)
- Trachemys ornata (Gray, 1831) VU
- Trachemys scripta (Thunberg in Schoepff, 1792)
- Trachemys taylori (Legler, 1960)
- Trachemys venusta (Gray, 1855)
- Trachemys yaquia (Legler & Webb, 1970)

=== Geoemydidae ===
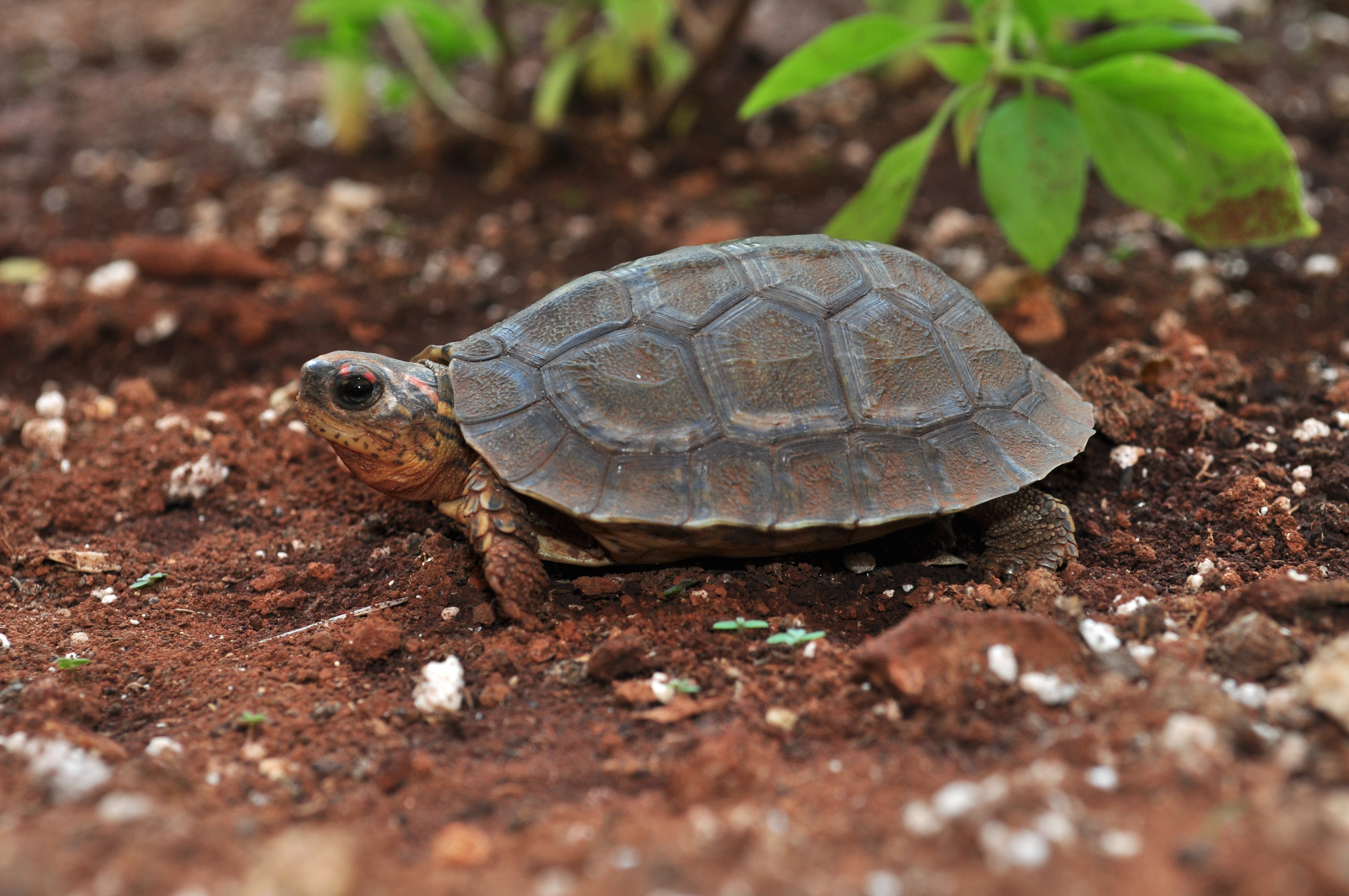
Rhinoclemmys areolata

Orden: Testudines · Familia: Geoemydidae

- Rhinoclemmys areolata (Duméril & Bibron, 1851) NT
- Rhinoclemmys pulcherrima (Gray, 1855) NT
- Rhinoclemmys rubida (Cope, 1870)

=== Kinosternidae ===
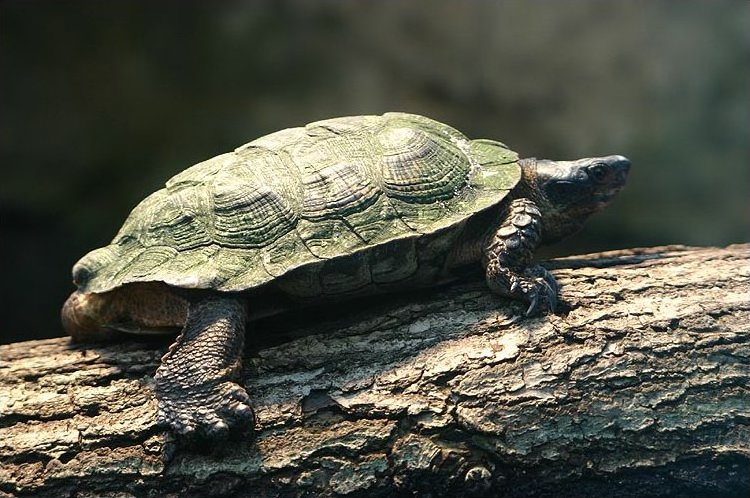
Kinosternon scorpioides

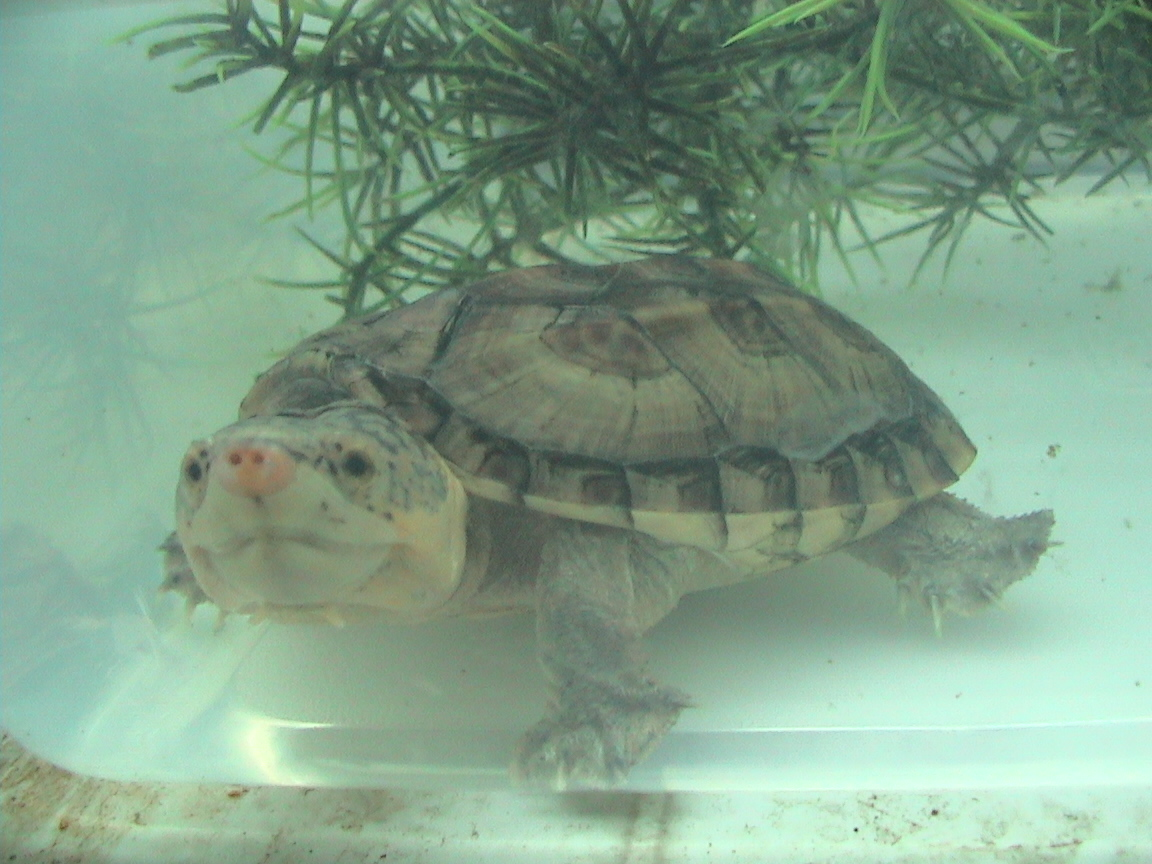
Staurotypus salvinii

Order: Testudines · Family: Kinosternidae

Chinosternids (Kinosternidae), or mud turtles, are a family of turtles native to the Americas. They are mostly small turtles that inhabit bodies of water with soft, muddy bottoms with an abundance of vegetation. All members of the family are carnivores and feed on crustaceans, aquatic insects, mollusks, annelids, amphibians, small fish and sometimes carrion. The Kinosternidae family has a total of 4 genera and 25 species. 18 species occur in Mexico.

- Claudius angustatus Cope, 1865 NT
- Cryptochelys acuta (Gray, 1831) NT
- Cryptochelys creaseri (Hartweg, 1934) NT
- Cryptochelys herrerai (Stejneger, 1925) VU
- Cryptochelys leucostomum Duméril & Bibron, 1851 VU
- Kinosternon alamosae Berry & Legler, 1980
- Kinosternon stejnegeri (Gilmore, 1923)
- Kinosternon chimalhuaca Berry, Seidel & Iverson, 1997
- Kinosternon durangoense Iverson, 1979 VU
- Kinosternon flavescens (Agassiz, 1857)
- Kinosternon hirtipes (Wagler, 1830) VU
- Kinosternon integrum Le Conte, 1854 VU
- Kinosternon oaxacae Berry & Iverson, 1980
- Kinosternon scorpioides (Linnaeus, 1766)
- Kinosternon sonoriense Le Conte, 1854 VU
- Staurotypus salvinii Gray, 1864 NT
- Staurotypus triporcatus (Wiegmann, 1828) NT
- Sternotherus odoratus (Latreille, 1802)

== Crocodilians (Crocodylia) ==
=== Crocodylidae ===
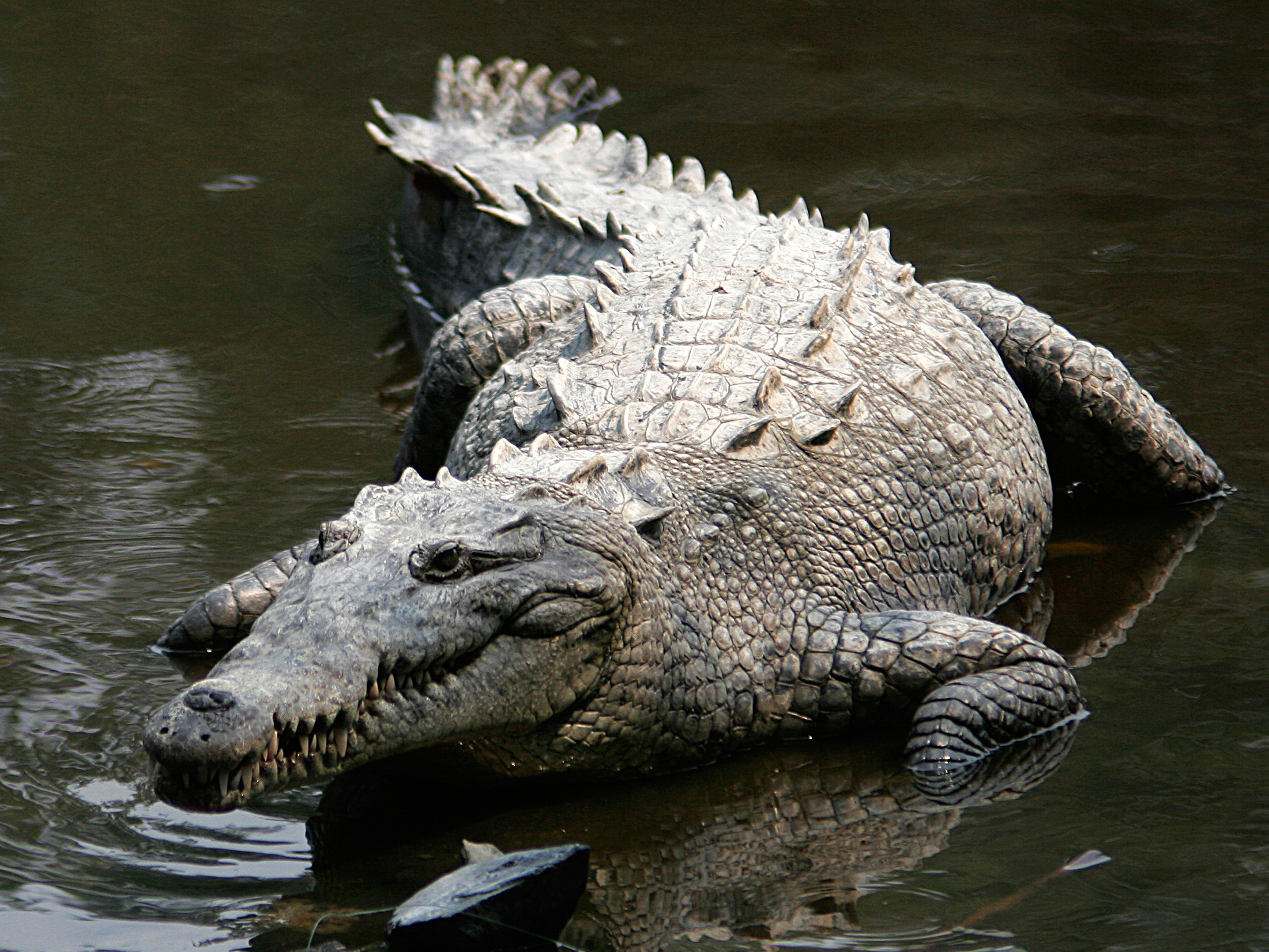
Crocodylus acutus

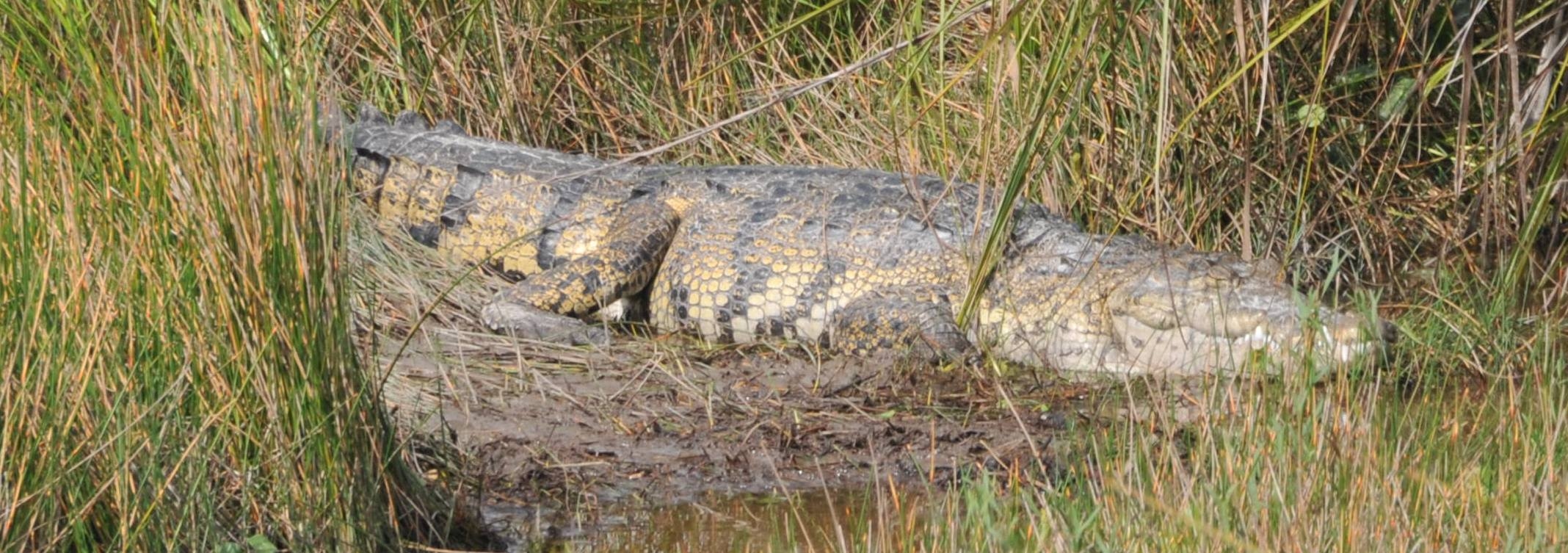
Crocodylus moreletii

Order: Crocodylia · Family: Crocodylidae

Crocodiles (Crocodylidae) are a family of archosaur sauropsids. This family includes 14 species of large semi-aquatic reptiles that inhabit tropical areas of the world. Crocodiles tend to congregate in freshwater habitats, such as rivers, lakes, wetlands, and sometimes brackish water. They are ambush hunters who usually wait for their prey, generally fish or land animals, to approach, before attacking them. They feed mainly on vertebrates such as fish, reptiles and mammals, and sometimes invertebrates such as mollusks and crustaceans, depending on the species. As cold-blooded predators, they have a slow metabolism and can therefore survive long periods without food. Despite their slow appearance, crocodiles are very fast over short distances, even out of water.

- Crocodylus acutus Cuvier, 1807 VU
- Crocodylus moreletii Duméril & Bocourt, 1851

=== Alligatoridae ===
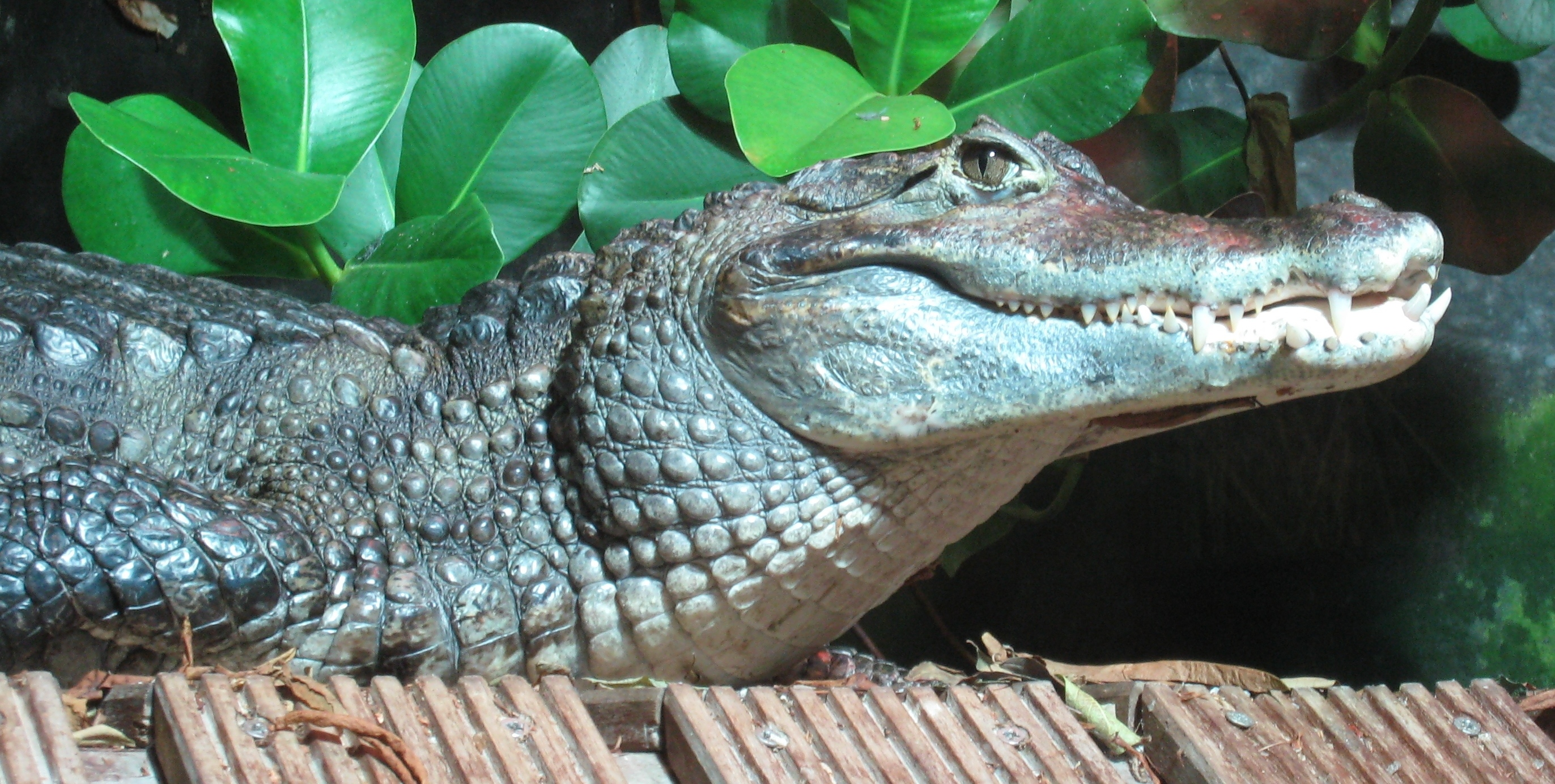
Caiman crocodilus

Order: Crocodylia · Family: Alligatoridae

The alligatorids (Alligatoridae) are a family of crocodilian sauropsids (reptiles) native to the Americas. It includes the extant genera Alligator, Caiman, Melanosuchus and Paleosuchus, as well as numerous extinct genera. Of the 7 species that inhabit America, 2 occur in Mexico.

- Alligator mississippiensis (Daudin, 1802)
- Caiman crocodilus Linnaeus, 1758

== Lizards (Squamata - suborders Dibamidae, Laterata, Gekkota, Iguania, Anguimorpha, Scincomorpha) ==
=== Anguidae ===
Order: Squamata · Family: Anguidae

Anguids (Anguidae) are a family of anguimorphic scaly sauropsids that includes glass lizards, snapdragons, northern alligator lizards, and alicante lizards. Species of the Anguinae subfamily are characterized by leg atrophy, despite the fact that they are not directly related to snakes or amphisbaenae, as this is a notable case of evolutionary convergence. The family was described by the English naturalist John Edward Gray in 1825. The distribution of Anguidae spans the Old and New Worlds. It is only absent in Australia. Most species are terrestrial, living in the leaf litter on the forest floor. The anguid family is divided into four subfamilies (one extinct), 10 non-extinct genera, and contains 94 species. In Mexico there are 50 species.

- Abronia antauges Cope, 1866
- Abronia aurita Cope, 1869 EN
- Abronia bogerti Tihen, 1954 DD
- Abronia chiszari Smith & Smith, 1981 EN
- Abronia cuetzpali Campbell, Solano-Zavaleta, Flores-Villela, Caviedes-Solis & Frost, 2016 NE
- Abronia deppii Wiegmann, 1828 EN
- Abronia fuscolabialis Tihen, 1944 EN
- Abronia gadovii Boulenger, 1913
- Abronia graminea Cope, 1864 VU
- Abronia juarezi Karges & Wright, 1987
- Abronia leurolepis Campbell & Frost, 1993 DD
- Abronia lythrochila Smith & Álvarez del Toro, 1963 LC
- Abronia martindelcampoi Flores-Villela & Sánchez-H., 2003 EN
- Abronia matudai Hartweg & Tihen, 1946 EN
- Abronia mitchelli Campbell, 1982 DD
- Abronia mixteca Bogert & Porter, 1967
- Abronia moreletii Bocourt, 1872 LC
- Abronia morenica Clause, Luna-Reyes & Nieto-Montes De Oca, 2020 NE
- Abronia oaxacae Günther, 1885 VU
- Abronia ochoterenai Martín del Campo, 1939 DD
- Abronia ornelasi Campbell, 1984 DD
- Abronia ramirezi Campbell, 1994 DD
- Abronia reidi Werler & Shannon, 1961 DD
- Abronia smithi Campbell & Frost, 1993 LC
- Abronia taeniata Wiegmann, 1828 EN
- Abronia viridiflava Bocourt, 1873
- Abronia zongolica García-Vázquez, Clause, Gutiérrez-Rodríguez, Cazares-Hernández & de la Torre-Loranca, 2022 NE
- Barisia herrerae Zaldîvar-Riverón & Nieto-Montes de Oca, 2002
- Barisia imbricata Wiegmann, 1828
- Barisia levicollis Stejneger, 1890
- Barisia rudicollis (Wiegmann, 1828)<meta />
- Desertum lugoi McCoy, 1970
- Elgaria kingii Gray, 1838
- Elgaria multicarinata (Blainville, 1835)
- Elgaria paucicarinata (Fitch, 1934)
- Elgaria velazquezi Grismer & Hollingsworth, 2001
- Gerrhonotus farri Bryson & Graham, 2010
- Gerrhonotus infernalis Baird, 1859
- Gerrhonotus lazcanoi Banda-Leal, Nevárez-de los Reyes, Bryson, 2017
- Gerrhonotus liocephalus Wiegmann, 1828
- Gerrhonotus mccoyi García-Vázquez, Contreras-Arquieta, Trujano-Ortega & Nieto-Montes de Oca, 2018
- Gerrhonotus ophiurus Cope, 1867
- Gerrhonotus parvus Knight & Scudday, 1985
- Ophisaurus ceroni Holman, 1965
- Ophisaurus incomptus McConkey, 1955

=== Diploglossidae ===
Orden: Squamata · Familia: Diploglossidae

- Celestus enneagrammus (Cope, 1860)
- Celestus rozellae (Smith, 1942)
- Diploglossus atitlanensis (Smith, 1950)
- Diploglossus ingridae Werler & Campbell, 2004
- Diploglossus legnotus Campbell & Camarillo, 1994
- Diploglossus microcephalus (Hallowell, 1856)
- Diploglossus owenii Duméril & Bibron, 1839

=== Gekkonidae ===
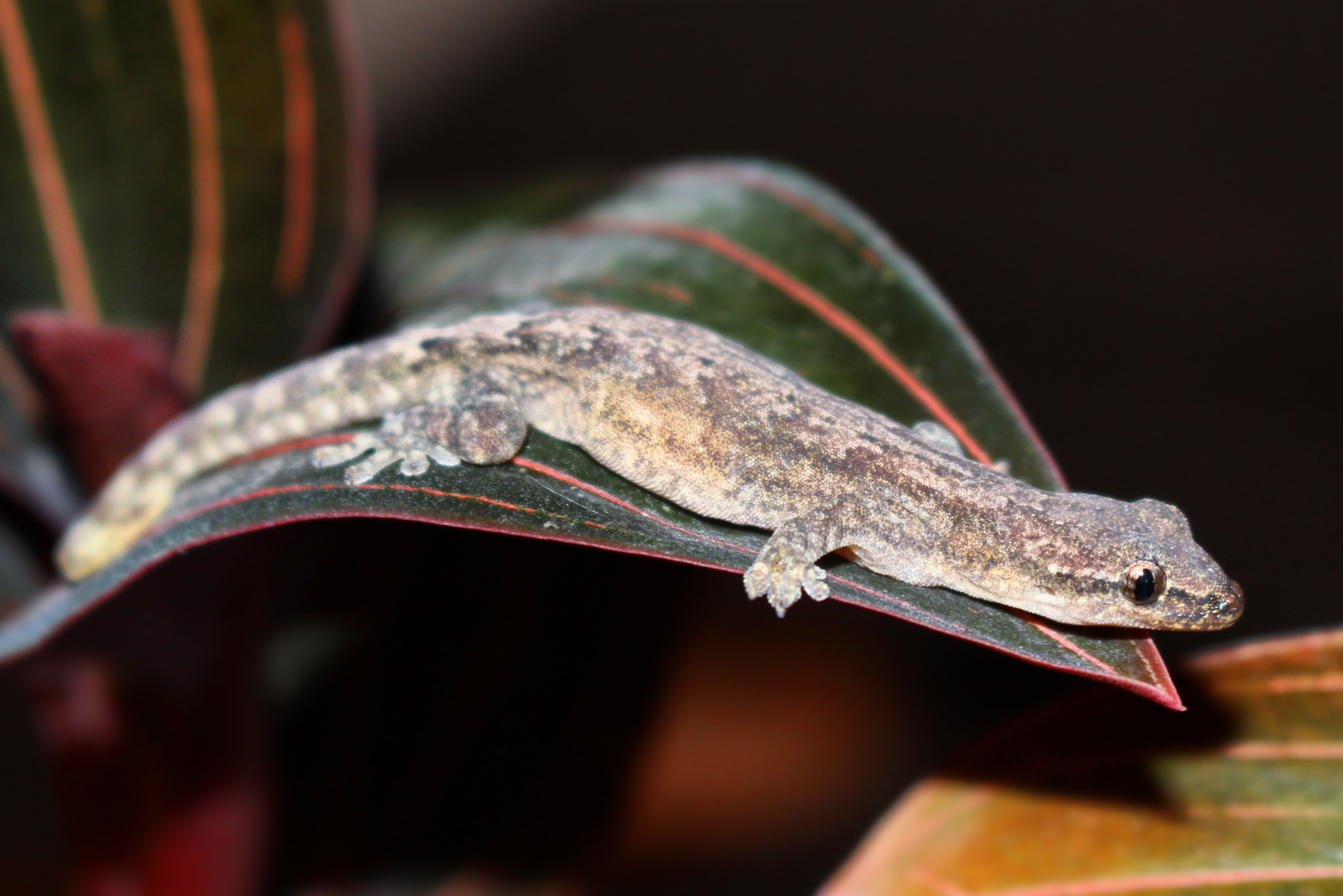
Lepidodactylus lugubris

Order: Squamata · Family: Gekkonidae

Geconids or geckos (Gekkonidae) are a family of scaly sauropsids (reptiles), which includes small to medium-sized species found in temperate and tropical climates around the world. They have several peculiar features that clearly distinguish them from other lizards. They are unique in their vocalization, as they make screeching noises in their interactions with other geckos. They are nocturnal, with large eyes and equipped with vertical lobed pupils that allow an extraordinary margin of variation in their opening. Many species have sticky pads on the soles of their feet that allow them to climb smooth vertical surfaces and even navigate roofs. The gecko family has a global distribution. 6 species occur in Mexico.

- Gehyra mutilata (Wiegmann, 1834)
- Hemidactylus brookii Gray, 1845
- Hemidactylus frenatus Schlegel, 1836
- Hemidactylus mabouia (Moreau de Jonnès, 1818)
- Hemidactylus turcicus (Linnaeus, 1758)
- Lepidodactylus lugubris (Duméril & Bibron, 1836)

=== Eublepharidae ===
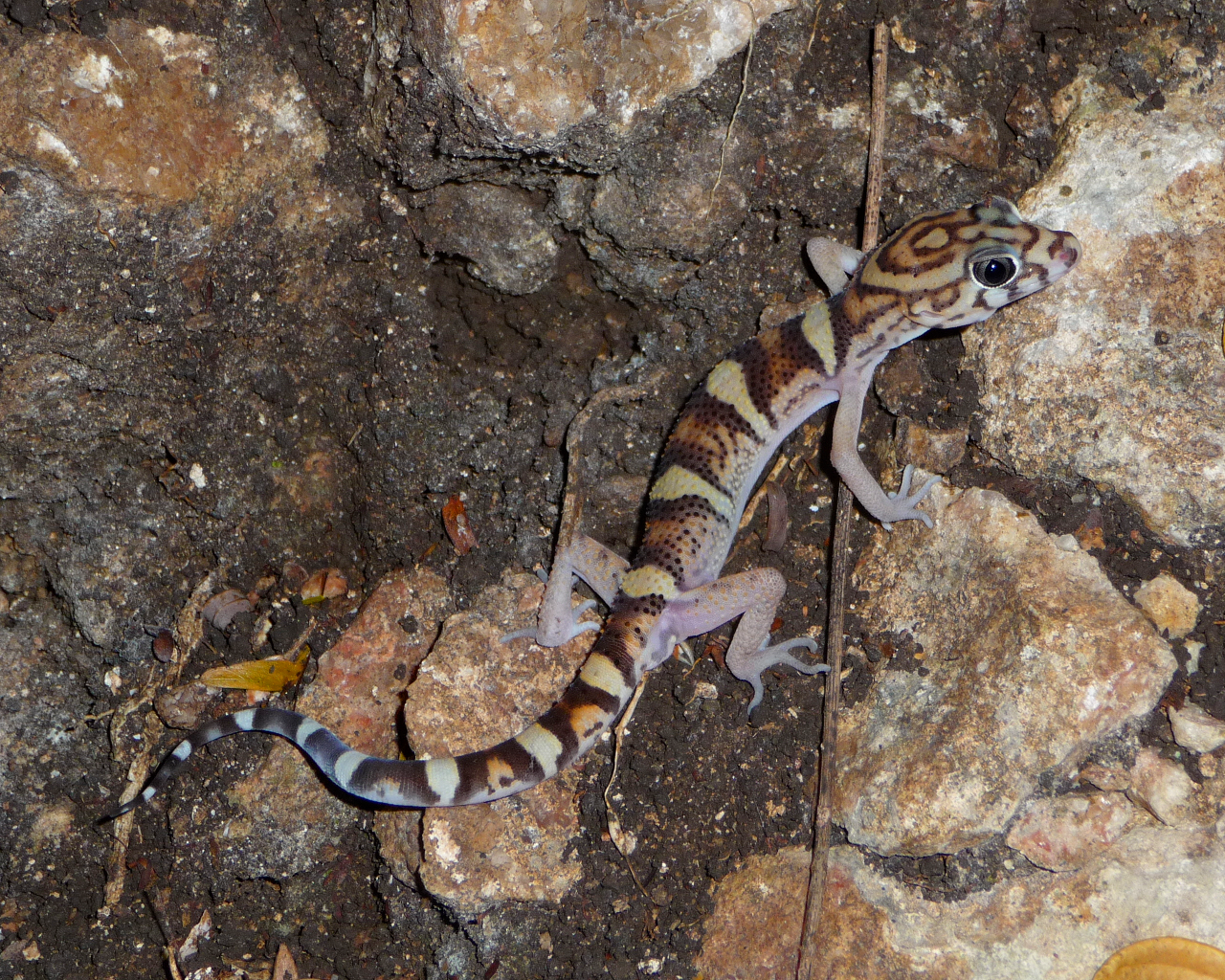
Coleonyx elegans

Order: Squamata · Family: Eublepharidae

The eublepharidae (Eublepharidae) are a family of lizards that belong to the infraorder Gekkota. It is made up of 27 species grouped into five genera. They have more primitive characteristics than other geckos. In particular, the feet lack the modifications that allow most geckos to scale steep surfaces. Unlike other geckos, they also have mobile eyelids. They are nocturnal lizards that feed mainly on insects. 6 species occur in Mexico.

- Coleonyx brevis Stejneger, 1893
- Coleonyx elegans Gray, 1845
- Coleonyx fasciatus (Boulenger, 1885)
- Coleonyx reticulatus Davis & Dixon, 1958
- Coleonyx switaki (Murphy, 1974)
- Coleonyx variegatus (Baird, 1858)

=== Phyllodactylidae ===
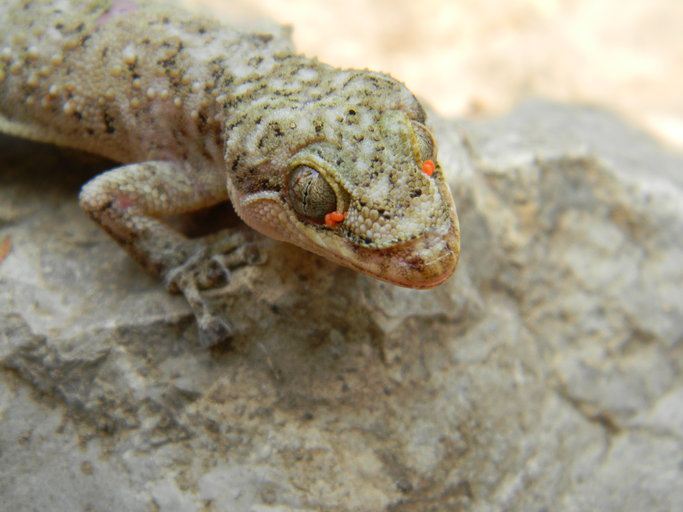
Phyllodactylus tuberculosus

Order: Squamata · Family: Phyllodactylidae

- Phyllodactylus angelensis Dixon, 1966
- Phyllodactylus apricus Dixon, 1966
- Phyllodactylus bordai Taylor, 1942
- Phyllodactylus bugastrolepis Dixon, 1966
- Phyllodactylus davisi Dixon, 1964
- Phyllodactylus delcampoi Mosauer, 1936
- Phyllodactylus duellmani Dixon, 1960
- Phyllodactylus homolepidurus Smith, 1935
- Phyllodactylus lanei Smith, 1935
- Phyllodactylus muralis Taylor, 1940
- Phyllodactylus nocticolus Dixon, 1964
- Phyllodactylus papenfussi Murphy, Blair & de la Cruz, 2009
- Phyllodactylus partidus Dixon, 1966
- Phyllodactylus paucituberculatus Dixon, 1960
- Phyllodactylus santacruzensis Dixon, 1966
- Phyllodactylus tinklei Dixon, 1966
- Phyllodactylus tuberculosus Wiegmann, 1834
- Phyllodactylus unctus (Cope, 1864)
- Phyllodactylus xanti Cope, 1863
- Thecadactylus rapicauda (Houttuyn, 1782)

=== Sphaerodactylidae ===
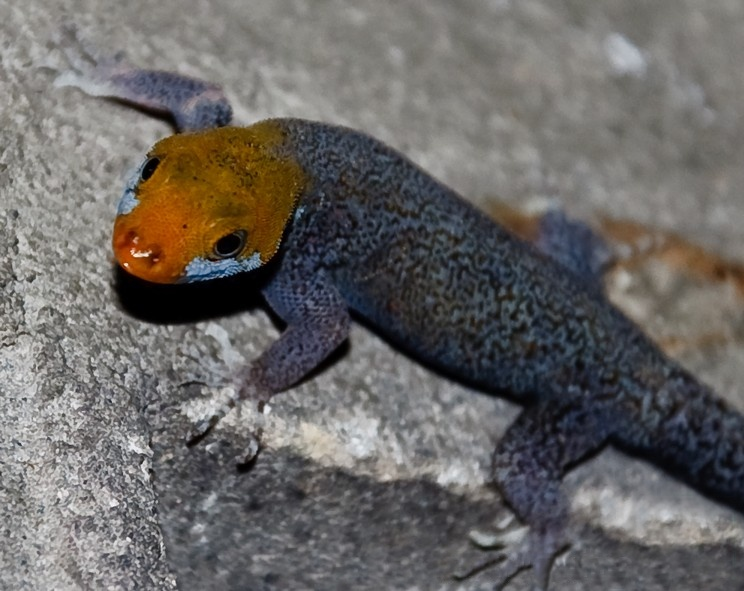
Gonatodes albogularis

Order: Squamata · Family: Sphaerodactylidae

- Aristelliger georgeensis (Bocourt, 1873)
- Gonatodes albogularis (Duméril & Bibron, 1836)
- Sphaerodactylus argus Gosse, 1850
- Sphaerodactylus continentalis Werner 1896
- Sphaerodactylus glaucus Cope, 1865
- Sphaerodactylus millepunctatus Hallowell, 1861

=== Helodermatidae ===
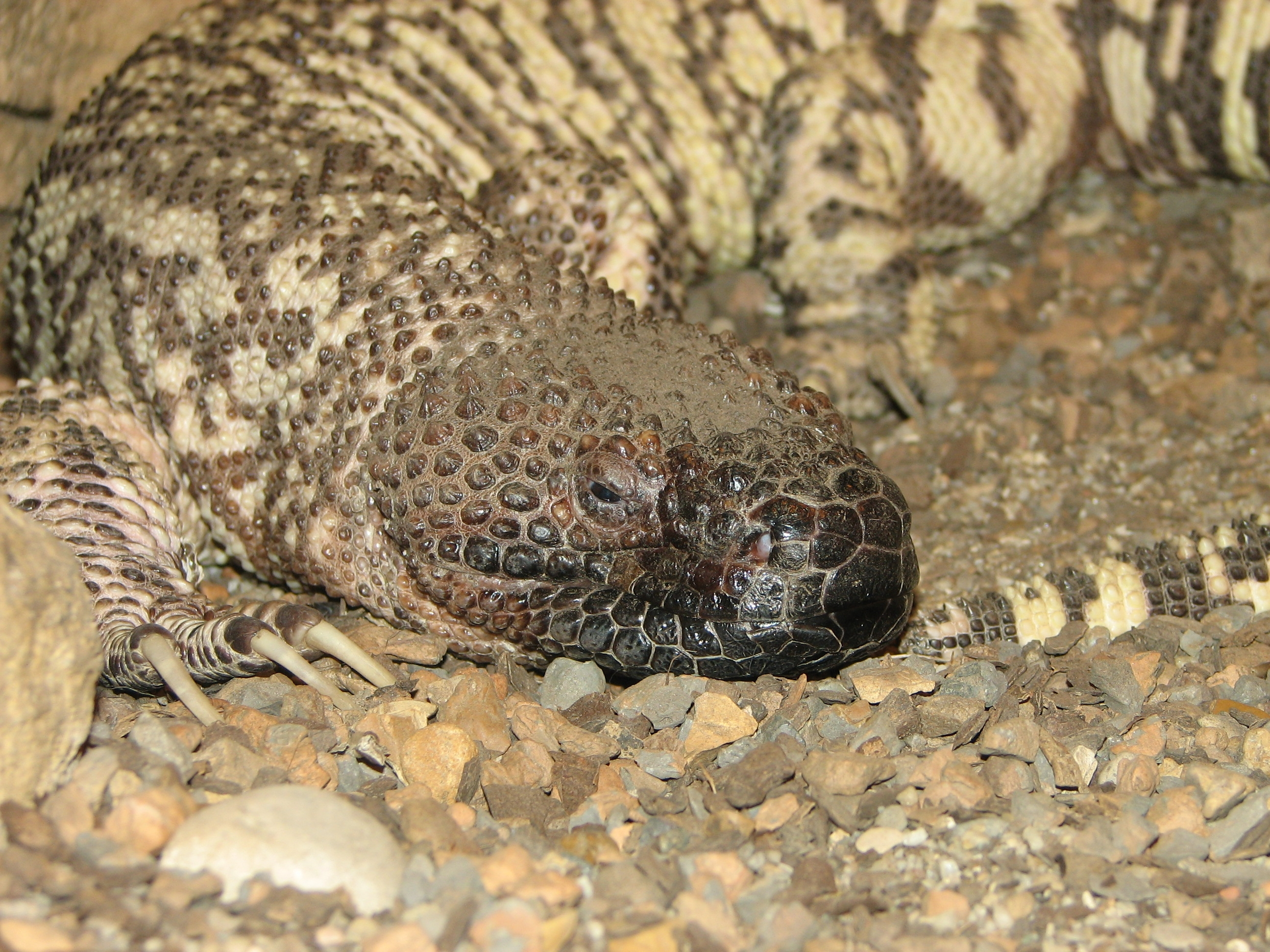
Heloderma horridum

Order: Squamata · Family: Helodermatidae

Helodermatidae is a family of terrestrial lizards whose only genus is Heloderma, which includes the only venomous lizards on the American continent. The family consists of two species native to the southwestern United States, Mexico and Guatemala, which prefer semiarid habitats. 2 species occur in Mexico.

- Heloderma horridum (Wiegmann, 1829) VU
- Heloderma suspectum Cope, 1869 NT

=== Corytophanidae ===
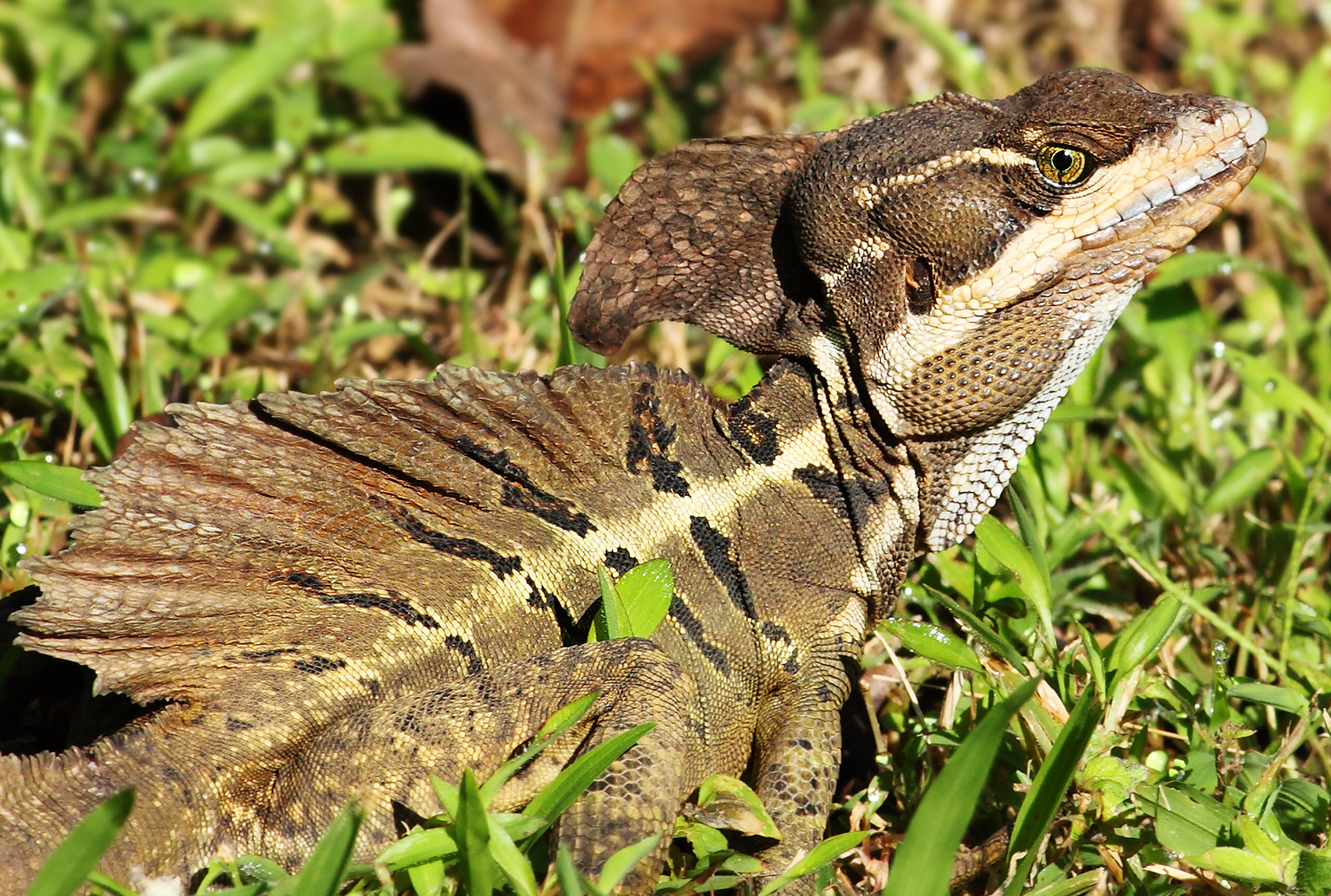
Basiliscus vittatus

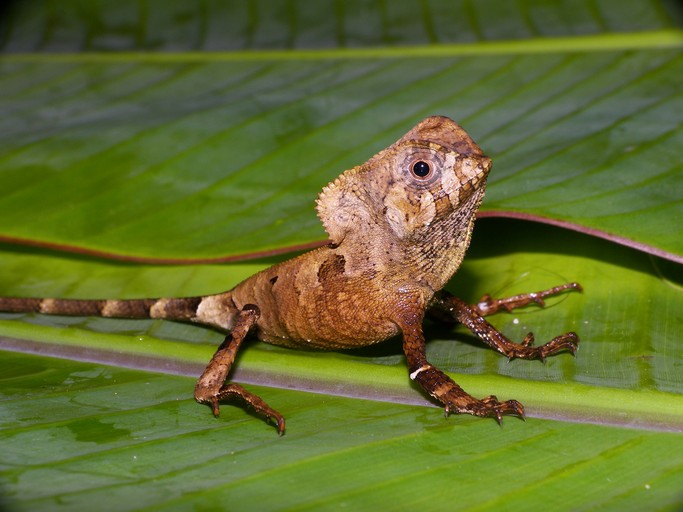
Corytophanes cristatus

Order: Squamata · Family: Corytophanidae

The corytophanids (Corytophanidae) are a family of scaly reptiles from the suborder of lizards. They typically have helmet-shaped front crests, which are sexually dimorphic characteristics in species of the genus Basiliscus, since only males develop them, while in species of the genus Corytophanes and Laemanctus they are present in both males and females. Its distribution area includes Mexico, Central and South America up to Ecuador. There are nine recognized species of corythophanids, of which 6 occur in Mexico.

- Basiliscus vittatus Wiegmann, 1828
- Corytophanes cristatus (Merrem, 1821)
- Corytophanes hernandesii (Wiegmann, 1831)
- Corytophanes percarinatus Duméril, 1856
- Laemanctus longipes Wiegmann, 1834
- Laemanctus serratus Cope, 1864

=== Iguanidae ===
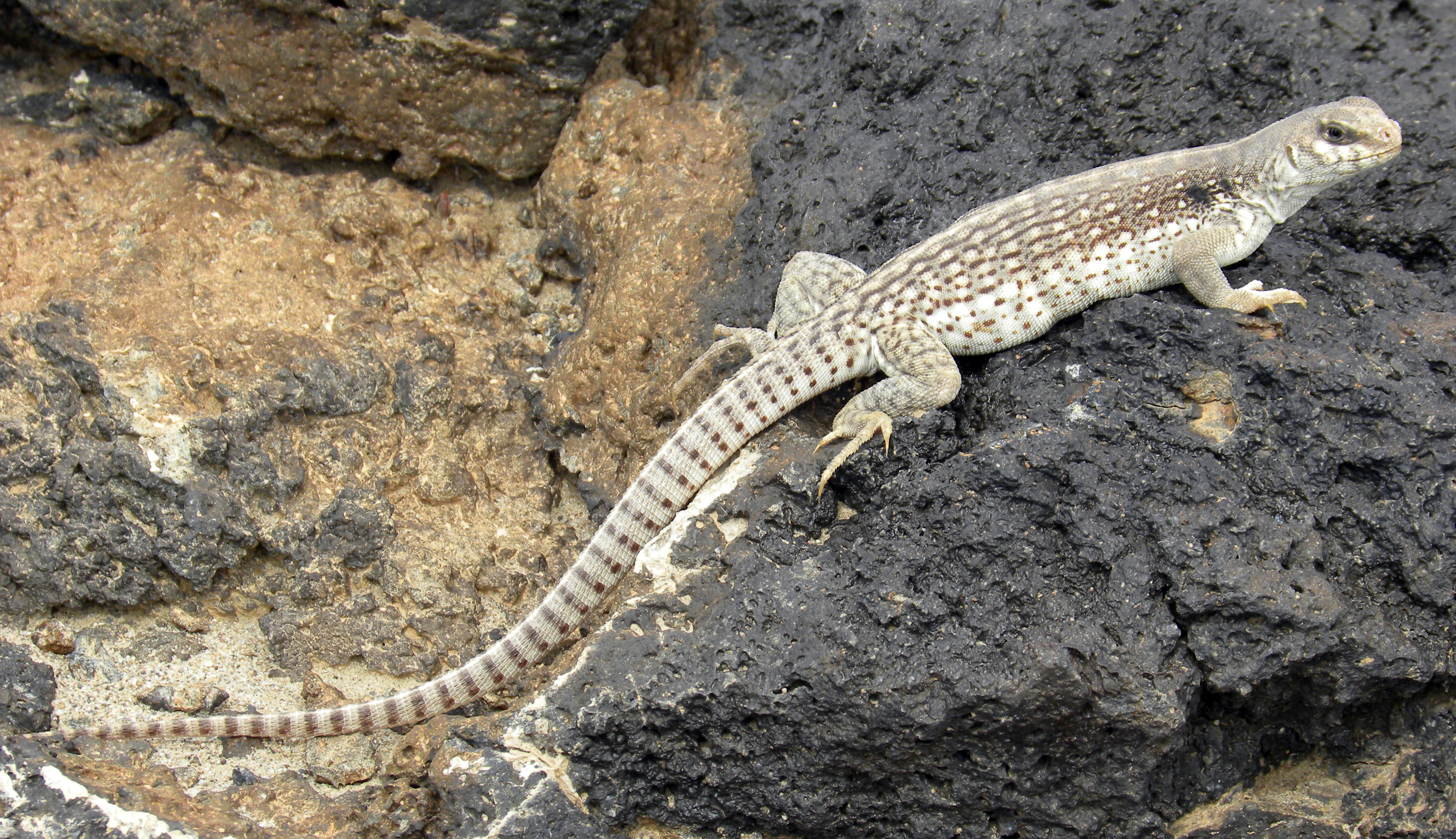
Dipsosaurus dorsalis

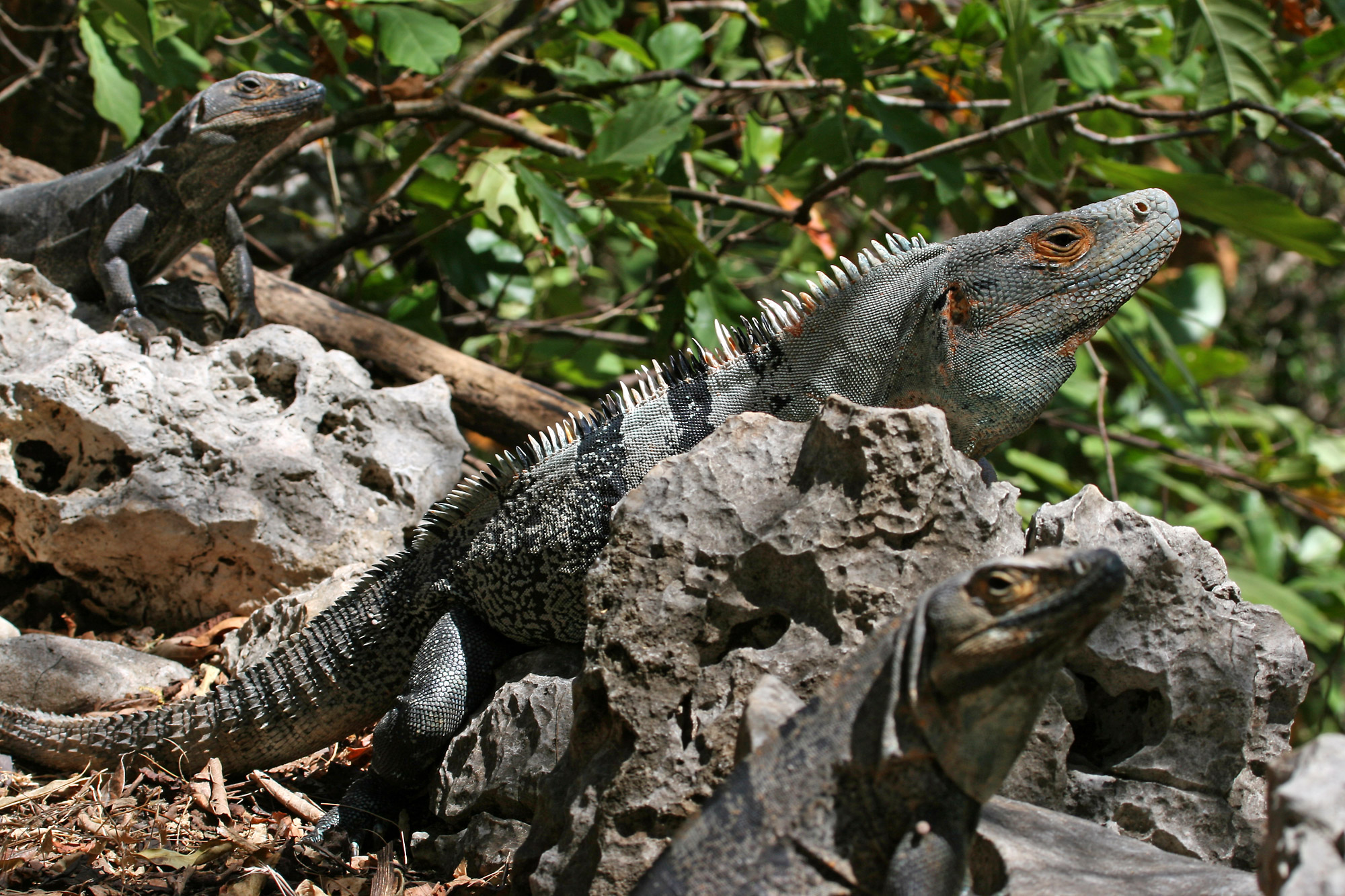
Ctenosaura similis

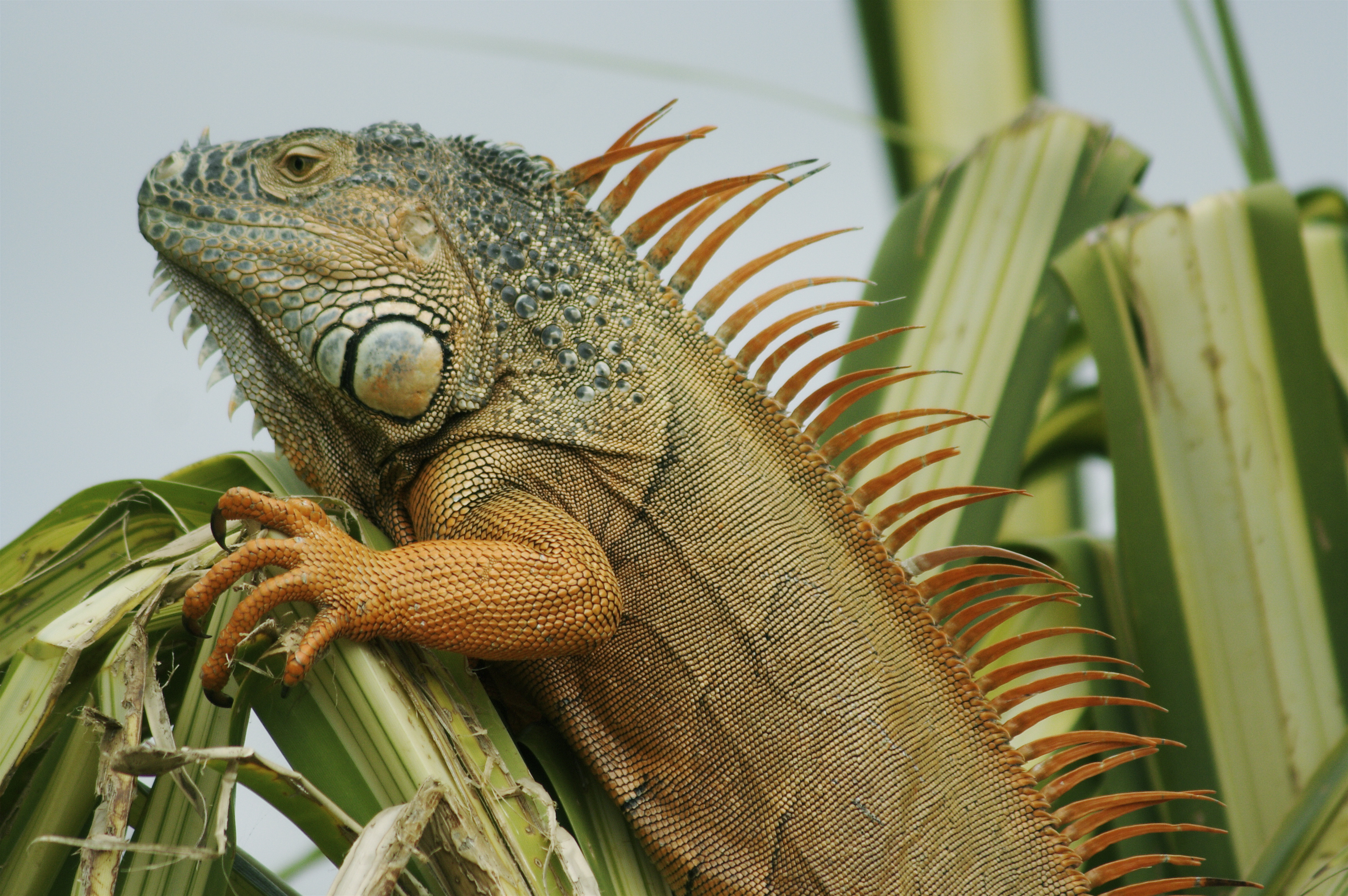
Iguana iguana

Order: Squamata · Family: Iguanidae

The iguanids (Iguanidae) are a family of lizards whose distribution extends from the southern United States, Central America to Paraguay, and from the Caribbean islands to the Galapagos Islands and Fiji. Iguanids can reach lengths that vary between 14 cm (5.5 in) and 200 cm (79 in). The tail is often longer than the rest of the body. They often have a dewlap that helps regulate body temperature, and dorsal spines that are more pronounced in males than in females. Some species are terrestrial, others prefer to live in trees or rocks. Males are usually territorial and defend their territory against other males, but tolerate females. All iguanas are oviparous. The nests are usually quite large, often several females lay their eggs in proximity to other nests to facilitate their defense against predators. Juveniles feed primarily on insects and other invertebrates, while adults, especially in larger species, switch to a primarily plant diet. 16 species of iguanids occur in Mexico.

- Ctenosaura acanthura (Shaw, 1802)
- Ctenosaura alfredschmidti Köhler, 1995 NT
- Ctenosaura clarki Bailey, 1928
- Ctenosaura defensor (Cope, 1866)
- Ctenosaura hemilopha (Cope, 1863)
- Ctenosaura oaxacana Köhler & Hasbun, 2001
- Ctenosaura pectinata (Wiegmann, 1834)
- Ctenosaura quinquecarinata (Gray, 1842)
- Ctenosaura similis (Gray, 1831)
- Dipsosaurus dorsalis (Baird & Girard, 1852)
- Iguana iguana (Linnaeus, 1758)
- Sauromalus ater Duméril, 1856
- Sauromalus hispidus Stejneger, 1891
- Sauromalus klauberi Shaw, 1941
- Sauromalus slevini Van Denburgh, 1922
- Sauromalus varius Dickerson, 1919

=== Phrynosomatidae ===
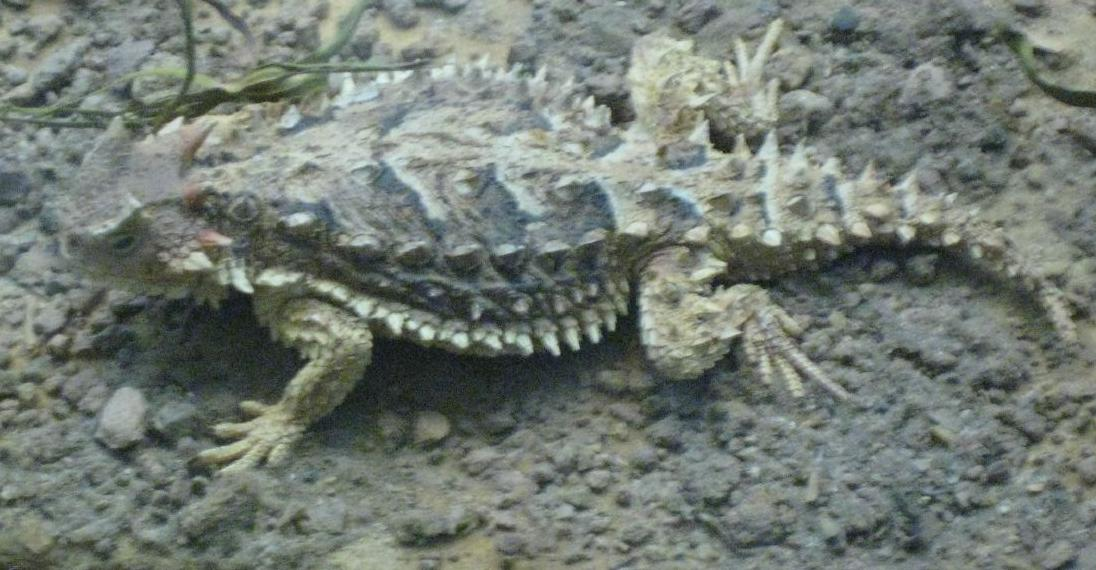
Phrynosoma asio

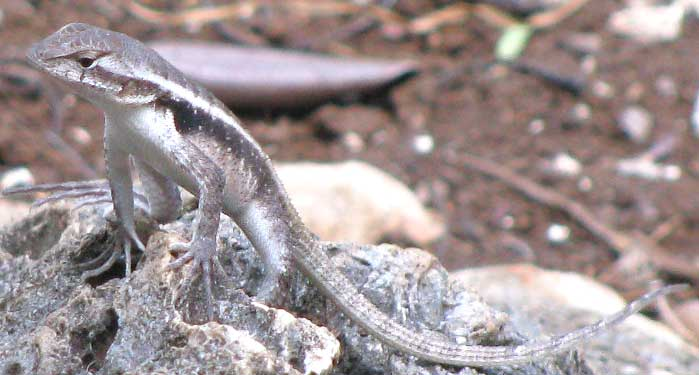
Sceloporus chrysostictus

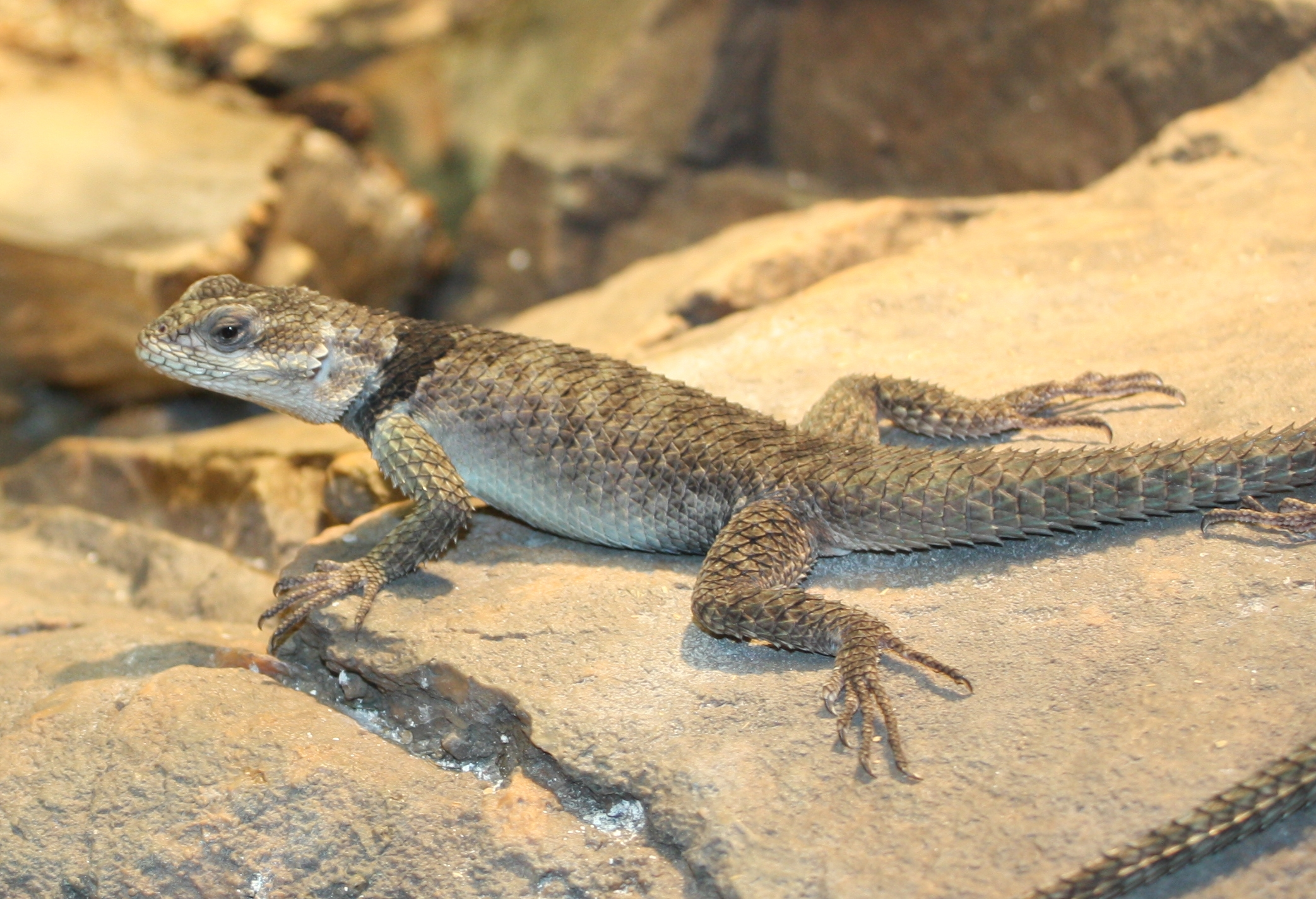
Sceloporus serrifer

Order: Squamata · Family: Phrynosomatidae

Phrynosomatids (Phrynosomatidae) are a family of lizards known as spiny lizards. They have a parietal eye, variable scales that range from stippled, keeled or non-keeled, to mucronate scales. They live among rocks, on the ground, in shrubby, arboreal vegetation, under logs or under rocks. Its range includes southern Canada, the United States, Mexico and Central America. There are 143 recognized species, 134 of which occur in Mexico.

- Callisaurus draconoides Blainville, 1835
- Cophosaurus texanus Troschel, 1852
- Holbrookia elegans Bocourt, 1874
- Holbrookia lacerata Cope, 1880
- Holbrookia maculata Girard, 1851
- Holbrookia propinqua Baird & Girard, 1852
- Petrosaurus mearnsi (Stejneger, 1894)
- Petrosaurus repens (Van Denburgh, 1895)
- Petrosaurus thalassinus (Cope, 1863)
- Phrynosoma asio Cope, 1864
- Phrynosoma blainvillii Gray, 1839
- Phrynosoma braconnieri Duméril & Bocourt, 1870
- Phrynosoma cerroense Stejneger, 1893
- Phrynosoma cornutum (Harlan, 1824)
- Phrynosoma coronatum (Blainville, 1835)
- Phrynosoma ditmarsi Stejneger, 1906
- Phrynosoma douglasii (Bell, 1828)
- Phrynosoma goodei Stejneger, 1893
- Phrynosoma hernandesi Girard, 1858
- Phrynosoma mcallii (Hallowell, 1852)
- Phrynosoma modestum Girard, 1852
- Phrynosoma orbiculare (Linnaeus, 1758)
- Phrynosoma platyrhinos Girard, 1852
- Phrynosoma solare Gray, 1845
- Phrynosoma taurus Dugès, 1873
- Phrynosoma wigginsi Montanucci, 2004
- Sceloporus acanthinus Bocourt, 1873
- Sceloporus adleri Smith & Savitzky, 1974
- Sceloporus aeneus Wiegmann, 1828
- Sceloporus albiventris Smith, 1939
- Sceloporus anahuacus Lara-Gongara, 1983
- Sceloporus angustus (Dickerson, 1919)
- Sceloporus arenicolus Degenhardt & Jones, 1972
- Sceloporus asper Boulenger, 1897
- Sceloporus bicanthalis Smith, 1937
- Sceloporus bimaculosus Phelan & Brattstrom, 1955
- Sceloporus bulleri Boulenger, 1894
- Sceloporus caeruleus Smith, 1936
- Sceloporus carinatus Smith, 1936
- Sceloporus cautus Smith, 1938
- Sceloporus chaneyi Liner & Dixon, 1992
- Sceloporus chrysostictus Cope, 1866
- Sceloporus clarkii Baird & Girard, 1852
- Sceloporus consobrinus Baird & Girard, 1853
- Sceloporus couchii Baird, 1859
- Sceloporus cowlesi Lowe & Norris, 1956
- Sceloporus cozumelae Jones, 1927
- Sceloporus cryptus Smith & Lynch, 1967
- Sceloporus cupreus Bocourt, 1873
- Sceloporus cyanogenys Cope, 1885
- Sceloporus cyanostictus Axtell & Axtell, 1971
- Sceloporus druckercolini Pérez-Ramos & Saldana de la Riva, 2008
- Sceloporus dugesii Bocourt, 1873
- Sceloporus edwardtaylori Smith, 1936
- Sceloporus exsul Dixon, Ketchersid & Lieb, 1972
- Sceloporus formosus Wiegmann, 1834
- Sceloporus gadoviae Boulenger, 1905
- Sceloporus goldmani Smith, 1937
- Sceloporus graciosus Baird & Girard, 1852
- Sceloporus grammicus Wiegmann, 1828
- Sceloporus grandaevus (Dickerson, 1919)
- Sceloporus heterolepis Boulenger, 1894
- Sceloporus horridus Wiegmann, 1834
- Sceloporus hunsakeri Hall & Smith, 1979
- Sceloporus insignis Webb, 1967
- Sceloporus internasalis Smith & Bumzahem, 1955
- Sceloporus jalapae Günther, 1890
- Sceloporus jarrovii Cope, 1875
- Sceloporus lemosespinali Lara-Góngara, 2004
- Sceloporus licki Van Denburgh, 1895
- Sceloporus lineatulus Dickerson, 1919
- Sceloporus lundelli Smith, 1939
- Sceloporus macdougalli Smith & Bumzahem, 1953
- Sceloporus maculosus Smith, 1934
- Sceloporus magister Hallowell, 1854
- Sceloporus malachiticus Cope, 1864
- Sceloporus megalepidurus Smith, 1934
- Sceloporus melanorhinus Bocourt, 1876
- Sceloporus merriami Stejneger, 1904
- Sceloporus minor Cope, 1885
- Sceloporus mucronatus Cope, 1885
- Sceloporus nelsoni Cochran, 1923
- Sceloporus occidentalis Baird & Girard, 1852
- Sceloporus ochoterenae Smith, 1934
- Sceloporus olivaceus Smith, 1934
- Sceloporus orcutti Stejneger, 1893
- Sceloporus ornatus Baird, 1859
- Sceloporus palaciosi Lara-Góngara, 1983
- Sceloporus parvus Smith, 1934
- Sceloporus poinsettii Baird & Girard, 1852
- Sceloporus pyrocephalus Cope, 1864
- Sceloporus salvini Günther, 1890
- Sceloporus samcolemani Smith & Hall, 1974
- Sceloporus scalaris Wiegmann, 1828
- Sceloporus serrifer Cope, 1866
- Sceloporus shannonorum Langebartel, 1959
- Sceloporus siniferus Cope, 1870
- Sceloporus slevini Smith, 1937
- Sceloporus smaragdinus Bocourt, 1873
- Sceloporus smithi artweg & Oliver, 1937
- Sceloporus spinosus Wiegmann, 1828
- Sceloporus squamosus Bocourt, 1874
- Sceloporus stejnegeri Smith, 1942
- Sceloporus subpictus Lynch & Smith, 1965
- Sceloporus sugillatus Smith, 1942
- Sceloporus taeniocnemis Cope, 1885
- Sceloporus tanneri Smith & Larsen, 1975
- Sceloporus teapensis Günther, 1890
- Sceloporus torquatus Wiegmann, 1828
- Sceloporus tristichus (Cope, 1875)
- Sceloporus undulatus (Bosc & Daudin, 1801)
- Sceloporus utiformis Cope, 1864
- Sceloporus variabilis Wiegmann, 1834
- Sceloporus virgatus Smith, 1938
- Sceloporus zosteromus Cope, 1863
- Uma exsul Schmidt & Bogert, 1947
- Uma notata Baird, 1858
- Uma paraphygas Williams, Chrapliwy & Smith, 1959
- Urosaurus auriculatus (Cope, 1871)
- Urosaurus bicarinatus (Duméril, 1856)
- Urosaurus clarionensis (Townsend, 1890)
- Urosaurus gadovi (Schmidt, 1921)
- Urosaurus graciosus Hallowell, 1854
- Urosaurus irregularis (Fischer, 1881)
- Urosaurus lahtelai Rau & Loomis, 1977
- Urosaurus nigricaudus (Cope, 1864)
- Urosaurus ornatus (Baird & Girard, 1852)
- Uta encantadae Grismer, 1994
- Uta lowei Grismer, 1994
- Uta nolascensis Van Denburgh & Slevin, 1921
- Uta palmeri Stejneger, 1890
- Uta squamata Dickerson, 1919
- Uta stansburiana Baird & Girard, 1852
- Uta tumidarostra Grismer, 1994

=== Dactyloidae ===
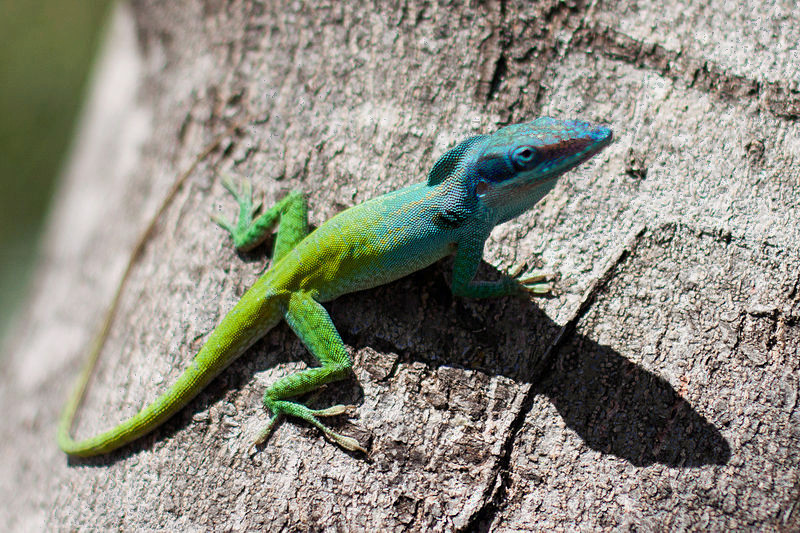
Anolis allisoni

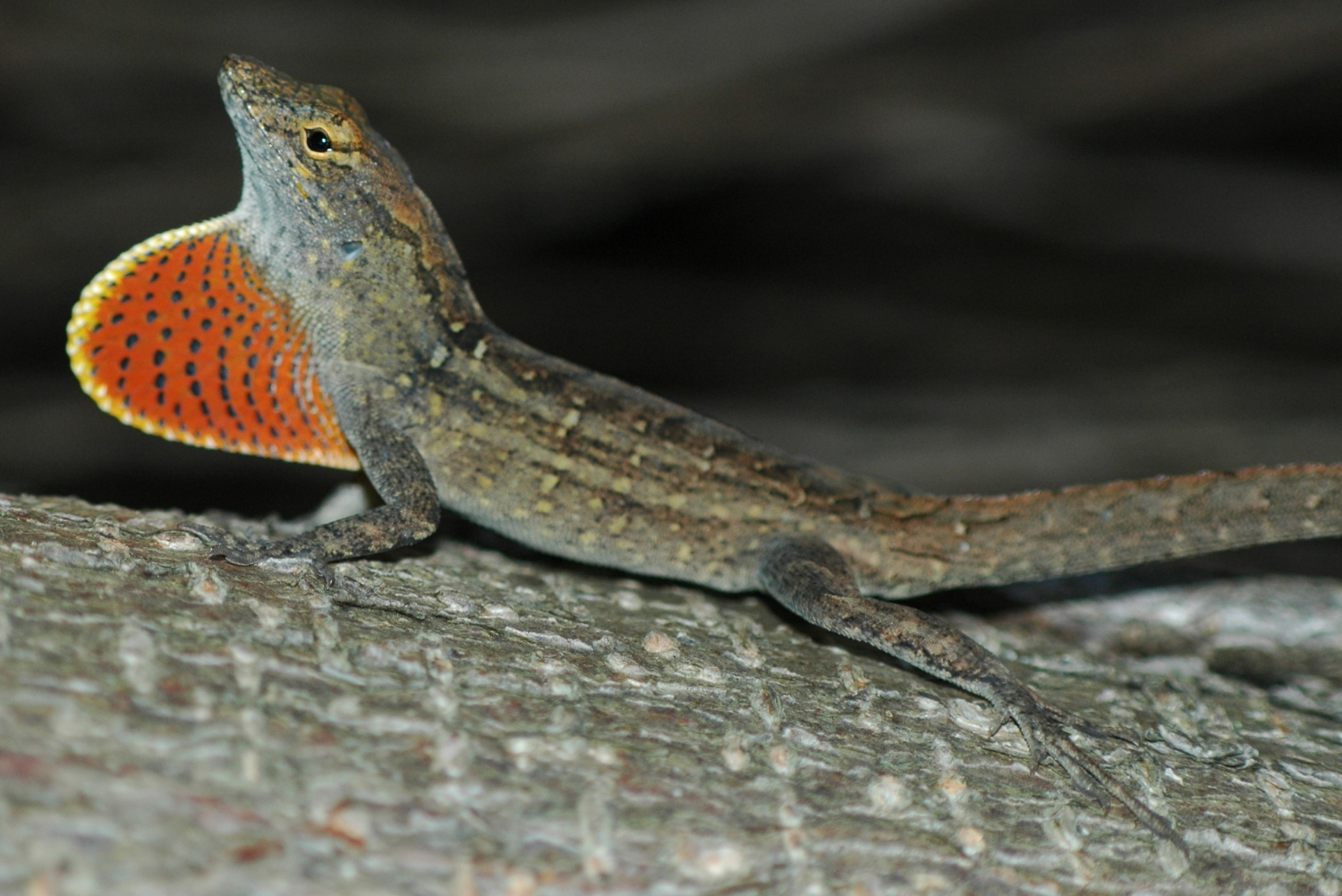
Anolis sagrei

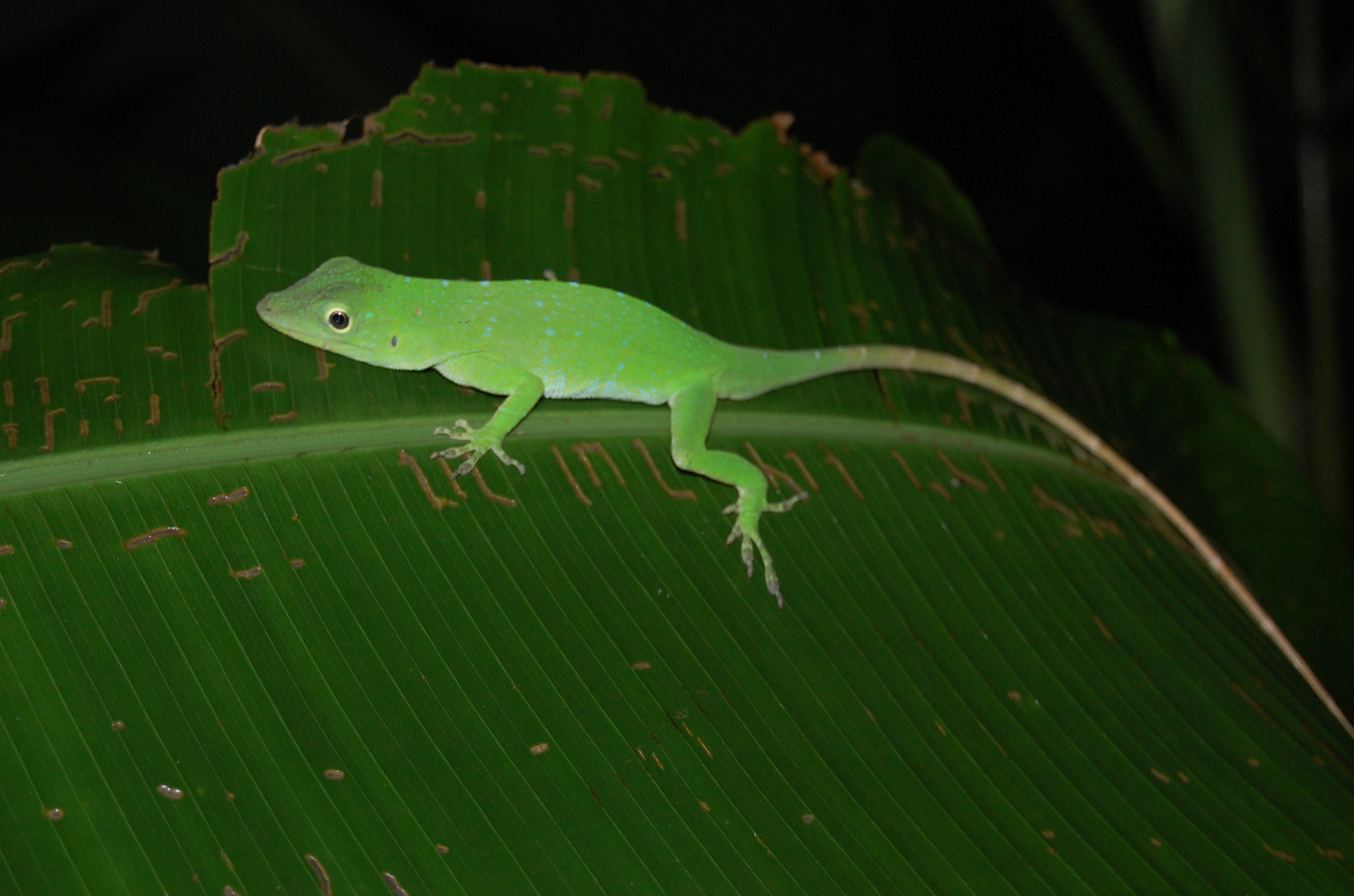
Anolis biporcatus

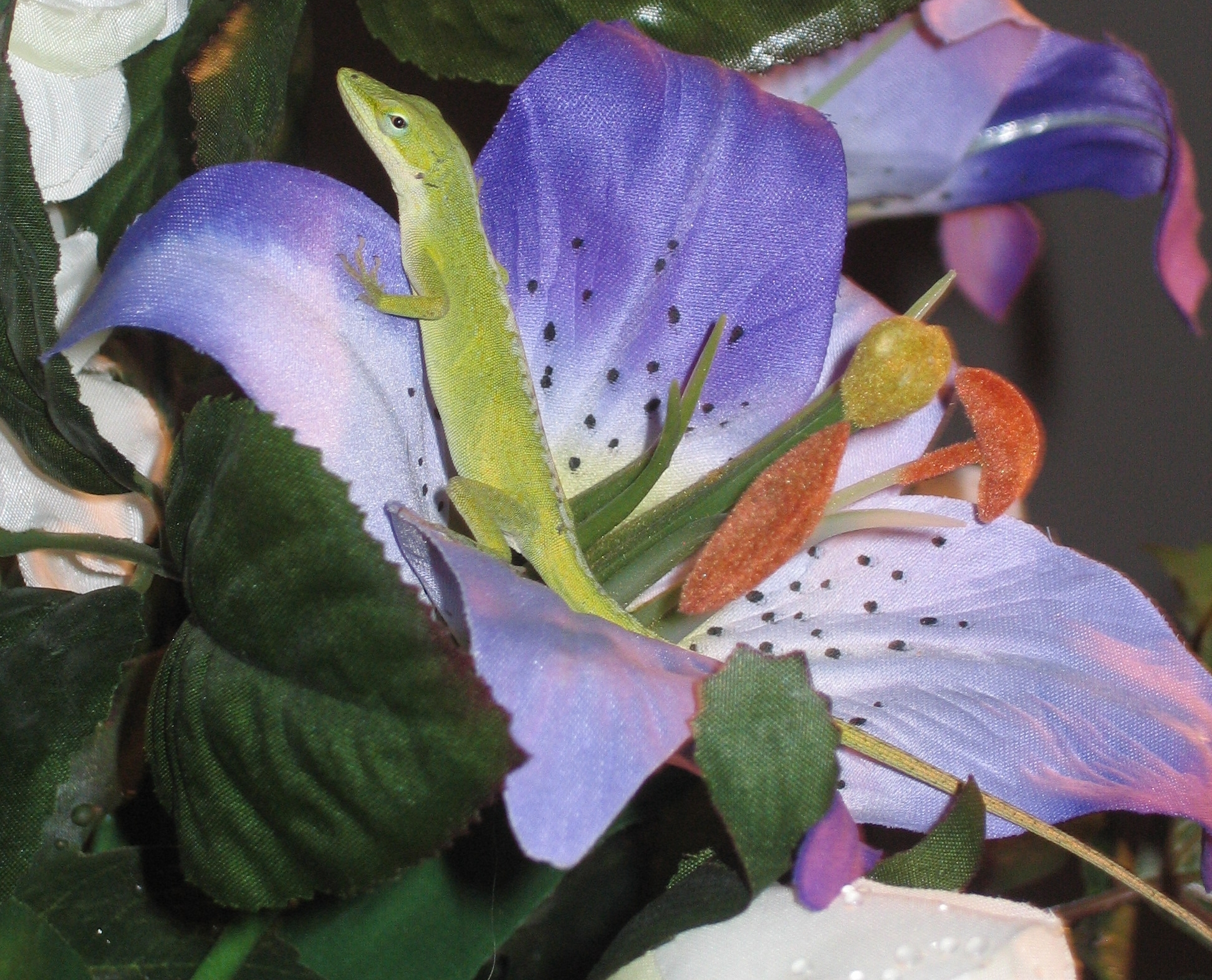
Anolis carolinensis

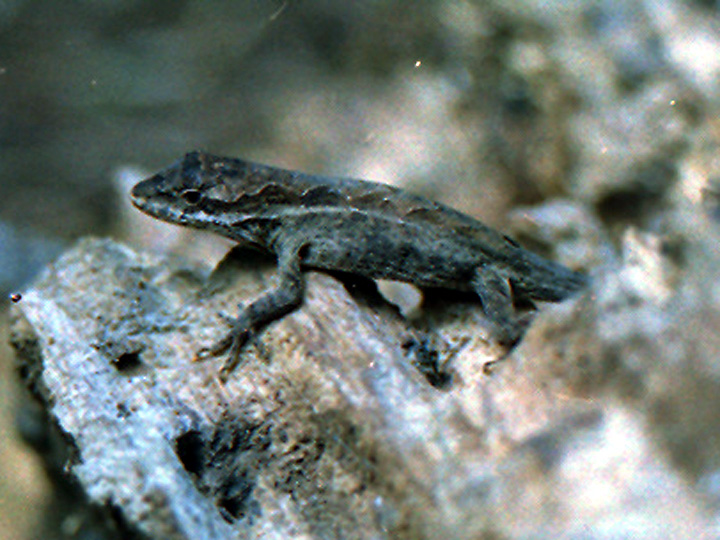
Anolis crassulus

Order: Squamata · Family: Dactyloidae

Dactyloidae is a family of lizards commonly known as anoles. They are small lizards native to the American continent, from the southeastern United States, the Caribbean, Central America to South America. They are characterized by having a parietal eye; most have a greenish color and a very long tail. Adult males exhibit a brightly colored fold of skin in the gular region. They feed on insects, mainly crickets. The majority is arboreal. They are very territorial animals. There are around 390 species recognized on the American continent, and 55 species that occur in Mexico.

- Anolis allisoni Barbour, 1928
- Anolis alvarezdeltoroi Nieto Montes de Oca, 1996
- Anolis anisolepis Smith, Burley & Fritts, 1968
- Anolis barkeri (Schmidt, 1939)
- Anolis beckeri Boulenger, 1881
- Anolis biporcatus (Wiegmann, 1834)
- Anolis capito Peters, 1863
- Anolis carolinensis Voigt, 1832
- Anolis cobanensis Stuart, 1942
- Anolis compressicauda Smith & Kerster, 1955
- Anolis crassulus Cope, 1864
- Anolis cristatellus Duméril & Bibron 1837
- Anolis cristifer Smith, 1968
- Anolis cuprinus Smith, 1964
- Anolis cymbops Cope, 1864
- Anolis damulus Cope, 1864
- Anolis dollfusianus Bocourt, 1873
- Anolis duellmani (Fitch & Henderson, 1973)
- Anolis dunni Smith, 1936
- Anolis forbesorum Smith & Van Gelder, 1955
- Anolis gadovii Boulenger, 1905
- Anolis hobartsmithi Nieto-Montes de Oca, 2001
- Anolis isthmicus Fitch, 1978
- Anolis laeviventris (Wiegmann, 1834)
- Anolis lemurinus Cope, 1861
- Anolis limifrons Cope, 1862
- Anolis liogaster Boulenger, 1905
- Anolis macrinii Smith, 1968
- Anolis matudai Smith, 1956
- Anolis megapholidotus Smith, 1933
- Anolis microlepidotus Davis, 1954
- Anolis microlepis Álvarez del Toro & Smith, 1956
- Anolis milleri Smith, 1950
- Anolis naufragus (Campbell, Hillis & Lamar, 1989)
- Anolis nebuloides Bocourt, 1873
- Anolis nebulosus (Wiegmann, 1834)
- Anolis omiltemanus Davis, 1954
- Anolis parvicirculatus Álvarez del Toro & Smith, 1956
- Anolis pentaprion Cope, 1863
- Anolis petersii Bocourt, 1873
- Anolis peucephilus Köhler, Trejo-Pérez, Petersen, Mendez de la Cruz, 2014
- Anolis pygmaeus Álvarez del Toro & Smith, 1956
- Anolis quercorum Fitch, 1978
- Anolis rodriguezi Bocourt, 1873
- Anolis rubiginosus Bocourt, 1873
- Anolis sagrei Duméril & Bibron 1837
- Anolis schiedei (Wiegmann, 1834)
- Anolis sericeus Hallowell, 1856
- Anolis serranoi (Köhler, 1999)
- Anolis subocularis Davis, 1954
- Anolis taylori Smith & Spieler, 1945
- Anolis tropidonotus Peters, 1863
- Anolis uniformis Cope, 1885
- Anolis unilobatus Köhler & Vesely, 2010
- Anolis utowanae Barbour, 1932

=== Scincidae ===
Order: Squamata · Family: Scincidae

Skinks (Scincidae) are one of the most diverse families of lizards. Includes skinks or skinks. It belongs to the superfamily or infraorder Scincomorpha, which also includes the true lizards (Lacertidae). The Scincidae family has a global distribution and consists of 1578 species. 32 species occur in Mexico.

- Mesoscincus altamirani (Dugès, 1891)
- Mesoscincus schwartzei (Fischer, 1884)
- Plestiodon bilineatus (Tanner, 1958)
- Plestiodon brevirostris (Günther, 1860)
- Plestiodon callicephalus (Bocourt, 1879)
- Plestiodon colimensis (Taylor, 1935)
- Plestiodon copei (Taylor, 1933)
- Plestiodon dicei (Taylor, 1936)
- Plestiodon dugesii (Thominot, 1883)
- Plestiodon gilberti (Van Denburgh, 1896)
- Plestiodon indubitus (Taylor, 1936)
- Plestiodon lagunensis (Van Denburgh, 1895)
- Plestiodon lynxe (Wiegmann, 1834)
- Plestiodon multilineatus (Tanner, 1957)
- Plestiodon multivirgatus Hallowell, 1857
- Plestiodon nietoi Feria-Ortiz & García-Vázquez, 2012
- Plestiodon obsoletus Baird & Girard, 1852
- Plestiodon ochoterenae (Taylor, 1933)
- Plestiodon parviauriculatus (Taylor, 1933)
- Plestiodon parvulus (Taylor, 1933)
- Plestiodon skiltonianus Baird & Girard, 1852
- Plestiodon sumichrasti (Cope, 1867)
- Plestiodon tetragrammus Baird, 1859
- Scincella assata (Cope, 1864)
- Scincella caudaequinae (Smith, 1951)
- Scincella cherriei (Cope, 1893)
- Scincella forbesorum (Taylor, 1937)
- Scincella gemmingeri (Cope, 1864)
- Scincella incerta (Stuart, 1940)
- Scincella kikaapoa García-Vázquez, Canseco-Márquez & Nieto-Montes de Oca, 2010
- Scincella lateralis (Say, 1823)
- Scincella silvicola (Taylor, 1937)

=== Teiidae ===
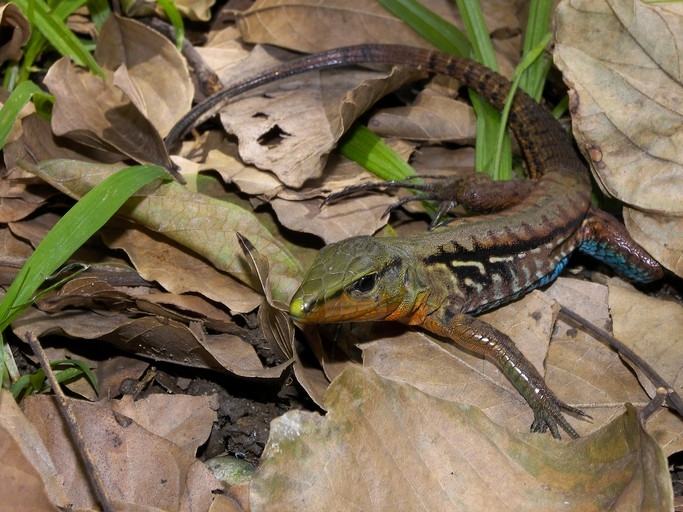
Holcosus festivus

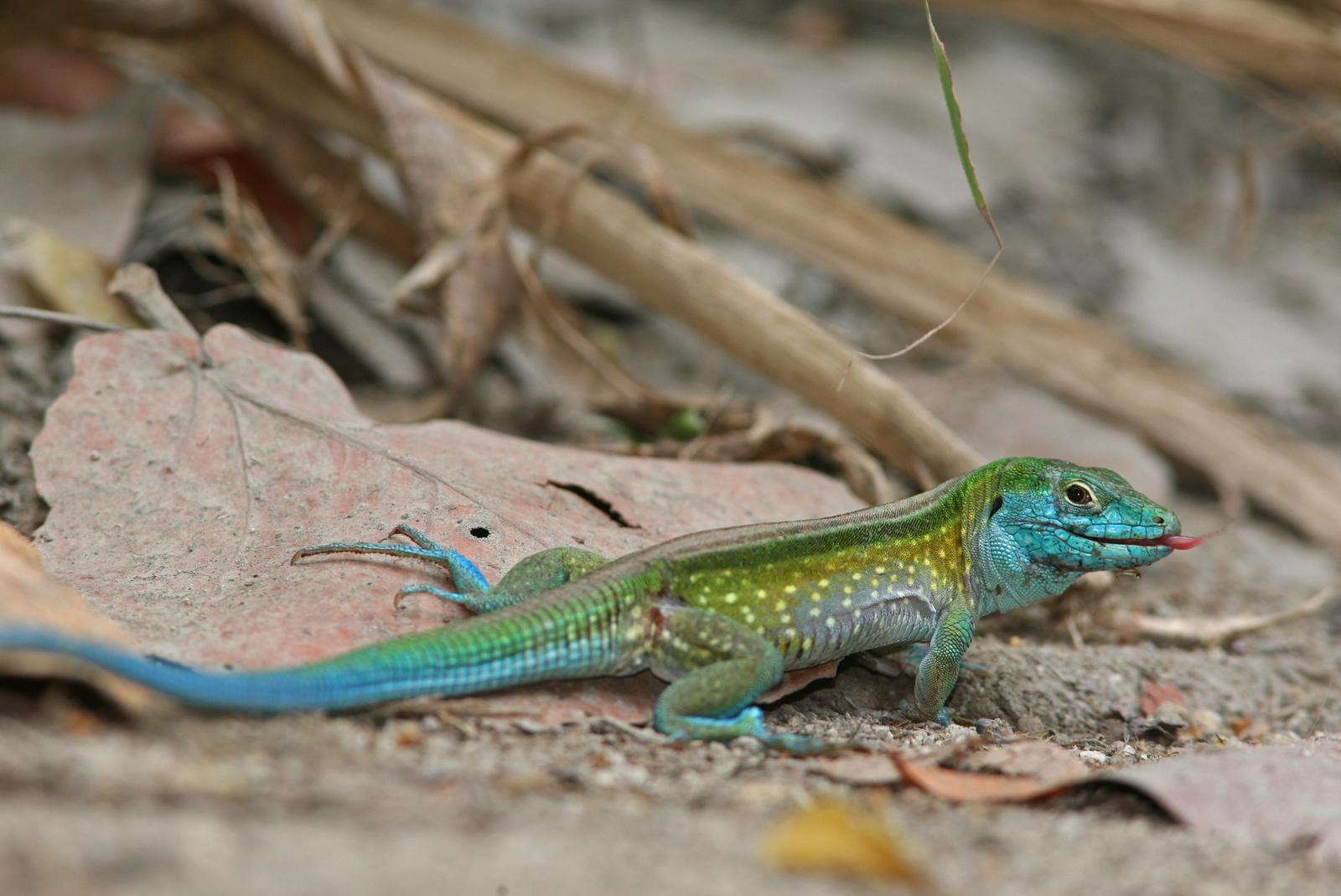
Holcosus undulatus

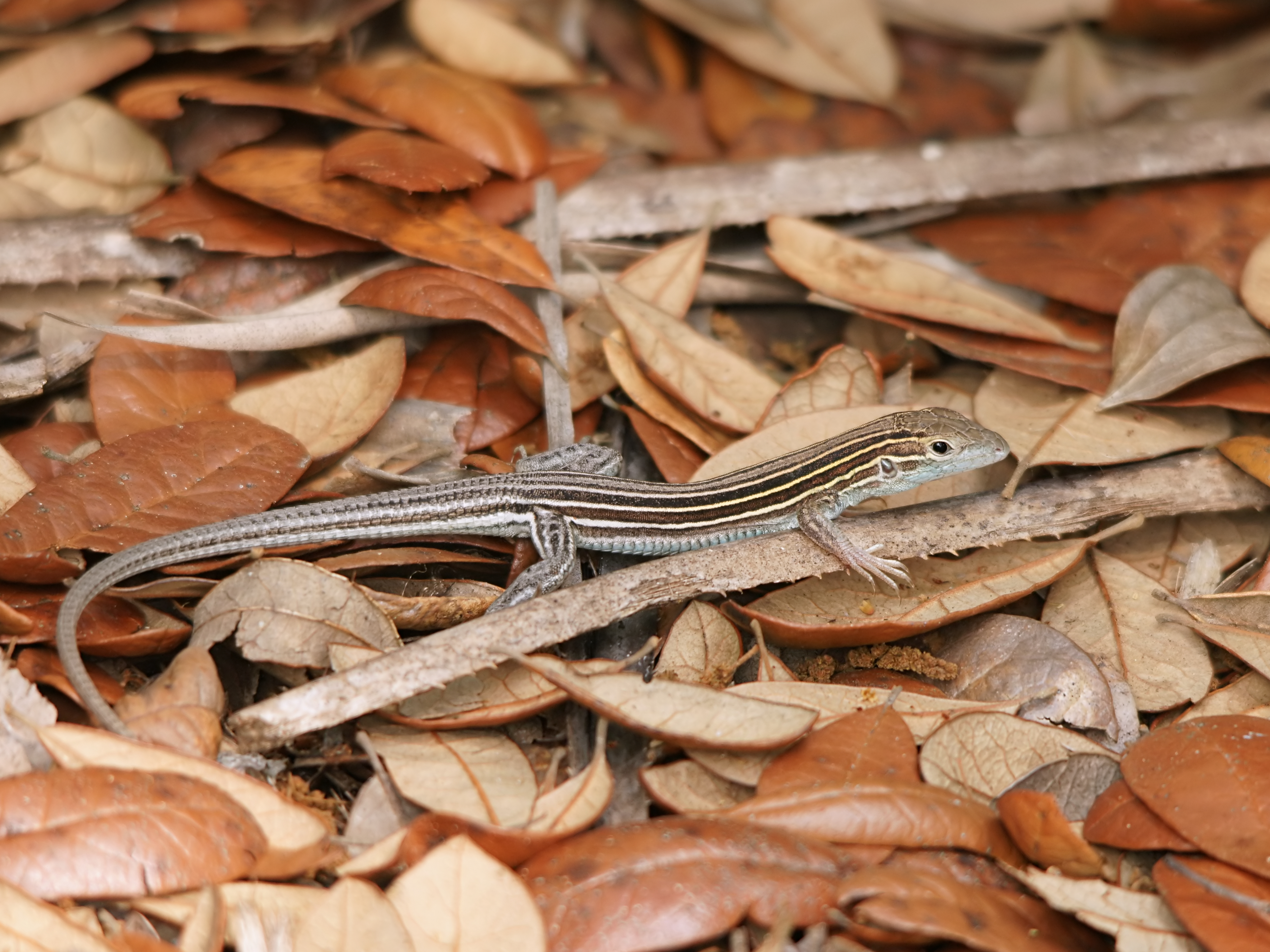
Aspidoscelis sexlineata

Order: Squamata · Family: Teiidae

The teiids (Teiidae) are a family of lizards with elongated bodies, well-developed limbs, provided with granular dorsal scales, large rectangular ventral plates and large plates on the head. All teiids have a forked tongue, similar to that of a snake. They are terrestrial and diurnal, and mainly insectivorous, although some species also feed on a small amount of plant matter. There are 144 recognized species, of which 41 occur in Mexico.

- Aspidoscelis angusticeps (Cope, 1878)
- Aspidoscelis burti (Taylor, 1938)
- Aspidoscelis calidipes (Duellman, 1955)
- Aspidoscelis ceralbensis (Van Denburgh & Slevin, 1921)
- Aspidoscelis communis (Cope, 1878)
- Aspidoscelis costatus (Cope, 1878)
- Aspidoscelis cozumelae (Gadow, 1906)
- Aspidoscelis danheimae (Burt, 1929)
- Aspidoscelis deppei (Wiegmann, 1834)
- Aspidoscelis exsanguis (Lowe, 1956)
- Aspidoscelis flagellicaudus (Lowe & Wright, 1964)
- Aspidoscelis gularis (Baird & Girard, 1852)
- Aspidoscelis guttatus (Wiegmann, 1834)
- Aspidoscelis hyperythra (Cope, 1864)
- Aspidoscelis inornata (Baird, 1859)
- Aspidoscelis labialis (Stejneger, 1890)
- Aspidoscelis laredoensis (McKinney, Kay & Anderson, 1973)
- Aspidoscelis lineattissimus (Cope, 1878)
- Aspidoscelis marmoratus (Baird & Girard, 1852)
- Aspidoscelis maslini (Fritts, 1969)
- Aspidoscelis maximus (Cope, 1864)
- Aspidoscelis mexicanus (Peters, 1869)
- Aspidoscelis motaguae (Sackett, 1941)
- Aspidoscelis neomexicana (Lowe & Zweifel, 1952)
- Aspidoscelis opatae (Wright, 1967)
- Aspidoscelis parvisocius (Zweifel, 1960)
- Aspidoscelis pictus (Van Denburgh & Slevin, 1921)
- Aspidoscelis rodecki (McCoy & Maslin, 1962)
- Aspidoscelis sackii (Wiegmann, 1834)
- Aspidoscelis scalaris (Cope, 1892)
- Aspidoscelis sexlineata (Linnaeus, 1766)
- Aspidoscelis sonorae (Lowe & Wright, 1964)
- Aspidoscelis stictogrammus (Burger, 1950)
- Aspidoscelis tesselata (Say, 1823)
- Aspidoscelis tigris (Baird & Girard, 1852)
- Aspidoscelis uniparens (Wright & Lowe, 1965)
- Aspidoscelis velox (Springer, 1928)
- Cnemidophorus martyris Stejneger, 1891
- Holcosus chaitzami (Stuart, 1942)
- Holcosus festivus (Lichtenstein, 1856)
- Holcosus undulatus (Wiegmann, 1834)

=== Gymnophthalmidae ===
Order: Squamata · Family: Iguanidae

Gymnophthalmidae is a family of lizards commonly known as microtheids. They have transparent lower eyelids that allow them to see with their eyes closed. They are related to the tiiids, but due to their smooth scales they are more similar to scincids. They are generally small lizards, and many species have reduced limbs. They live in a wide variety of habitats - including desert, mountains, and rainforest - throughout Central and South America. They generally inhabit the forest floor or humid areas associated with tropical forests. They are nocturnal animals or are active intermittently during the day. They feed mainly on insects and other invertebrates. All species are oviparous. The family is made up of more than 240 species grouped into 40 genera. A species occurs in Mexico.

- Gymnophthalmus speciosus (Hallowell, 1871)

=== Xantusiidae ===
Order: Squamata · Family: Xantusiidae

The xanthusids (Xantusiidae) are a family of small lizards that are distributed in the southeastern United States, Mexico, and Central America. There are 34 recognized species; 27 occur in Mexico.

- Lepidophyma chicoasensis Álvarez & Valentin, 1988
- Lepidophyma cuicateca Canseco-Marquez, Guttierez-Mayen & Mendoza-Hernández, 2008
- Lepidophyma dontomasi (Smith, 1942)
- Lepidophyma flavimaculatum Duméril, 1851
- Lepidophyma gaigeae Mosauer, 1936
- Lepidophyma lineri Smith, 1973
- Lepidophyma lipetzi Smith & del Toro, 1977
- Lepidophyma lowei Bezy & Camarillo, 1997
- Lepidophyma mayae Bezy, 1973 NT
- Lepidophyma micropholis Walker, 1955
- Lepidophyma occulor Smith, 1942
- Lepidophyma pajapanensis Werler, 1957
- Lepidophyma radula (Smith, 1942)
- Lepidophyma smithii Bocourt, 1876
- Lepidophyma sylvaticum Taylor, 1939
- Lepidophyma tarascae Bezy, Webb & Álvarez, 1982
- Lepidophyma tuxtlae Werler & Shannon, 1957
- Lepidophyma zongolica García-Vázquez, Canseco-Marquez & Aguilar-López, 2010
- Xantusia bolsonae Webb, 1970
- Xantusia extorris Webb, 1965
- Xantusia gilberti Van Denburgh, 1895
- Xantusia henshawi Stejneger, 1893
- Xantusia jaycolei Bezy, Bezy & Bolles, 2008
- Xantusia sanchezi Bezy & Flores-Villela, 1999
- Xantusia sherbrookei Bezy, Bezy & Bolles, 2008
- Xantusia vigilis Baird, 1859
- Xantusia wigginsi Savage, 1952

=== Xenosauridae ===
Order: Squamata · Family: Xenosauridae

Xenosauridae is a monotypic family of lizards native to Mexico and Central America that consists of 10 recognized species. 10 species occur in Mexico.

- Xenosaurus agrenon King & Thompson, 1968
- Xenosaurus grandis (Gray, 1856)
- Xenosaurus mendozai Nieto-Montes de Oca, García-Vázquez, Zúñiga-Vega & Schmidt-Ballardo, 2013
- Xenosaurus newmanorum Taylor, 1949
- Xenosaurus penai Pérez Ramos, de la Riva & Campbell, 2000
- Xenosaurus phalaroanthereon Nieto-Montes de Oca, Campbell & Flores-Villela, 2001
- Xenosaurus platyceps King & Thompson, 1968
- Xenosaurus rackhami Stuart, 1941
- Xenosaurus rectocollaris Smith & Iverson, 1993
- Xenosaurus tzacualtipantecus Woolrich-Piña & Smith, 2012

== Snakes (Squamata - suborder Serpentes) ==
Mexico has about 396 species of snakes, grouped into 10 families. The majority of snakes belong to the families of the dipsadidae (Dipsadidae) with 130 species and the colubrids (Colubridae) with 134 species, followed by the viperids (Viperidae) (59 species) and the elapids (Elapidae) (19 species).

=== Anomalepididae ===
Order: Squamata · Family: Anomalepididae

- Anomalepis mexicanus JAN, 1860

=== Leptotyphlopidae ===
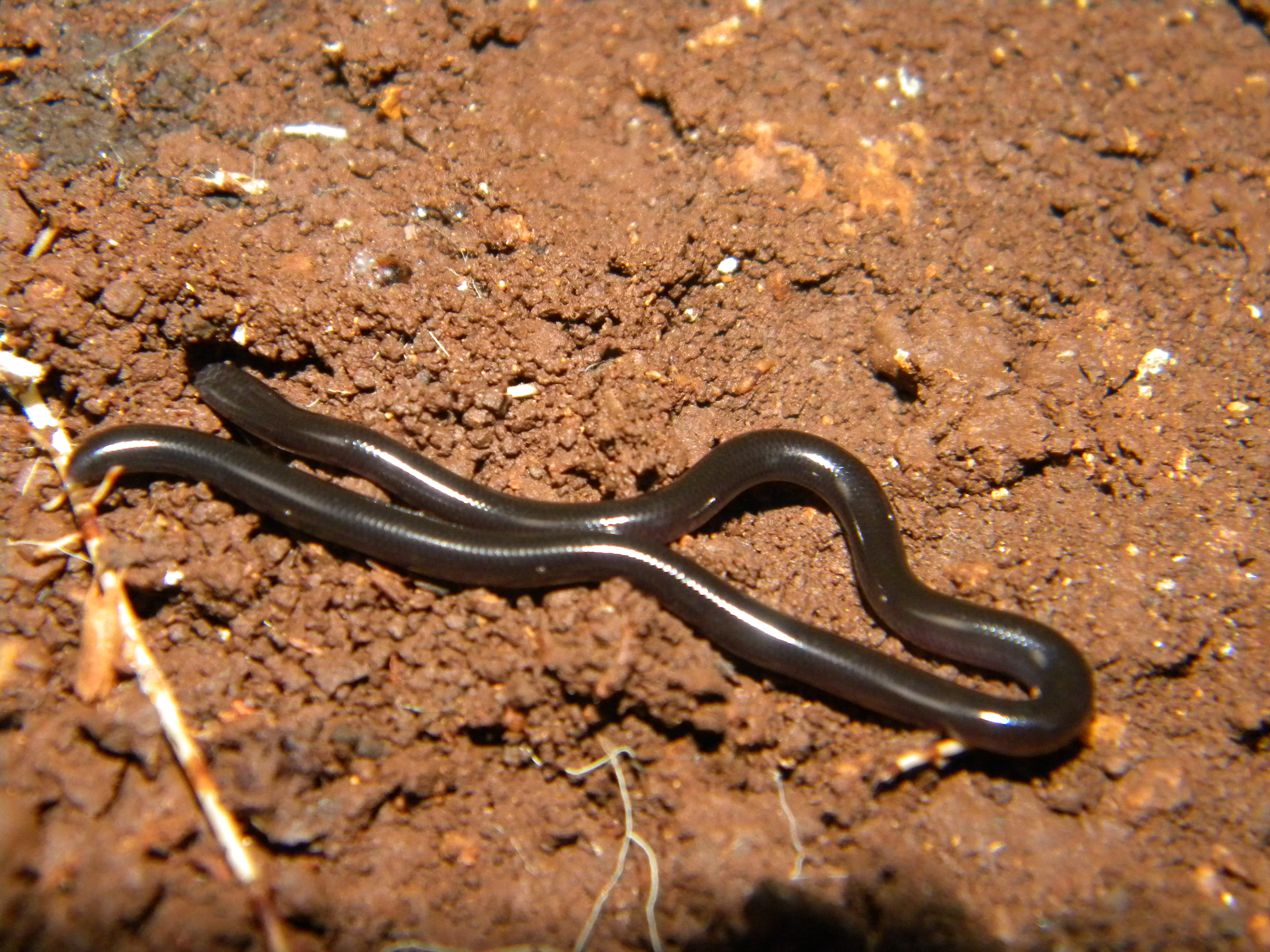
Epictia goudotii

Order: Squamata · Family: Leptotyphlopidae

Leptotyphlopids (Leptotyphlopidae) are a family of snakes native to America, Africa and Asia. They are burrowing snakes that feed on ants and termites. They are relatively small and rarely exceed 30 cm (12 in) in length. The body is cylindrical with polished scales, a blunt head and a short tail. They produce pheromones that protect them against termite attacks. 2 genera are recognized that include 87 species. 9 species occur in Mexico.

- Epictia goudotii (Duméril & Bibron, 1844)
- Epictia magnamaculata (Taylor, 1940)
- Rena boettgeri (Werner, 1899)
- Rena bressoni (Taylor, 1939)
- Rena dissecta (Cope, 1896)
- Rena dulcis Baird & Girard, 1853
- Rena humilis Baird & Girard, 1853
- Rena maxima (Loveridge, 1932)
- Rena myopica (Garman, 1884)

=== Typhlopidae ===
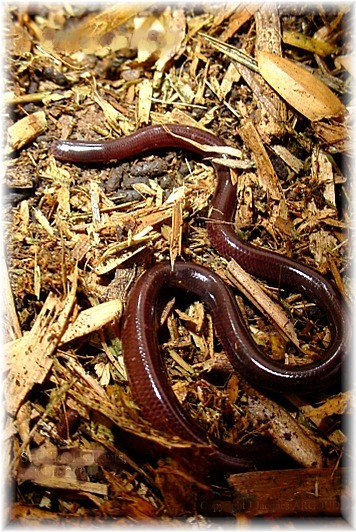
Ramphotyphlops braminus

Order: Squamata · Family: Typhlopidae

Typhlopids (Typhlopidae) are a family of blind snakes that mainly inhabit the tropical regions of Africa, America, Asia, and Australia. They live in burrows, and since they have no use for vision, their eyes are reduced to vestiges, although they can detect light. They have teeth in the upper jaw. The tail ends with a horn-shaped scale. Most of these species are oviparous. 6 genera are recognized, containing 203 species. 3 species occur in Mexico.

- Amerotyphlops microstomus (Cope, 1866)
- Amerotyphlops tenuis (Salvin, 1860)
- Indotyphlops braminus (Daudin, 1803)

=== Boidae ===
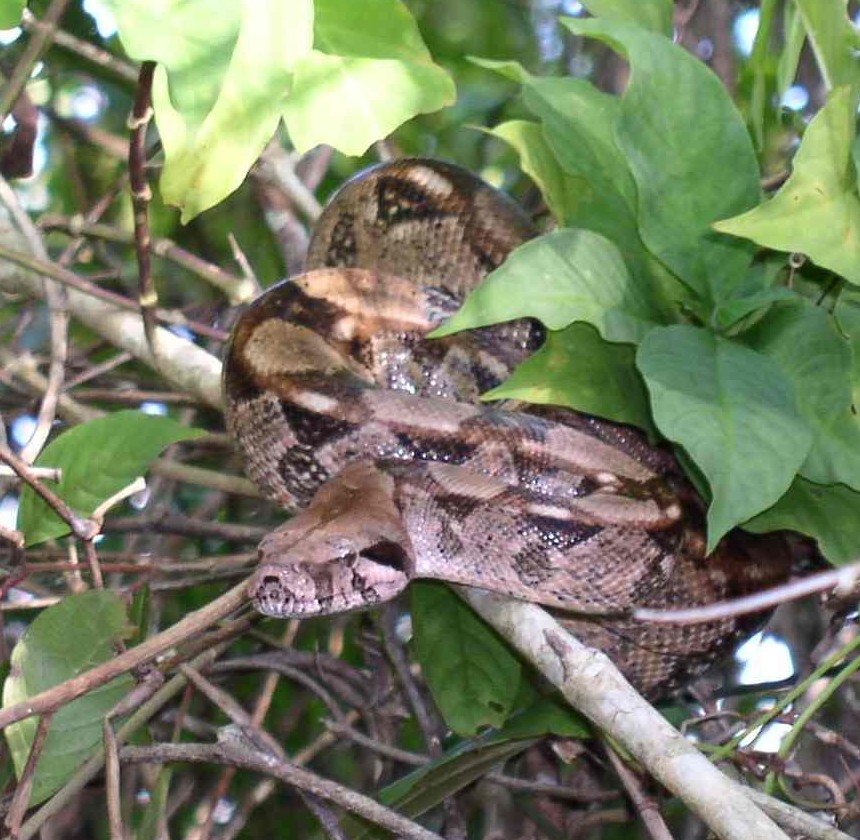
Boa constrictor

Order: Squamata · Family: Boidae

Boids or boas (Boidae) are a family of non-venomous snakes, native to America, Africa, Europe, Asia and some Pacific islands. They are constrictor snakes, meaning they kill their prey by constriction, enclosing them in their rings, applying and maintaining enough pressure to inhibit inhalation; The prey finally succumbs to suffocation. 43 species are distinguished, grouped into 2 subfamilies and 8 genera. 4 species occur in Mexico.

- Boa constrictor Linnaeus, 1758
- Exiliboa placata Bogert, 1968
- Lichanura trivirgata Cope, 1861
- Ungaliophis continentalis Müller, 1880

=== Loxocemidae ===
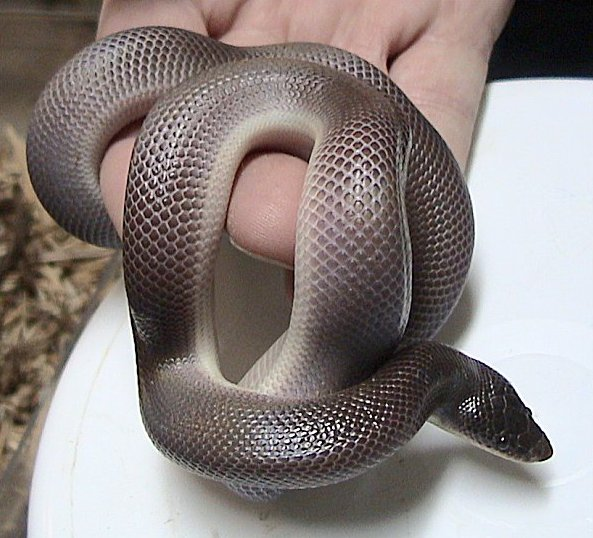
Loxocemus bicolor

Order: Squamata · Family: Loxocemidae

The loxocemids (Loxocemidae) are a family of constrictor snakes. This family consists of a single genus (Loxocemus) and a single species Loxocemus bicolor. It can reach a length of 157 cm (62 in), but usually measures 77 to 100 cm (30 to 39 in). It has a triangular head, a fairly robust cylindrical body, a little flattened dorsoventrally in the posterior region; short and conical tail. The eyes are small; The scales are wide and smooth, all similar except for a slightly elongated ventral row. They have vestiges of a pelvic girdle and a claw-shaped structure like in boids. They are excavators, but not as specialized. They are only found in specific areas of the rainforests of Mexico and Central America.

- Loxocemus bicolor Cope, 1861

=== Colubridae ===
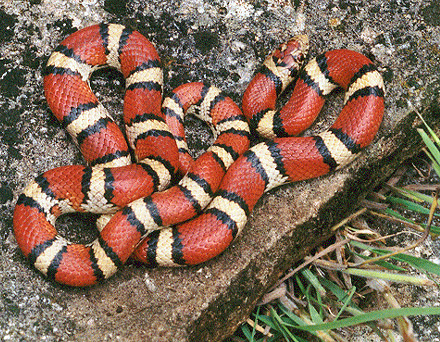
Lampropeltis triangulum

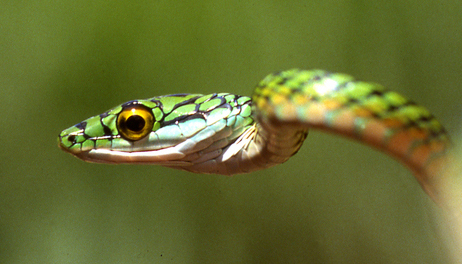
Leptophis ahaetulla

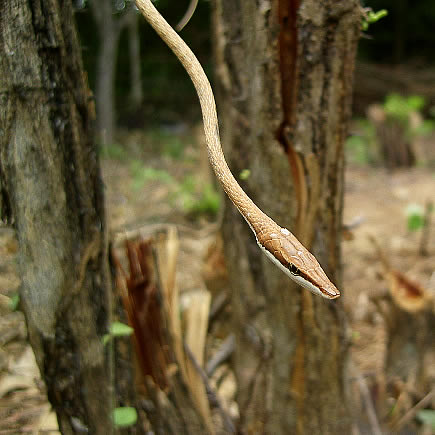
Oxybelis aeneus

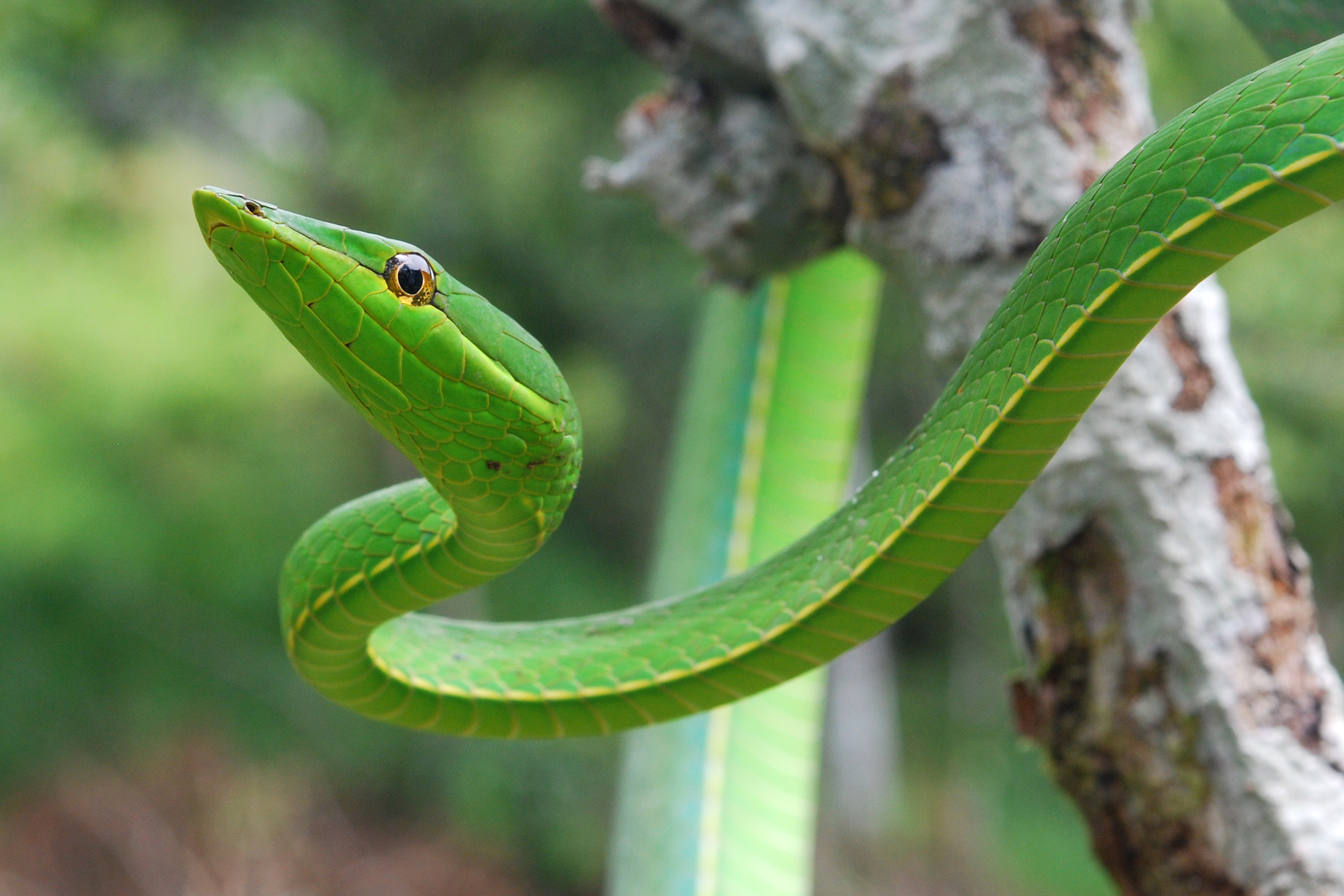
Oxybelis fulgidus

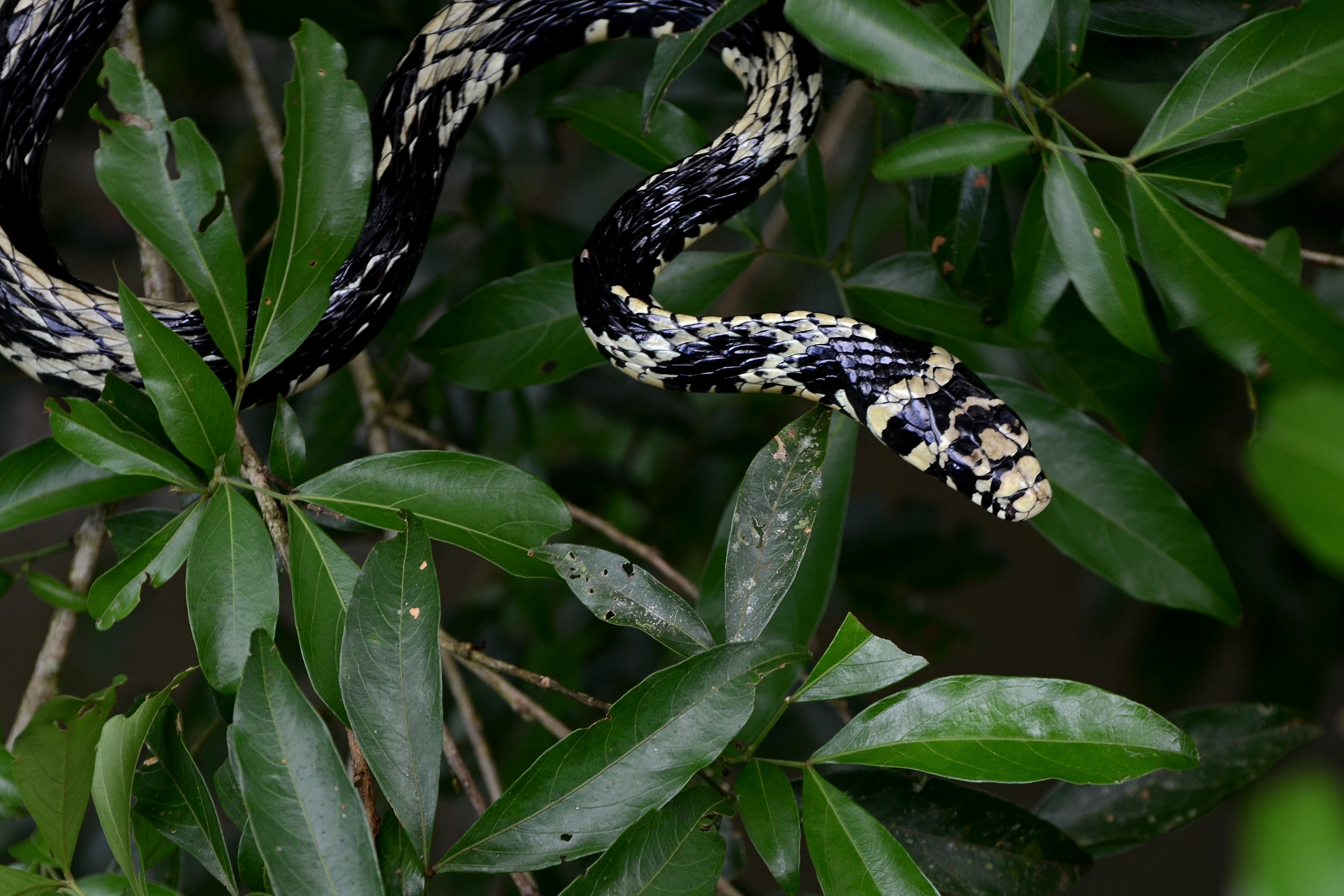
Spilotes pullatus

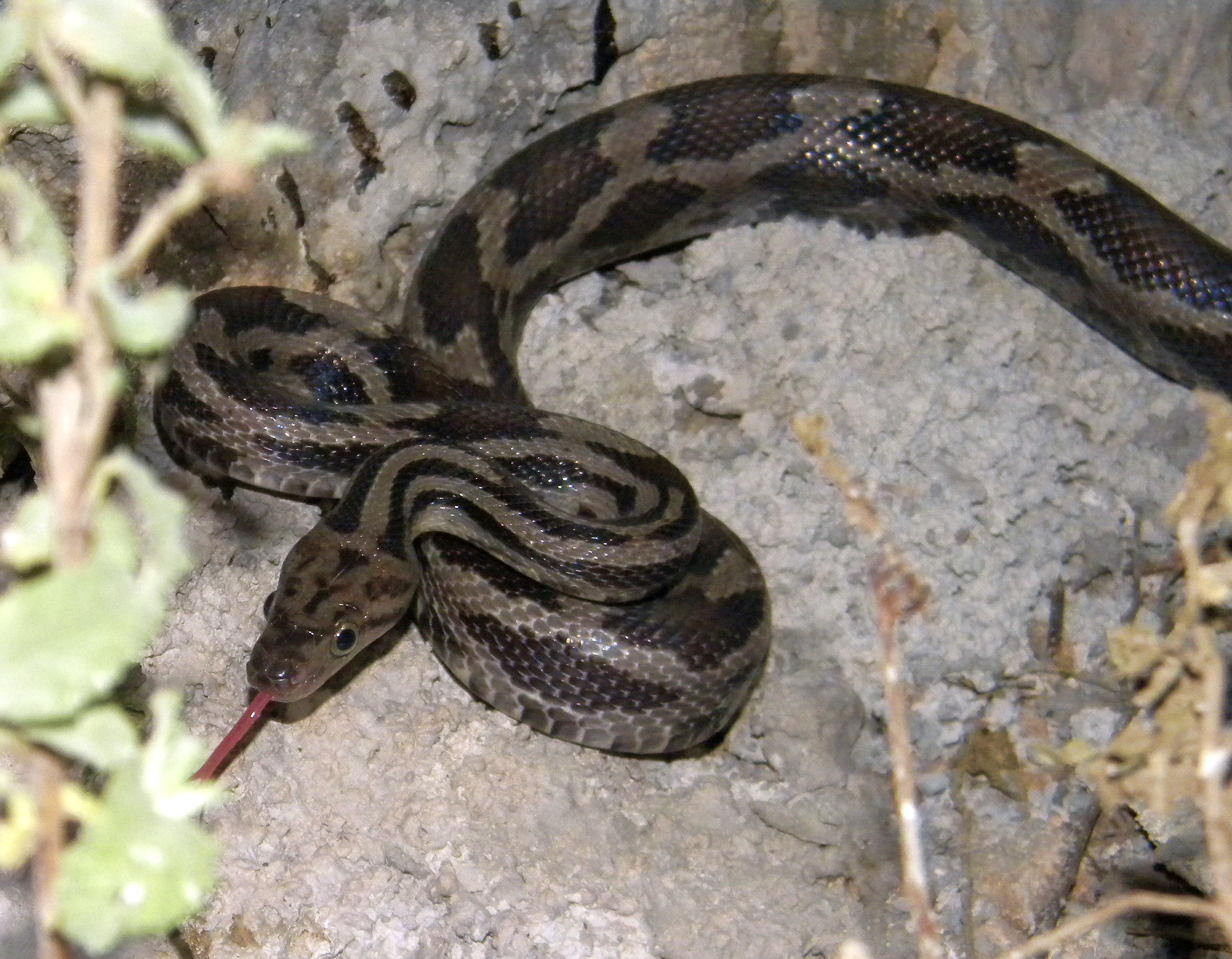
Elaphe flavirufa

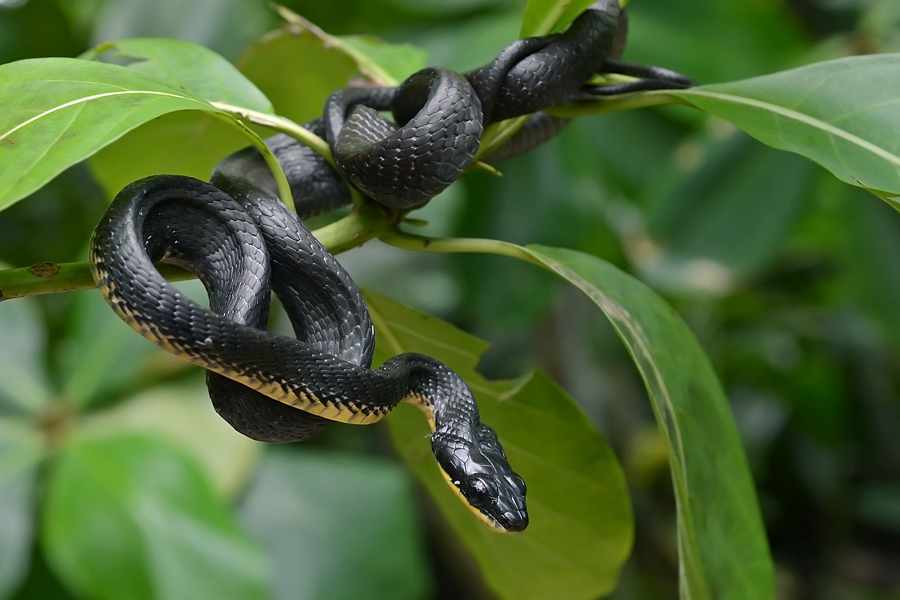
Pseustes poecilonotus

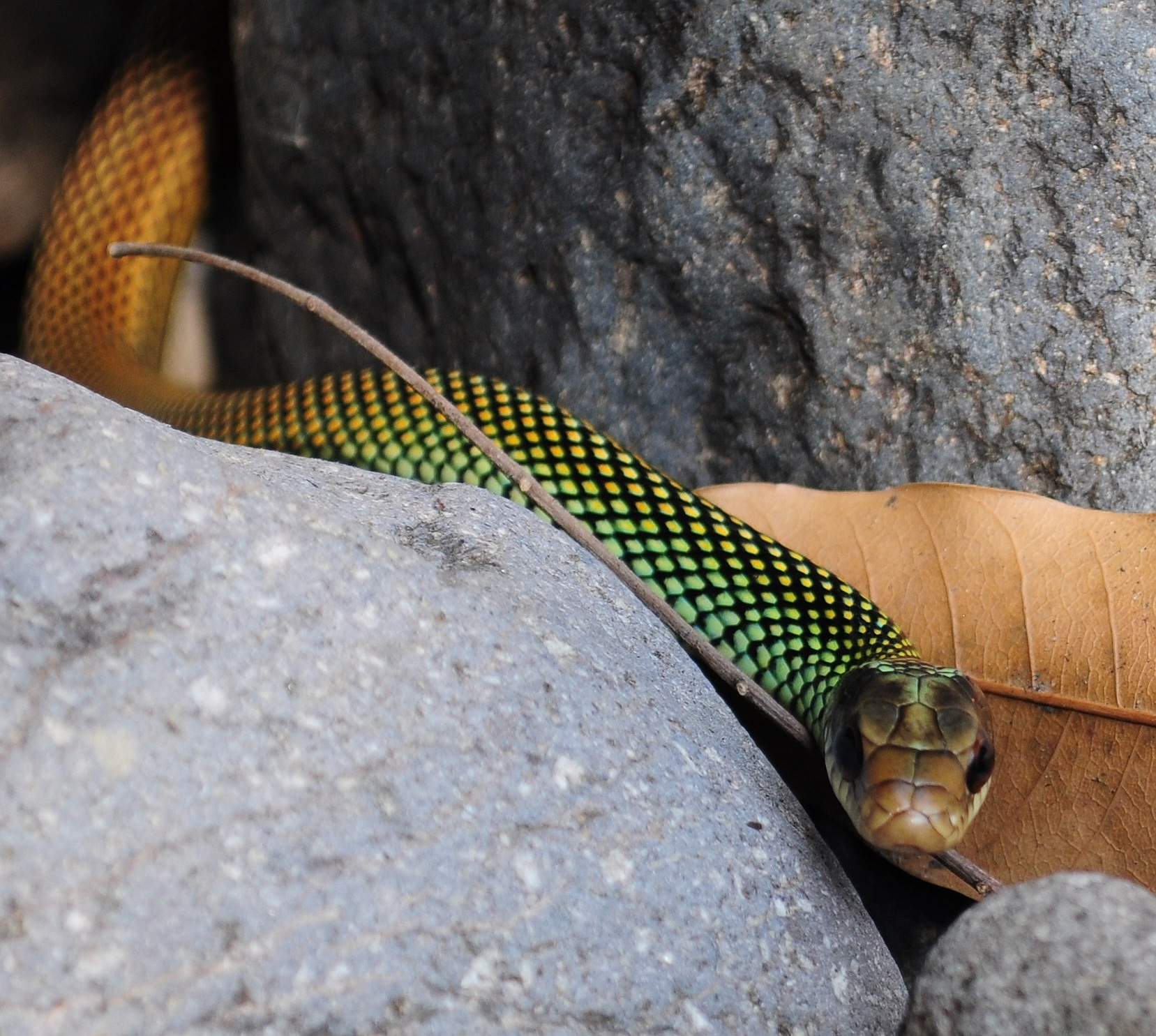
Drymobius margaritiferus

Order: Squamata · Family: Colubridae

The colubrids (Colubridæ) are a family of snakes with a global distribution, except Antarctica. They are characterized by having their heads covered with large scales of a typical arrangement. The dorsal and lateral scales of the body are approximately rhomboidal in outline; On the ventral side they have a single row of widened scales. They are generally diurnal, with well-developed eyes and mainly circular pupils. The majority is terrestrial, but there are also burrowing, amphibian, aquatic, arboreal and even gliding species. Although most colubrids are nonvenomous (or possess venom that has no notable effect on humans), some species, such as those in the genus Boiga, can produce bites with significant medical effects. Colubrids form the largest family of snakes. 134 species of colubrids occur in Mexico.

- Arizona elegans Kennicott 1859
- Bogertophis rosaliae (Mocquard, 1899)
- Bogertophis subocularis (Brown, 1901)
- Chilomeniscus savagei Cliff, 1954
- Chilomeniscus stramineus Cope, 1860
- Chionactis occipitalis (Hallowell, 1854)
- Chionactis palarostris (Klauber, 1937)
- Coluber anthonyi (Stejneger, 1901)
- Coluber aurigulus (Cope, 1861)
- Coluber bilineatus (Jan, 1863)
- Coluber constrictor Linnaeus, 1758
- Coluber flagellum Shaw, 1802
- Coluber fuliginosus (Cope, 1895)
- Coluber lateralis (Hallowell, 1853)
- Coluber mentovarius (Duméril, Bibron & Duméril, 1854)
- Coluber schotti (Baird & Girard, 1853)
- Coluber taeniatus (Hallowell, 1852)
- Conopsis acuta (Cope, 1886)
- Conopsis amphisticha (Smith & Laufe, 1945)
- Conopsis biserialis (Taylor & Smith, 1942)
- Conopsis lineata (Kennicott, 1859)
- Conopsis megalodon (Taylor & Smith, 1942)
- Conopsis nasus (Günther, 1858)
- Dendrophidion vinitor Smith, 1941
- Drymarchon corais (Boie, 1827)
- Drymarchon melanurus (Duméril, Bibron & Duméril, 1854)
- Drymobius chloroticus (Cope, 1886)
- Drymobius margaritiferus (Schlegel, 1837)
- Ficimia hardyi MENDOZA-QUIJANO & Smith, 1993
- Ficimia olivacea Gray, 1849
- Ficimia publia Cope, 1866
- Ficimia ramirezi Smith & Langebartel, 1949
- Ficimia ruspator Smith & Taylor, 1941
- Ficimia streckeri Taylor, 1931
- Ficimia variegata (Günther, 1858)
- Geagras redimitus Cope, 1876
- Gyalopion canum (Cope, 1861)
- Gyalopion quadrangulare (Günther, 1893)
- Lampropeltis alterna (Brown, 1901)
- Lampropeltis californiae (Blainville, 1835)
- Lampropeltis knoblochi (Taylor, 1940)
- Lampropeltis mexicana (Garman, 1884)
- Lampropeltis pyromelana (Cope, 1866)
- Lampropeltis ruthveni Blanchard, 1920
- Lampropeltis splendida (Baird & Girard, 1853)
- Lampropeltis triangulum (Lacépède, 1789)
- Lampropeltis webbi Bryson, Dixon & Lazcano, 2005
- Lampropeltis zonata (Lockington, 1835)
- Leptophis ahaetulla (Linnaeus, 1758)
- Leptophis diplotropis (Günther, 1872)
- Leptophis mexicanus Duméril, Bibron & Duméril, 1854
- Leptophis modestus (Günther, 1872) VU
- Mastigodryas cliftoni (Hardy, 1964)
- Mastigodryas dorsalis (Bocourt, 1890)
- Mastigodryas melanolomus (Cope, 1868)
- Opheodrys aestivus (Linnaeus, 1766)
- Opheodrys vernalis (Harlan, 1827)
- Oxybelis aeneus (Wagler, 1824)
- Oxybelis fulgidus (Daudin, 1803)
- Pantherophis bairdi (Yarrow, 1880)
- Pantherophis emoryi (Baird & Girard, 1853)
- Phyllorhynchus browni Stejneger, 1890
- Phyllorhynchus decurtatus (Cope, 1868)
- Pituophis catenifer Blainville, 1835
- Pituophis deppei (Duméril, 1853)
- Pituophis lineaticollis (Cope, 1861)
- Pituophis melanoleucus (Daudin, 1803)
- Pituophis vertebralis (Blainville, 1835)
- Pliocercus elapoides Cope, 1860
- Pliocercus wilmarai Smith, Perez-Higareda & Schiszar, 1996
- Pseudelaphe flavirufa (Cope, 1867)
- Pseudoficimia frontalis (Cope, 1864)
- Pseustes poecilonotus (Günther, 1858)
- Rhinocheilus lecontei Baird & Girard, 1853
- Salvadora bairdi Jan 1860
- Salvadora grahamiae Baird & Girard, 1853
- Salvadora hexalepis (Cope, 1867)
- Salvadora intermedia Hartweg, 1940
- Salvadora lemniscata (Cope, 1895)
- Salvadora mexicana (Duméril, Bibron & Duméril, 1854)
- Scaphiodontophis annulatus (Duméril, Bibron & Duméril, 1854)
- Senticolis triaspis (Cope, 1866)
- Sonora aemula (Cope, 1879)
- Sonora michoacanensis (Dugès, 1884)
- Sonora mutabilis Stickel, 1943
- Sonora semiannulata Baird & Girard, 1853
- Spilotes pullatus (Linnaeus, 1758)
- Stenorrhina degenhardtii (Berthold, 1846)
- Stenorrhina freminvillei (Duméril, Bibron & Duméril, 1854)
- Symphimus leucostomus Cope, 1869
- Symphimus mayae (Gaige, 1936)
- Sympholis lippiens Cope, 1861
- Tantilla atriceps (Günther, 1895)
- Tantilla bocourti (Günther, 1895)
- Tantilla briggsi Savitzky & Smith, 1971
- Tantilla calamarina Cope, 1866
- Tantilla cascadae Wilson & Meyer, 1981
- Tantilla ceboruca Canseco-Márquez, Smith, Ponce-Campos, Flores-Villela & Campbell, 2007
- Tantilla coronadoi Hartweg, 1944
- Tantilla cuniculator Smith, 1939
- Tantilla deppei (Bocourt, 1883)
- Tantilla flavilineata Smith & Burger, 1950
- Tantilla gracilis Baird & Girard, 1853
- Tantilla hobartsmithi Taylor, 1936
- Tantilla impensa Campbell, 1998
- Tantilla jani (Günther, 1895)
- Tantilla johnsoni Wilson, Vaughn & Dixon, 1999
- Tantilla melanocephala (Linnaeus, 1758)
- Tantilla moesta (Günther, 1863)
- Tantilla nigriceps Kennicott 1860
- Tantilla oaxacae Wilson & Meyer, 1971
- Tantilla planiceps (Blainville, 1835)
- Tantilla robusta Canseco-Márquez, MENDELSOHN & GUTIÉRREZ-MAYÉN, 2002
- Tantilla rubra Cope, 1876
- Tantilla schistosa (Bocourt, 1883)
- Tantilla sertula Wilson & Campbell, 2000
- Tantilla shawi Taylor, 1949
- Tantilla slavensi Pérez-Higareda, Smith & Smith, 1985
- Tantilla striata Dunn, 1928
- Tantilla taeniata Bocourt, 1883
- Tantilla tayrae Wilson, 1983
- Tantilla triseriata Smith & Smith, 1951
- Tantilla vulcani Campbell, 1998
- Tantilla wilcoxi Stejneger, 1902
- Tantilla yaquia Smith, 1942
- Tantillita brevissima (Taylor, 1937)
- Tantillita canula (Cope, 1876)
- Tantillita lintoni (Smith, 1940)
- Trimorphodon biscutatus (Duméril, Bibron & Duméril, 1854)
- Trimorphodon lambda Cope, 1886
- Trimorphodon lyrophanes (Cope, 1860)
- Trimorphodon paucimaculatus Taylor, 1938
- Trimorphodon tau Cope, 1870
- Trimorphodon vilkinsonii Cope, 1886

=== Dipsadidae ===
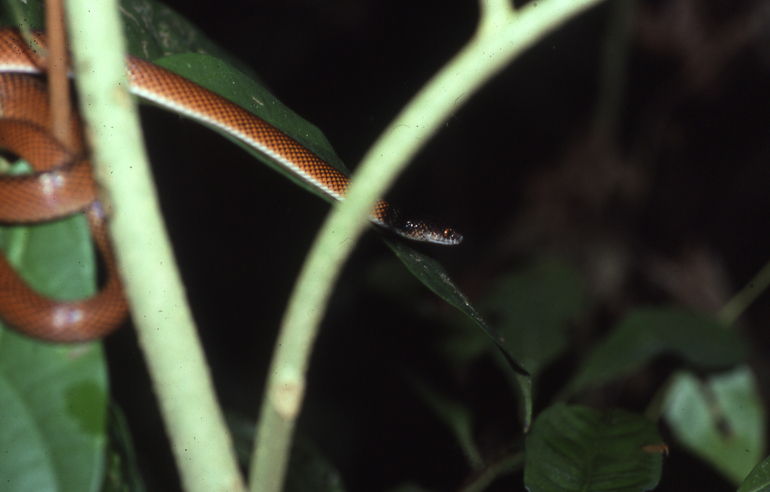
Clelia clelia

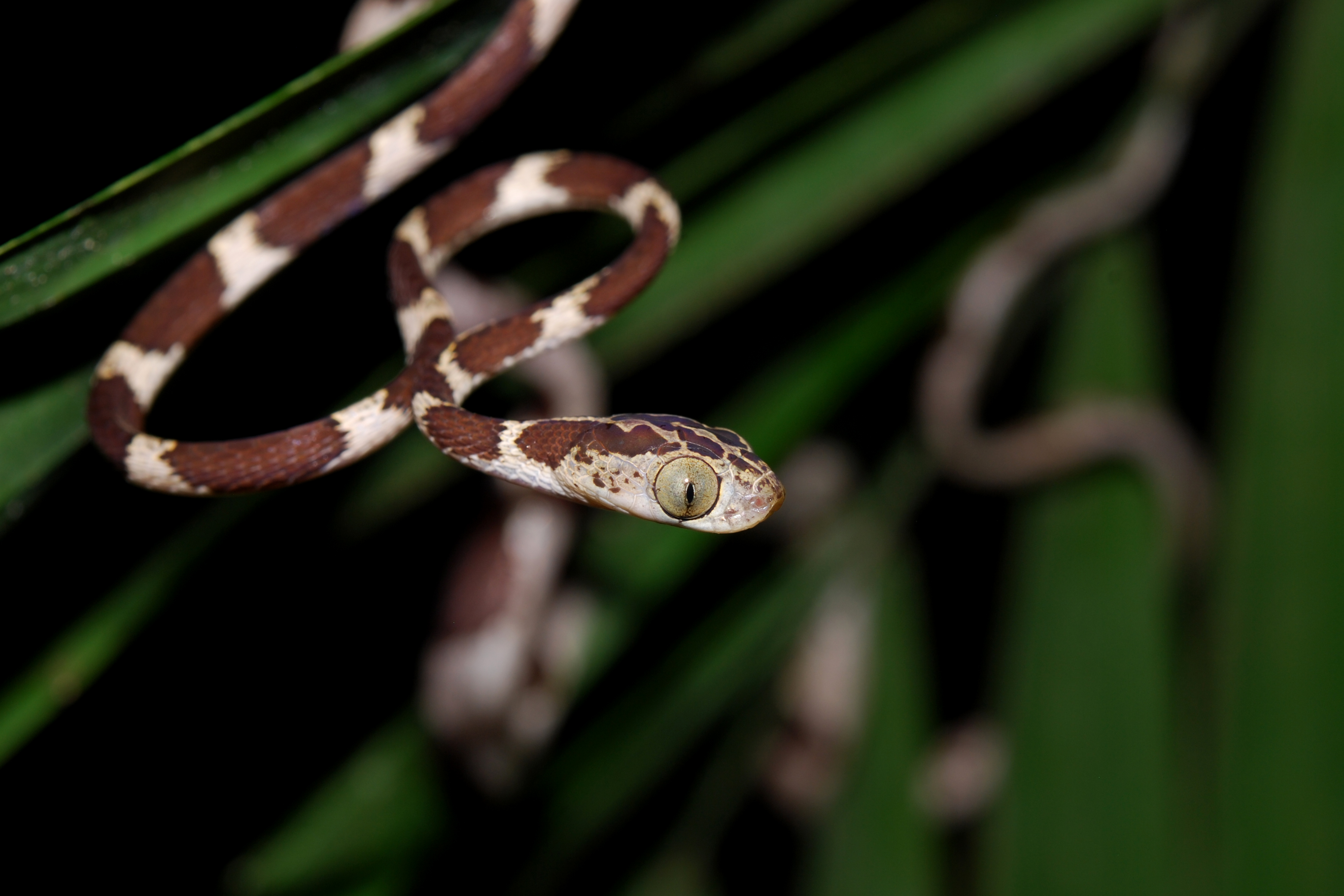
Imantodes cenchoa

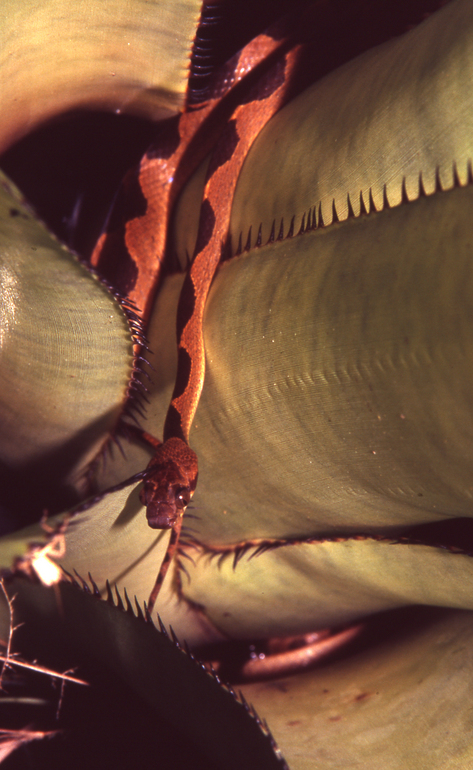
Leptodeira annulata

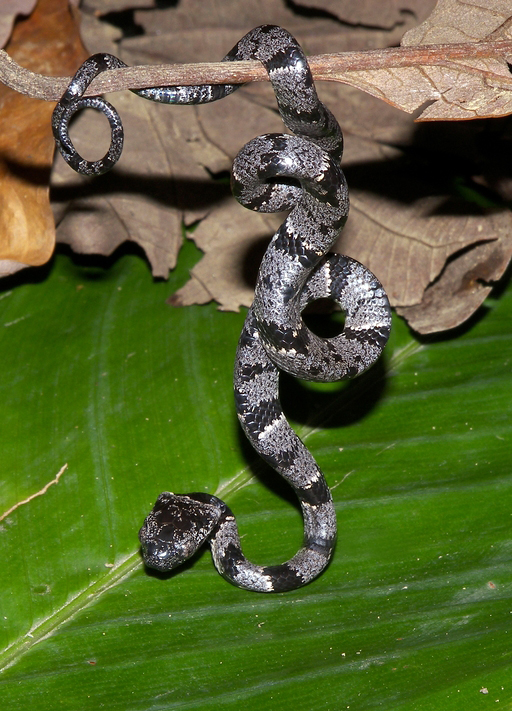
Sibon nebulata

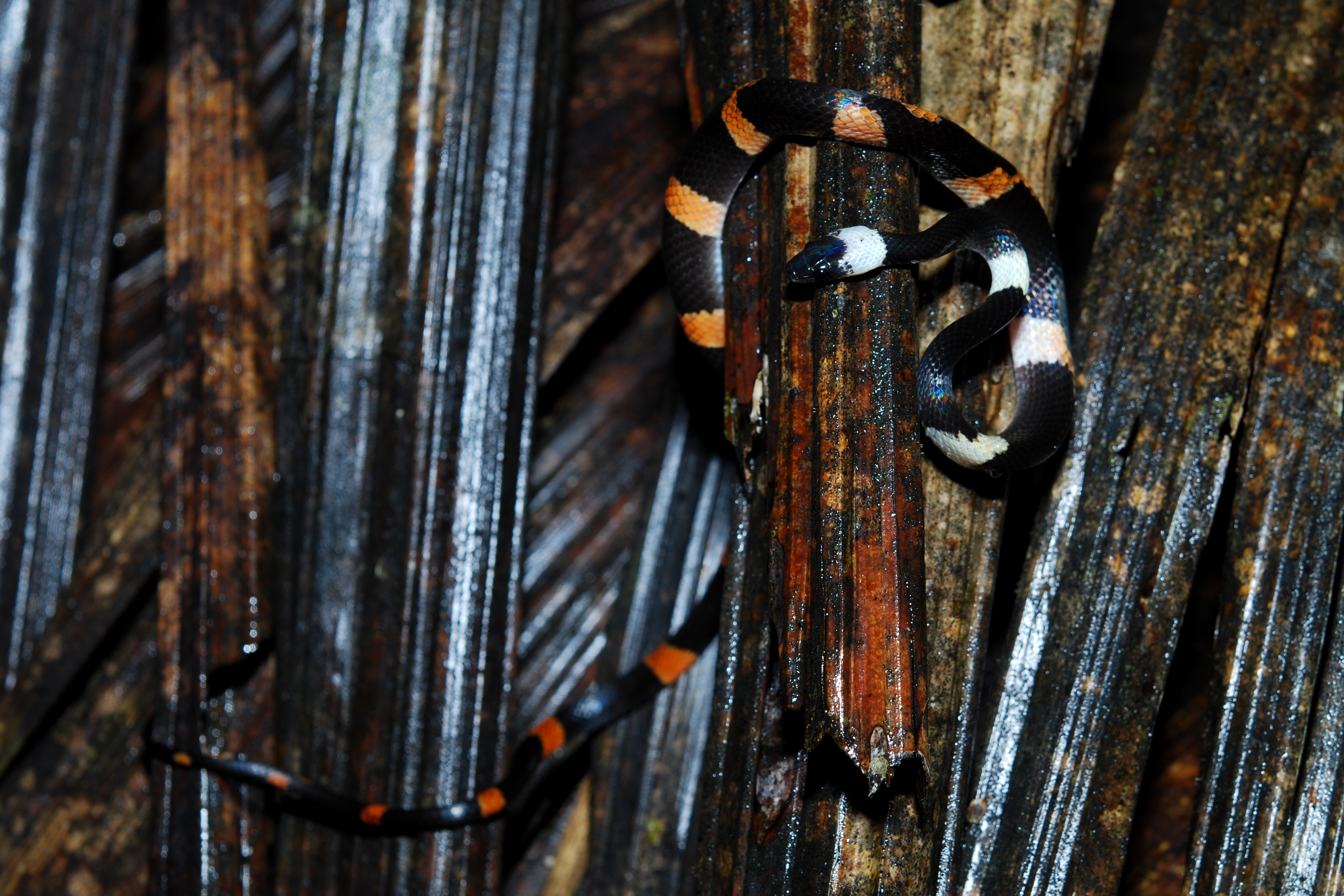
Oxyrhopus petola

Order: Squamata · Family: Dipsadidae

The dipsadids (Dipsadidae) are a family of snakes with a global distribution, consisting of 95 genera and 738 species. Some authors classify it as a subfamily (Dipsadinae) in the Colubridae family. 130 species occur in Mexico.

- Adelphicos latifasciatum Lynch & Smith, 1966
- Adelphicos nigrilatum Smith, 1942
- Adelphicos quadrivirgatum Jan 1862
- Adelphicos veraepacis Stuart, 1941
- Amastridium veliferum Cope, 1860
- Chersodromus liebmanni Reinhardt, 1861
- Chersodromus rubriventris (Taylor, 1949)
- Clelia clelia (Daudin, 1803)
- Clelia scytalina (Cope, 1867)
- Coniophanes alvarezi Campbell, 1989
- Coniophanes bipunctatus (Günther, 1858)
- Coniophanes fissidens (Günther, 1858)
- Coniophanes imperialis (Baird, 1859)
- Coniophanes lateritius Cope, 1862
- Coniophanes melanocephalus (Peters, 1869)
- Coniophanes meridanus Schmidt & Andrews, 1936
- Coniophanes michoacanensis Flores-Villela & Smith, 2009
- Coniophanes piceivittis Cope, 1869
- Coniophanes quinquevittatus (Duméril, Bibron & Duméril, 1854)
- Coniophanes sarae Ponce-Campos & Smith, 2001
- Coniophanes schmidti Bailey, 1937
- Coniophanes taylori Hall, 1951
- Conophis lineatus (Duméril, Bibron & Duméril, 1854)
- Conophis morai Perez-Higareda, Lopez-Luna & Smith, 2002
- Conophis pulcher Cope, 1869
- Conophis vittatus Peters, 1860
- Cryophis hallbergi Bogert & Duellman, 1963
- Diadophis punctatus (Linnaeus, 1766)
- Dipsas brevifacies (Cope, 1866)
- Dipsas gaigeae (Oliver, 1937)
- Dipsas maxillaris (Werner, 1910)
- Enulius flavitorques (Cope, 1868)
- Enulius oligostichus Smith, Arndt & Sherbrook, 1967
- Geophis anocularis Dunn, 1920
- Geophis bicolor Günther, 1868
- Geophis blanchardi Taylor & Smith, 1939
- Geophis cancellatus Smith, 1941
- Geophis carinosus Stuart, 1941
- Geophis chalybeus (Wagler, 1830)
- Geophis dubius (Peters, 1861)
- Geophis duellmani Smith & Holland, 1969
- Geophis dugesii Bocourt, 1883
- Geophis immaculatus Downs, 1967
- Geophis incomptus Duellman, 1959
- Geophis isthmicus (Boulenger, 1894)
- Geophis juarezi Nieto-Montes de Oca, 2003
- Geophis juliai Pérez-Higareda, Smith & López-Luna, 2001
- Geophis laticinctus Smith & Williams, 1963
- Geophis laticollaris Smith, Lynch & Altig, 1965
- Geophis latifrontalis Garman, 1883
- Geophis maculiferus Taylor, 1941
- Geophis mutitorques (Cope, 1885)
- Geophis nasalis (Cope, 1868)
- Geophis nigrocinctus Duellman, 1959
- Geophis occabus Pavón-Vázquez, García-Vázquez, Blancas-Hernández & Nieto-Montes de Oca, 2011
- Geophis omiltemanus Günther, 1893
- Geophis petersii Boulenger, 1894
- Geophis pyburni Campbell & Murphy, 1977
- Geophis rhodogaster (Cope, 1868)
- Geophis rostralis (Jan, 1865)
- Geophis russatus Smith & Williams, 1966
- Geophis sallaei Boulenger, 1894
- Geophis semidoliatus (Duméril, Bibron & Duméril, 1854)
- Geophis sieboldi (Jan, 1862)
- Geophis tarascae Hartweg, 1959
- Geophis turbidus Pavón-Vazquez, Canseco-Márquez & Nieto-Montes de Oca, 2013
- Heterodon kennerlyi Kennicott 1860
- Heterodon nasicus Baird & Girard, 1852
- Hypsiglena affinis Boulenger, 1894
- Hypsiglena chlorophaea Cope, 1860
- Hypsiglena jani (Dugès, 1865)
- Hypsiglena ochrorhynchus Cope, 1860
- Hypsiglena slevini Tanner, 1943
- Hypsiglena tanzeri Dixon & Lieb, 1972
- Hypsiglena torquata (Günther, 1860)
- Imantodes cenchoa (Linnaeus, 1758)
- Imantodes gemmistratus (Cope, 1861)
- Imantodes tenuissimus (Cope, 1867)
- Leptodeira annulata (Linnaeus, 1758)
- Leptodeira frenata (Cope, 1886)
- Leptodeira maculata (Hallowell, 1861)
- Leptodeira nigrofasciata Günther, 1868
- Leptodeira polysticta Günther, 1895
- Leptodeira punctata (Peters, 1866)
- Leptodeira septentrionalis Kennicott 1859
- Leptodeira splendida Günther, 1895
- Leptodeira uribei (Bautista & Smith, 1992)
- Manolepis putnami (Jan, 1863)
- Ninia diademata Baird & Girard, 1853
- Ninia sebae (Duméril, Bibron & Duméril, 1854)
- Oxyrhopus petolarius (Linnaeus, 1758)
- Pseudoleptodeira latifasciata (Günther, 1894)
- Rhadinaea bogertorum Myers, 1974
- Rhadinaea cuneata Myers, 1974
- Rhadinaea decorata (Günther, 1858)
- Rhadinaea forbesi Smith, 1942
- Rhadinaea fulvivittis Cope, 1875
- Rhadinaea gaigeae Bailey, 1937
- Rhadinaea hesperia Bailey, 1940
- Rhadinaea laureata (Günther, 1868)
- Rhadinaea macdougalli Smith & Langebartel, 1949
- Rhadinaea marcellae Taylor, 1949
- Rhadinaea montana Smith, 1944
- Rhadinaea myersi Rossman, 1965
- Rhadinaea omiltemana (Günther, 1894)
- Rhadinaea quinquelineata Cope, 1886
- Rhadinaea taeniata (Peters, 1863)
- Rhadinella godmani (Günther, 1865)
- Rhadinella hannsteini (Stuart, 1949)
- Rhadinella hempsteadae (Stuart & Bailey, 1941)
- Rhadinella kanalchutchan (Mendelson & Kizirian, 1995)
- Rhadinella kinkelini (Boettger, 1898)
- Rhadinella lachrymans (Cope, 1870)
- Rhadinella posadasi (Slevin, 1936)
- Rhadinella schistosa Smith, 1941
- Rhadinophanes monticola Myers & Campbell, 1981
- Sibon dimidiatus (Günther, 1872)
- Sibon linearis Perez-Higareda, Lopez-Luna & Smith, 2002
- Sibon nebulatus (Linnaeus, 1758)
- Sibon sanniolus (Cope, 1866)
- Tantalophis discolor (Günther, 1860)
- Tretanorhinus nigroluteus Cope, 1861
- Tropidodipsas annuliferus Boulenger, 1894
- Tropidodipsas fasciata Günther, 1858
- Tropidodipsas fischeri (Boulenger, 1894)
- Tropidodipsas philippii (Jan, 1863)
- Tropidodipsas repleta Smith, Lemos-Espinal, Hartman & Schiszar, 2005
- Tropidodipsas sartorii Cope, 1863
- Tropidodipsas zweifeli (Liner & Wilson, 1970)
- Xenodon rabdocephalus (Wied, 1824)

=== Natricidae ===
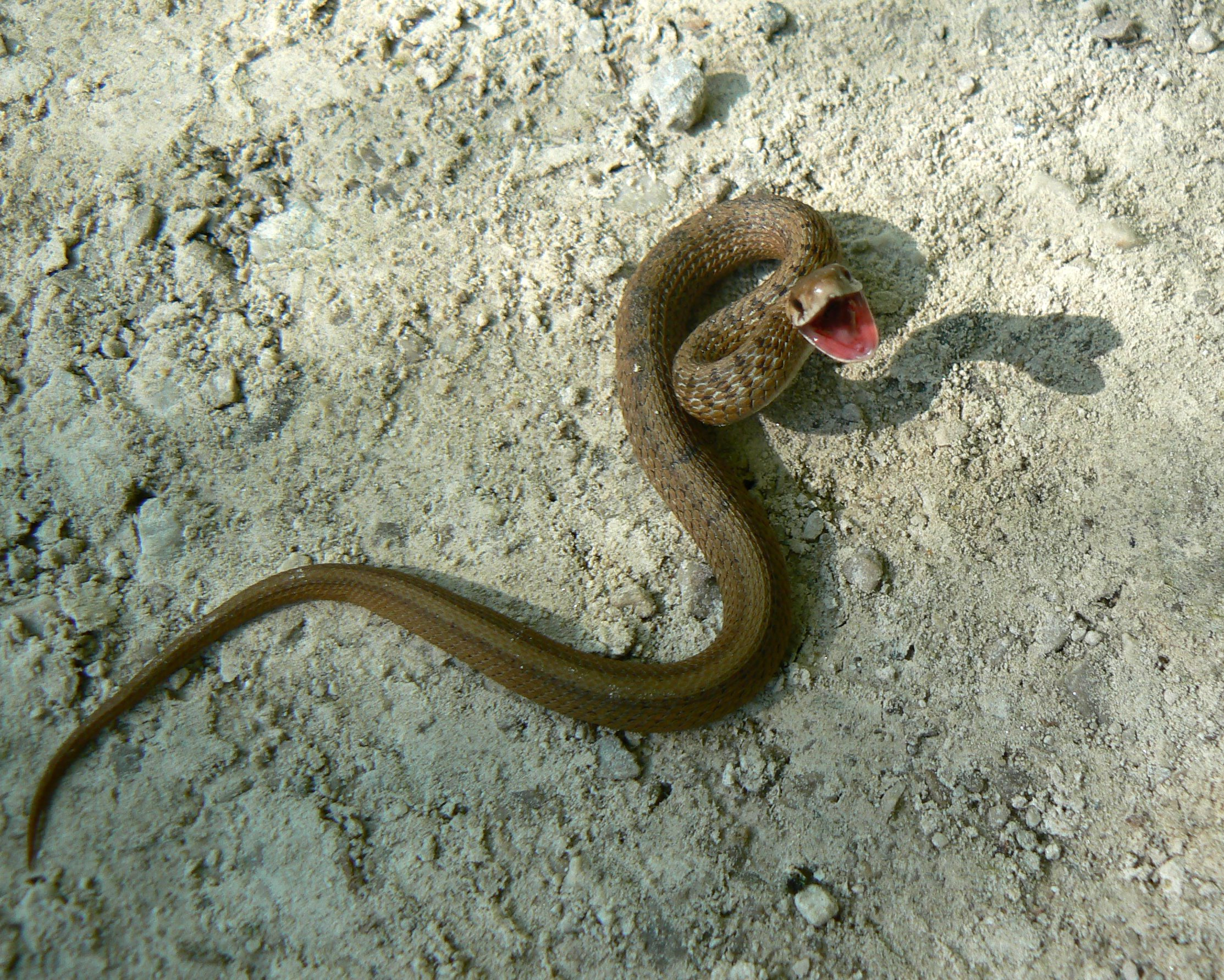
Storeria dekayi

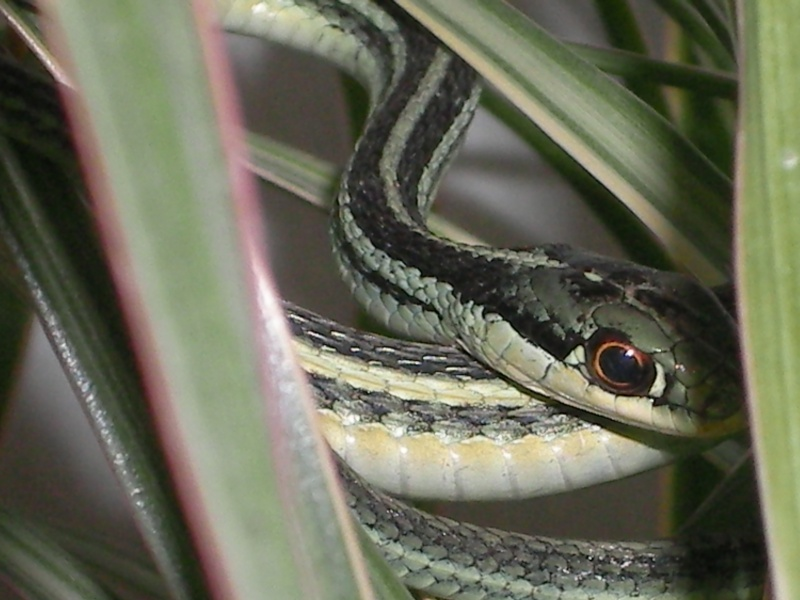
Thamnophis proximus

Order: Squamata · Family: Natricidae

The natricines (Natricidae) are a family of snakes with a global distribution, consisting of 222 species. Some authors classify it as a subfamily (Natracinae) in the Colubridae family. 36 species occur in Mexico.

- Adelophis copei Dugès, 1879
- Adelophis foxi Rossman & Blaney, 1968
- Nerodia erythrogaster (Forster, 1771)
- Nerodia rhombifer (Hallowell, 1852)
- Storeria dekayi (Holbrook, 1839)
- Storeria hidalgoensis Taylor, 1942
- Storeria storerioides (Cope, 1866)
- Thamnophis angustirostris (Kennicott, 1860)
- Thamnophis bogerti Rossman & Burbrink, 2005
- Thamnophis chrysocephalus (Cope, 1885)
- Thamnophis conanti Rossman & Burbrink, 2005
- Thamnophis cyrtopsis (Kennicott, 1860)
- Thamnophis elegans (Baird & Girard, 1853)
- Thamnophis eques (Reuss, 1834)
- Thamnophis exsul Rossman, 1969
- Thamnophis fulvus (Bocourt, 1893)
- Thamnophis godmani (Günther, 1894)
- Thamnophis hammondii (Kennicott, 1860)
- Thamnophis lineri Rossman & Burbrink, 2005
- Thamnophis marcianus (Baird & Girard, 1853)
- Thamnophis melanogaster (Wiegmann, 1830)
- Thamnophis mendax Walker, 1955
- Thamnophis nigronuchalis Thompson, 1957
- Thamnophis postremus Smith, 1942
- Thamnophis proximus (Say, 1823)
- Thamnophis pulchrilatus (Cope, 1885)
- Thamnophis radix (Baird & Girard, 1853)
- Thamnophis rossmani Conant, 2000
- Thamnophis rufipunctatus (Cope, 1875)
- Thamnophis sauritus (Linnaeus, 1766)
- Thamnophis scalaris Cope, 1861
- Thamnophis scaliger (Jan, 1863)
- Thamnophis sirtalis (Linnaeus, 1758)
- Thamnophis sumichrasti (Cope, 1866)
- Thamnophis valida (Kennicott, 1860)
- Tropidoclonion lineatum (Hallowell, 1856)

=== Elapidae ===
Order: Squamata · Family: Elapidae

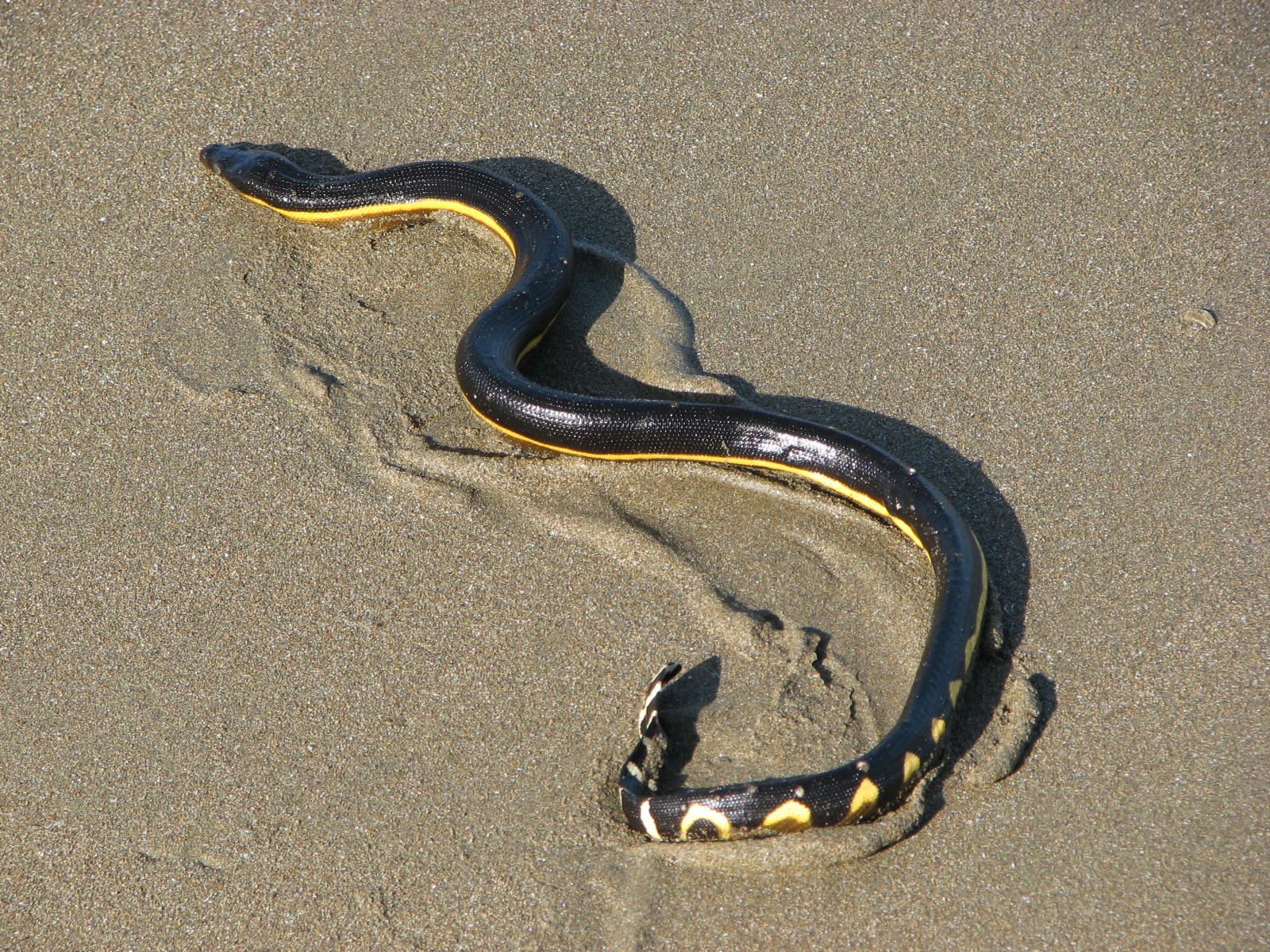
Hydrophis platurus

Elapids (Elapidae) are a family of highly venomous snakes that live in tropical and subtropical regions of the world. They are characterized by having fixed hollow fangs through which they inject venom. They have a size that can vary from 18 cm (7.1 in) (Drysdalia) to more than 5 m (16 ft) (Ophiophagus) in length. Some of its best-known members are cobras, coral snakes, mambas, and sea snakes. Outwardly, terrestrial elapids are similar to colubrids; Almost all of them have a long, thin body, a head covered with large scales and eyes with round pupils. Furthermore, their behavior is generally quite active, and many species are oviparous. Sea snakes, which are also elapids, have adapted to marine life in different ways and to varying degrees. Their characteristics may include laterally flattened bodies and rudder tails for swimming, as well as the ability to excrete salt. Currently, a total of 351 species are distinguished globally. 19 species occur in Mexico, of which 17 are coral snakes.

- Hydrophis platurus (Linnaeus, 1766)
- Laticauda colubrina (Schneider, 1799)
- Micruroides euryxanthus (Kennicott, 1860)
- Micrurus bernadi (Cope, 1887)
- Micrurus bogerti Roze, 1967
- Micrurus browni Schmidt & Smith, 1943
- Micrurus diastema (Duméril, Bibron & Duméril, 1854)
- Micrurus distans (Kennicott, 1860)
- Micrurus elegans (Jan, 1858)
- Micrurus ephippifer (Cope, 1886)
- Micrurus laticollaris (Peters, 1870)
- Micrurus latifasciatus Schmidt, 1933
- Micrurus limbatus Fraser, 1964
- Micrurus nebularis Roze, 1989
- Micrurus nigrocinctus (Girard, 1854)
- Micrurus pachecogili Campbell, 2000
- Micrurus proximans Smith & Chrapliwy, 1958
- Micrurus tamaulipensis Lavin-Murcio & Dixon, 2004
- Micrurus tener Baird & Girard, 1853

=== Viperidae ===
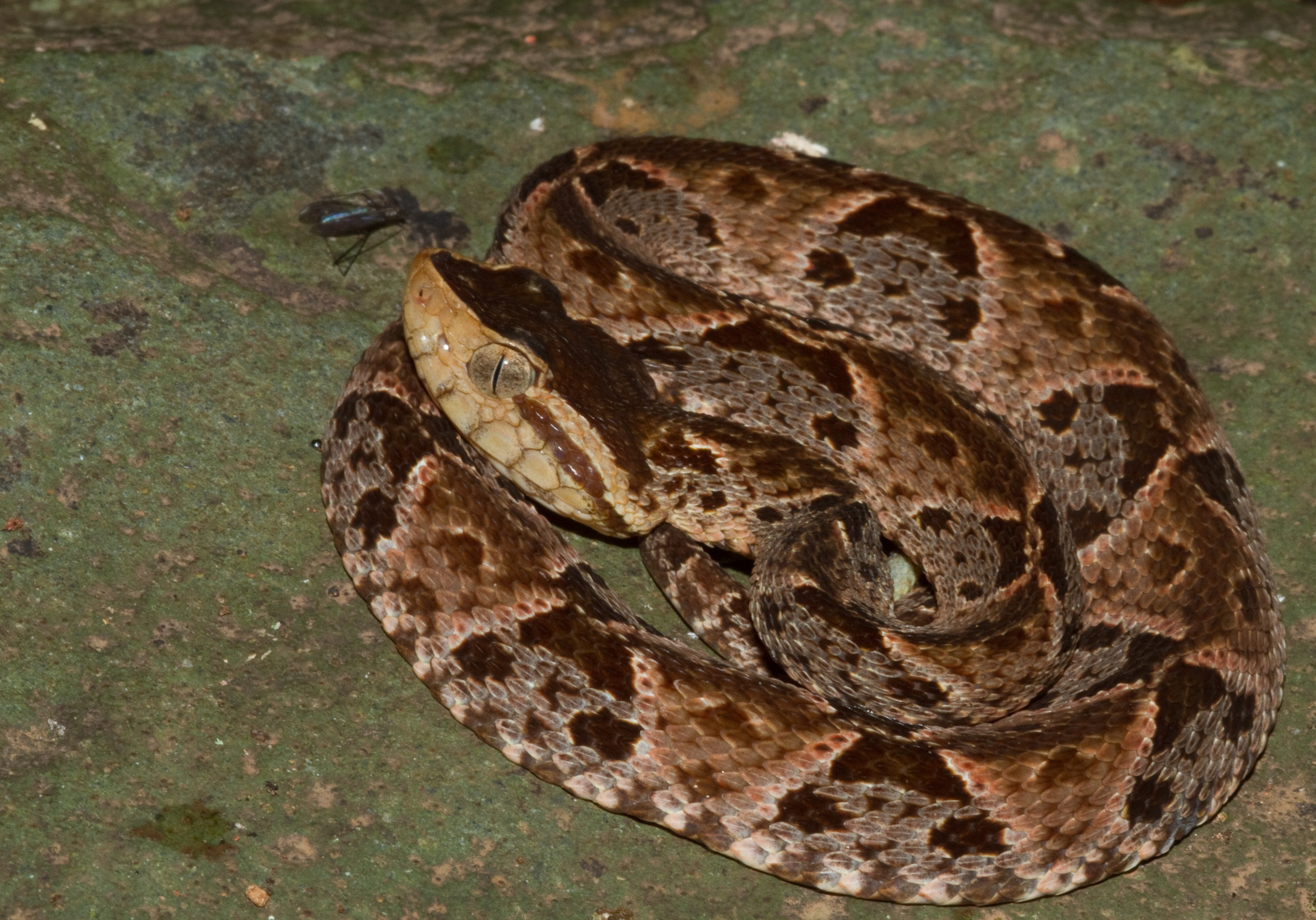
Bothrops asper

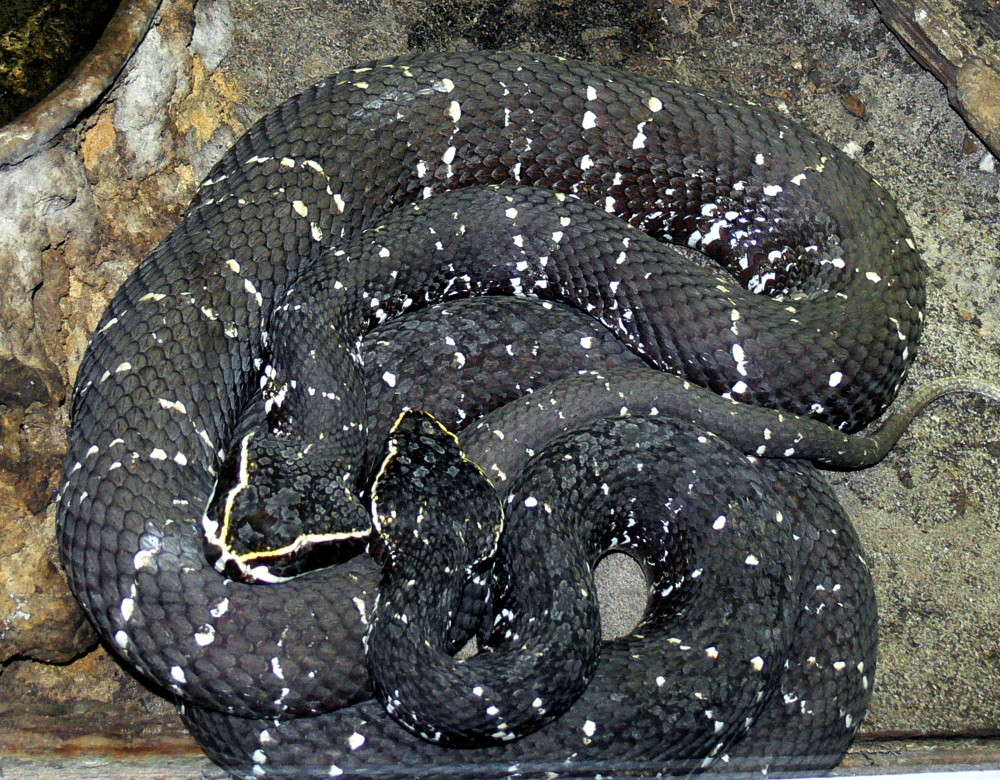
Agkistrodon bilineatus

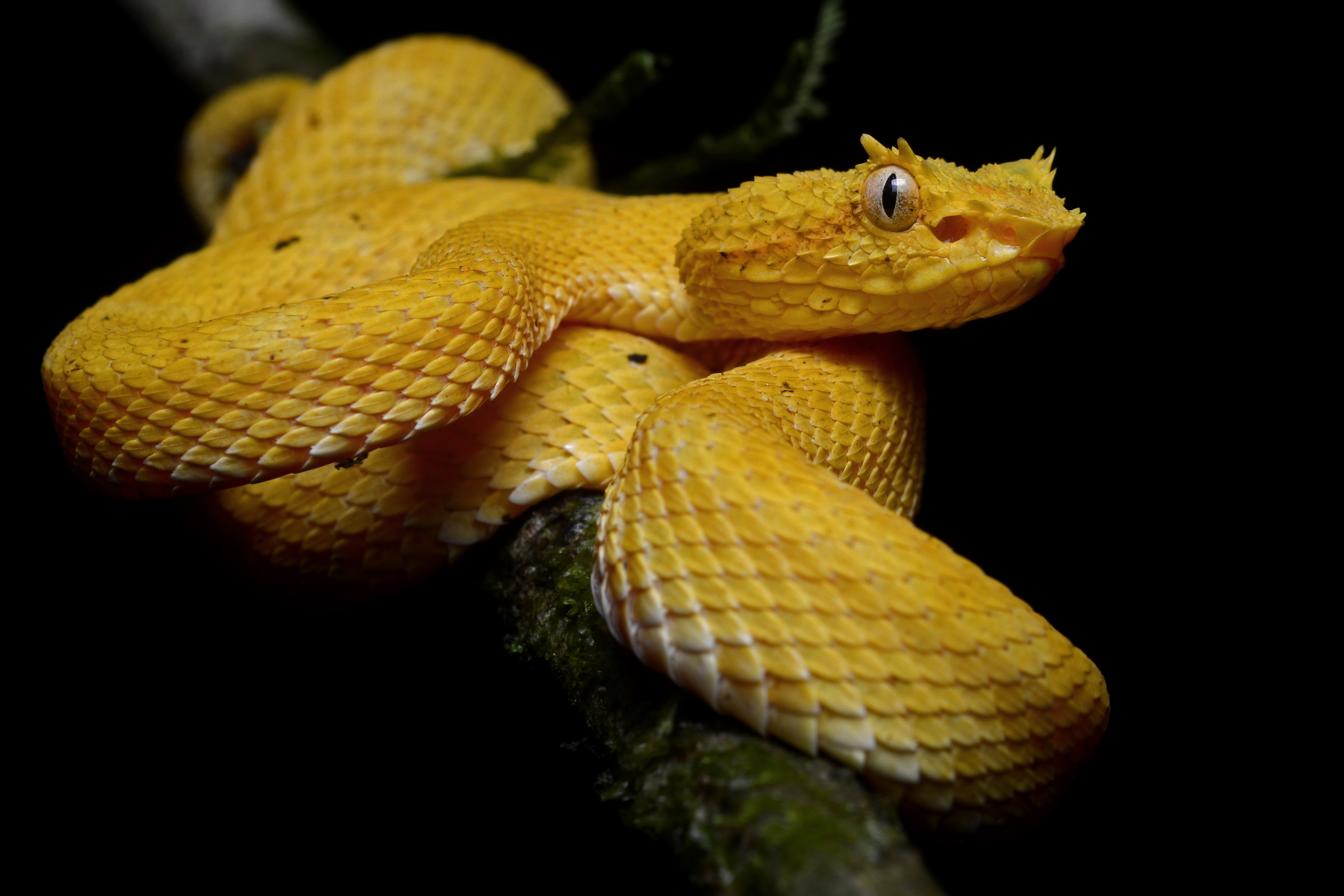
Bothriechis nigroadspersus

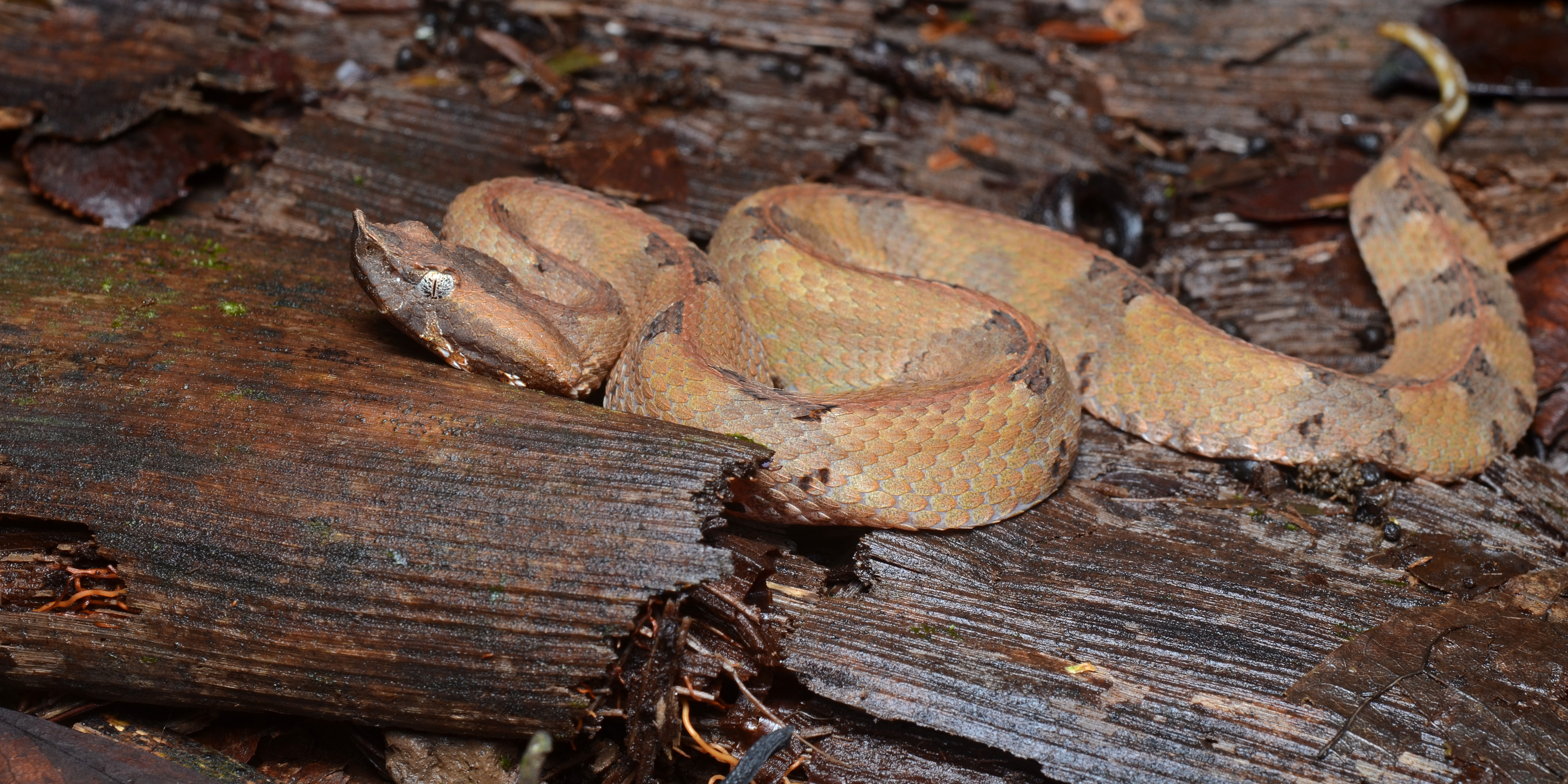
Porthidium nasutum

Order: Squamata · Family: Viperidae

The viperids (Viperidae) are a family of highly venomous snakes that comprises four subfamilies. The subfamily Crotalinae, commonly known as "pit vipers", are the only viperids native to America. They have a loreal pit, a hole on each side of the head between the eye and the nostril; It is a thermoreceptor organ that is very sensitive to temperature variations and is used to detect warm-blooded prey. Approximately 321 species of viperids are distinguished, grouped into 32 genera. In Mexico, 10 genera and 59 species occur.

- Agkistrodon bilineatus Günther, 1863 NT
- Agkistrodon contortrix (Linnaeus, 1766)
- Agkistrodon russeolus Gloyd, 1972
- Agkistrodon taylori Burger & Robertson, 1951
- Atropoides mexicanus (Duméril, Bibron & Duméril, 1854)
- Atropoides nummifer (Rüppel, 1845)
- Atropoides occiduus (Hoge, 1966)
- Atropoides olmec (Perez-Higareda, Smith, Julia-Zertuche, 1985)
- Bothriechis aurifer (Salvin, 1860) VU
- Bothriechis bicolor (Bocourt, 1868)
- Bothriechis rowleyi (Bogert, 1968)
- Bothriechis schlegelii (Berthold, 1846)
- Bothrops asper (Garman, 1883)
- Cerrophidion godmani (Günther, 1863)
- Cerrophidion petlalcalensis Lopéz-Luna, Vogt & Torre-Loranca, 1999
- Cerrophidion tzotzilorum (Campbell, 1985)
- Crotalus aquilus Klauber, 1952
- Crotalus atrox Baird & Girard, 1853
- Crotalus basiliscus (Cope, 1864)
- Crotalus catalinensis Cliff, 1954 CR
- Crotalus cerastes Hallowell, 1854
- Crotalus cerberus (Coues, 1875)
- Crotalus culminatus Klauber, 1952
- Crotalus durissus Linnaeus, 1758
- Crotalus enyo (Cope, 1861)
- Crotalus ericsmithi Campbell & Flores-Villela, 2008
- Crotalus intermedius Troschel, 1865
- Crotalus lannomi Tanner, 1966
- Crotalus lepidus (Kennicott, 1861)
- Crotalus mitchellii (Cope, 1861)
- Crotalus molossus Baird & Girard, 1853
- Crotalus oreganus Holbrook, 1840
- Crotalus ornatus Hallowell, 1854
- Crotalus polystictus (Cope, 1865)
- Crotalus pricei Van Denburgh, 1895
- Crotalus pusillus Klauber, 1952
- Crotalus ravus Cope, 1865
- Crotalus ruber Cope, 1892
- Crotalus scutulatus (Kennicott, 1861)
- Crotalus simus Latreille, 1801
- Crotalus stejnegeri Dunn, 1919
- Crotalus tancitarensis Alvarado-Díaz & Campbell, 2004
- Crotalus tigris Kennicott 1859
- Crotalus totonacus Gloyd & Kauffeld, 1940
- Crotalus transversus Taylor, 1944
- Crotalus triseriatus (Wagler, 1830)
- Crotalus tzabcan Klauber, 1952
- Crotalus viridis (Rafinesque, 1818)
- Crotalus willardi Meek, 1905
- Mixcoatlus barbouri (Dunn, 1919)
- Mixcoatlus browni (Shreve, 1938)
- Mixcoatlus melanurus (Müller, 1923)
- Ophryacus undulatus (Jan, 1859)
- Porthidium dunni (Hartweg & Oliver, 1938)
- Porthidium hespere (Campbell, 1976)
- Porthidium nasutum (Bocourt, 1868)
- Porthidium ophryomegas (Bocourt, 1868)
- Porthidium yucatanicum (Smith, 1941)
- Sistrurus catenatus (Rafinesque, 1818)

== See also ==
- List of mammals of Mexico
- List of birds of Mexico
- List of amphibians of Mexico
