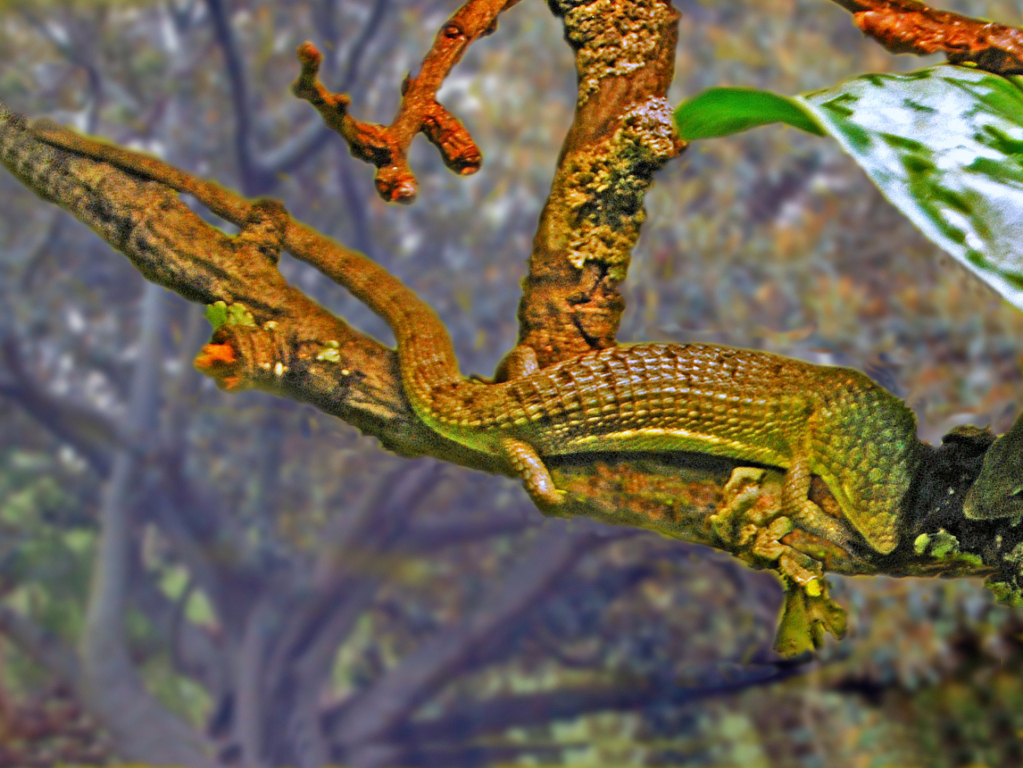

Conservation status
- Least Concern (IUCN 3.1)
- CITES Appendix II

Scientific classification
- Kingdom: Animalia
- Phylum: Chordata
- Class: Reptilia
- Order: Squamata
- Suborder: Anguimorpha
- Family: Anguidae
- Genus: Abronia
- Species: A. lythrochila

Binomial name
- Abronia lythrochila H.M. Smith & Álvarez del Toro, 1963
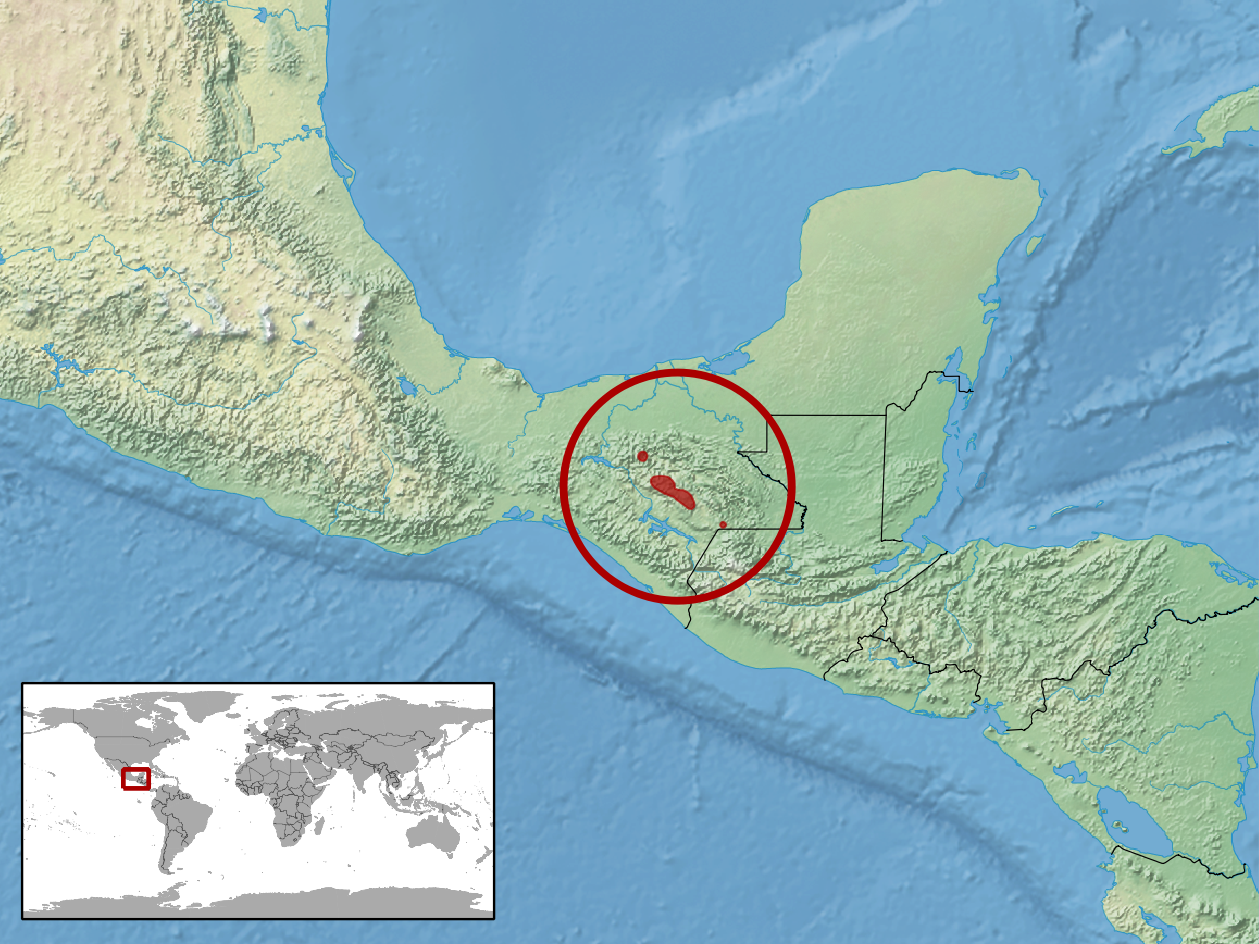

Synonyms
- Gerrhonotus lythrochilus (H.M. Smith & Álvarez del Toro, 1963); Abronia (Auriculabronia) lythrochila H.M. Smith & Álvarez del Toro, 1963

= Abronia lythrochila =

Species of lizard

Abronia lythrochila, also known commonly as the red-lipped arboreal alligator lizard and escorpión arboricola de labios rojos in Mexican Spanish, is a species of lizard in the family Anguidae. The species is native to southern Mexico.

== Geographic distribution ==
Abronia lythrochila is endemic to the state of Chiapas in Mexico.

== Habitat ==
Abronia lythrochila lives in montane dry pine-oak forest, at an elevation of 2,000–3,000 m (6,600–9,800 ft).

== Conservation status ==
Abronia lythrochila has a relatively small geographic range but is common within it. The species is threatened by deforestation, but much of its range is in protected areas, including Lagunas de Montebello National Park.

== Description ==
Abronia lythrochila can reach a total length (tail included) of about 7–11 in (18–28 cm). The basic body color is greenish-olive, with irregular dark blotches. There are spiny horn-like scales on each side of the head. The lower labials are blood-red, to which the common names refer. The tail is prehensile.

== Diet ==
Abronia lythrochila preys predominately upon insects.

== Reproduction ==
Abronia lythrochila is ovoviviparous.
