= Abronia viridiflava =

Conservation status
- Least Concern (IUCN 3.1)

Scientific classification
- Kingdom: Animalia
- Phylum: Chordata
- Class: Reptilia
- Order: Squamata
- Suborder: Anguimorpha
- Family: Anguidae
- Genus: Abronia
- Species: A. viridiflava

Binomial name
- Abronia viridiflava (Bocourt, 1873)
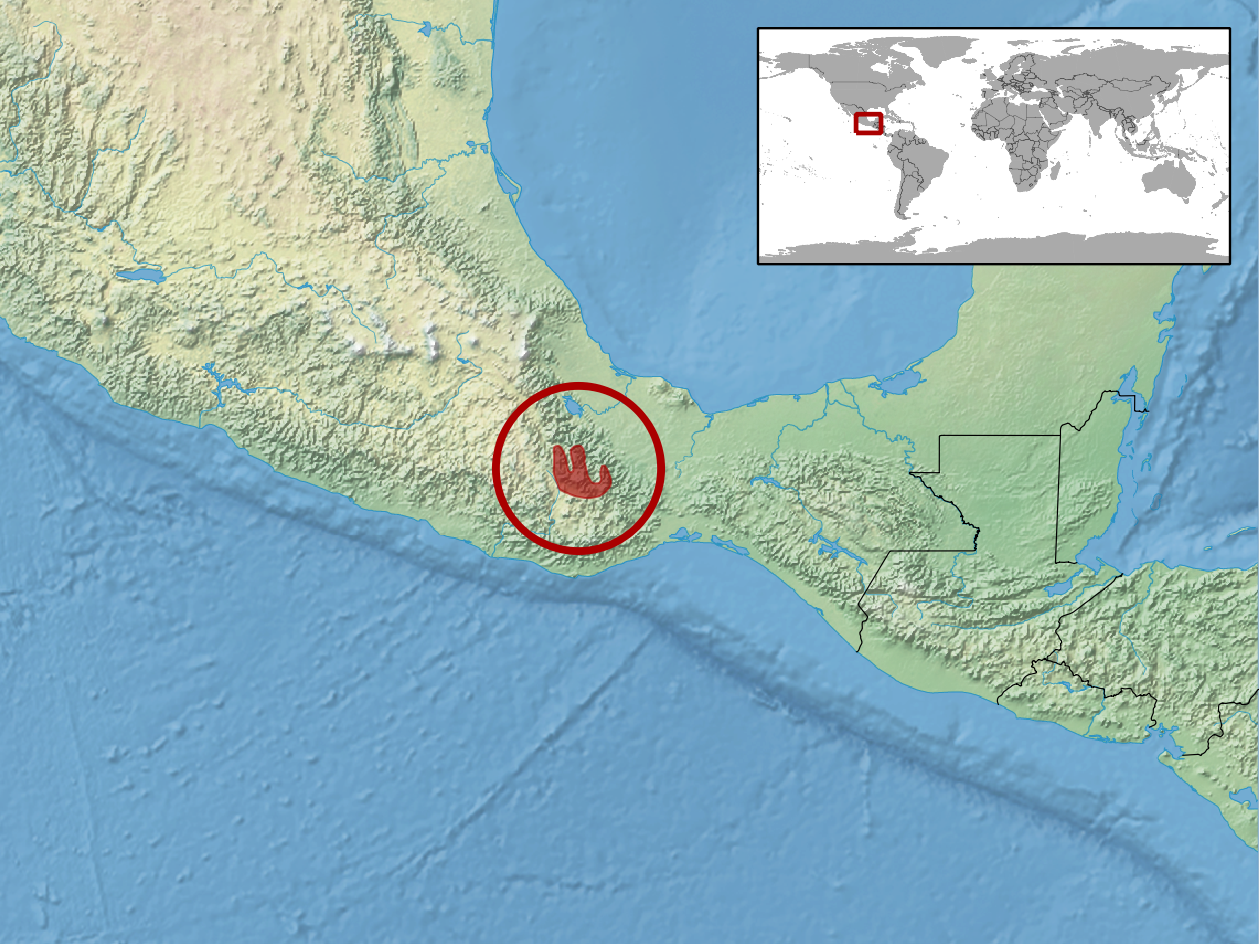

Species of lizard

The dwarf alligator lizard (Abronia viridiflava), is a species of lizard in the family Anguidae. The species is endemic to Mexico.
