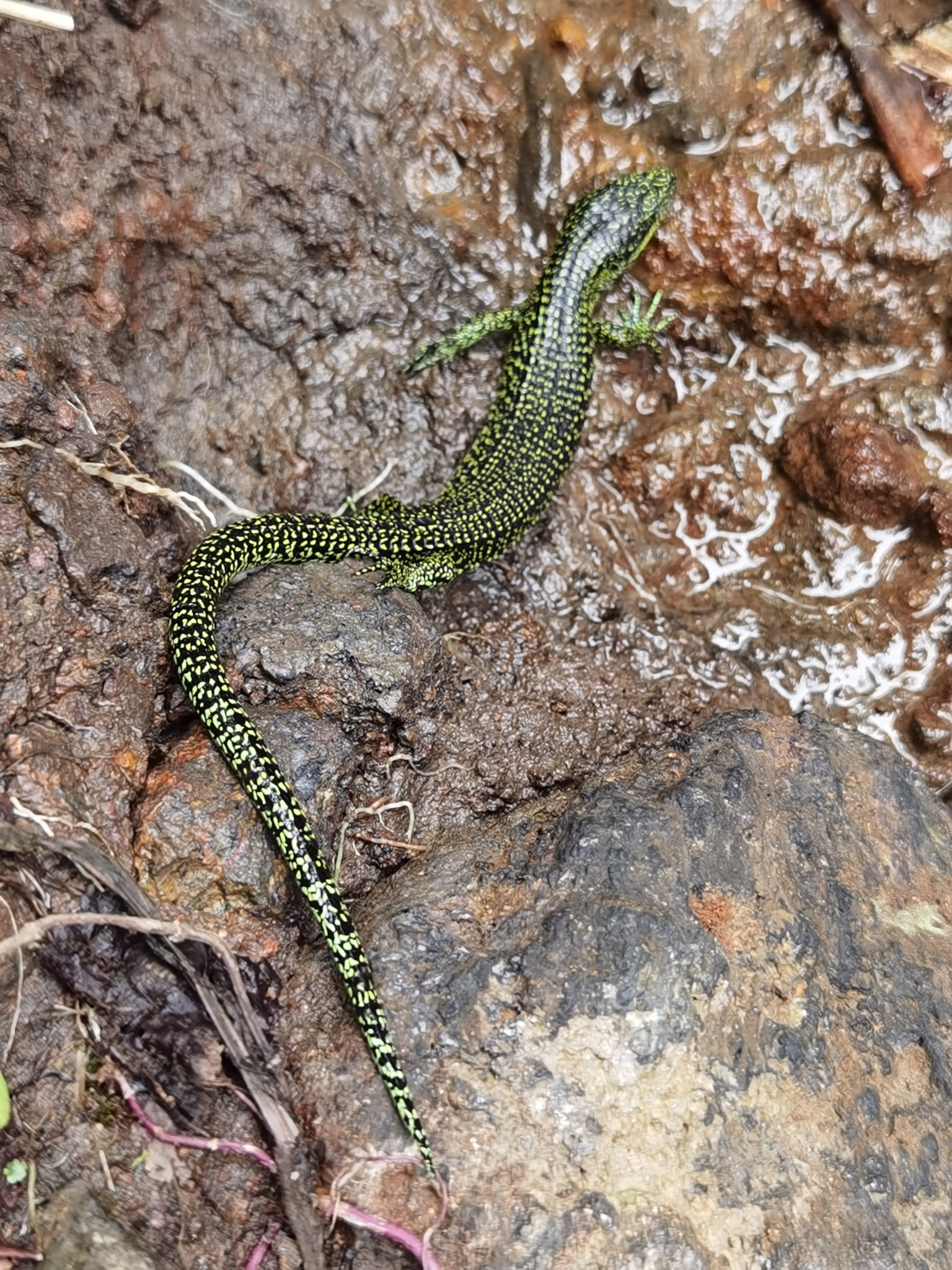

Conservation status
- Least Concern (IUCN 3.1)

Scientific classification
- Kingdom: Animalia
- Phylum: Chordata
- Class: Reptilia
- Order: Squamata
- Suborder: Anguimorpha
- Family: Anguidae
- Genus: Abronia
- Species: A. monticola

Binomial name
- Abronia monticola (Cope, 1878)
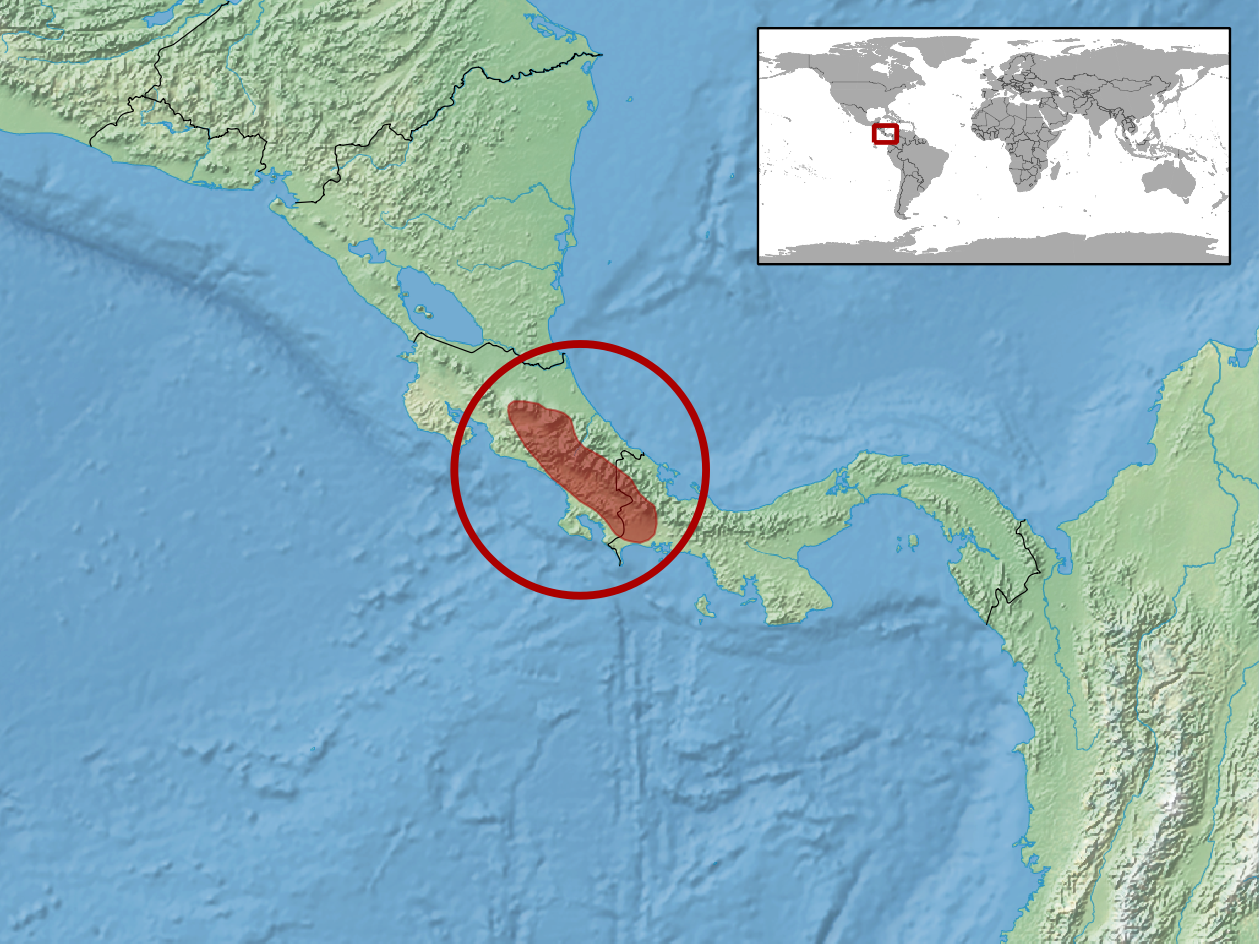

= Abronia monticola =

Species of lizard

Abronia monticola or montane alligator lizard is a species of lizard in the family Anguidae. The species is found in Costa Rica and Panama.
