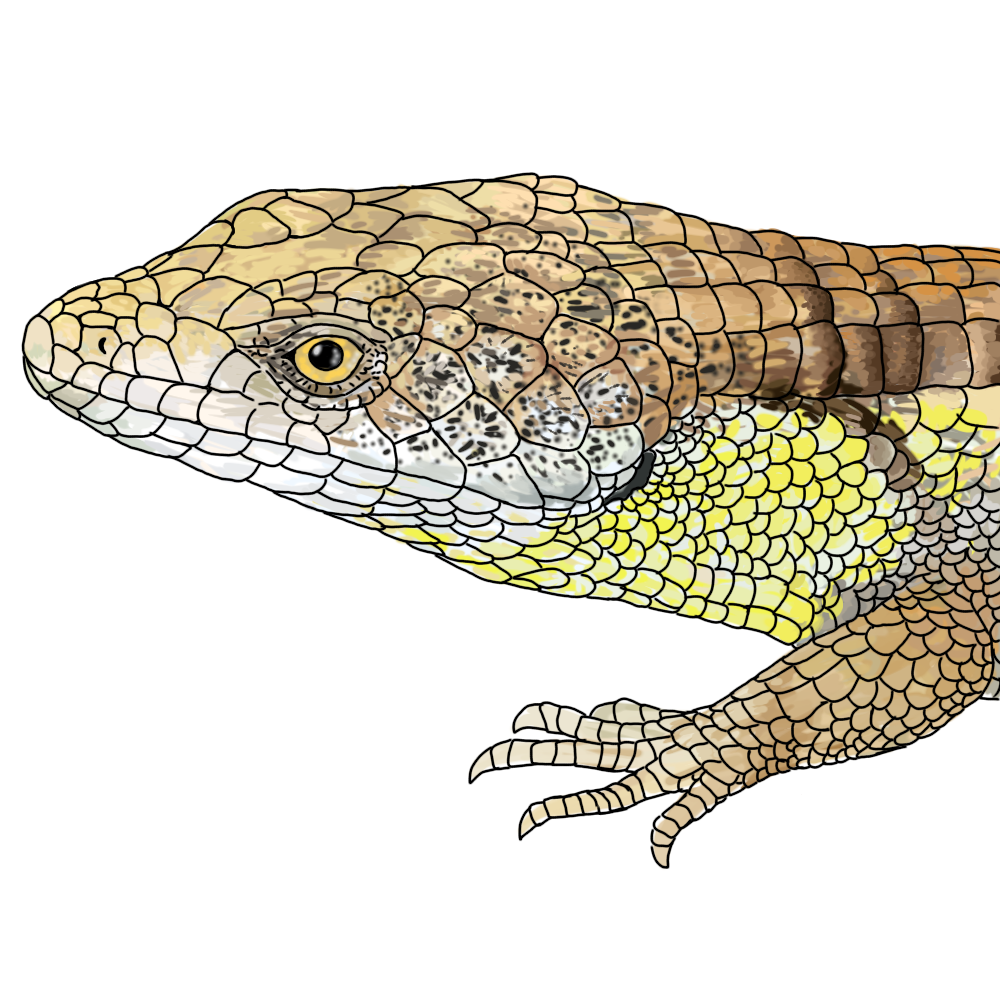

Scientific classification
- Kingdom: Animalia
- Phylum: Chordata
- Class: Reptilia
- Order: Squamata
- Suborder: Anguimorpha
- Family: Anguidae
- Genus: Abronia
- Species: A. morenica

Binomial name
- Abronia morenica Clause, Luna-Reyes, & Nieto-Montes De Oca, 2020

= Abronia morenica =

Species of lizard

Abronia morenica, the Sierra Morena arboreal alligator lizard, is a species of lizard in the family Anguidae. It is endemic to the Sierra Madre de Chiapas in southern Mexico. It is known from cloud forests at elevations of 1,480–1,800 m (4,860–5,910 ft) above sea level, including both highly mesic ridgeline and more arid lower slope woodlands.

== Description ==
Abronia morenica possesses three distinct features that differentiate it from the other members of the subgenus Lissabronia to which it has tentatively been assigned. These are (1) lack of frontonasal–frontal contact, (2) unexpanded supranasals, and (3) a lack of posterior subocular–primary temporal contact. Adult males measure 92–93 mm (3.6–3.7 in) in snout–vent length. The tail is about 1.6–1.7 times the snout–vent length.
