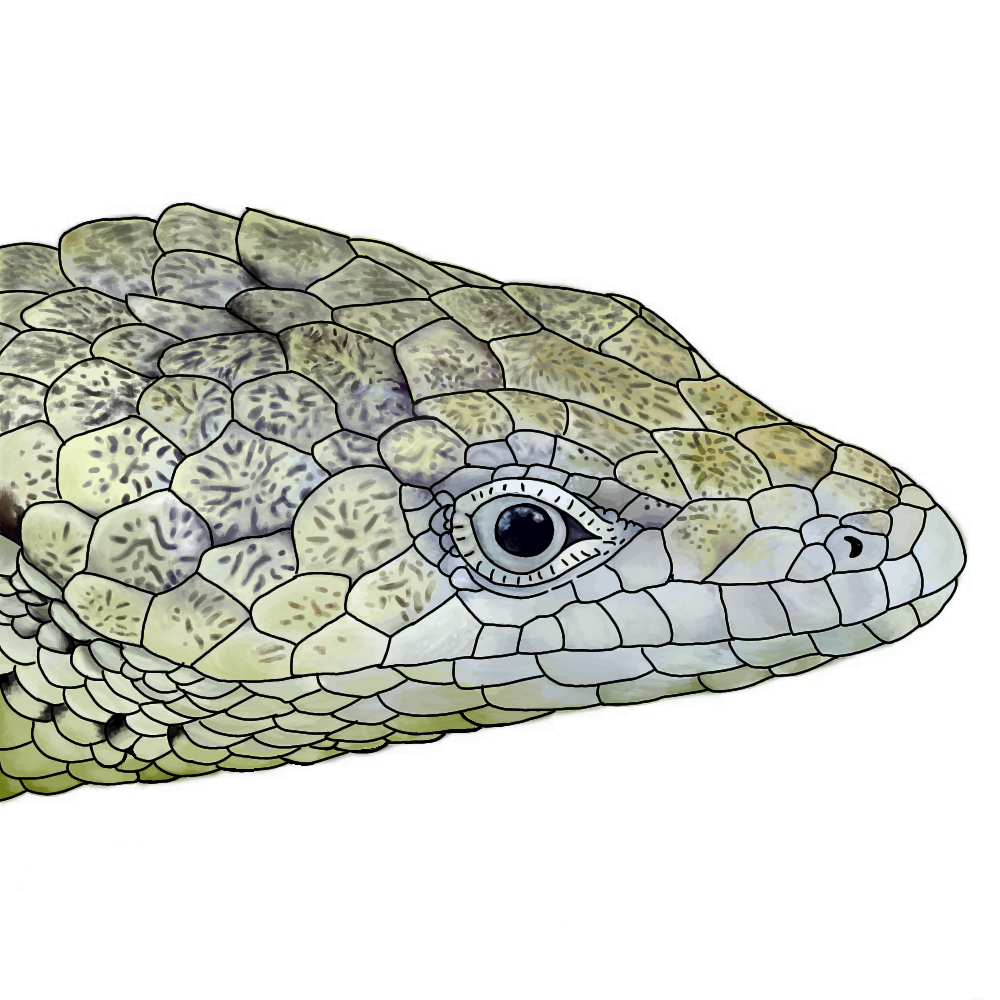

Scientific classification
- Kingdom: Animalia
- Phylum: Chordata
- Class: Reptilia
- Order: Squamata
- Suborder: Anguimorpha
- Family: Anguidae
- Genus: Abronia
- Species: A. zongolica

Binomial name
- Abronia zongolica García-Vázquez, Clause, Gutiérrez-Rodríguez, Cazares-Hernández, & Torre-Loranca, 2022

= Abronia zongolica =

Species of lizard

Abronia zongolica is a species of lizard in the family Anguidae. It was described in 2022 and is named after the Sierra de Zongolica mountain range. Adult males measure 96–112 mm (3.8–4.4 in) and adult females (based on a single specimen) 87 mm (3.4 in) in snout–vent length. The tail is up to 1.5 times the snout–vent length. It has a small range less than 10 kilometers wide in the Sierra de Zongolica between Ayahuatulco and Huapango. The lizard lives in mature pine-oak forests at elevations between 1,500 and 2,200 meters. It eats insects like grasshoppers, beetles, moths, and true bugs.

== Taxonomy ==
Abronia zongolica was described by the herpetologists Uri García-Vázquez and colleagues in 2022 on the basis of an adult male specimen collected from Ayahuatulco in Veracruz, Mexico. Specimens of the species had previously been misidentified as belonging to Abronia graminea. It is named after the Sierra de Zongolica mountain range, which have the only known populations of this species. The name of the range is derived from the Nahuatl words tzoncolican or tzoncolihucan, which mean 'where hair is braided'.

== Description ==
Adult males measure 96–112 mm (3.8–4.4 in) and adult females (based on a single specimen) 87 mm (3.4 in) in snout–vent length. The tail is up to 1.5 times the snout–vent length.

== Distribution and habitat ==
Abronia zongolica has a small range less than 10 kilometers wide in the Sierra de Zongolica between Ayahuatulco and Huapango. All known sightings are from the Río Alpatlahuaya watershed at elevations between 1,500 and 2,200 meters. Reports of similar lizards in other regions of west-central Veracruz may also represent this species.

Abronia zongolica lives in mature pine-oak forests with dominant species such Quercus conspersa, Q. crassifolia, Q. laurina, and Q. rugosa, alongside other trees like Alnus acuminata, Cupressus benthamii, C. lindleyi, and Pinus patula. These forests have abundant epiphytes, mostly bryophytes, but also including the bromeliad Tillandsia imperialis and the fern Elaphoglossum paleaceum. Most specimens of the lizard were seen hiding in bromeliads on tree trunks or branches up to 4 m above the ground. Other were also seen moving around in the branches of trees and shrubs during the daytime.

Abronia zongolica occurs alongside the Mexican alligator lizard in Astacinga and San Juan Texhuacán. The Mexican alligator lizard is generally more common and replaces A. zongolica entirely in high-elevation coniferous forests.

== Ecology ==
Abronia zongolica eats insects like grasshoppers, beetles, moths, and true bugs. Like other tree-dwelling Abronia species, it gives birth to live young in the spring. A captive female gave birth to four babies in early May, with each young measuring 30–33 mm in snout-to-vent length.
