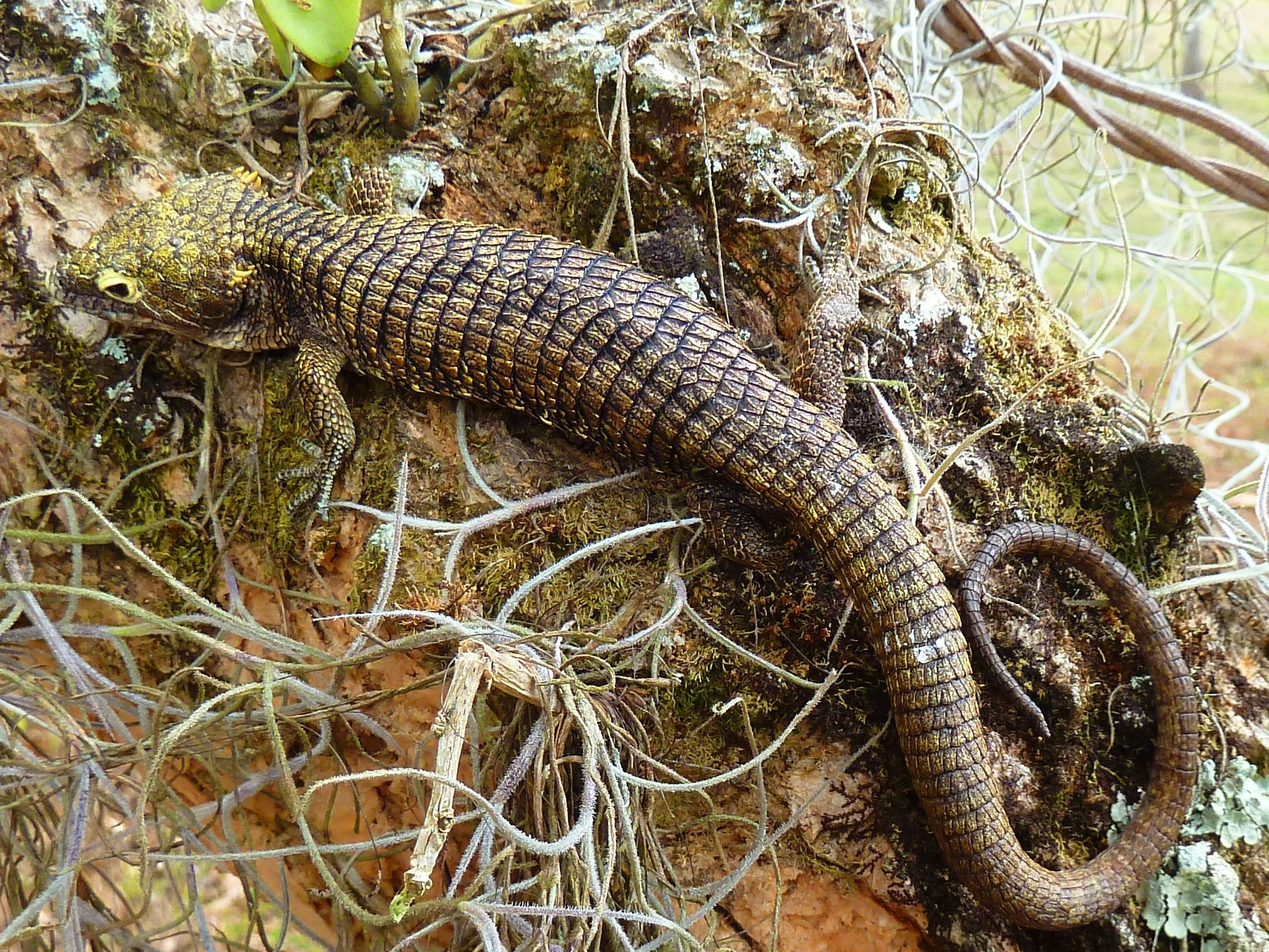
- In Guatemala.

Conservation status
- Critically Endangered (IUCN 3.1)
- CITES Appendix I

Scientific classification
- Kingdom: Animalia
- Phylum: Chordata
- Class: Reptilia
- Order: Squamata
- Suborder: Anguimorpha
- Family: Anguidae
- Genus: Abronia
- Species: A. campbelli

Binomial name
- Abronia campbelli Brodie & R. Savage, 1993

= Abronia campbelli =

Campbell's alligator lizard

Species of lizard

Abronia campbelli, commonly known as Campbell's alligator lizard, is species of critically endangered arboreal alligator lizard in the family Anguidae. Abronia campbelli is endemic to eastern Guatemala.

== Etymology ==
The specific name, campbelli, is in honor of American herpetologist Jonathan A. Campbell.

== Habitat ==
The preferred natural habitat of Abronia campbelli is forest, at altitudes of 1,800–1,900 m (5,900–6,200 ft).

== Reproduction ==
Abronia campbelli is ovoviviparous.
