= Abronia juarezi =

Conservation status
- Endangered (IUCN 3.1)

Scientific classification
- Kingdom: Animalia
- Phylum: Chordata
- Class: Reptilia
- Order: Squamata
- Suborder: Anguimorpha
- Family: Anguidae
- Genus: Abronia
- Species: A. juarezi

Binomial name
- Abronia juarezi (Karges & Wright, 1987)
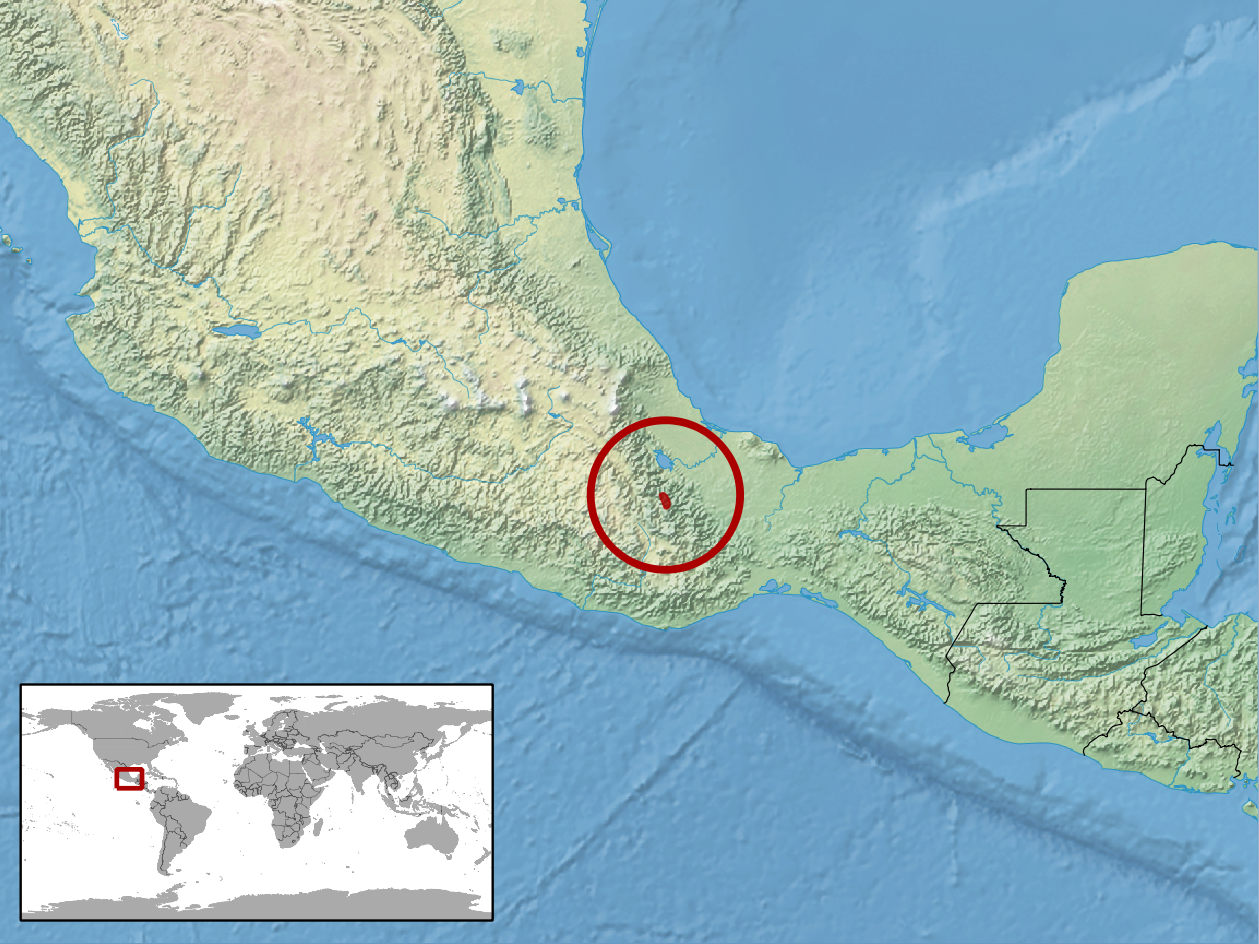

Synonyms
- Barisia juarezi Karges & Wright, 1987; Mesaspis juarezi (Karges & Wright, 1987)

Species of lizard

Abronia juarezi, also known commonly as the Sierra Juarez alligator lizard and el escorpión de Sierra de Juárez in Mexican Spanish, is a species of lizard in the family Anguidae. The species is endemic to the Sierra Juárez in the state of Oaxaca, Mexico.

== Etymology ==
The specific name, juarezi, refers to the Sierra Juárez mountain range.

== Habitat ==
The preferred natural habitat of A. juarezi is forest, at altitudes of 2,000–2,800 m (6,600–9,200 ft).

== Behavior ==
A. juarezi is terrestrial.

== Reproduction ==
A. juarezi is ovoviviparous.
