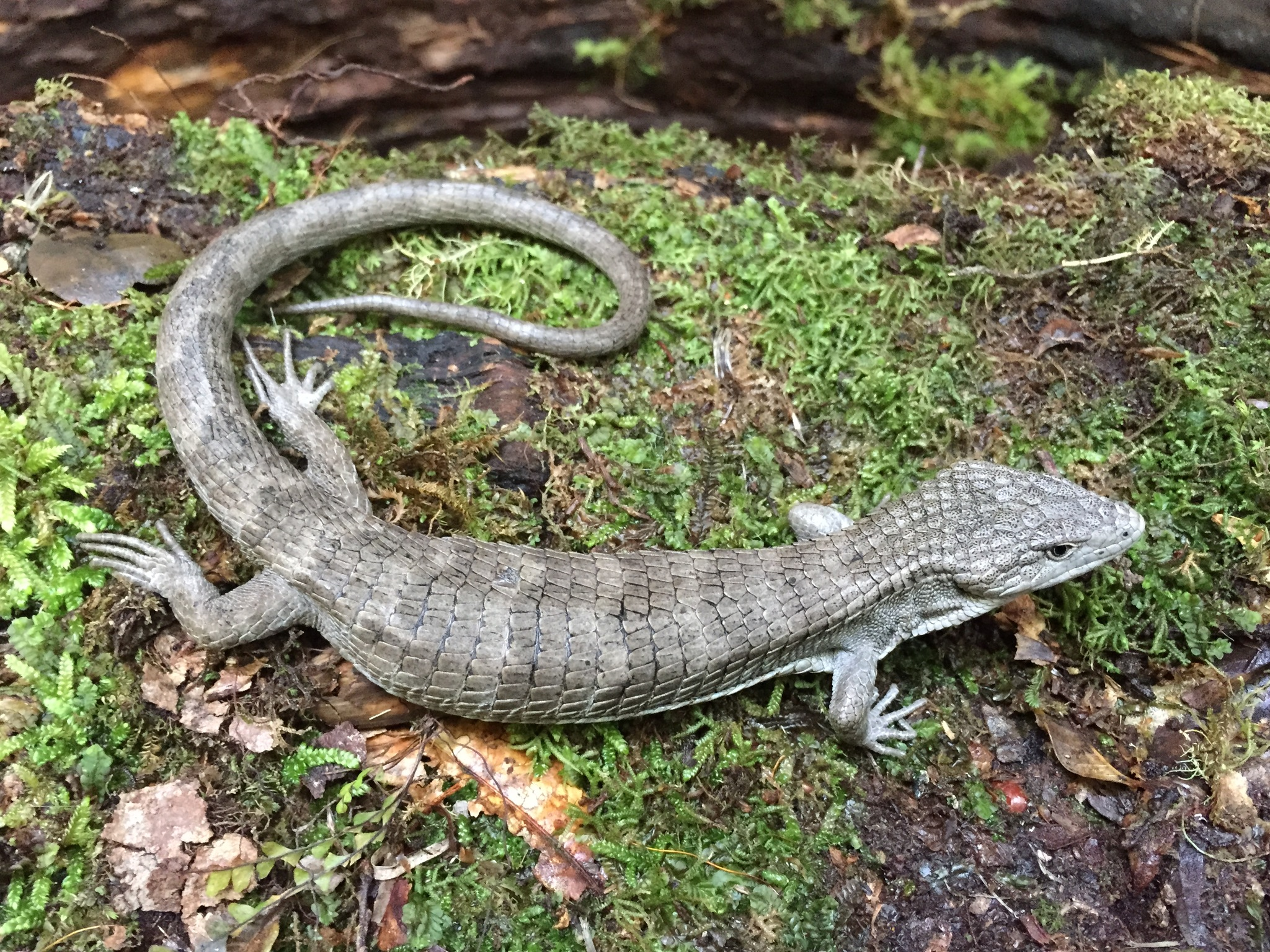

Conservation status
- Endangered (IUCN 3.1)
- CITES Appendix II

Scientific classification
- Kingdom: Animalia
- Phylum: Chordata
- Class: Reptilia
- Order: Squamata
- Suborder: Anguimorpha
- Family: Anguidae
- Genus: Abronia
- Species: A. montecristoi

Binomial name
- Abronia montecristoi Hidalgo, 1983

= Monte Cristo arboreal alligator lizard =

Species of lizard

The Monte Cristo arboreal alligator lizard (Abronia montecristoi) is an endangered species of lizard in the family Anguidae. The species is distributed in the cloud forests of El Salvador as well as Honduras. This species is classified as Endangered by the IUCN Red List

== Etymology ==
The specific name, montecristoi, refers to the type locality, "Hacienda Montecristo ".

== Characteristics ==
While there is not much known about A. montecristoi, McCranie and Wilson described the color of the back as antique brown, with pale, cinnamon-colored crossbands, with the color buff-yellow on the sides. The head is also colored cinnamon. The scales on the top of the head have little black dots. The sides of the head do not have these little black dots. The front limbs are cinnamon, with the back limbs being tawny. The tail is colored antique brown. Also on the tail are cinnamon-colored crossbands. On the underside, the color is cinnamon as well. The eyes are pale, and greenish silver. As the common name suggests, A. montecristoi is found primarily in trees.

== Ecology ==
There is very little known about the ecology of A. montecristoi. However, the species is an inhabitant of cloud forests which are a major source of biodiversity in the world. Cloud forests, as the name suggests, are covered by clouds because they are at high enough elevations where cloud formation occurs which ranges from about 5,000 to 10,000 ft (1,500 to 3,000 m). These cloud forests are a place where there is the constant flow of water because they are surrounded by clouds. This results in large biodiversity. Again, it is unclear how A. montecristoi intereacts with its environment, but this species does live primarily in the trees of the cloud forests.

== Conservation ==
Since A. montecristoi inhabits many cloud forests, its future looks bleak. The reason for this is because many of the cloud forest are steadily disappearing. Some scientists estimate that the cloud forests will disappear in the near future. These cloud forests are a major place of biodiversity. A. montecristoi is just one of a vast number of species that call these forests home. Conservation efforts are currently being made by the Tropical Montane Cloud Forest Initiative which is made up of three conservations program consisting of the United Nations Environment Program, the World Conservation Union, and the World Wide Fund for Nature.
