= Abronia meledona =

Conservation status
- Endangered (IUCN 3.1)
- CITES Appendix I

Scientific classification
- Kingdom: Animalia
- Phylum: Chordata
- Class: Reptilia
- Order: Squamata
- Suborder: Anguimorpha
- Family: Anguidae
- Genus: Abronia
- Species: A. meledona

Binomial name
- Abronia meledona Campbell & Brodie, 1999

Species of lizard

Abronia meledona is an endangered species of arboreal alligator lizard described in 1999 by Campbell and Brodie from Guatemala.
