= Abronia martindelcampoi =

Conservation status
- Endangered (IUCN 3.1)
- CITES Appendix II

Scientific classification
- Kingdom: Animalia
- Phylum: Chordata
- Class: Reptilia
- Order: Squamata
- Suborder: Anguimorpha
- Family: Anguidae
- Genus: Abronia
- Species: A. martindelcampoi

Binomial name
- Abronia martindelcampoi Flores-Villela & Sánchez-Herrera, 2003
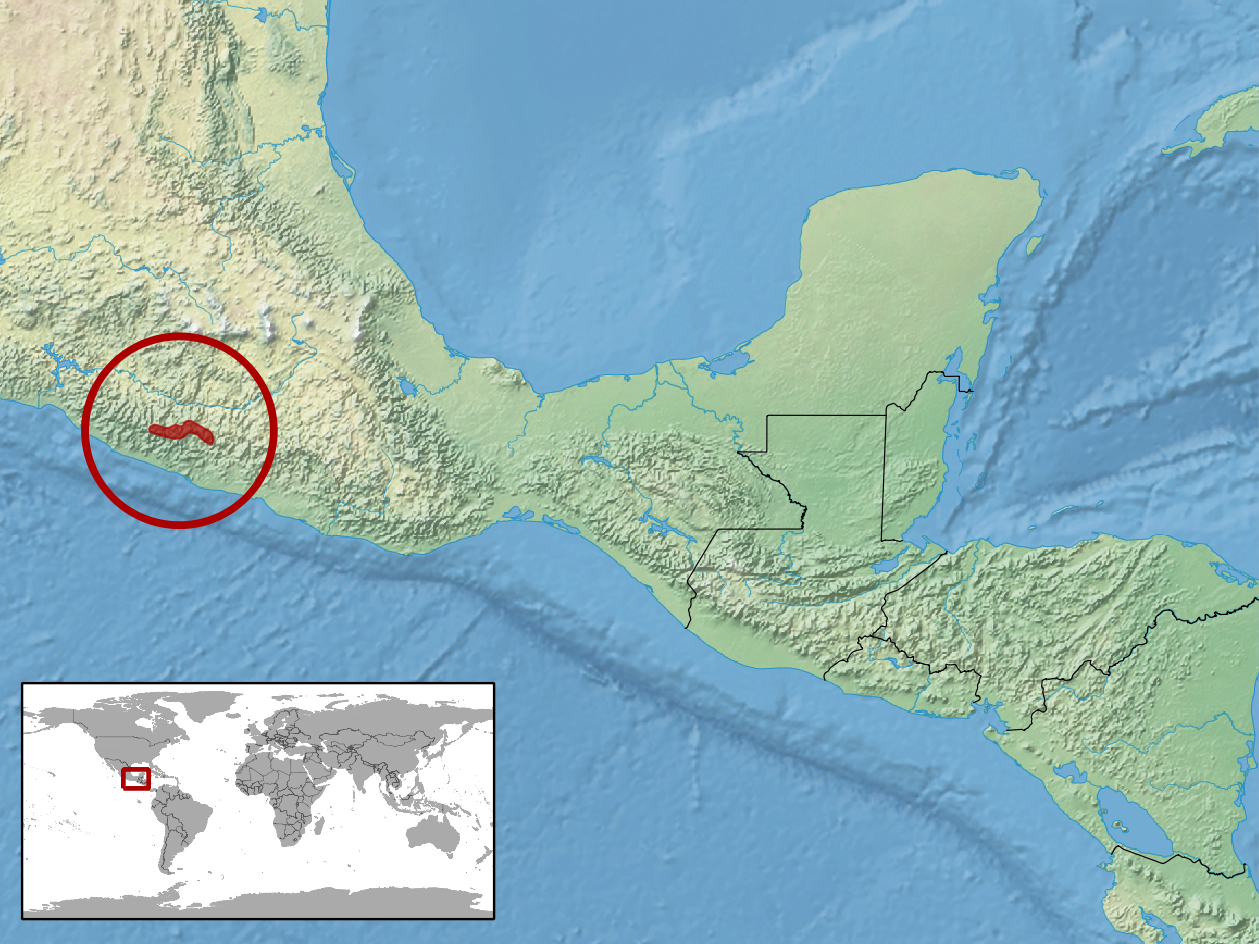

Species of lizard

Abronia martindelcampoi, also known commonly as Martín del Campo's arboreal alligator lizard and escorpión arborícola de Martín del Campo in Mexican Spanish, is an endangered species of lizard in the family Anguidae. The species is endemic to Mexico, and was described in 2003 by Flores-Villela and Sánchez-Herrera.

== Etymology ==
The specific name, martindelcampoi, is in honor of Mexican herpetologist Rafael Martín del Campo.

== Geographic range ==
Abronia martindelcampoi has been found only in the Mexican state of Guerrero.

== Habitat ==
The preferred natural habitat of Abronia martindelcampoi is forest, at altitudes of approximately 2,250 m (7,380 ft).

== Reproduction ==
Abronia martindelcampoi is viviparous.
