= Abronia gadovii =

Conservation status
- Least Concern (IUCN 3.1)

Scientific classification
- Kingdom: Animalia
- Phylum: Chordata
- Class: Reptilia
- Order: Squamata
- Suborder: Anguimorpha
- Family: Anguidae
- Genus: Abronia
- Species: A. gadovii

Binomial name
- Abronia gadovii (Boulenger, 1913)
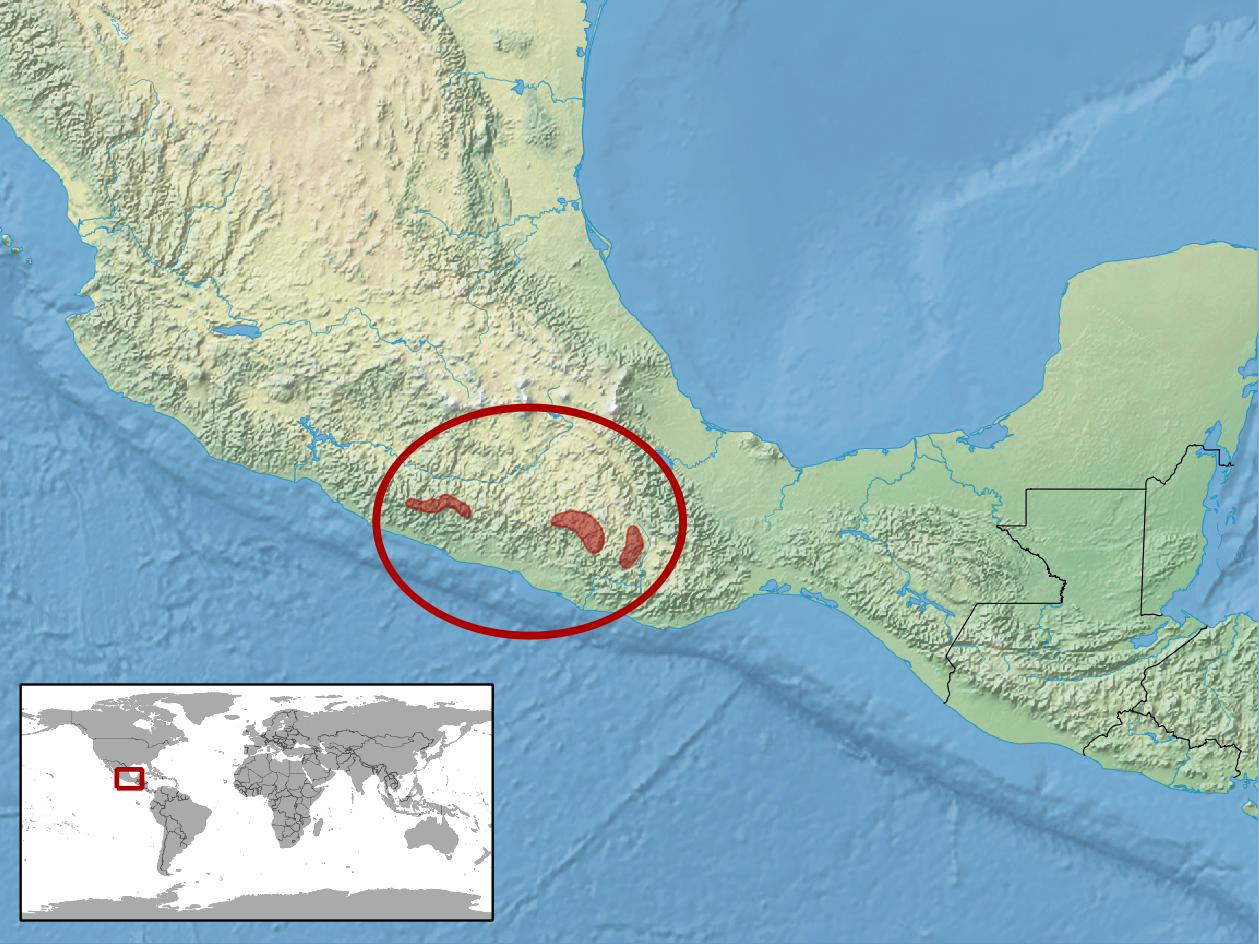

Synonyms
- Gerrhonotus gadovii Boulenger, 1913; Barisia gadovii — Tihen, 1949; Mesaspis gadovii — Good, 1988; Abronia gadovii — Gutiérrez-Rodríguez et al., 2020

Species of lizard

Abronia gadovii, also known commonly as Gadow's alligator lizard and el escorpión de Gadow in Mexican Spanish, is a species of lizard in the family Anguidae. The species is endemic to the highlands of the Sierra Madre del Sur in Guerrero and Oaxaca, Mexico. Two subspecies are recognized:

== Etymology ==
The specific name, gadovii, is in honor of German ornithologist Hans Friedrich Gadow.

== Habitat ==
The preferred natural habitat of A. gadovii is forest, including second-growth forest.

== Description ==
A. gadovii may attain a snout-to-vent length (SVL) of about 9 cm (3.5 in), plus a tail length of about 15 cm (5.9 in).

== Diet ==
A. gadovii preys predominately upon insects, and is known to also devour small lizards.

== Reproduction ==
A. gadovii is ovoviviparous.

== Subspecies ==
Two subspecies are recognized as being valid including the nominotypical subspecies.

- Abronia gadovii gadovii (Boulenger, 1913) – Guerrero
- Abronia gadovii levigata (Tihen, 1949) – Oaxaca

Nota bene: A trinomial authority in parentheses indicates that the subspecies was originally described in a genus other than Abronia.
