= Abronia fimbriata =

Conservation status
- Endangered (IUCN 3.1)
- CITES Appendix I

Scientific classification
- Kingdom: Animalia
- Phylum: Chordata
- Class: Reptilia
- Order: Squamata
- Suborder: Anguimorpha
- Family: Anguidae
- Genus: Abronia
- Species: A. fimbriata

Binomial name
- Abronia fimbriata (Cope, 1884)

Synonyms
- Barissia fimbriata Cope, 1884

Species of lizard

Abronia fimbriata is a species of lizard endemic to the mountains of east-central Guatemala, including Sierra de Xucaneb, Sierra de las Minas, Sierra de Chuacús and Sierra de los Cuchumatanes, and is found in the cloud forests at elevations of 1,400–2,100 m. Its extent of occurrence is estimated to be only 1,500 km^{2}, and is considered to be endangered.

It is listed as endangered because of its very limited range within 1,500 km^{2}, and its further decline of habitat will cause the population to fall since it is only found in the cloud forests. It is also traded illegally in the pet trade. The apparent threat to A. fimbriata's habitat is from agriculture and the exportation of ornamental Chamaedaphne calyculata plants to Japan and Europe.

Conservation efforts are being made to save A. fimbriata. It can be found in several protected areas such as Biotopo Universitario Mario Dary Rivera and Reserva de Biosfera Sierra de Las Minas and several private reserves.
