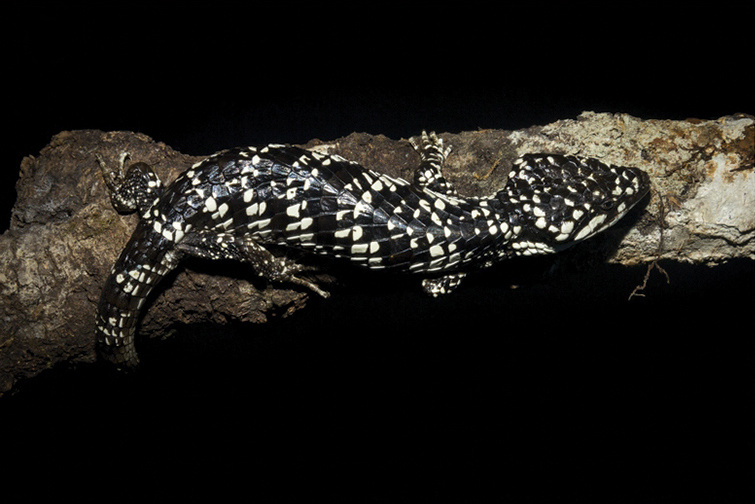

Conservation status
- Endangered (IUCN 3.1)
- CITES Appendix II

Scientific classification
- Kingdom: Animalia
- Phylum: Chordata
- Class: Reptilia
- Order: Squamata
- Suborder: Anguimorpha
- Family: Anguidae
- Genus: Abronia
- Species: A. deppii

Binomial name
- Abronia deppii (Wiegmann, 1828)
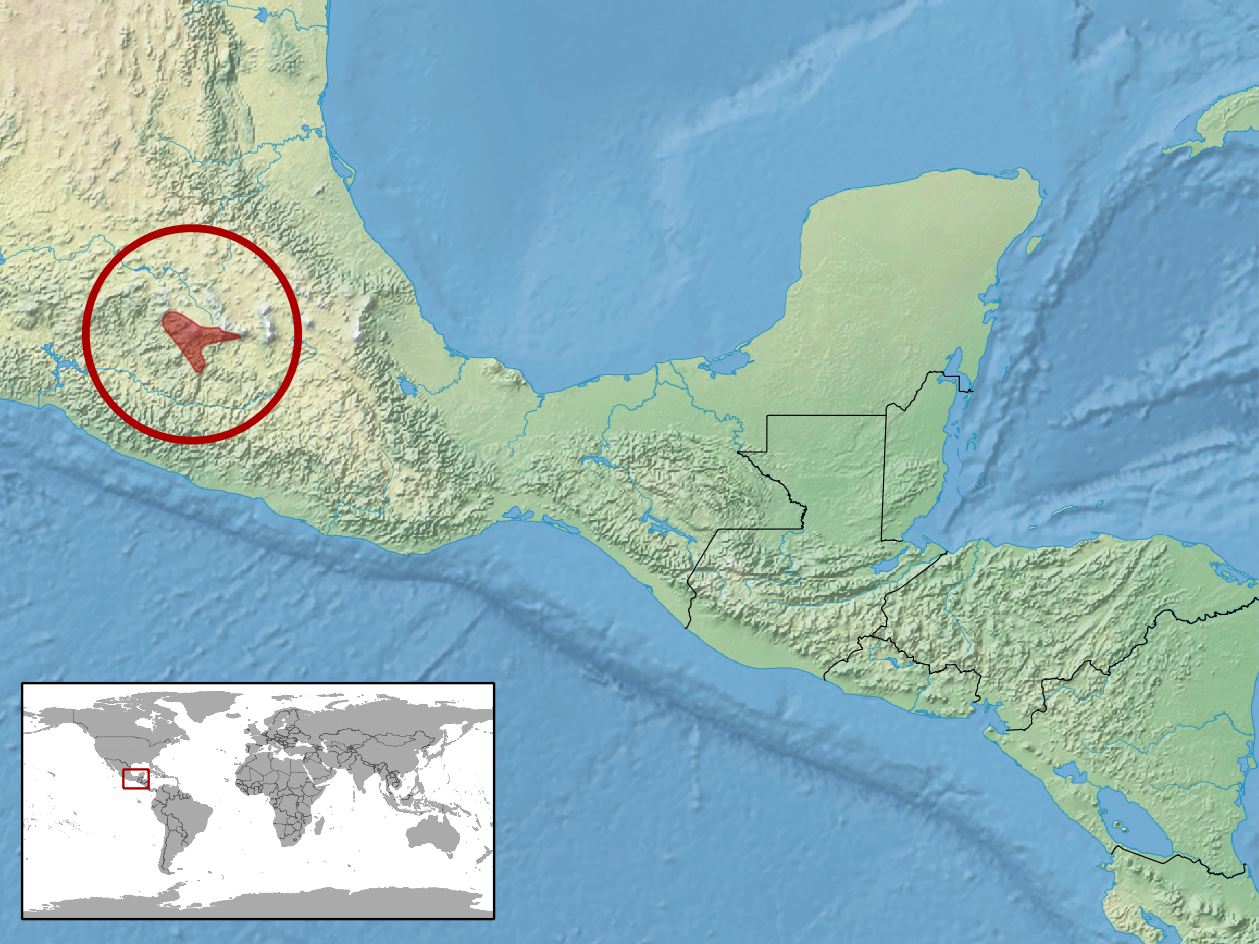

Synonyms
- Gerrhonotus deppii Wiegmann, 1828; Abronia deppii — Gray, 1838; Gerrhonotus deppii — A.M.C. Duméril & Bibron, 1839; Abronia deppii — H.M. Smith & Taylor, 1950; Gerrhonotus deppii — Wermuth, 1969; Abronia deppii — Liner, 1994

= Abronia deppii =

Species of lizard

Abronia deppii, Deppe's arboreal alligator lizard, is an endangered species of arboreal alligator lizard in the family Anguidae. The species was described in 1828 by Arend Friedrich August Wiegmann, and it is endemic to Mexico.

== Etymology ==
The specific name, deppii, is in honor of German naturalist Ferdinand Deppe.

== Geographic range ==
A. deppii is found in the mountains of the Mexican states of Guerrero and Morelos.

== Habitat ==
The preferred natural habitat of A. deppii is forest.

== Description ==
Dorsally, A. deppii is black and white.

== Reproduction ==
A. deppii is viviparous.
