= Abronia antauges =

Conservation status
- Data Deficient (IUCN 3.1)

Scientific classification
- Kingdom: Animalia
- Phylum: Chordata
- Class: Reptilia
- Order: Squamata
- Suborder: Anguimorpha
- Family: Anguidae
- Genus: Abronia
- Species: A. antauges

Binomial name
- Abronia antauges (Cope, 1866)
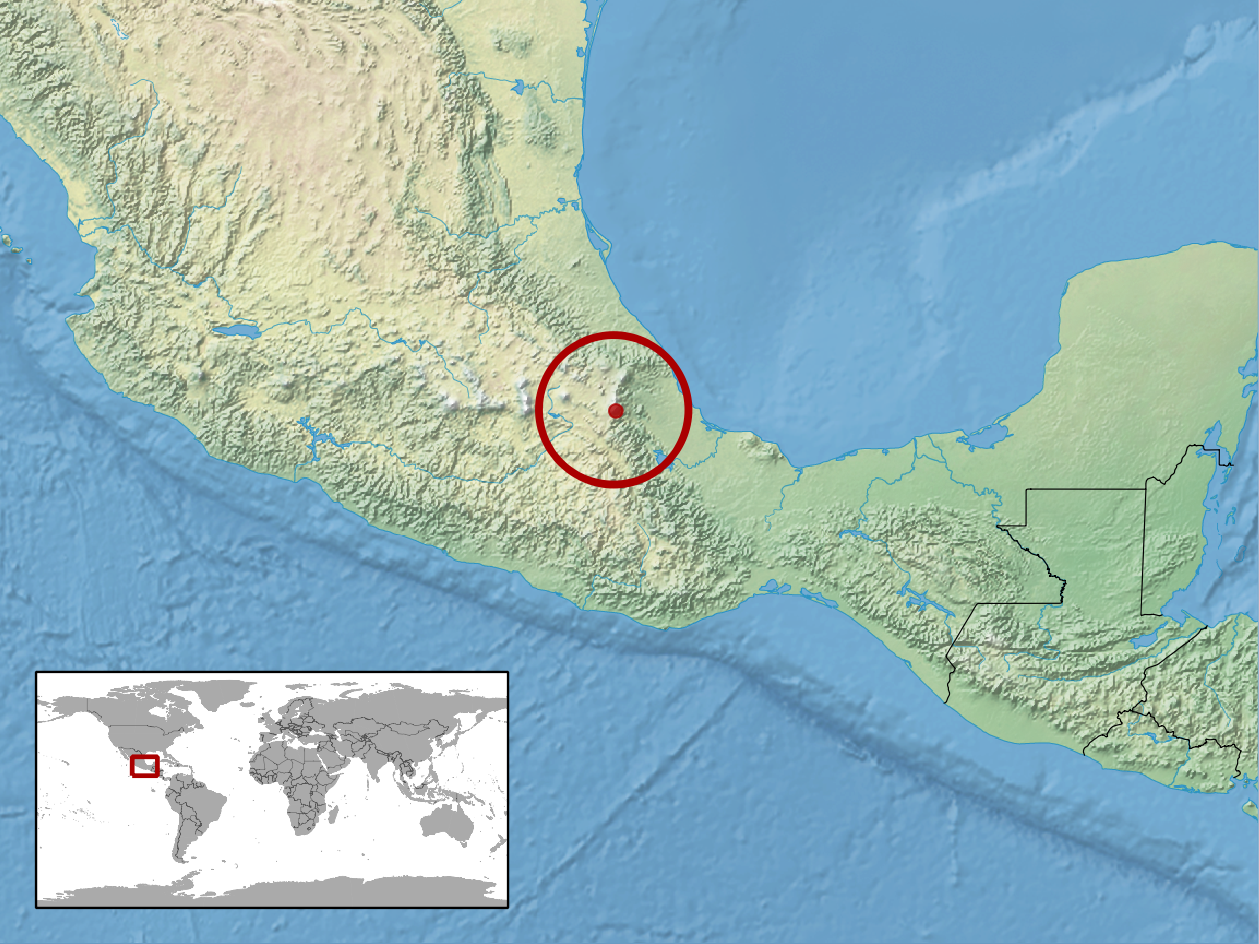

Species of lizard

Abronia antauges (Mount Orizaba alligator lizard) is a species of lizard in the family Anguidae. The species is endemic to Veracruz, Mexico.
