= Abronia cuchumatanus =

Scientific classification
- Kingdom: Animalia
- Phylum: Chordata
- Class: Reptilia
- Order: Squamata
- Suborder: Anguimorpha
- Family: Anguidae
- Genus: Abronia
- Species: A. cuchumatanus

Binomial name
- Abronia cuchumatanus (Solano-Zavaleta, Nieto-Montes de Oca, & Campbell, 2016)

Species of lizard

The Cuchumatanes alligator lizard (Abronia cuchumatanus), is a species of lizard in the family Anguidae. The species is endemic to Guatemala.
