= Abronia vasconcelosii =

Conservation status
- Vulnerable (IUCN 3.1)
- CITES Appendix II

Scientific classification
- Kingdom: Animalia
- Phylum: Chordata
- Class: Reptilia
- Order: Squamata
- Suborder: Anguimorpha
- Family: Anguidae
- Genus: Abronia
- Species: A. vasconcelosii

Binomial name
- Abronia vasconcelosii (Bocourt, 1872)

Synonyms
- Gerrhonotus casvonvelosii Bocourt, 1872 [1871]

Species of lizard

Abronia vasconcelosii, sometimes known as Bocourt's arboreal alligator lizard, is a species of lizard in the family Anguidae. It is endemic to the plateau of the Guatemalan Highlands, where it occurs in lower montane moist forest and cloud forest habitat at elevations around 2,000–2,200 m (6,600–7,200 ft) above sea level. Abronia vasconcelosii exhibits complex aggressive behavior patterns, including approaches, head flexing, and body arching, particularly during male-male encounters where aggression is more pronounced, leading to biting behaviors directed at the tail.
