= Abronia ornelasi =

Conservation status
- Data Deficient (IUCN 3.1)
- CITES Appendix II

Scientific classification
- Kingdom: Animalia
- Phylum: Chordata
- Class: Reptilia
- Order: Squamata
- Suborder: Anguimorpha
- Family: Anguidae
- Genus: Abronia
- Species: A. ornelasi

Binomial name
- Abronia ornelasi Campbell, 1984
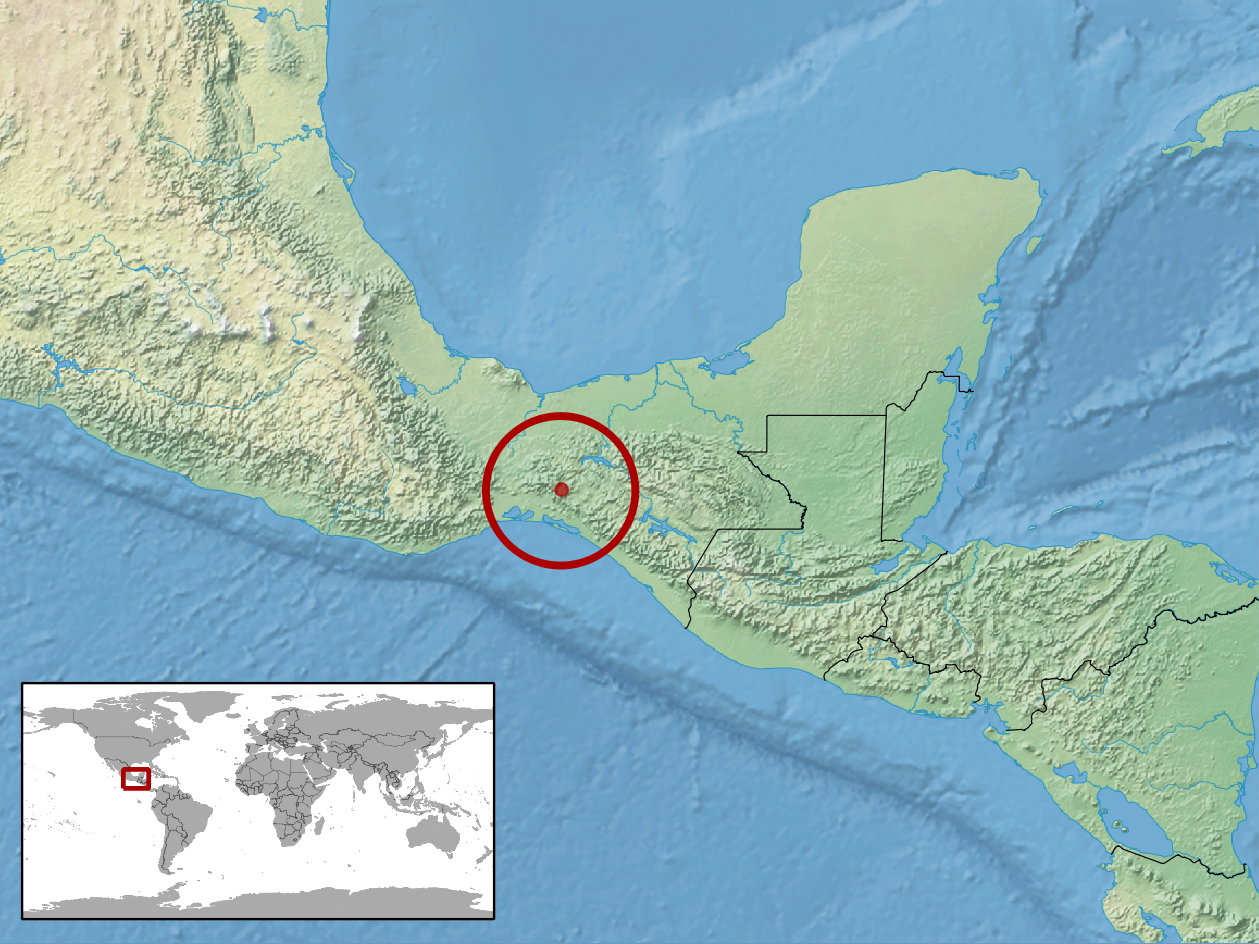

Synonyms
- Abronia ornelasi Campbell, 1984; Abronia (Abaculabronia) ornelasi — Campbell & Frost, 1993; Abronia ornelasi — Liner, 1994

Species of lizard

Abronia ornelasi, also known commonly as Ornelas's arboreal alligator lizard, the Cerro Baul alligator lizard, and escorpión arboricola de Ornelas in Mexican Spanish, is a species of arboreal alligator lizard in the subfamily Gerrhonotinae of the family Anguidae. The species, which was originally described in 1984 by Jonathan A. Campbell, is native to southern Mexico.

== Etymology ==
The specific name, ornelasi, is in honor of Julio Ornelas Martinez who assisted Campbell in fieldwork in Mexico.

== Geographic range ==
Abronia ornelasi is endemic to the Mexican state of Oaxaca.

== Habitat ==
The natural habitat of Abronia ornelasi is cloud forest at altitudes of 1,500–1,600 m (4,900–5,200 ft).

== Reproduction ==
Abronia ornelasi is viviparous.
