= Abronia ramirezi =

Conservation status
- Data Deficient (IUCN 3.1)
- CITES Appendix II

Scientific classification
- Kingdom: Animalia
- Phylum: Chordata
- Class: Reptilia
- Order: Squamata
- Suborder: Anguimorpha
- Family: Anguidae
- Genus: Abronia
- Species: A. ramirezi

Binomial name
- Abronia ramirezi Campbell, 1994
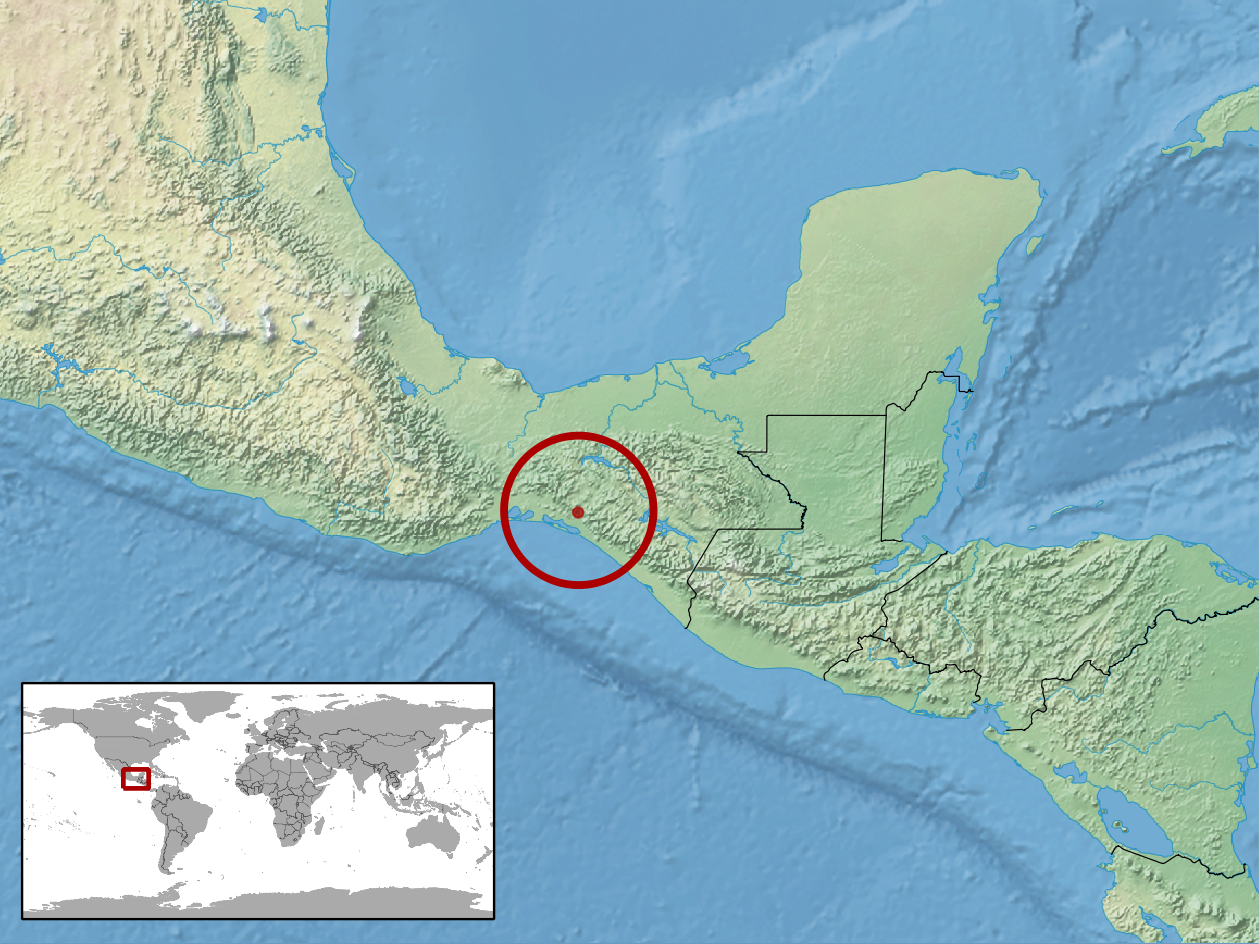

Species of lizard

Abronia ramirezi, Ramirez's alligator lizard, is species of arboreal alligator lizard in the family Anguidae. The species, which was described in 1994 by Campbell, is endemic to Mexico.

== Etymology ==
The specific name, ramirezi, is in honor of Mexican herpetologist Antonio Ramirez Velazquez.

== Geographic range ==
A. ramirezi is found in the Mexican state of Chiapas.

== Habitat ==
The preferred habitat of A. ramirezi is forest at an altitude of 1,350 m (4,430 ft).

== Reproduction ==
A. ramirezi is oviparous.
