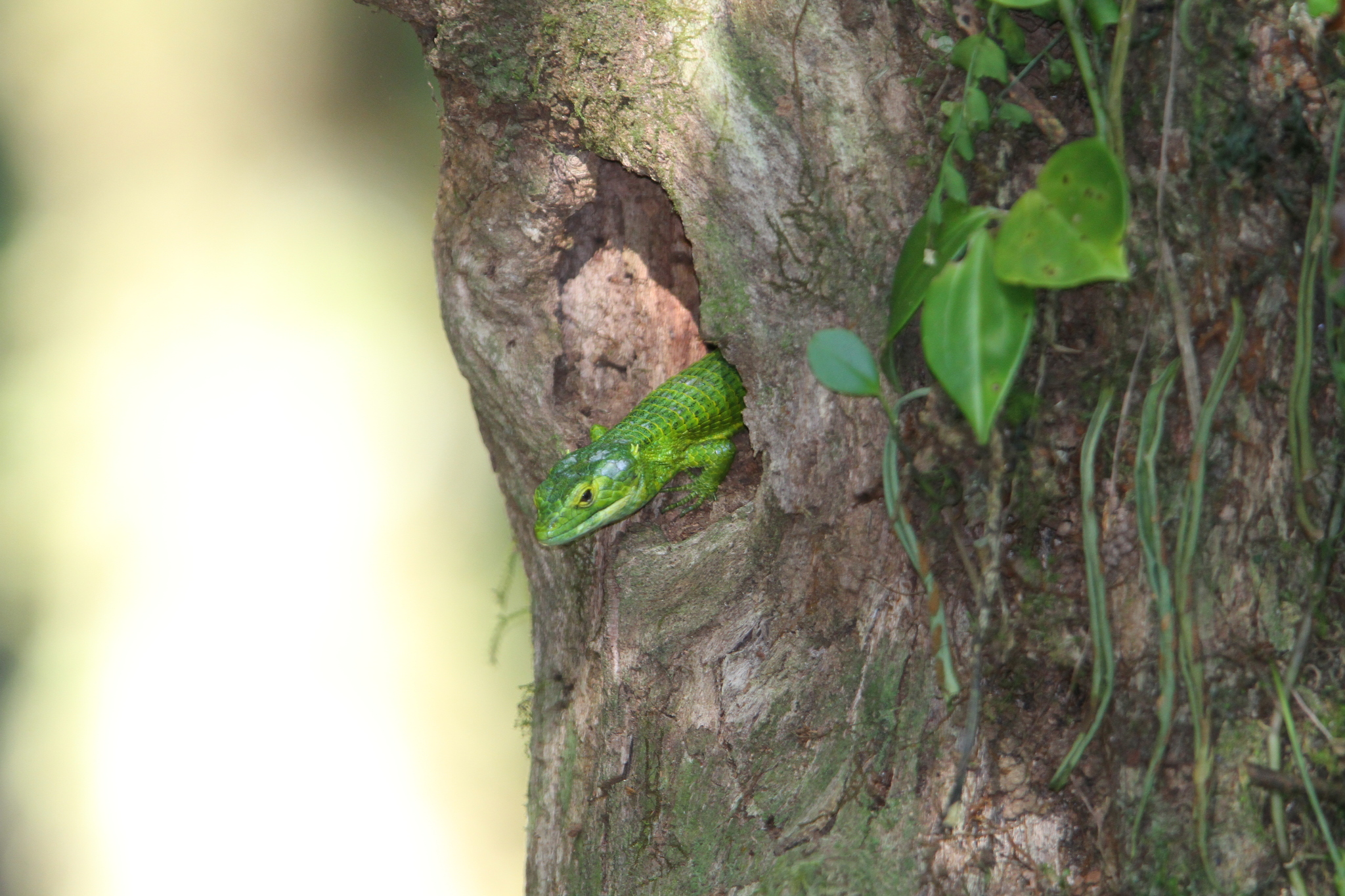

Conservation status
- Least Concern (IUCN 3.1)
- CITES Appendix II

Scientific classification
- Kingdom: Animalia
- Phylum: Chordata
- Order: Squamata
- Suborder: Anguimorpha
- Family: Anguidae
- Genus: Abronia
- Species: A. smithi

Binomial name
- Abronia smithi Campbell & Frost, 1993
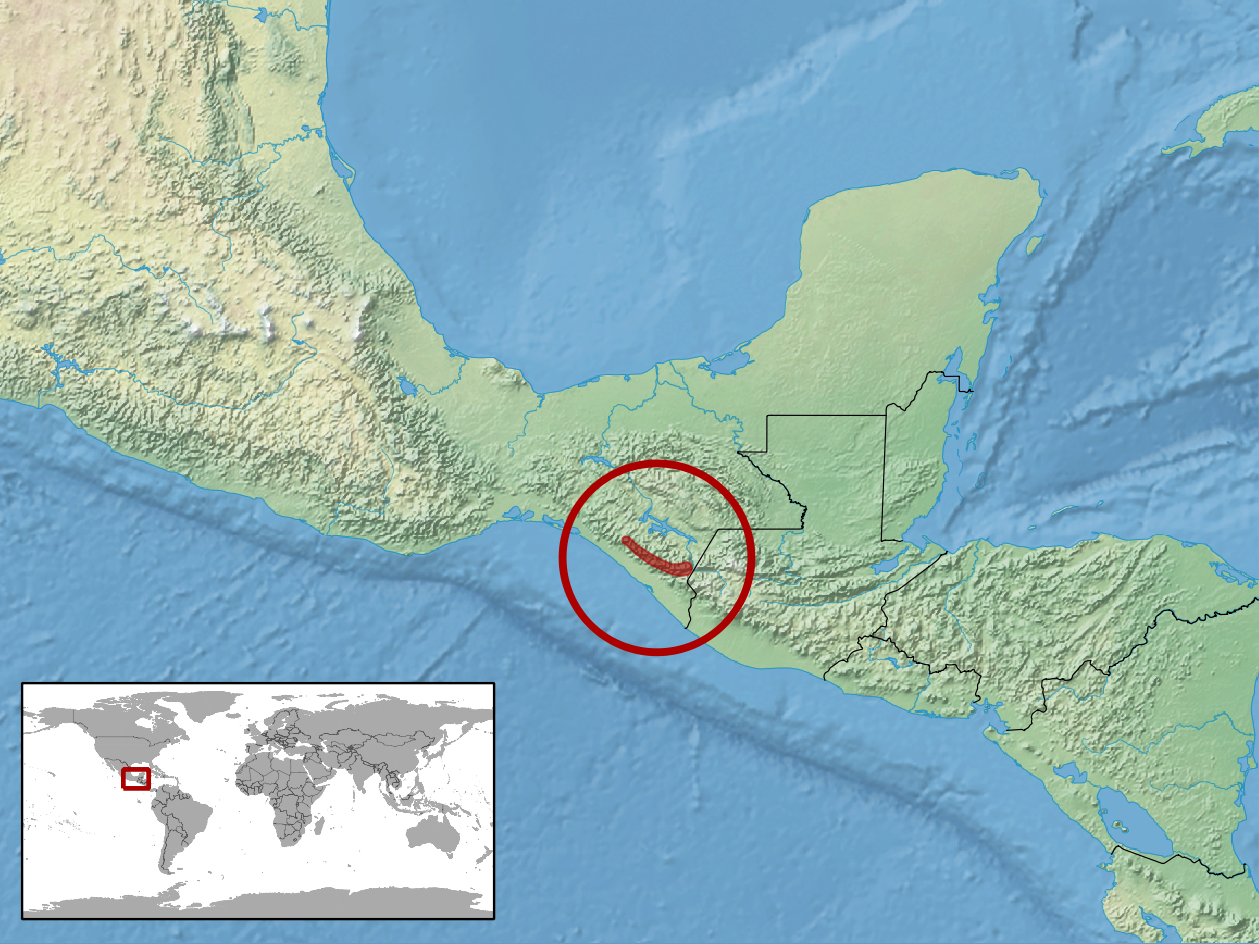

= Abronia smithi =

Species of lizard

Abronia smithi is a species of lizard in the family Anguidae. Known by the common name Smith's arboreal alligator lizard, the species is endemic to the state of Chiapas in Mexico.

== Taxonomy and etymology ==
A. smithi was described in 1993 by Jonathan A. Campbell and Darrel Frost, and named after the American herpetologist Hobart Muir Smith.

== Habitat and geographic range ==
A. smithi is an arboreal species which lives in the canopies of large trees in the cloud forests of the Sierra Madre de Chiapas. Its elevational range is 1,800–2,800 m (5,900–9,200 ft) above sea level.

== Reproduction ==
A. smithi is viviparous.

== Conservation status ==
A. smithi is only known to exist in a few localities in Chiapas. It is uncommon and may be threatened by deforestation, but it occurs in protected habitat, including the El Triunfo Biosphere Reserve.
