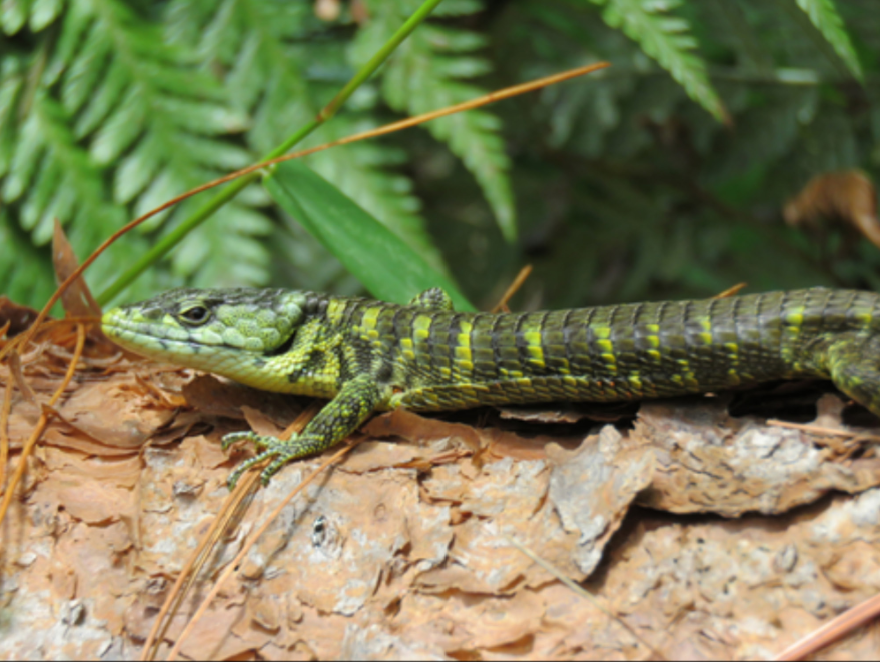

Conservation status
- Endangered (IUCN 3.1)
- CITES Appendix II

Scientific classification
- Kingdom: Animalia
- Phylum: Chordata
- Class: Reptilia
- Order: Squamata
- Suborder: Anguimorpha
- Family: Anguidae
- Genus: Abronia
- Species: A. fuscolabialis

Binomial name
- Abronia fuscolabialis Tihen, 1944
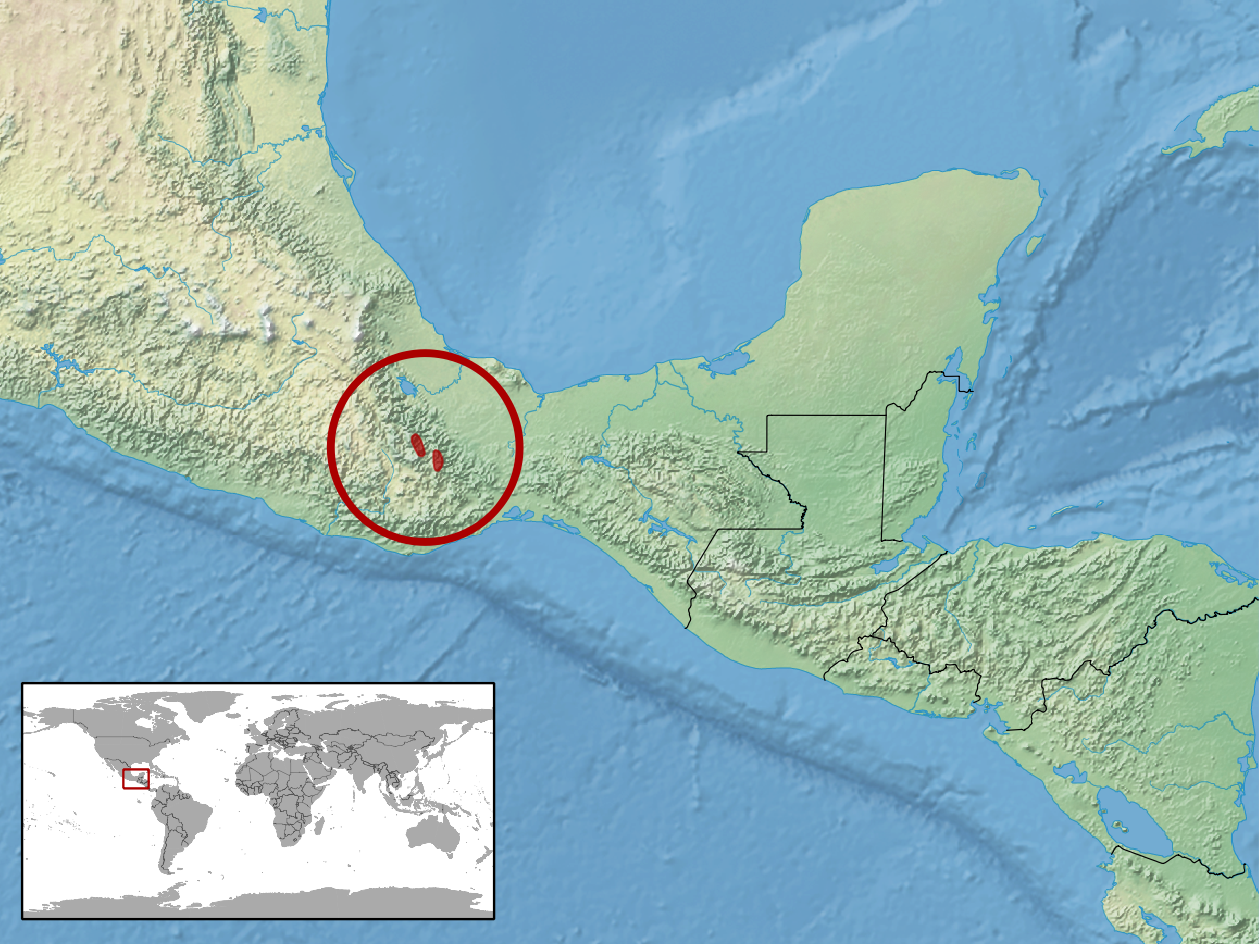

Synonyms
- Gerrhonotus fuscolabialis Tihen 1944; Abronia kalaina Good & Schewenk 1985

= Abronia fuscolabialis =

Species of lizard

Abronia fuscolabialis, the Mount Zempoaltepec arboreal alligator lizard, is an endangered arboreal alligator lizard endemic to Oaxaca, Mexico.

== Distribution ==
The Mount Zempoaltepec arboreal alligator lizard is a canopy-dwelling lizard endemic to the Northern Sierra mountains of Oaxaca, Mexico. Specimens have been collected from cloud forests and pine-oak forests in Sierra Mixe and Sierra Juárez at elevations between 2160 and 2440m above sea level.

== Morphology ==
Juveniles are beige with dark brown or black crossbands. Adult coloration ranges from yellow-green to green, to turquoise. The color of individuals has been noted to change after a couple of months in captivity, suggesting that color is a reflection of environmental conditions.

The Mount Zempoaltepec arboreal alligator lizard is distinguished from other Abronia lizards by the presence of a pale "arrowhead" marking on the dorsal head and by dark markings on the side of the head and neck.

Snout-to-vent lengths of adult specimens have measured between 11−12cm.

Abronia lizards have prehensile tails which can regrow if damaged.

== Natural history and ecology ==
Due to its rarity, little is known on the Mount Zempoaltepec arboreal alligator lizard specifically. It has been observed hiding on the ground, suggesting that it is not exclusively arboreal.

Other members of the genus Arborea are diurnal and give birth to live young.

== Description and taxonomy ==
The Mount Zempoaltepec arboreal alligator lizard was first described by the American herpetologist Joseph Anton Tihen as Gerrhonotus fuscolabialis based on two specimens collected from Mt. Zempoaltepec in Oaxaca. The scientific name was chosen in reference to the darker pattern of scales along the lips and chin which distinguish Abronia fuscolabialis from its congeners; fuscolabialis comes from the Latin fuscus, meaning dark, and labialis, pertaining to the lips. The holotype is held at the American Museum of Natural History.

The previously-described sympatric taxon Abronia kalaina is now considered to be synonymous with A. fuscolabialis.

== Threats and conservation ==
The Mount Zempoaltepec arboreal alligator lizard is considered to be endangered by the IUCN as the species' known range consists of less than 5,000km^{2}. The species has been observed in areas of forest harvested for timber production. As of 2018 the species was not present in any nationally protected conservation areas.

== Gallery ==
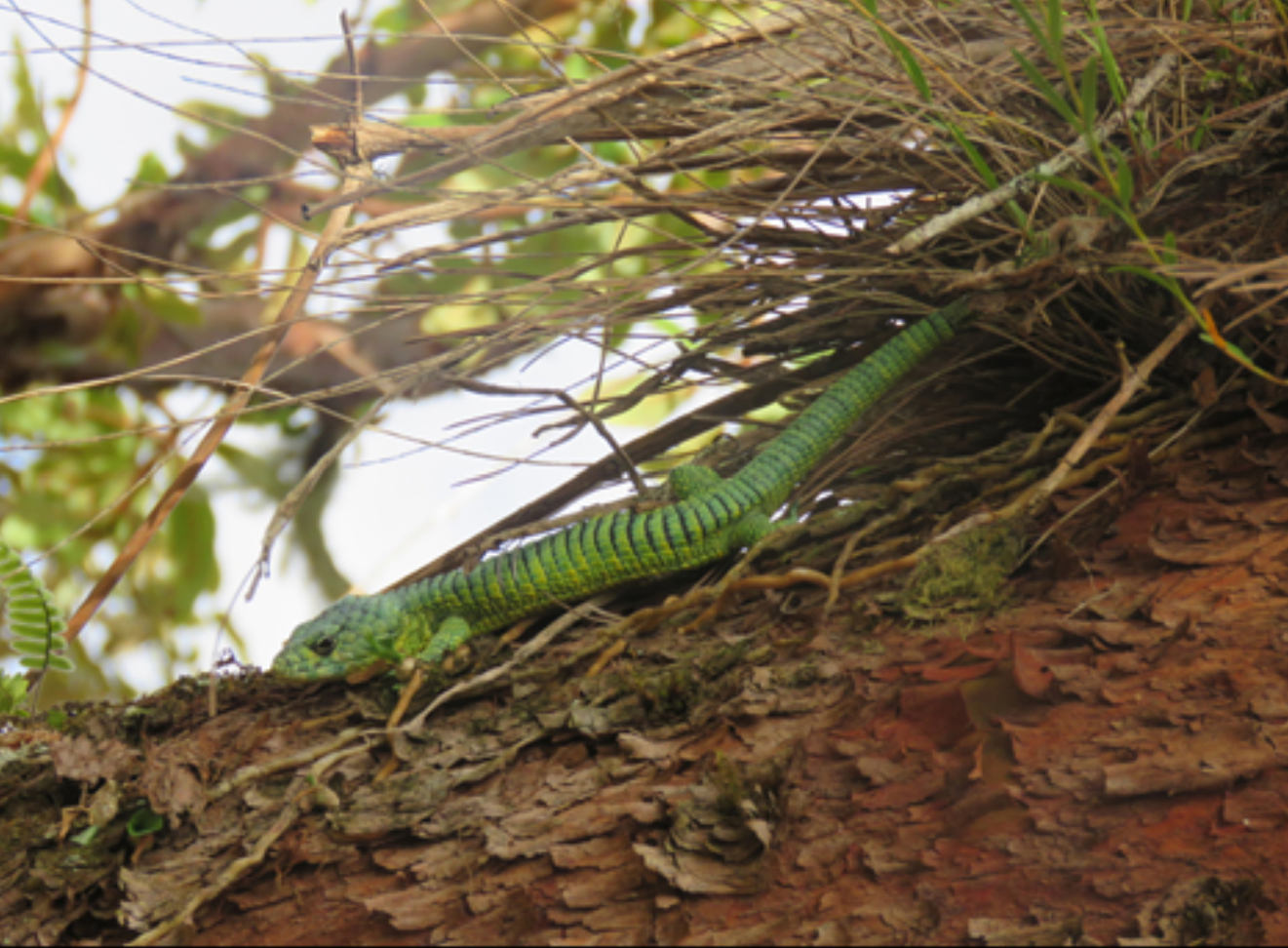
An adult Mount Zempoaltepec arboreal alligator lizard resting over a bromeliad in La Aplanada

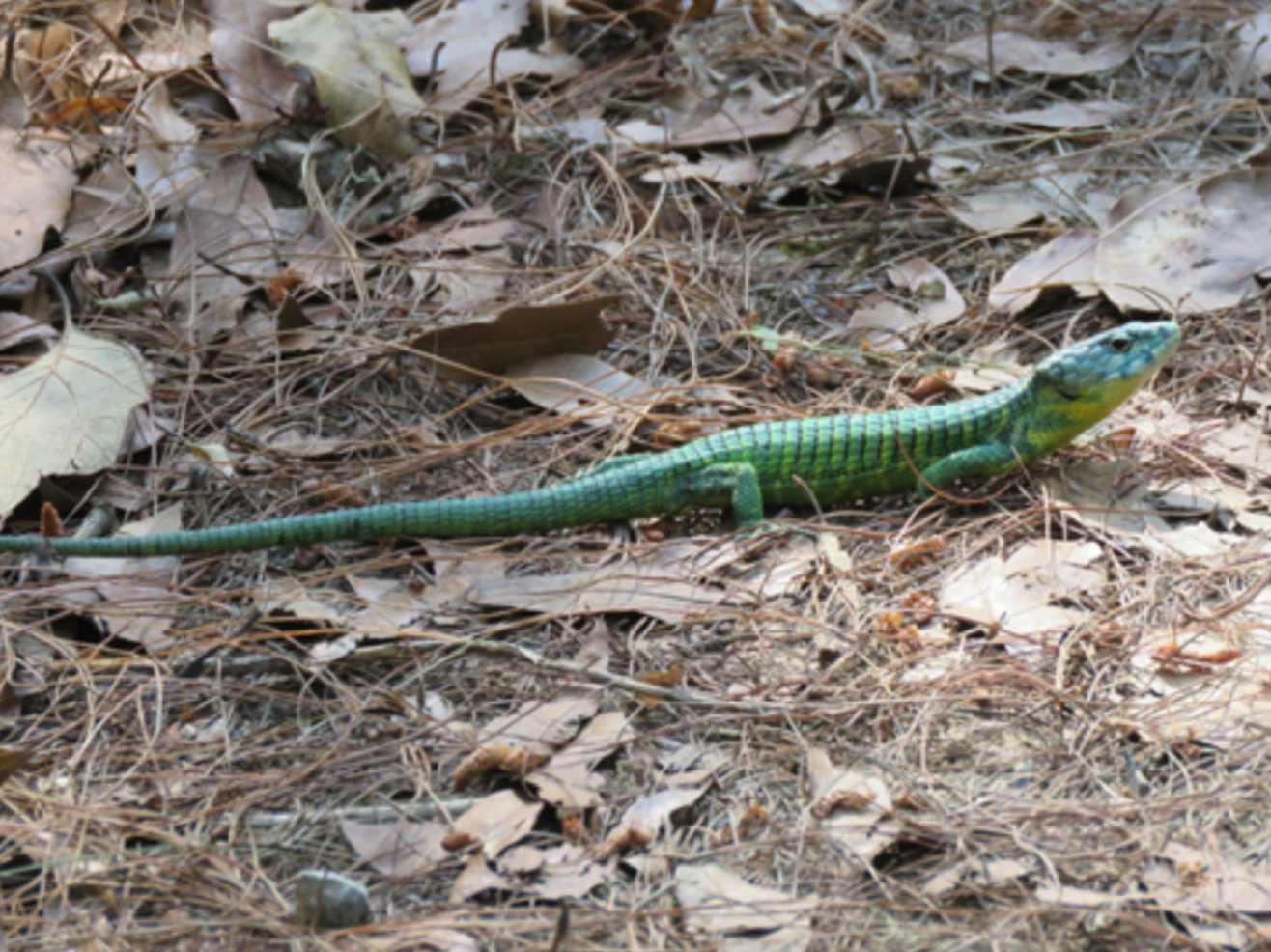
An adult Mount Zempoaltepec arboreal alligator lizard in Arroyo Cuache
