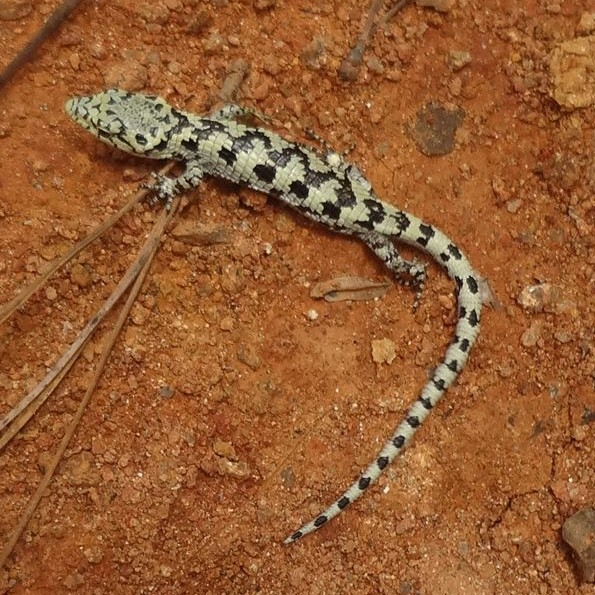

Conservation status
- Vulnerable (IUCN 3.1)
- CITES Appendix II

Scientific classification
- Kingdom: Animalia
- Phylum: Chordata
- Class: Reptilia
- Order: Squamata
- Suborder: Anguimorpha
- Family: Anguidae
- Genus: Abronia
- Species: A. mixteca

Binomial name
- Abronia mixteca Bogert & Porter, 1967
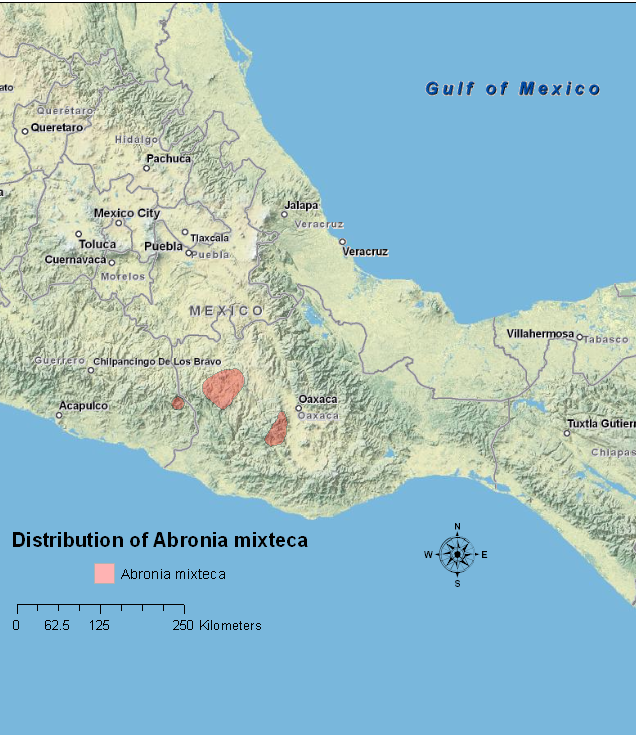
- Range in pink

= Abronia mixteca =

Species of lizard

Abronia mixteca , the Mixtecan arboreal alligator lizard, is a vulnerable species of arboreal alligator lizards described in 1967 by Charles Mitchill Bogert and Ann Porter. It is endemic to the Guerrero and Oaxaca states of Mexico.
