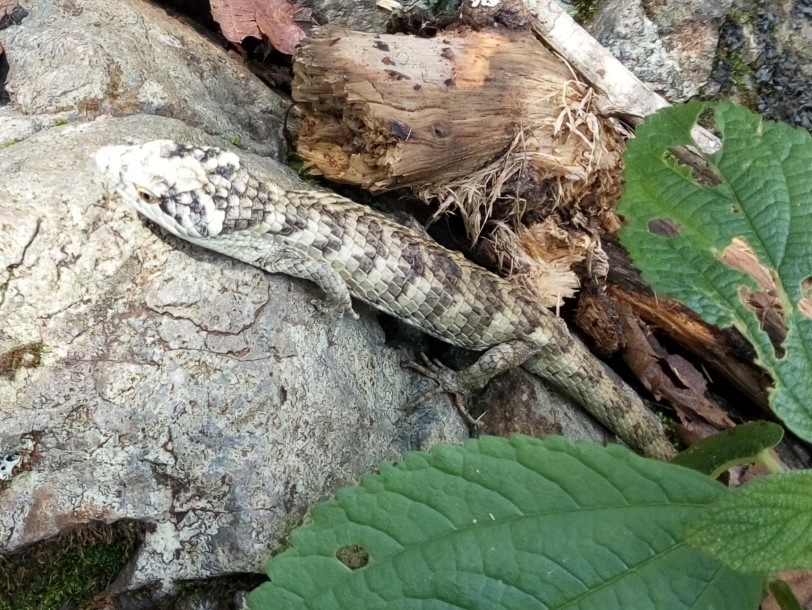

Conservation status
- CITES Appendix II

Scientific classification
- Kingdom: Animalia
- Phylum: Chordata
- Class: Reptilia
- Order: Squamata
- Suborder: Anguimorpha
- Family: Anguidae
- Genus: Abronia
- Species: A. cuetzpali

Binomial name
- Abronia cuetzpali Campbell, Solano-Zavaleta, Flores-Villela, Caviedes-Solís, and Frost, 2016

= Abronia cuetzpali =

Species of lizard, Anguidae family

Abronia cuetzpali is a species of arboreal alligator lizard described in 2016 by Campbell, Solano-Zavaleta, Flores-Villela, Caviedes-Solís and Frost from the Sierra de Miahuatlán of Oaxaca, Mexico.

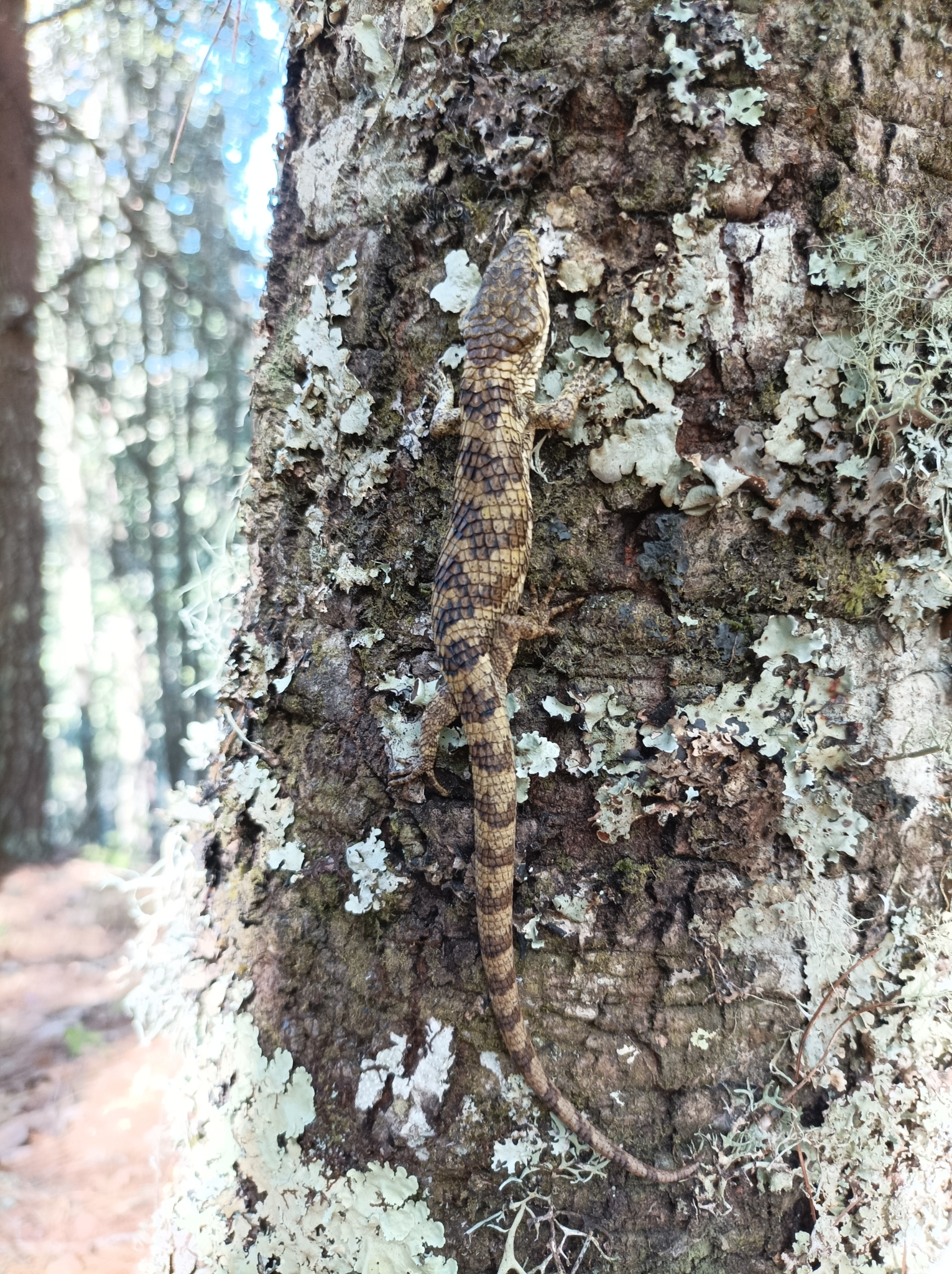
Climbing up a tree
