= Salvador arboreal alligator lizard =

Conservation status
- Endangered (IUCN 3.1)
- CITES Appendix II

Scientific classification
- Kingdom: Animalia
- Phylum: Chordata
- Class: Reptilia
- Order: Squamata
- Suborder: Anguimorpha
- Family: Anguidae
- Genus: Abronia
- Species: A. salvadorensis

Binomial name
- Abronia salvadorensis Hidalgo, 1998

Species of lizard

Salvador arboreal alligator lizard (Abronia salvadorensis) is a species of lizard found in two isolated locations in Honduras. One population in the department of La Paz and a smaller population in the department of Intibucá.
