= Abronia reidi =

Conservation status
- Data Deficient (IUCN 3.1)
- CITES Appendix II

Scientific classification
- Kingdom: Animalia
- Phylum: Chordata
- Class: Reptilia
- Order: Squamata
- Suborder: Anguimorpha
- Family: Anguidae
- Genus: Abronia
- Species: A. reidi

Binomial name
- Abronia reidi Werler & Shannon, 1961
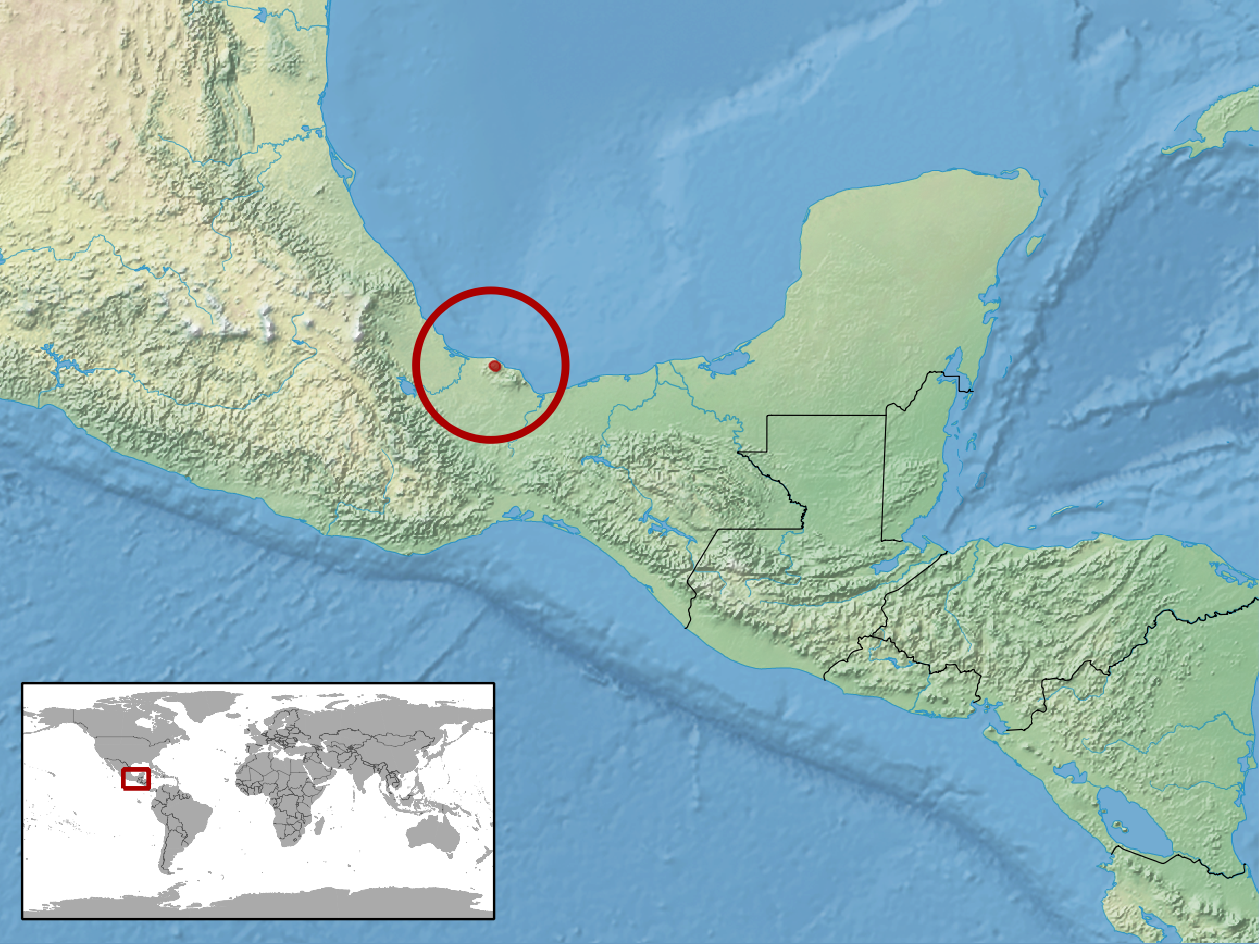

Synonyms
- Abronia reidi Werler & Shannon, 1961; Gerrhonotus reidi — Wermuth, 1969; Abronia (Abaculabronia) reidi — Campbell & Frost, 1993; Abronia reidi — Liner, 1994

Species of lizard

Abronia reidi, Reid's arboreal alligator lizard, is a species of arboreal alligator lizard in the family Anguidae. The species is native to Mexico. It was described as a species new to science in 1961 by John E. Werler and Frederick A. Shannon.

== Etymology ==
The specific name, reidi, is in honor of Jack Robert Reid (born 1933) of San Antonio, Texas, who was one of the collectors of the holotype.

== Geographic range ==
A. reidi is endemic to the Mexican state of Veracruz.

== Habitat ==
The natural habitat of A. reidi is forest.

== Reproduction ==
A. reidi is viviparous.
