= Abronia mitchelli =

Conservation status
- Data Deficient (IUCN 3.1)
- CITES Appendix II

Scientific classification
- Kingdom: Animalia
- Phylum: Chordata
- Class: Reptilia
- Order: Squamata
- Suborder: Anguimorpha
- Family: Anguidae
- Genus: Abronia
- Species: A. mitchelli

Binomial name
- Abronia mitchelli Campbell, 1982
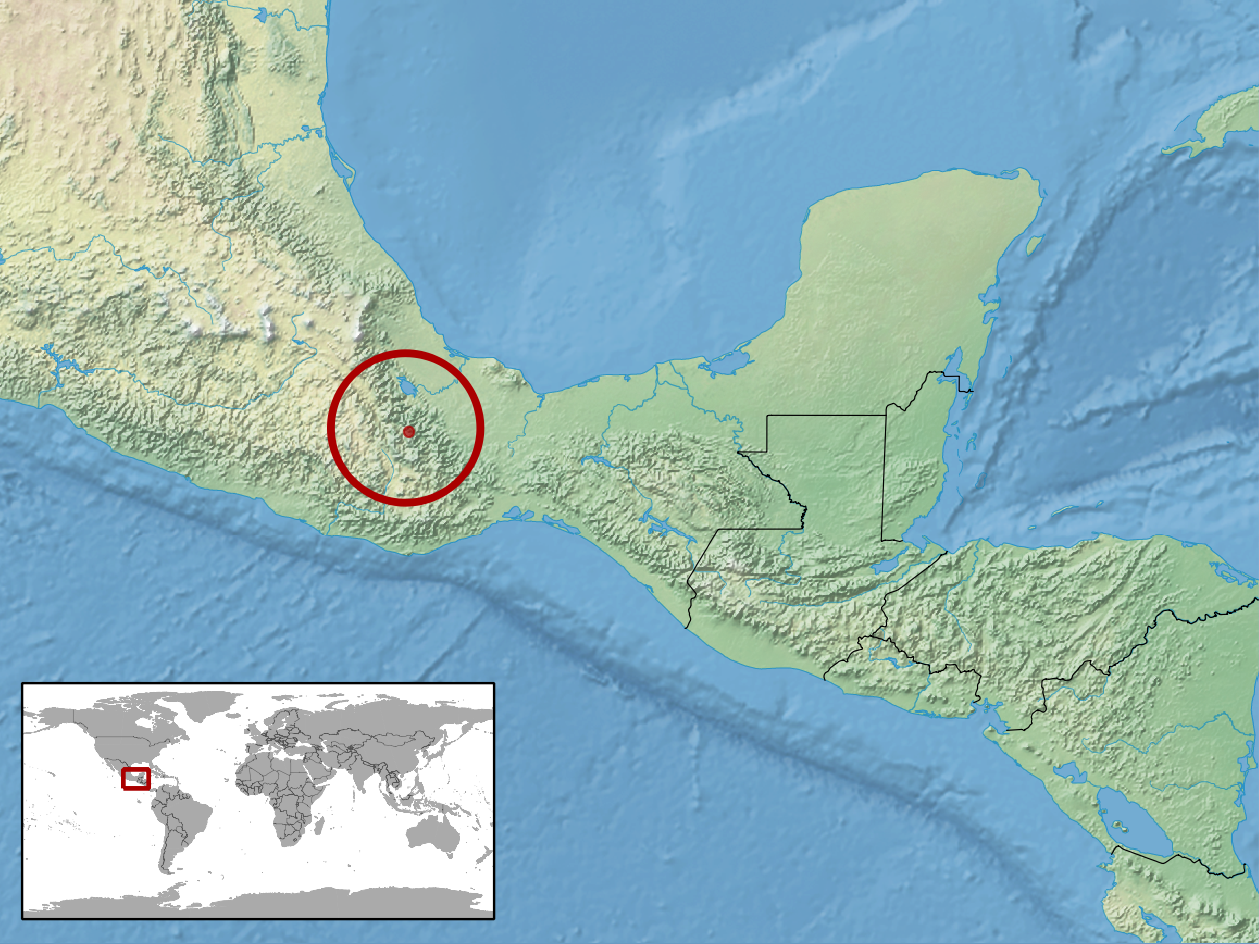

Species of lizard

Abronia mitchelli, also known commonly as Mitchell's arboreal alligator lizard and escorpión arborícola de Mitchell in Mexican Spanish, is a species of arboreal alligator lizard in the family Anguidae. The species, which was originally described in 1982 by Jonathan A. Campbell, is native to southwestern Mexico.

== Etymology ==
The specific name, mitchelli, is in honor of American herpetologist Lyndon A. Mitchell.

== Geographic range ==
Abronia mitchelli is found in the Mexican state of Oaxaca.

== Habitat ==
The natural habitat of Abronia mitchelli is cloud forest at an altitude of 2,750 m (9,020 ft).

== Reproduction ==
Abronia mitchelli is viviparous.
