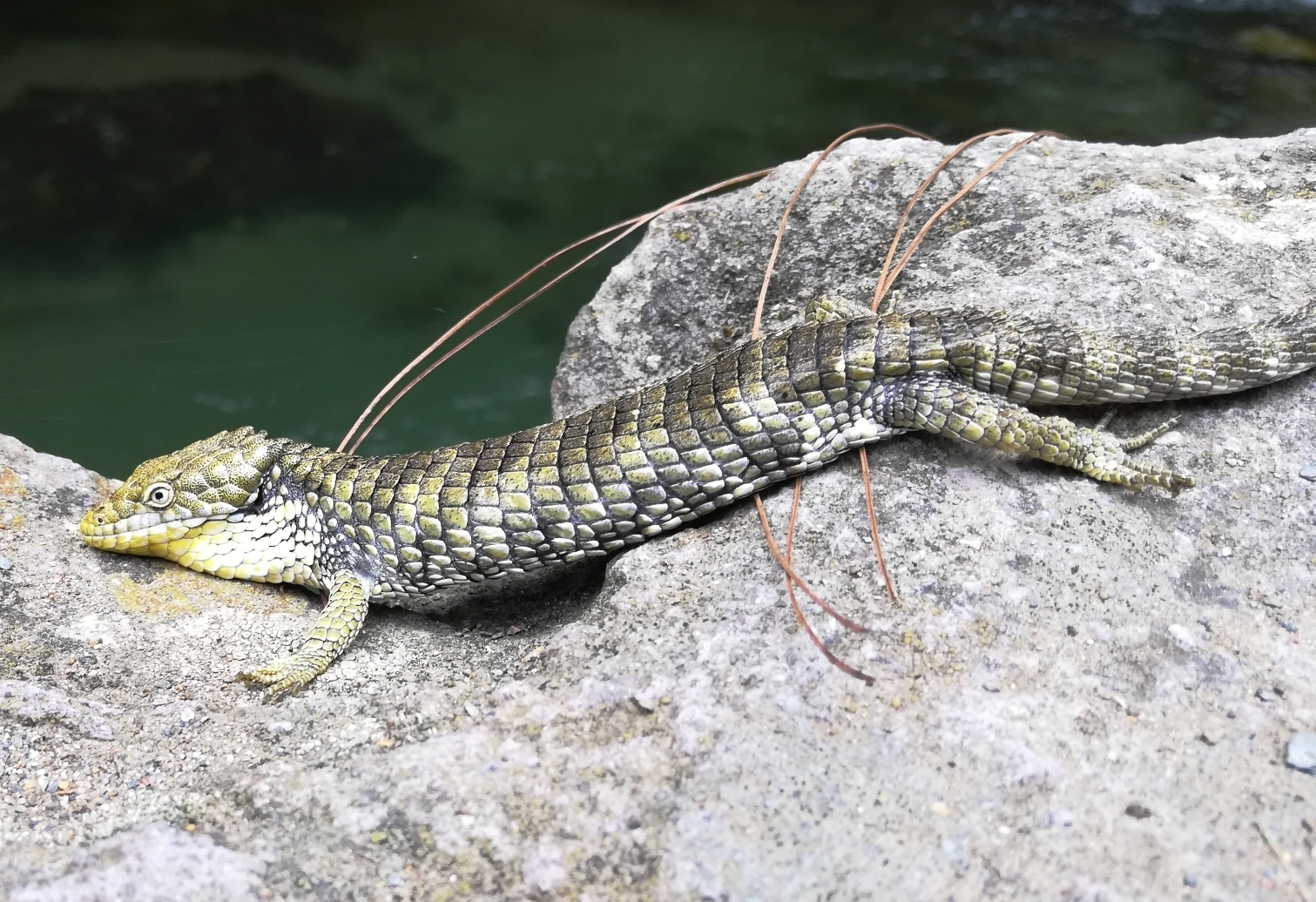

Conservation status
- Vulnerable (IUCN 3.1)
- CITES Appendix II

Scientific classification
- Kingdom: Animalia
- Phylum: Chordata
- Class: Reptilia
- Order: Squamata
- Suborder: Anguimorpha
- Family: Anguidae
- Genus: Abronia
- Species: A. oaxacae

Binomial name
- Abronia oaxacae (Günther, 1885)

Synonyms
- Gerrhonotus oaxacae Günther, 1885

= Abronia oaxacae =

Species of lizard

Abronia oaxacae, the Oaxacan arboreal alligator lizard, is a vulnerable species of arboreal alligator lizard described in 1885 by Albert C. L. G. Günther. It is endemic to Oaxaca, Mexico.

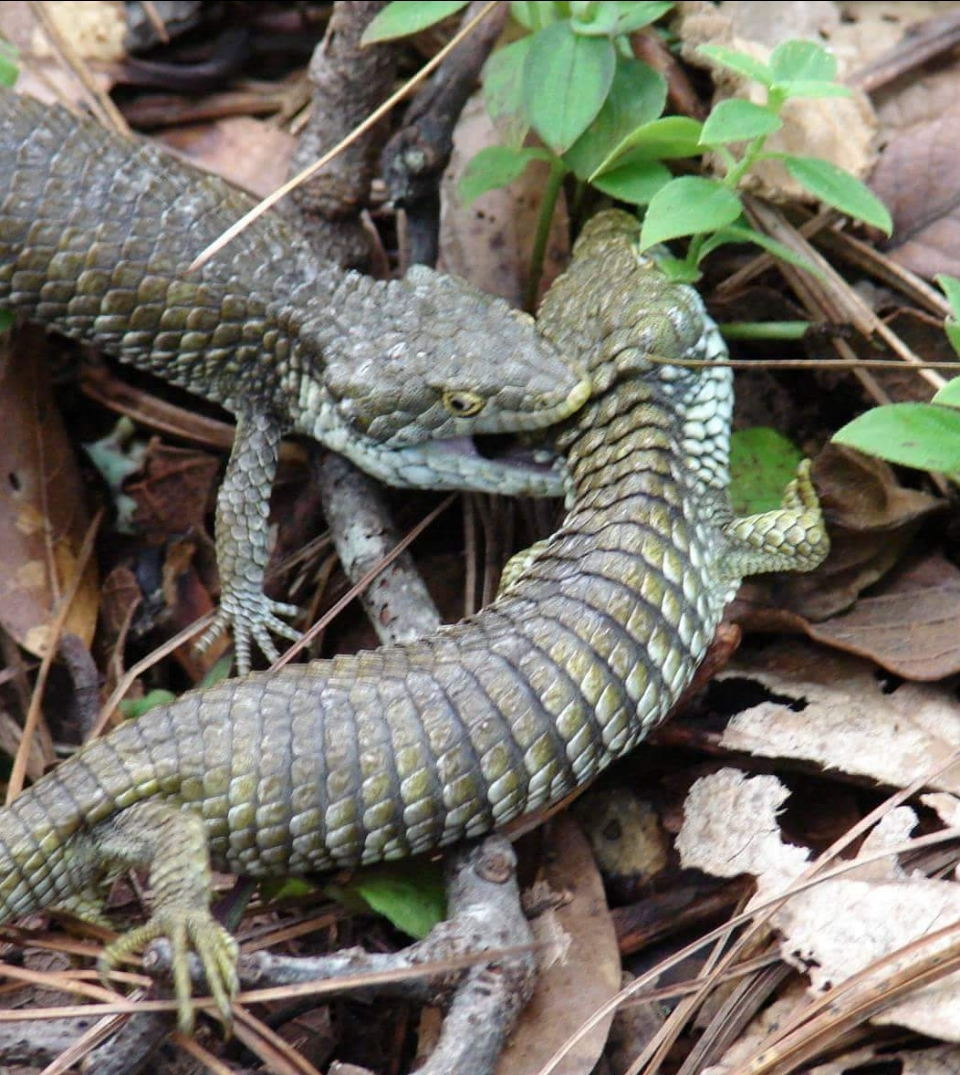
Fighting

== Distribution and habitat ==
Abronia oaxacae is found in the central Oaxaca state, Mexico. It has been recorded from elevations of 2,100 to 2,743 metres (6,890 to 8,999 ft).

It is an arboreal species found in primary pine-oak forest. It has been recorded from moderately disturbed areas.
