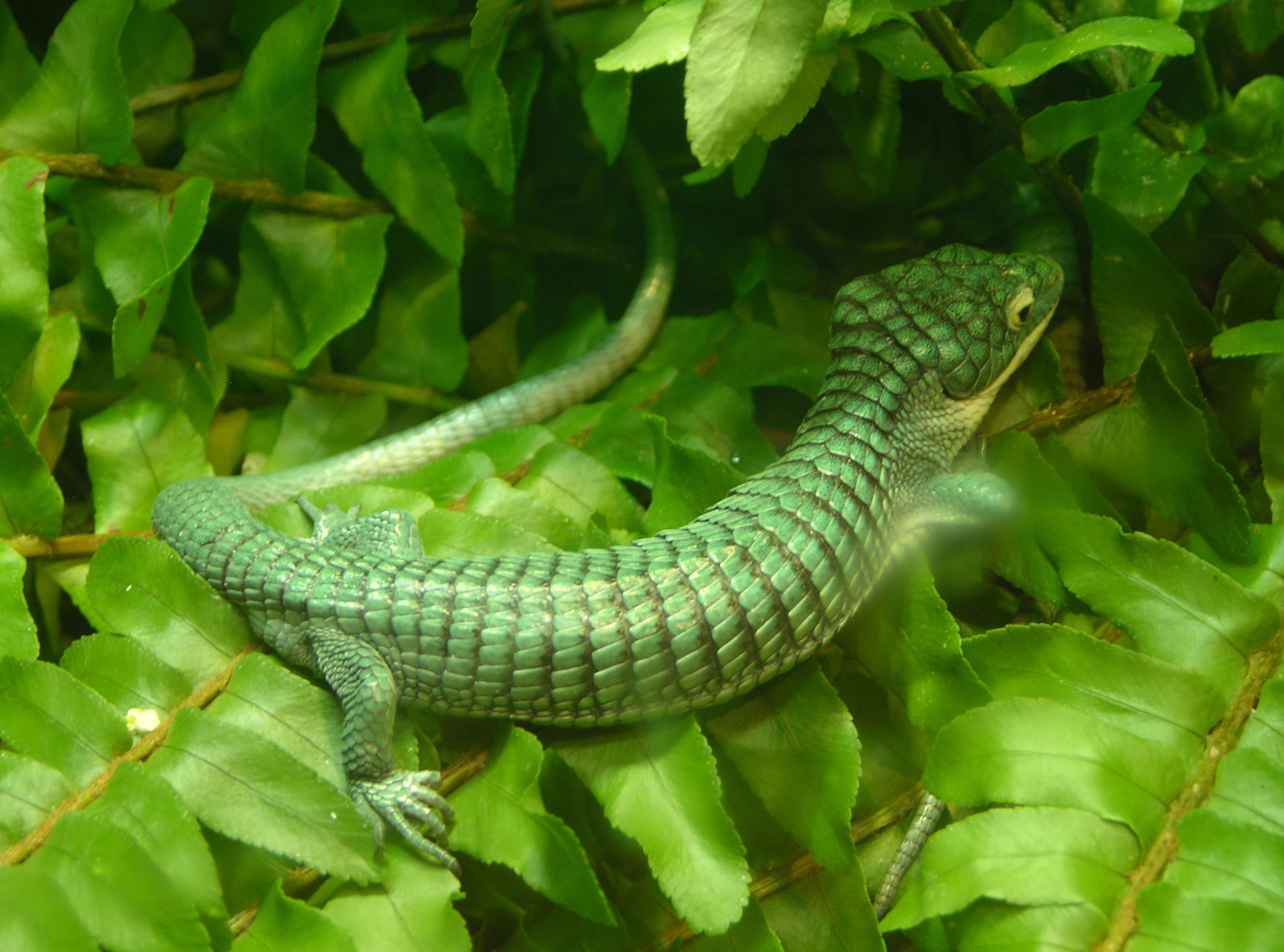
- Abronia graminea

Scientific classification
- Kingdom: Animalia
- Phylum: Chordata
- Class: Reptilia
- Order: Squamata
- Suborder: Anguimorpha
- Family: Anguidae
- Genus: Abronia; Gray, 1838

Synonyms
- Mesaspis

= Abronia (lizard) =

Genus of lizards, family of Anguidae

Abronia is a genus of lizards, known colloquially as alligator lizards, in the family Anguidae. The genus is native to Mexico and Central America. The majority of the species are restricted to southern Mexico and Guatemala, but members of the genus occur as far south as Panama. They inhabit forests and woodlands, mostly in highlands, and some species are often associated with bromeliads. They are typically arboreal, but there are also terrestrial Abronia species. Many species are considered threatened due to habitat loss, killing by locals who mistakenly believe they are venomous, or collection for the captive reptile trade (they are listed on CITES, which restricts international trade). They feed on small animal prey, such as insects, and the females give birth to live young (rather than lay eggs).

Abronia species are medium-sized to fairly large lizards, with a maximum snout-to-vent length (SVL) up to 35 cm (14 in). They possess intriguing physical traits such as a long prehensile tail that can be regrown if lost, keeled body scales, and a helmet-like structure on the top of the head, which in some species, for example A. lythrochila, has spikes towards the rear. Their colors vary significantly depending on species, including green, bluish-green, brown, yellowish, whitish, gray and black, and some have contrasting mottled or banded patterns.

== Species ==
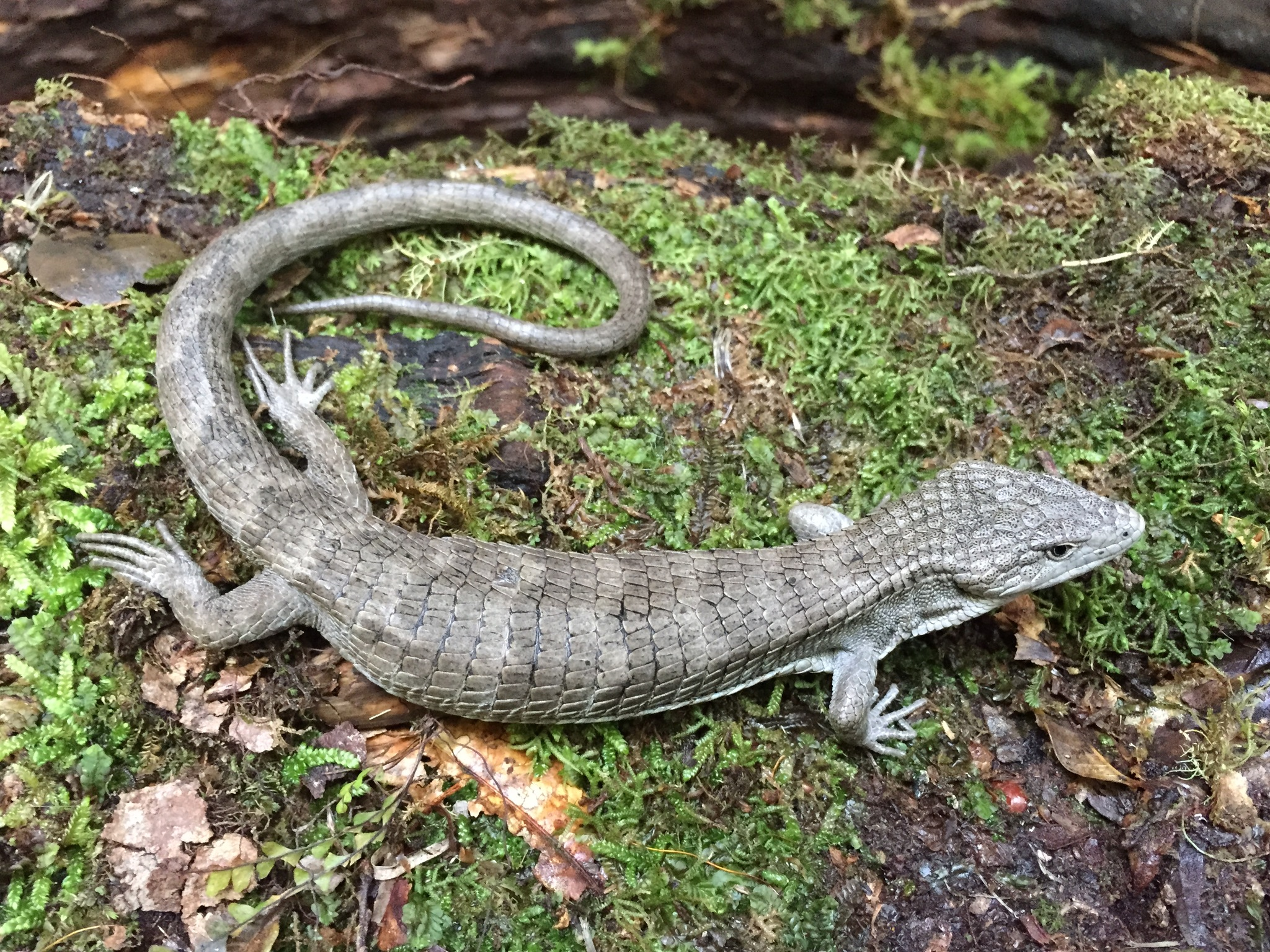
Abronia montecristoi

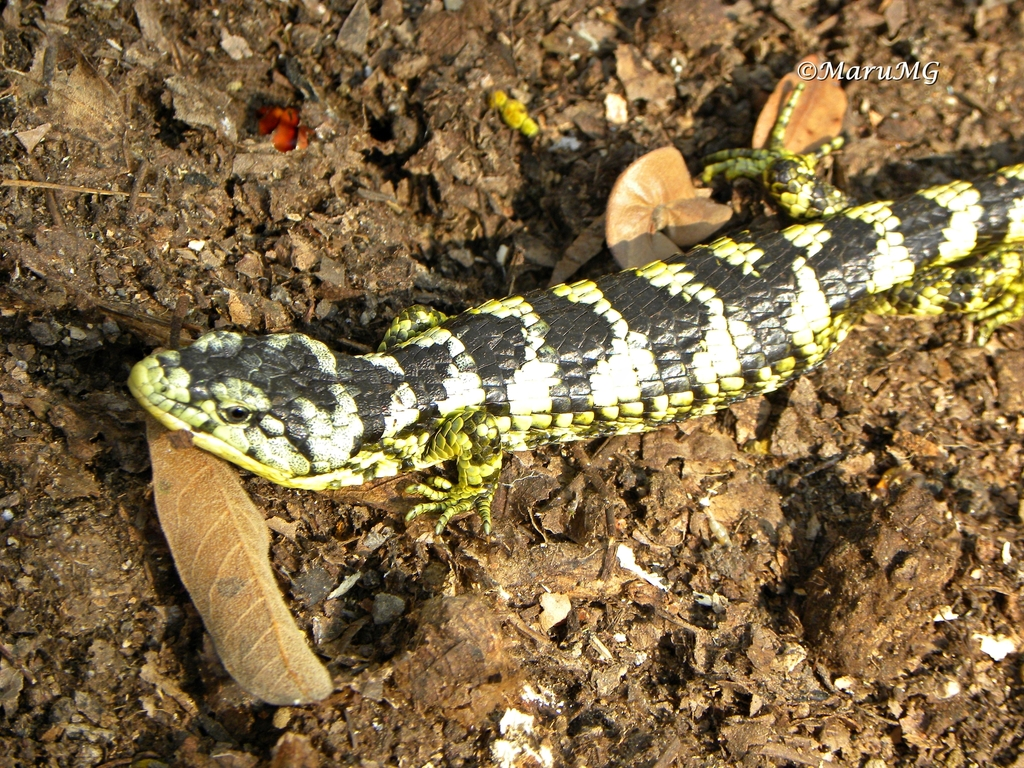
Abronia taeniata

These species are recognized as being valid:

- Abronia antauges (Cope, 1866) – Mount Orizaba alligator lizard
- Abronia anzuetoi Campbell & Frost, 1993 – Anzueto's arboreal alligator lizard
- Abronia aurita (Cope, 1869) – Cope's arboreal alligator lizard
- Abronia bogerti Tihen, 1954 – Bogert's arboreal alligator lizard
- Abronia campbelli Brodie & Savage, 1993 – Campbell's alligator lizard
- Abronia chiszari H.M. Smith & R.B. Smith, 1981 – Chiszar's arboreal alligator lizard
- Abronia cuchumatanus Solano-Zavaleta, Nieto-Montes de Oca & Campbell, 2016 – Cuchumatanes alligator lizard
- Abronia cuetzpali Campbell, Solano-Zavaleta, Flores-Villela, Caviedes-Solís & Frost, 2016
- Abronia cunemica (Clause et al., 2024) – Coapilla arboreal alligator lizard.
- Abronia deppii (Wiegmann, 1828) – Deppe's arboreal alligator lizard
- Abronia fimbriata (Cope, 1884)
- Abronia frosti Campbell, Sasa, Acevedo & Mendelson, 1998 – Frost's arboreal alligator lizard
- Abronia fuscolabialis (Tihen, 1944) – Mount Zempoaltepec arboreal alligator lizard
- Abronia gadovii (Boulenger, 1913) – Gadow's alligator lizard
- Abronia gaiophantasma Campbell & Frost, 1993 – brilliant arboreal alligator lizard
- Abronia graminea (Cope, 1864) – Mexican alligator lizard
- Abronia juarezi (Karges & J.W. Wright, 1987) – Sierra Juarez alligator lizard
- Abronia leurolepis Campbell & Frost, 1993 – smoothback arboreal alligator lizard
- Abronia lythrochila H.M. Smith & Álvarez del Toro, 1963 – red-lipped arboreal alligator lizard
- Abronia martindelcampoi Flores-Villela & Sánchez-Herrera, 2003 – Martín del Campo's arboreal alligator lizard
- Abronia matudai (Hartweg & Tihen, 1946) – Matuda's arboreal alligator lizard
- Abronia meledona Campbell & Brodie, 1999
- Abronia mitchelli Campbell, 1982 – Mitchell's arboreal alligator lizard
- Abronia mixteca Bogert & Porter, 1967 – Mixtecan arboreal alligator lizard
- Abronia montecristoi Hidalgo, 1983 – Monte Cristo arboreal alligator lizard
- Abronia monticola (Cope, 1878) – montane alligator lizard
- Abronia moreletii (Bocourt, 1871) – Morelet's alligator lizard
- Abronia morenica Clause, Luna-Reyes & Nieto-Montes de Oca, 2020 – Sierra Morena arboreal alligator lizard
- Abronia oaxacae (Günther, 1885) – Oaxacan arboreal alligator lizard
- Abronia ochoterenai (Martín del Campo, 1939) – Ochoterena's arboreal alligator lizard, Northern Chiapas arboreal alligator lizard,
- Abronia ornelasi Campbell, 1984 – Ornelas's arboreal alligator lizard, Cerro Baul alligator lizard
- Abronia ramirezi Campbell, 1994 – Ramirez's alligator lizard
- Abronia reidi Werler & Shannon, 1961 – Reid's arboreal alligator lizard
- Abronia salvadorensis Hidalgo, 1983 – Salvador arboreal alligator lizard
- Abronia smithi Campbell & Frost, 1993 – Smith's arboreal alligator lizard
- Abronia taeniata (Wiegmann, 1828) – banded arboreal alligator lizard, bromeliad arboreal alligator lizard
- Abronia vasconcelosii (Bocourt, 1871) – Bocourt's arboreal alligator lizard
- Abronia viridiflava (Bocourt, 1873) – dwarf alligator lizard
- Abronia zongolica García-Vázquez, Clause, Gutiérrez-Rodríguez, Cazares-Hernández & de la Torre-Loranca, 2022
