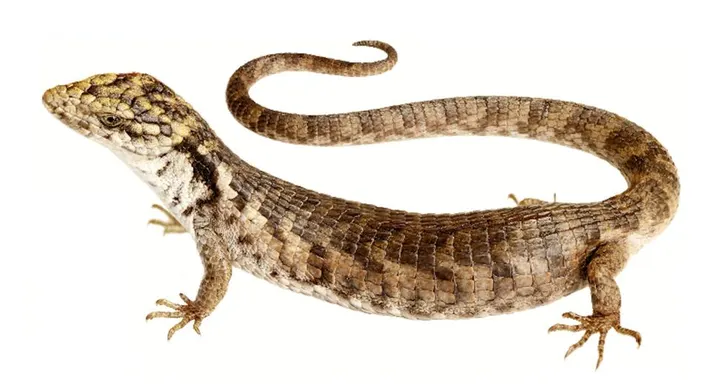

Scientific classification
- Kingdom: Animalia
- Phylum: Chordata
- Class: Reptilia
- Order: Squamata
- Suborder: Anguimorpha
- Family: Anguidae
- Genus: Abronia
- Species: A. cunemica

Binomial name
- Abronia cunemica Clause et al., 2024

= Abronia cunemica =

Species of lizard

Abronia cunemica, also known commonly as the Coapilla arboreal alligator lizard and el dragoncito de Coapilla in Mexican Spanish, is a species of lizard in the family Anguidae. The species, which was described in 2024 by Adam Clause et al., is native to southern Mexico.

== Geographic range ==
Abronia cunemica is endemic to the Mexican state of Chiapas. The type locality is "vicinity of Coapilla, Municipio de Coapilla, Northern Highlands, Chiapas, Mexico".

== Ecology and behaviour ==
Abronia cunemica is an elusive tree-dweller, feeding mainly on insects. It is rarely seen due to its limited distribution and ambiguous behaviour.

It can reach a length of up to 9.8 in (250 mm) and is characterized by its yellow-brown scaly body with darker brown blotches.
