= Abronia leurolepis =

Conservation status
- Data Deficient (IUCN 3.1)
- CITES Appendix II

Scientific classification
- Kingdom: Animalia
- Phylum: Chordata
- Class: Reptilia
- Order: Squamata
- Suborder: Anguimorpha
- Family: Anguidae
- Genus: Abronia
- Species: A. leurolepis

Binomial name
- Abronia leurolepis Campbell & Frost, 1993
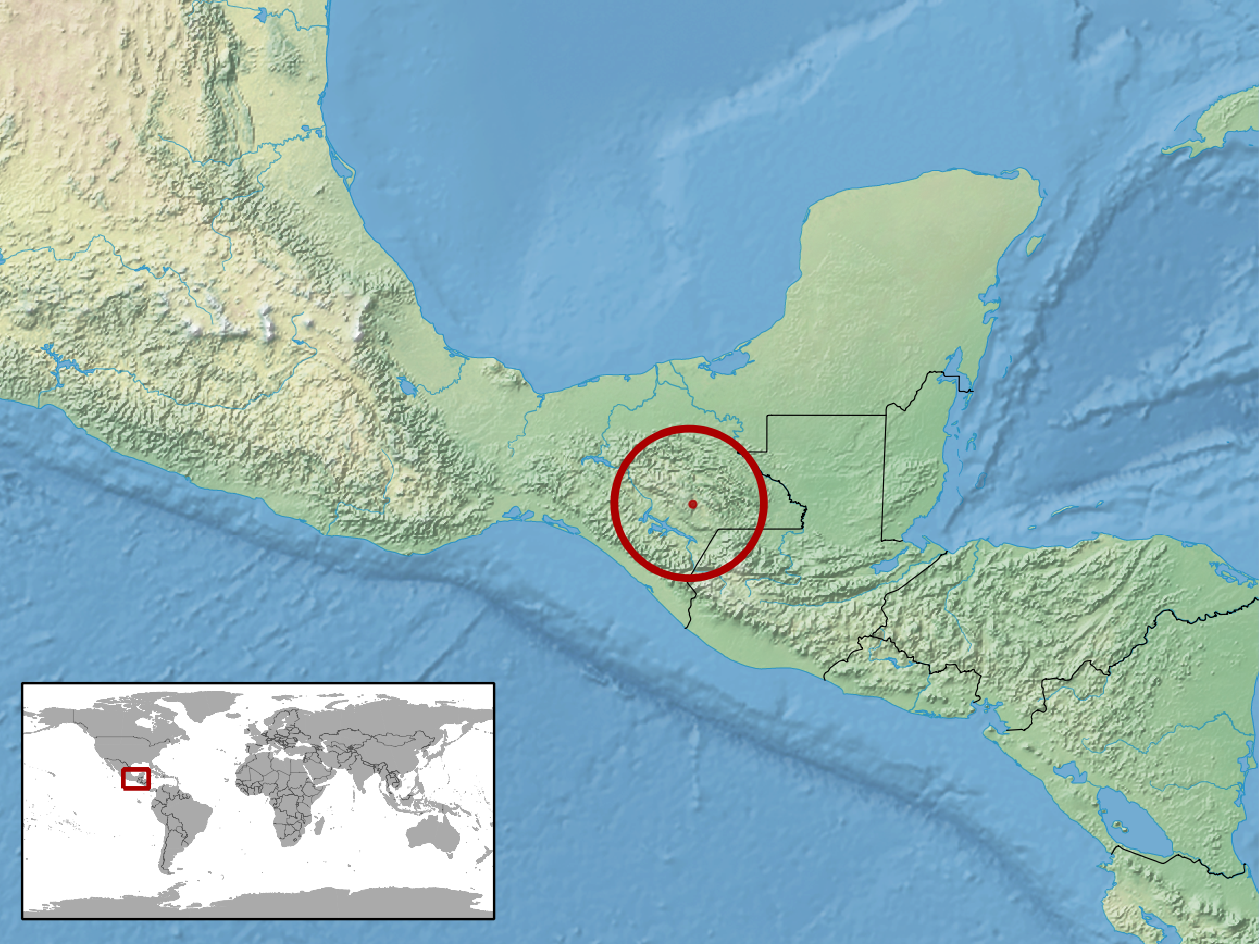

Species of lizard

Abronia leurolepis is an arboreal alligator lizard that is endemic to Mexico. Its common name is smoothback arboreal alligator lizard.
