= Isaac Ochoterena =

Mexican botanist

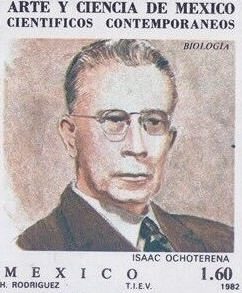
- Spouse: Carmen Sarabia Castillón
- Awards: honorary doctorate, National Autonomous University of Mexico (1940)

Academic work
- Discipline: biology
- Sub-discipline: botany and histology
- Institutions: Universidad Nacional Autónoma de México; Dirección de Estudios Biológicos

Jacobo Isaac Ochoterena Mendieta (Note: In this Spanish name, the first or paternal surname is Ochoterena and the second or maternal family name is Mendieta.) (1885–1950) was a Mexican autodidact, biologist, botanist, plant collector, researcher, educator and academic who published over 230 scientific works. Initially a primary school teacher, he went on to become a professor at the Universidad Nacional Autónoma de México (National Autonomous University of México, UNAM), a researcher at the government-funded research center Dirección de Estudios Biológicos (DEB), and Dean of the Biology Institute at UNAM.

Ochoterena documented the diverse botany and zoology of Mexico, publishing both books and papers on a wide range of topics. A genus and at least 15 species have been named for Ochoterena, among them flowering plants, cacti, fish, skinks and lizards. He helped to identify the cause of the disease onchocerciasis, which has since been eradicated through public health initiatives.

Ochoterena, with Fernando Ocaranza and Eliseo Ramírez Ulloa, was part of a new order of politically aligned medical institutions that developed in post revolutionary Mexico. As Dean of Biology, Ochoterena's descriptive and practical approach to biology and his emphasis on its applications in medicine shaped the institutionalization of biology in Mexico. This may have been one of the factors delaying the development in Mexico of a broad-based approach to biological concepts and the examination of theories such as evolution and the origin of life.

== Early life and education ==
Isaac Ochoterena was born in Atlixco, Puebla, to Colonel Pedro Ochoterena and Virginia Mendieta de Ochoterena. He attended school in his native city and at the Escuela Normal of Tlaxcala (Tlaxcala Normal School) and later the Escuela Nacional Preparatoria (National Preparatory School) in Mexico City where his teachers included Gabino Barreda, Justo Sierra Méndez, Miguel E. Schulz and naturalist Manuel Maria Villada.

When Ochoterena was 16 his father died, and he gave up his initial plan of studying medicine. Ochoterena published his first article, "Algo de Paleontologia" in 1903. On the advice of Justo Sierra, Ochoterena applied for and passed an examination given by the Secretaría de Instrucción Pública y Bellas Artes qualifying him as a teacher of primary education in 1906. Beyond this early training, he was an autodidact, entirely self-taught.

== Career ==
Ochoterena began his teaching career in Tlatlauquitepec in the state of Puebla. In 1905 he published Flora de la Sierra de Puebla, and in 1909 Influencia del fósforo en la germinación, based on his botanical explorations.

In 1907, Pastor Rouaix invited Ochoterena to move to Gómez Palacio, Durango, to teach primary school. Ochoterena was later appointed as a school director in Lerdo, Durango, and as a school inspector for the state of Durango, holding the position of Inspector of Public Instruction until 1913. He also became a professor of biology and botany in the Instituto Juárez in the capital of Durango, teaching classes in natural history and chemistry. In 1912 Ochoterena married Carmen Sarabia Castillón, sister of aviator Francisco Sarabia Tinoco. In 1914 Ochoterena became Director General of Education for the state of San Luis Potosí.

The Escuela Nacional de Agricultura y Veterinaria (National School of Agronomy and Veterinary Medicine, ENAV) was the first veterinary school to be created on the American continent. It was established by President Antonio López de Santa Anna on August 17, 1853. In 1915 Ochoterena began teaching histology classes there.

Also in 1915, naturalist Alfonso Luis Herrera became the director of the Museo de Historia Natural (National Museum of Natural History, MHN) in Mexico City. Herrera proposed the formation of a biological research center, the Dirección de Estudios Biológicos (Directorate of Biological Studies, DEB), under the Ministry of Agriculture and Development. The DEB became another key institution, with Herrera at its head. From 1916 to 1918, Ochoterena worked with the DEB, in charge of the Vegetable Biology Section. He was exposed to Herrera's ideas about biological evolution during this time, but later opposed them.

In 1917, Ochoterena was invited to teach at the Escuela Médico Militar (Military Medical School) by Eliseo Ramírez Ulloa. Ochoterena taught courses in histology and embryology. Ochoterena and Ramírez also worked with Fernando Ocaranza Carmona to form the Sociedad Mexicana de Biología (Mexican Biology Society) in 1920. They published their own journal, Revista Mexicana de Biología (Mexican Journal of Biology) from 1920 to 1935. By 1921 Ochoterena was head of the Biology Department at the school he had once attended, the Escuela Nacional Preparatoria (National Preparatory School), and curator of its natural history collections.

One of Ochoterena's students was Helia Bravo Hollis. She assisted him in writing the first book on cacti in Mexico, Las Cactaceas de Mexico (1922). His students also included Eduardo Caballero y Caballero, and José de Lille. In 1925, Ochoterena replaced Herrera as teacher of zoology after a reorganization of faculty at the national university. From this time, he became increasingly involved in the activities of the university council.

In the field of histology, Ochoterena made important discoveries relating to the disease Onchocerciasis, identifying the parasite which causes it, Onchocerca volvulus. In 1928 he showed that microfilaria were present in the eye and optic nerve, and in 1930, he identified Simulium ochraceum as the disease's main vector in the Americas. These discoveries laid the basis for public health initiatives and the eventual eradication of the disease.

In 1929, a major political and educational reorganization occurred, with control of departments shifting from the government to the Universidad Nacional Autonoma de México (National Autonomous University of Mexico, UNAM). The Directorate of Biological Studies became part of UNAM. On October 16, 1929, Fernando Ocaranza proposed Ochoterena as a candidate for director of the Biological Institute, where he replaced Herrera. Ochoterena also became head of the National Museum of Natural History in Mexico City, which was part of the Biological Institute.

During the same reorganization, the National School of Agronomy and Veterinary Medicine became the National School of Veterinary Medicine and Animal Production (Medicina Veterinaria y Zootecnia) of UNAM.) The faculty at UNAM was the only veterinary school serving Mexico and other Latin American countries until 1957.

After taking charge of UNAM's newly created Institute of Biology, Ochoterena offered Bravo Hollis the leadership of the National Herbarium, where she specialized in the Cactaceae family. Ochoterena continued to teach at the National Preparatory School. In 1939, when UNAM's Faculty of Sciences was founded, he became head of the Departamento de Biología of the Facultad de Ciencias at UNAM. From 1941 to 1943, Ochoterena held the government appointment of General Director of Educación Superior e Investigación Científica (Higher Education and Scientific Research). The National Autonomous University of Mexico awarded him an honorary doctorate in 1940. In 1946 he was named researcher emeritus and honorary director of the Institute of Biology of UNAM.

As of May 15, 1943, Ochoterena became a founding member of Mexico's National College, along with others including José Clemente Orozco, Diego Rivera, Ignacio Chávez Sánchez, Antonio Caso Andrade, Alfonso Reyes, Carlos Chávez, Manuel Uribe Troncoso, Manuel Sandoval Vallarta, and José Vasconcelos.

== Awards and honors ==
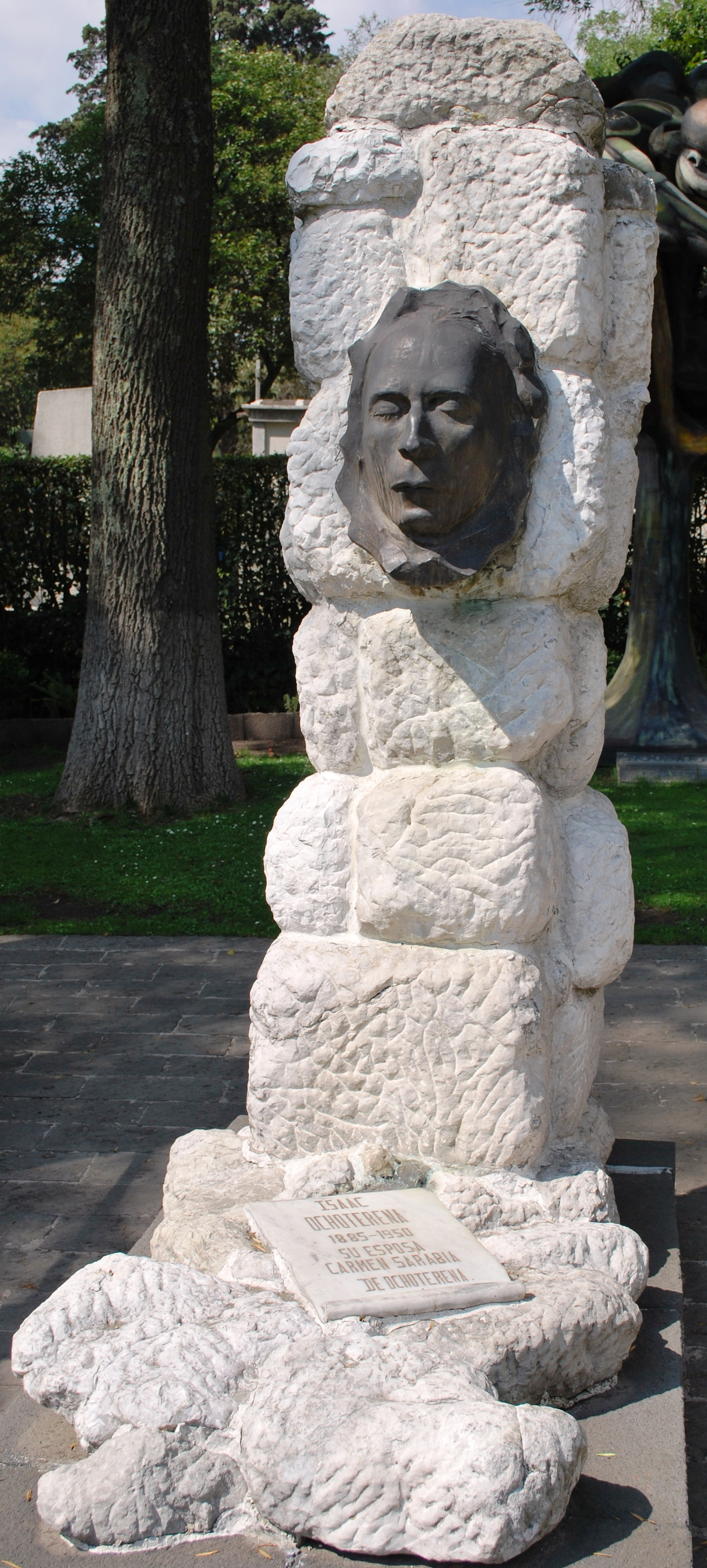
Tomb of Isaac Ochoterena, Panteón de Dolores

Ochoterena held various honors and was a member of numerous scholarly societies:

- 1929/1930, Academia Nacional de Ciencias Antonio Alzate, Mexico's National Academy of Sciences
- 1946, researcher emeritus and honorary director, Institute of Biology, UNAM
- Sociedad Mexicana de Geografía y Estadística (Mexican Society for Geography and Statistics)
- Member, National Academy of Medicine of Mexico
- Honorary Member, Sociedad Botánica de México (Botanical Society of Mexico, SBM)
- Hon. President, Sociedad Mexicana de Zoología
- Corresponding Member, Sociedad de Biología de Concepción, Chile
- Corresponding Foreign Member, Academia Nacional de Medicina de Lima (Peru)
- Corresponding Member, Academia Chilena de Ciencias Naturales
- Corresponding Member, Centro de Sciencias, Letras e Artes de Campinas, Sao Paulo, Brazil
- Corresponding Member, Societas Scientiarum Naturalium Caldas of Medellin, Colombia
- Corresponding Member, Sociedad Internacional de Investigaciones Cientificas of Bolivia
- Honorary Member, Société mycologique de France
- Honorary Member, Physikalisch-Medizinische Gesellschaft of Würzburg
- Honorary Member, Sociedad de Botánica Aplicada de la URSS (Institute of Applied Botany and New Cultures of the Union of Soviet Socialist Republics of Leningrad)
- Honorary Member, Société Nationale d'Acclimatation de France
- Honorary Member, Academia de Ciencias Exactas, Fisicas y Naturales of Madrid

== Legacy ==
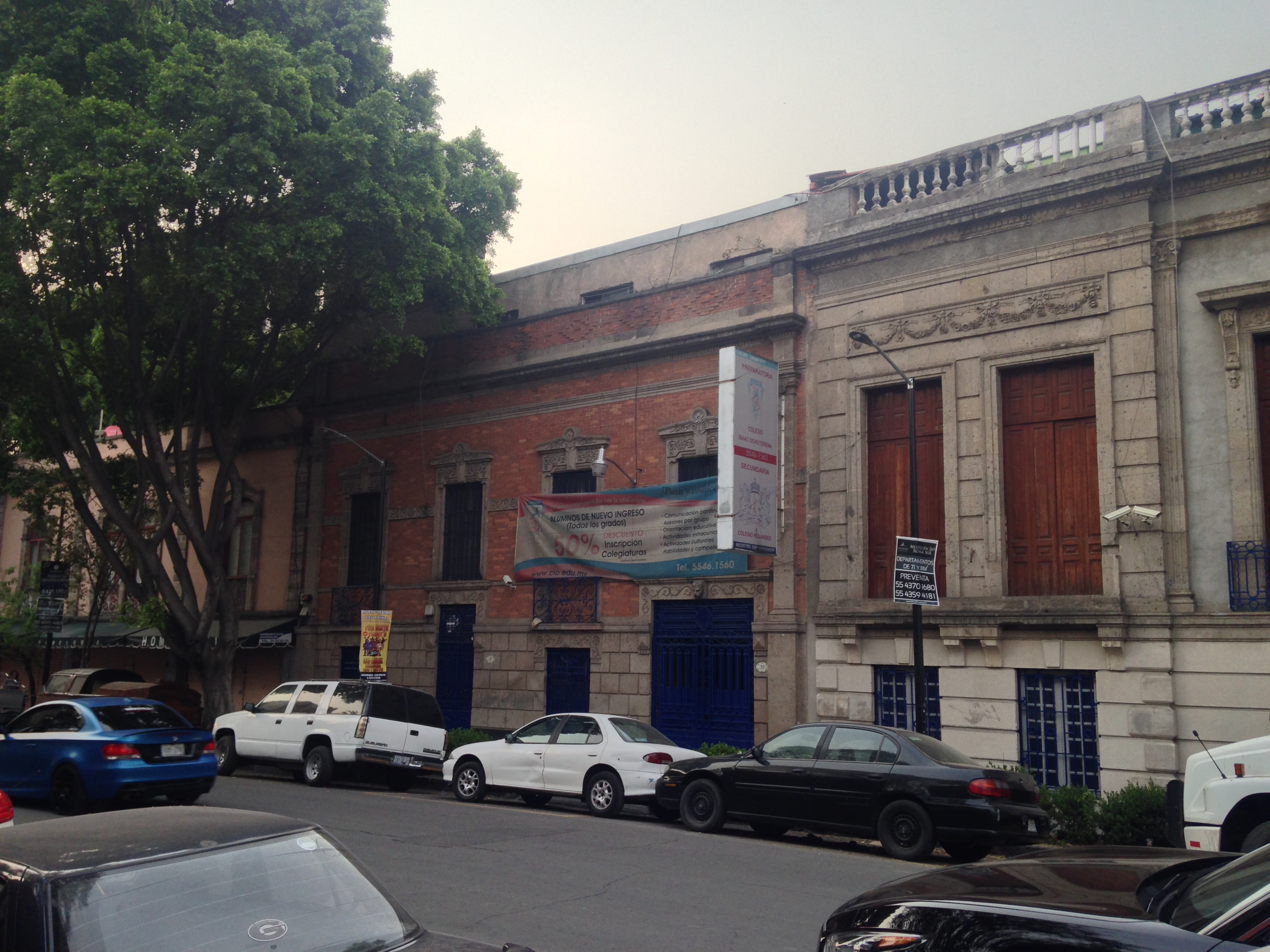
Front of the Colegio Isaac Ochoterena, Mexico City

In 1938, the Colegio Isaac Ochoterena secondary school was founded in honor of the scientist. The school was later one of the primary sites of student unrest and confrontations in July 1968 as part of a conflict between multiple vocational schools in Mexico City and the private secondary school. These conflicts are considered to have constituted the beginning of the anti-government protest Movement of 1968 in Mexico in the city, culminating in the October 1968 protest at the Three Cultures Plaza in Tlatelolco, in which over 30 students were killed.

== Eponymous species ==
At least 15 species have been named after Isaac Ochoterena in addition to the genus Ochoterenaea in the family Anacardiaceae.

- Abronia ochoterenai (arboreal alligator lizard)
- Hydroides ochotereana (worm)
- Ictalurus ochoterenai (Chapala catfish)
- Ochoterenaea colombiana, the only species in the monotypic genus of flowering plants Ochoterenaea
- Plestiodon ochoterenae (Guerreran skink)
- Sceloporus ochoterenae (Queretaran spiny lizard)
- Stenocactus ochoterenianus (cactus)

== Archives ==
- Harvard Library, Center for the History of Medicine (Francis A. Countway Library of Medicine) Richard P. Strong papers Office Files: Series 2, Nat D - O Ochoterena, Isaac, Dr, 1931-1932

== Selected publications ==
- Cactáceas de México, 1922
- Lecciones de biologia, por Isaac Ochoterena, 1922/1923
- Nota acerca de la presencia de fibras aferentes en el ganglio de Corti y en otros exteroceptores, 1926
- Tratado elemental de histologia general, 1938
- Tratado elemental de biología, 1942
- Lecciones acerca del órgano del oído, sustentadas en el Colegio nacional, 1943
