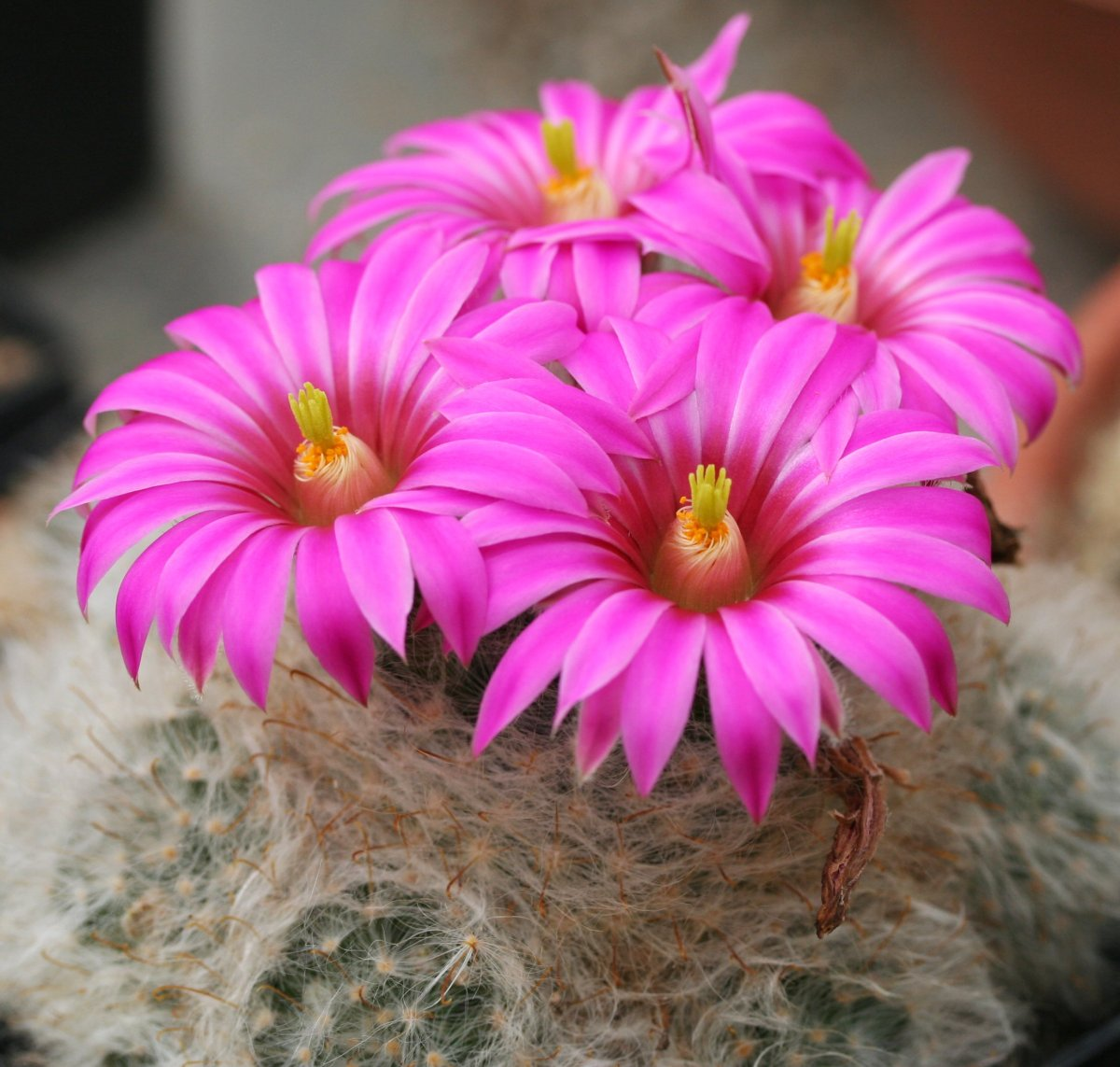

Conservation status
- Least Concern (IUCN 3.1)

Scientific classification
- Kingdom: Plantae
- Clade: Tracheophytes
- Clade: Angiosperms
- Clade: Eudicots
- Order: Caryophyllales
- Family: Cactaceae
- Subfamily: Cactoideae
- Genus: Cochemiea
- Species: C. guelzowiana

Binomial name
- Cochemiea guelzowiana (Werderm.) P.B.Breslin & Majure

Synonyms
- Bartschella guelzowiana (Werderm.) Doweld 2000; Krainzia guelzowiana (Werderm.) Backeb. 1951; Mammillaria guelzowiana Werderm. 1928; Phellosperma guelzowiana (Werderm.) Buxb. 1951; Krainzia guelzowiana var. comocephala Y.Itô 1981; Mammillaria guelzowiana var. robustior R.Wolf 1986

= Cochemiea guelzowiana =

Species of cactus

Cochemiea guelzowiana is a species of plant belonging to the family Cactaceae.

== Description ==
Cochemiea guelzowiana is a perennial plant that grows fleshy, globose, at first solitary and then forming groups. The stems have a spherical, apically depressed, about 7 inches tall and 4-10 inches in diameter. Tubercules are conical and cylindrical. They do not contain latex. The plant has 1-6 thin central spines, needle shaped, yellowish red, 8 to 25 millimeters long. The 60-80 radial spines are long and twisted, about 15 mm long. The bell-shaped flowers are purple, more or less bright, up to 4 inches long and can reach 7 inches in diameter. The fruits are almost spherical, bright red or yellowish white, about 8 mm in length.

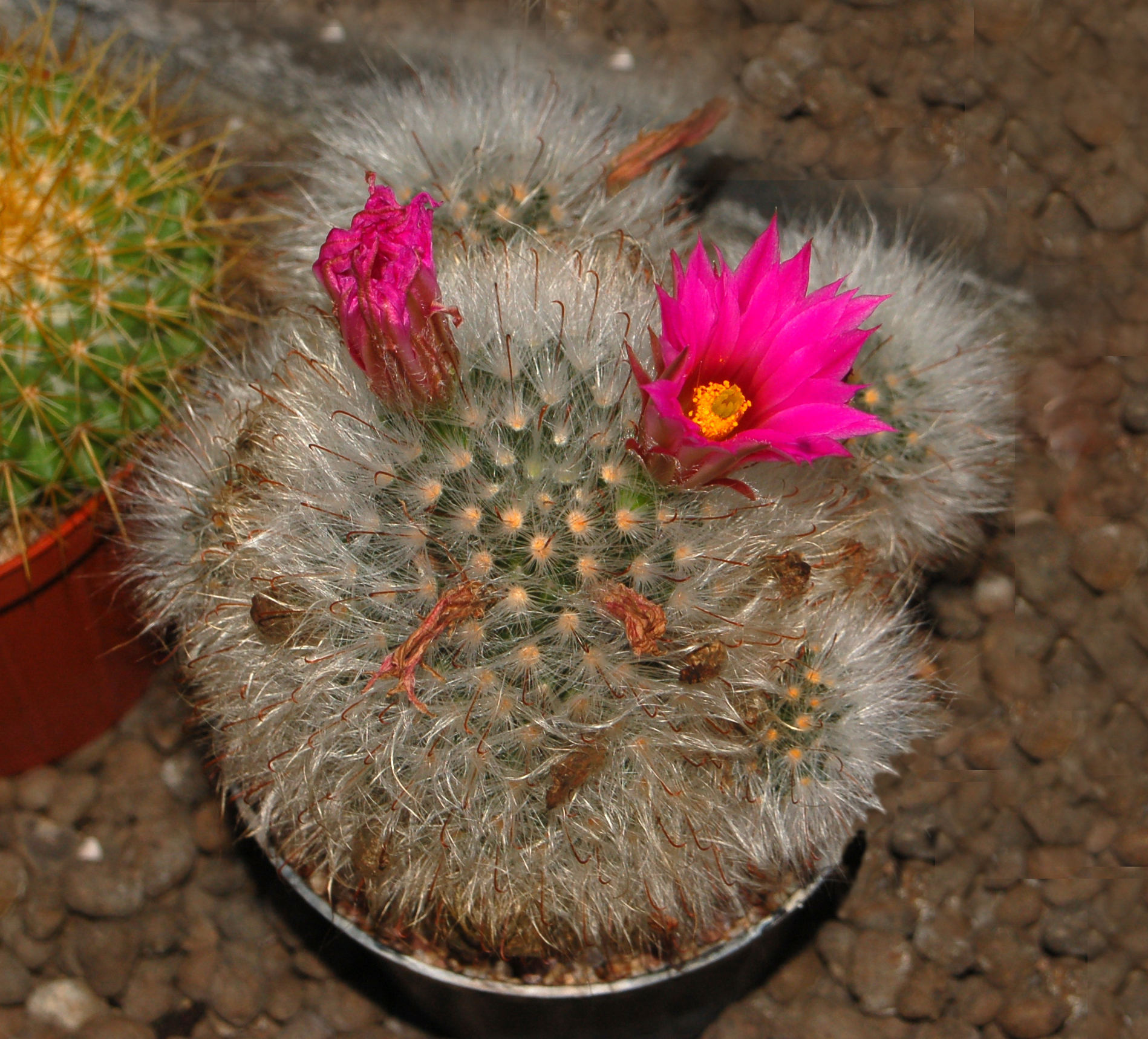
Cochemiea guelzowiana at the Orto Botanico dell'Università di Genova

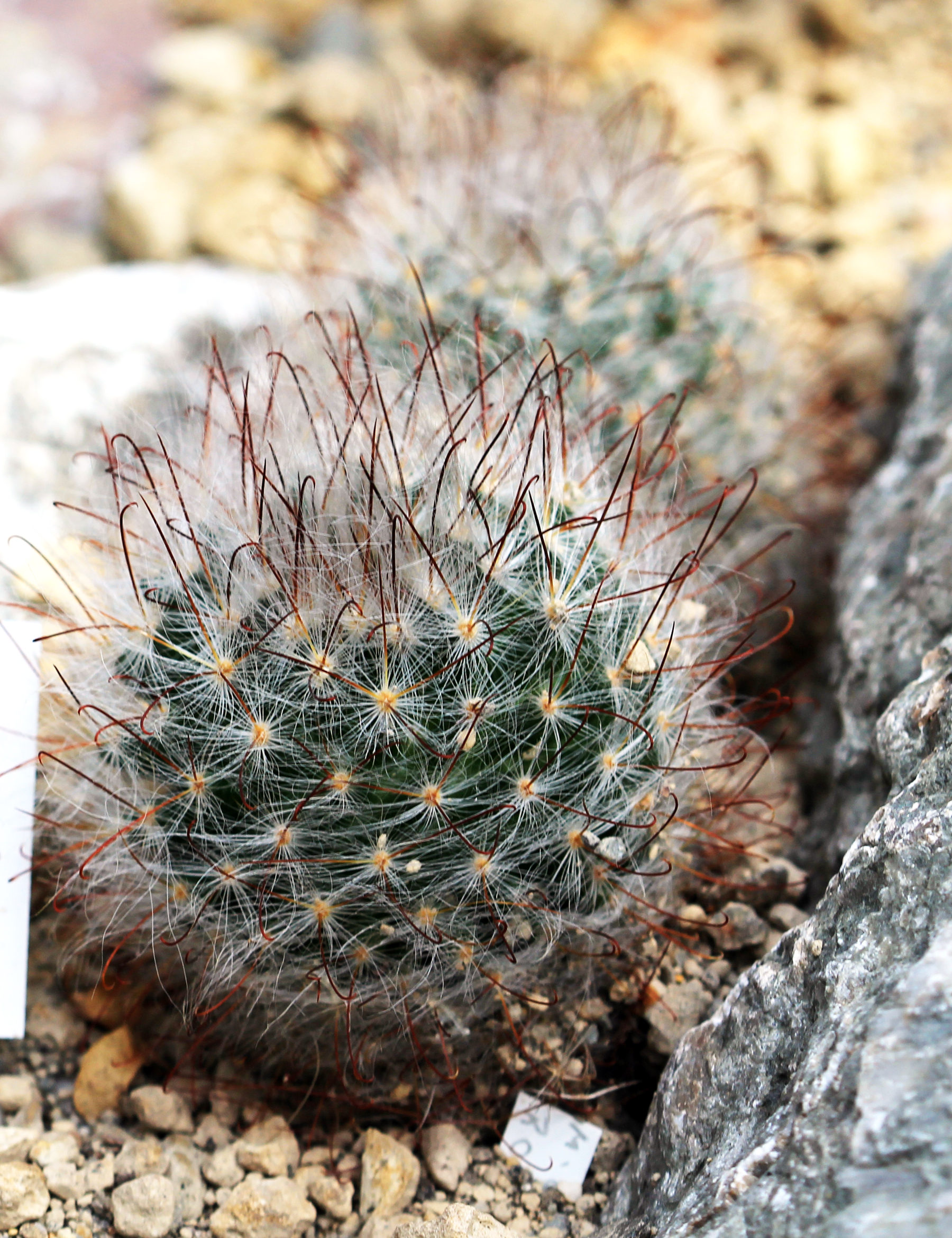
Cochemiea guelzowiana at the Prague Botanic Garden

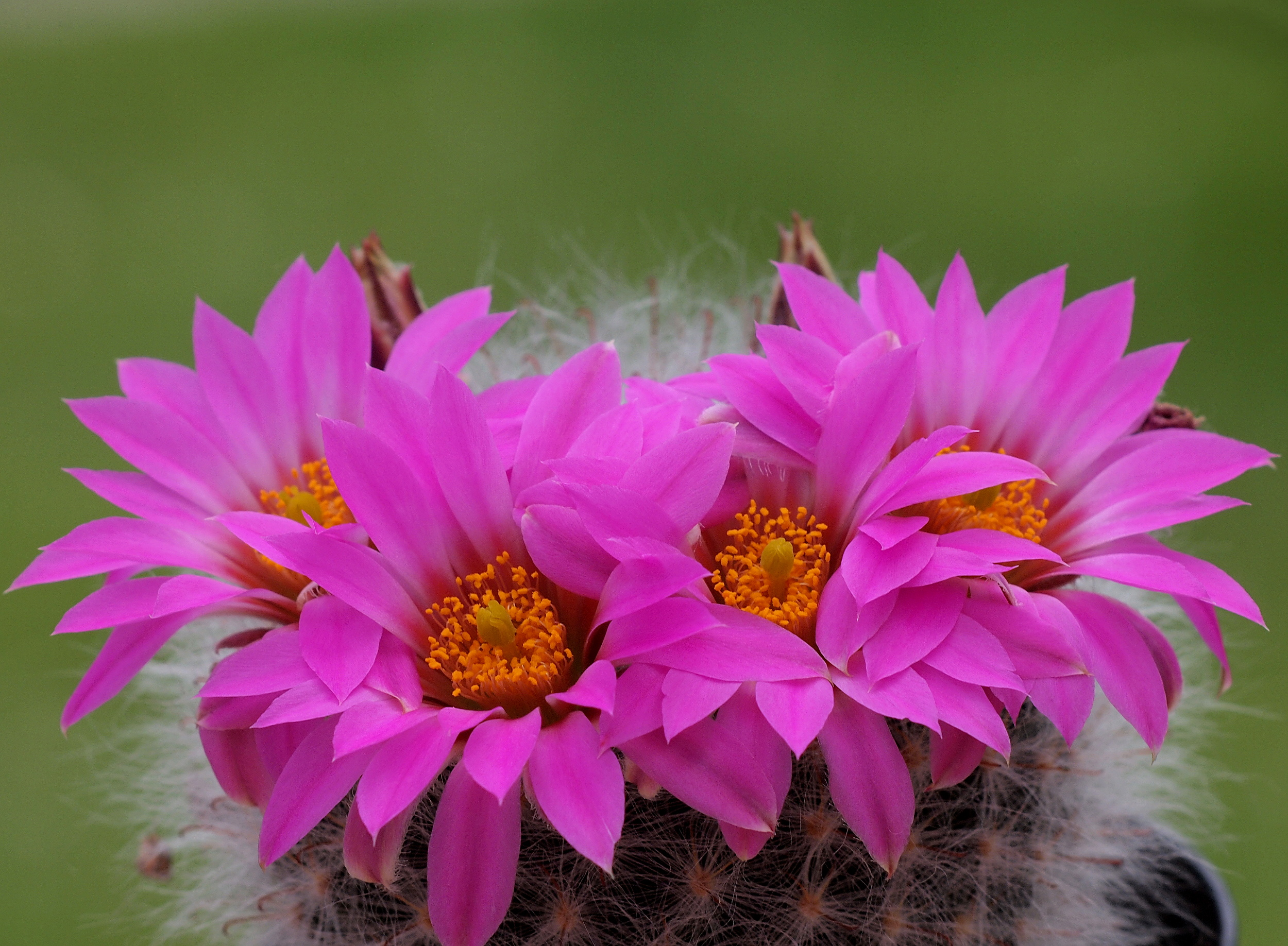
Flowers

== Distribution ==
This species is endemic to Mexico where it grows west of Nazas and north of Navidad Mine in Indé Municipality, Durango; Coahuila; and Nuevo León. Its natural habitat are hot deserts and grassy mountain tops on rocky outcrops at elevations of 1,300–1,700 metres (4,300–5,600 ft) above sea level. Plants are found growing along Thelocactus bicolor subsp. heterochromus, Coryphantha longicornis, Stenocactus multicostatus, Echinocereus polyacanthus, Echinocereus pectinatus, Fouquieria splendens, and Cylindropuntia imbricata.

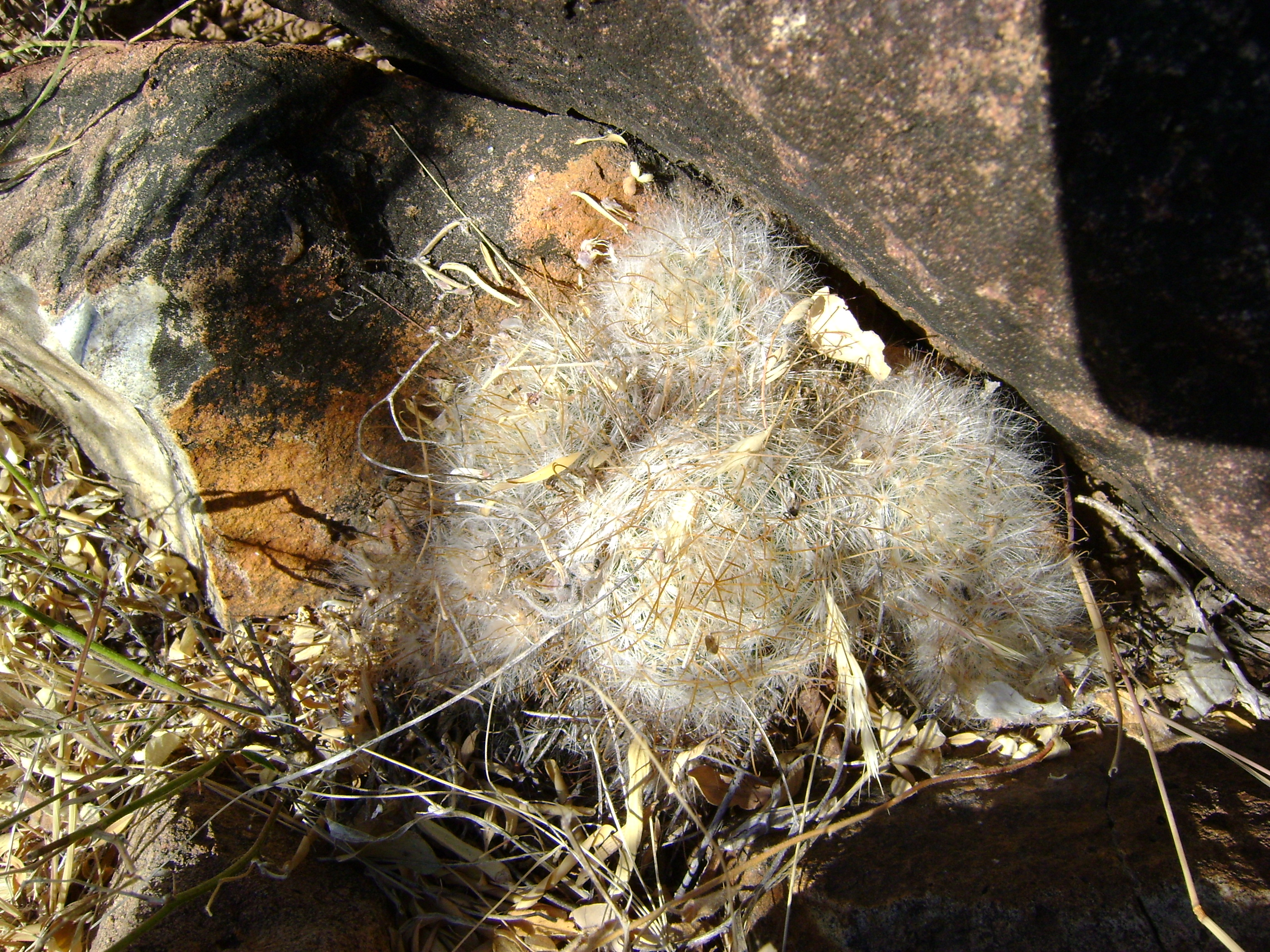
Habitat in Rio Nazas, Durango

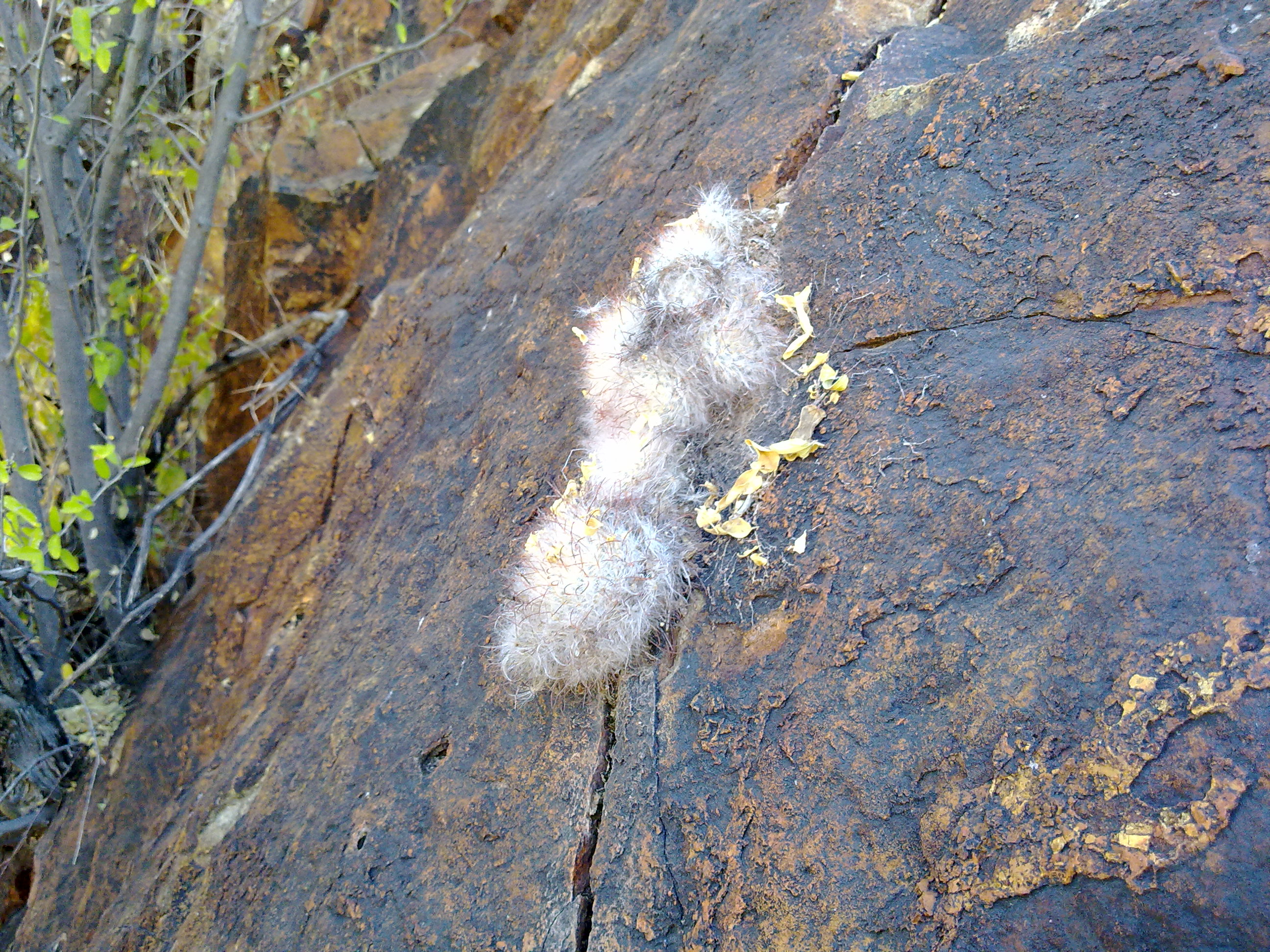
Plant growing in rock outcrop in Rio Nazas, Durango

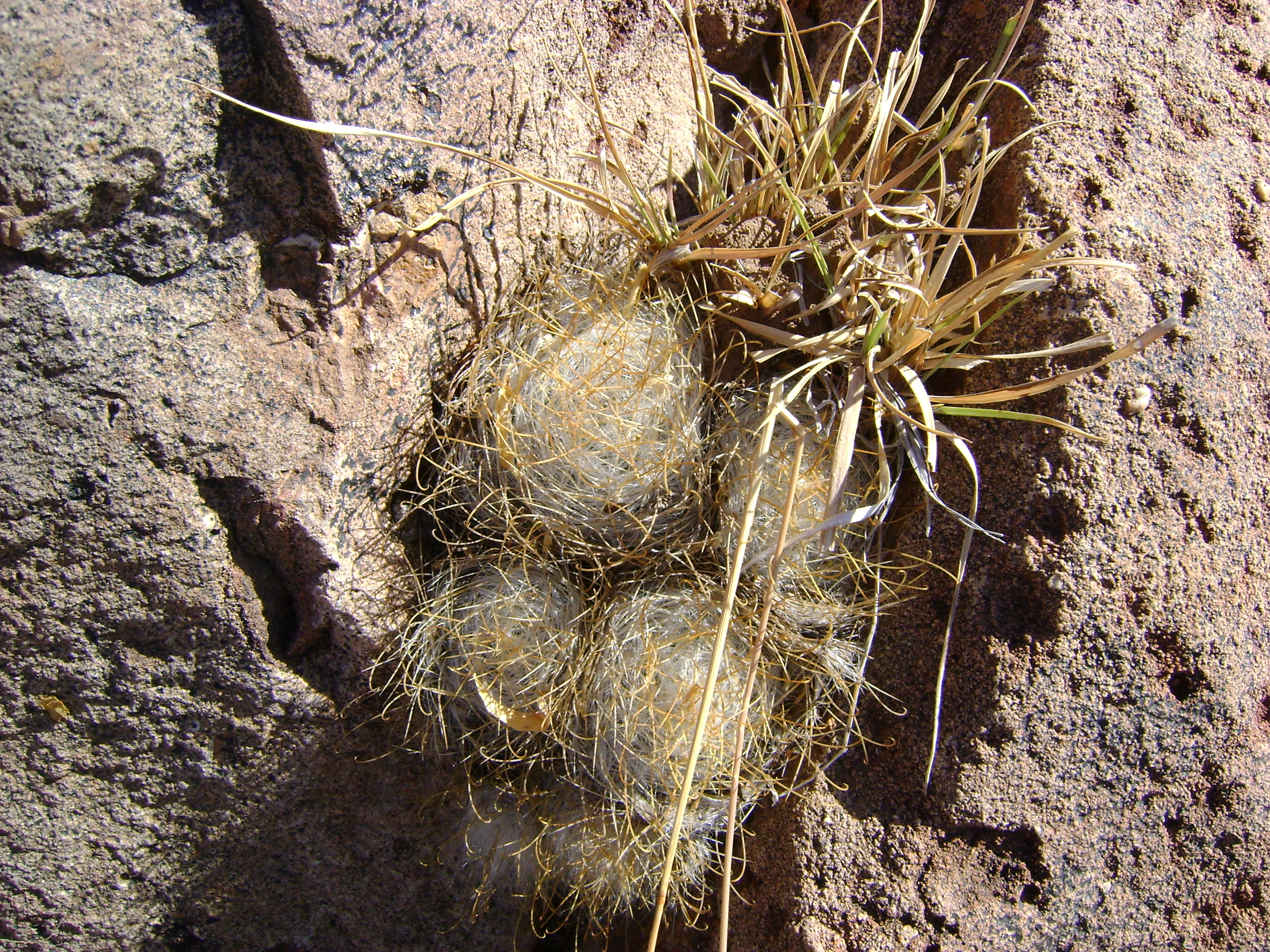
Closeup of plant growing in rock outcrop

== Taxonomy ==
This species was first described as Mammillaria guelzowiana and published in 1928 by the German botanist Erich Werdermann in the scientific journal Zeitschrift für Sukkulentenkunde 3: 356. The species epithet guelzowiana honors the German cactus collector Robert Gülzow of Berlín. Botanists Peter B. Breslin and Lucas C. Majure placed the species in the genus Cochemiea in the scientific journal Taxon 70: 319 in 2021.
