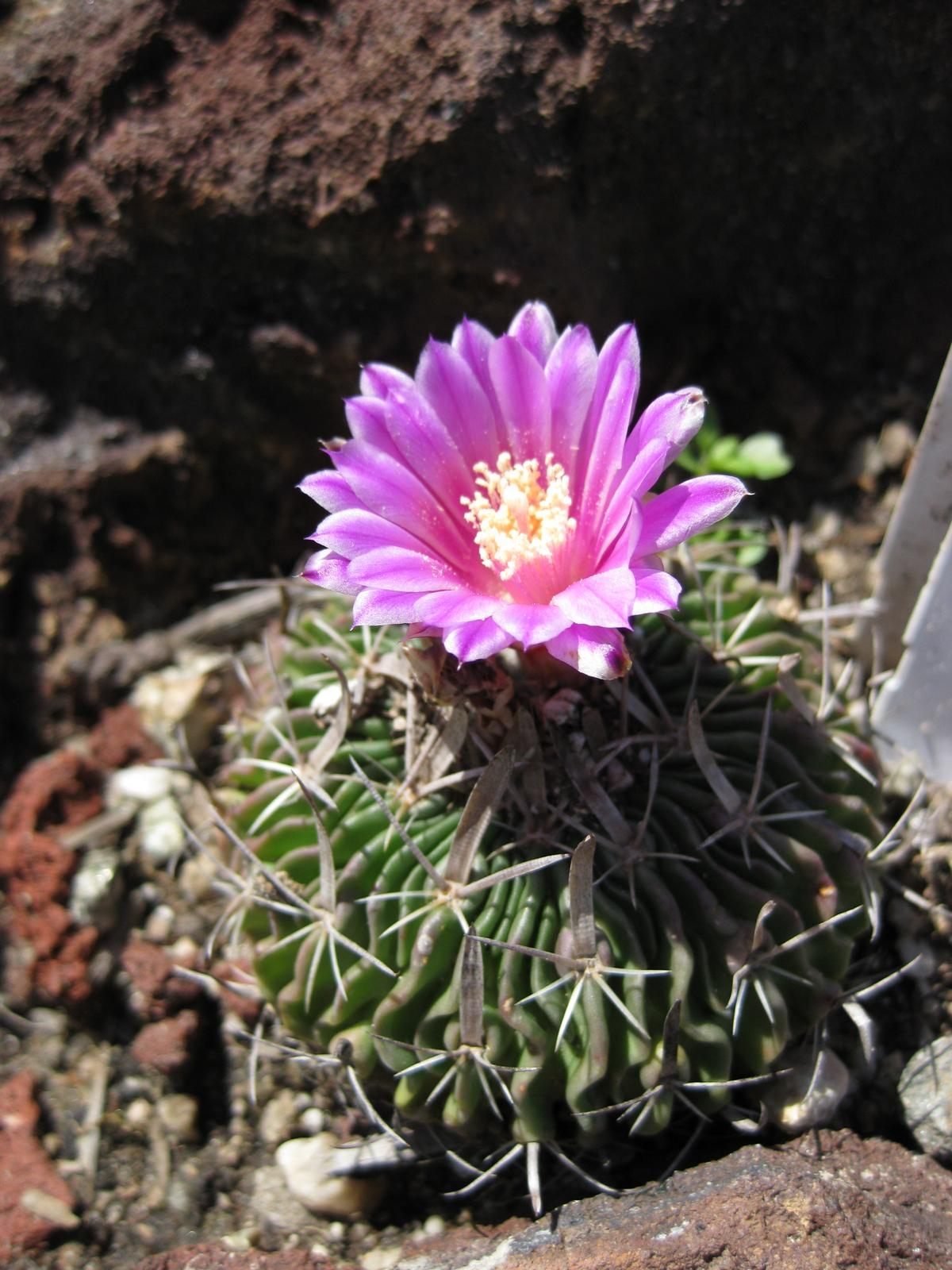

Conservation status
- Data Deficient (IUCN 3.1)

Scientific classification
- Kingdom: Plantae
- Clade: Embryophytes
- Clade: Tracheophytes
- Clade: Angiosperms
- Clade: Eudicots
- Order: Caryophyllales
- Family: Cactaceae
- Subfamily: Cactoideae
- Genus: Stenocactus
- Species: S. crispatus

Binomial name
- Stenocactus crispatus (DC.) A.Berger (1929)

Synonyms
- List: Brittonrosea crispata (DC.) Speg.; Echinocactus crispatus DC.; Echinofossulocactus crispatus (DC.) Lawr.; Efossus crispatus (DC.) Orcutt; Ferocactus crispatus (DC.) N.P.Taylor

= Stenocactus crispatus =

Species of cactus

Stenocactus crispatus, formerly known as Echinofossulocactus crispatus, is a species of cactus native to the deserts of Mexico. Along with other members of the genus Stenocactus, it is also known as the "brain cactus".

== Description ==
Stenocactus crispatus grows up to 20 cm (7.9 in) tall and 10 cm (3.9 in) wide is a bluish-green to dark olive-green colour and globose obovoid or short-cylindric in habit. It has 3-4 very long flattened central spines 1–10 cm (0.39–3.94 in) in length that are variable in colour from white through yellow to an almost black dark brown. These central spines are surrounded by 4-6 radial spines that are 0.5–1 cm (0.20–0.39 in) long. It is similar to Stenocactus multicostatus and equally variable, although often with a darker stem and with less numerous ribs, usually 30-60 as opposed to 50-100 for S. multicostatus.

Its flowers are pale pink with purple or violet mid-veins 4 cm (1.6 in) in diameter, well developed and covered with imbricating scales.

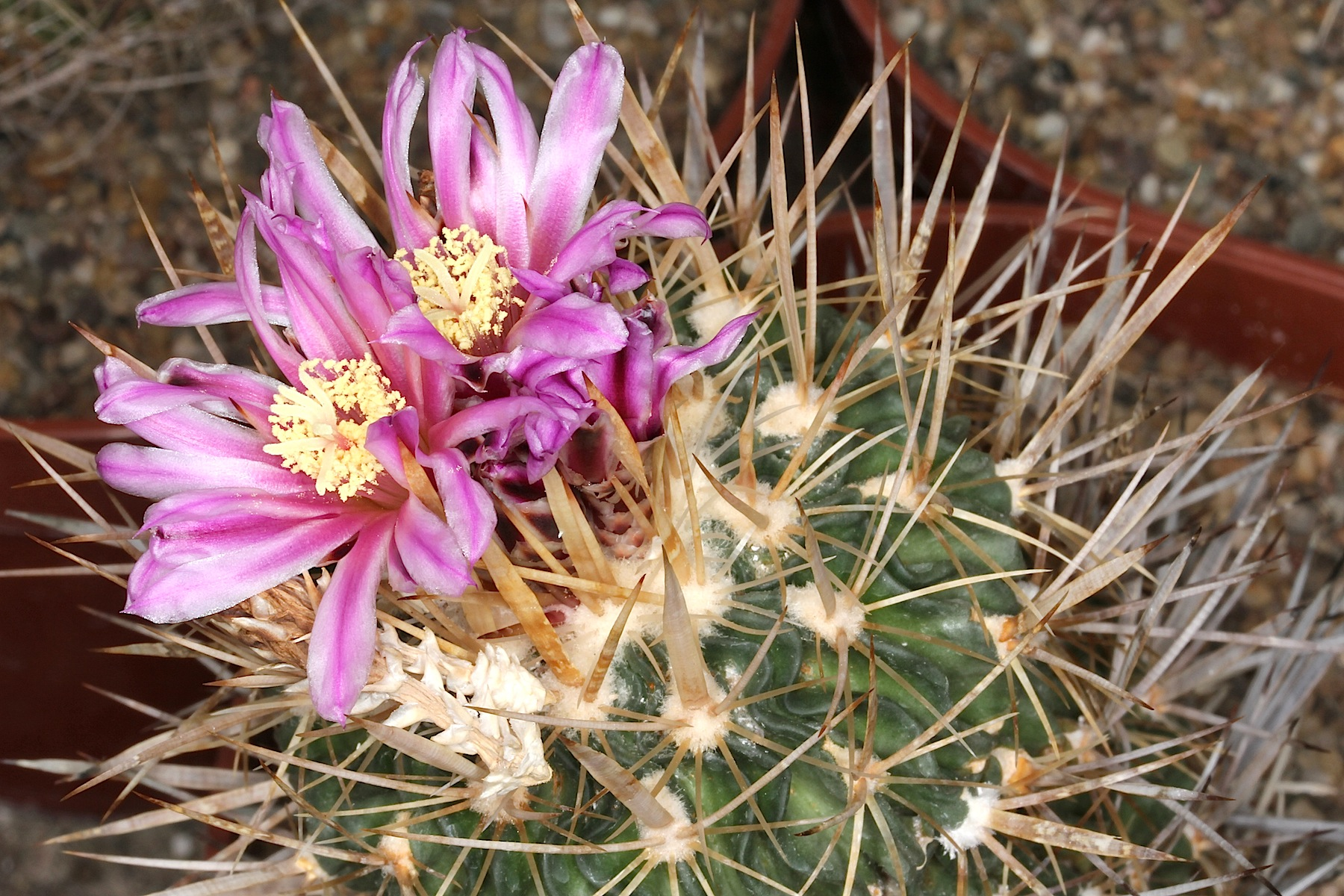
Plant

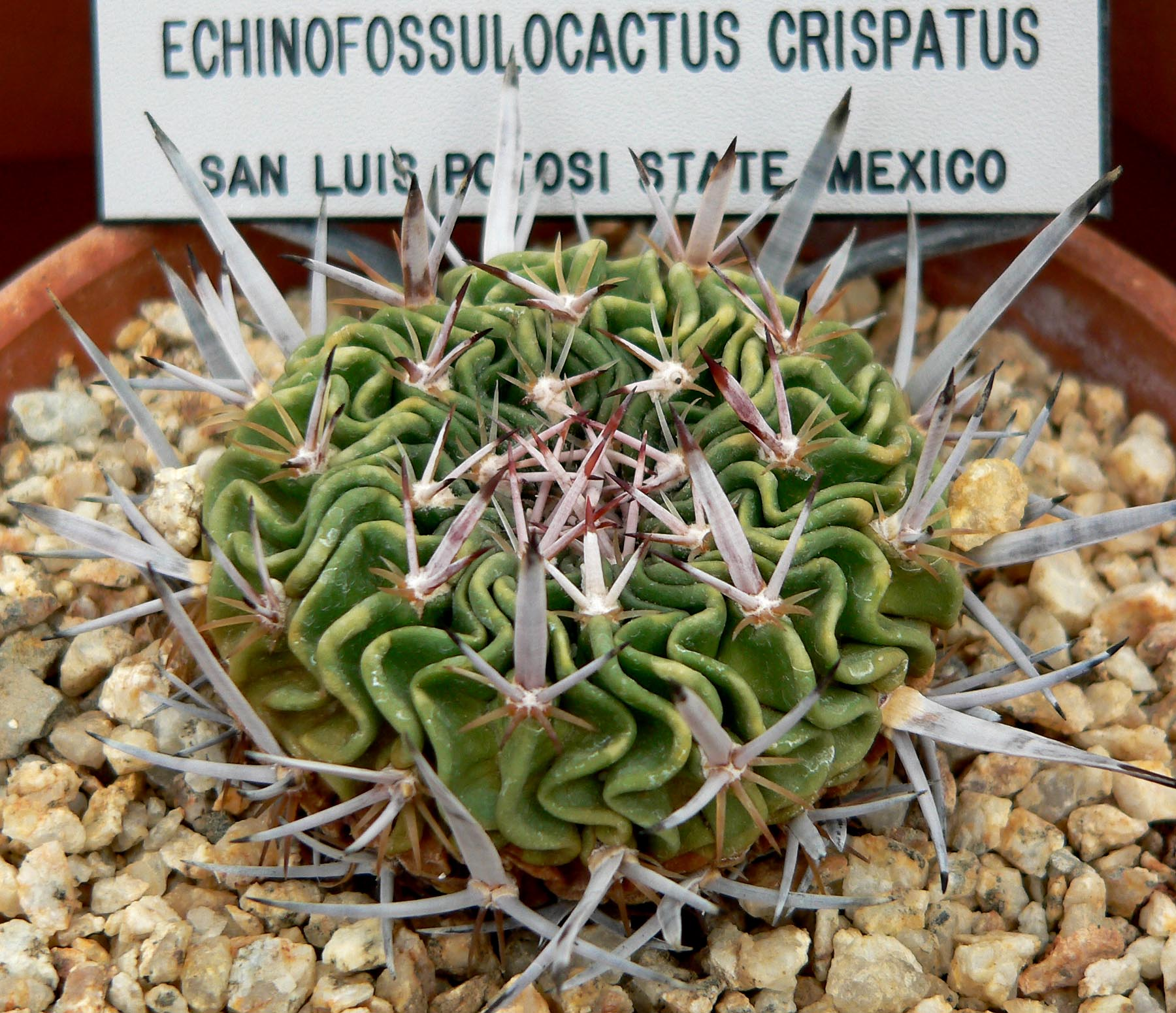

== Distribution ==
Stenocactus crispatus is found in Hidalgo, Queretaro, Veracruz, Oaxaca and Puebla in north and central Mexico.
