= Echinofossulocactus =

Two genera of cacti were once named Echinofossulocactus:

- Echinofossulocactus Lawr., now included in the genus Echinocactus
- Echinofossulocactus Britton & Rose, now included in the genus Stenocactus
