= Cumplido =

Cumplido is a Spanish surname meaning "well done" or "perfect". Notable people with the surname include:

- Francisco Cumplido (1930–2022), Chilean politician
- Guadalupe Gracia García-Cumplido (1881–1948), Mexican military surgeon
- Juan Nepomuceno Cumplido (1793–1851), Mexican politician, former governor of Jalisco
