= Brain cactus =

Brain cactus may refer to:

- Stenocactus multicostatus, a cactus native to Mexico
- Mammillaria elongata cultivar Cristata
