= Abronia ochoterenai =

Conservation status
- Data Deficient (IUCN 3.1)
- CITES Appendix II

Scientific classification
- Kingdom: Animalia
- Phylum: Chordata
- Class: Reptilia
- Order: Squamata
- Suborder: Anguimorpha
- Family: Anguidae
- Genus: Abronia
- Species: A. ochoterenai

Binomial name
- Abronia ochoterenai (Martín del Campo, 1939)
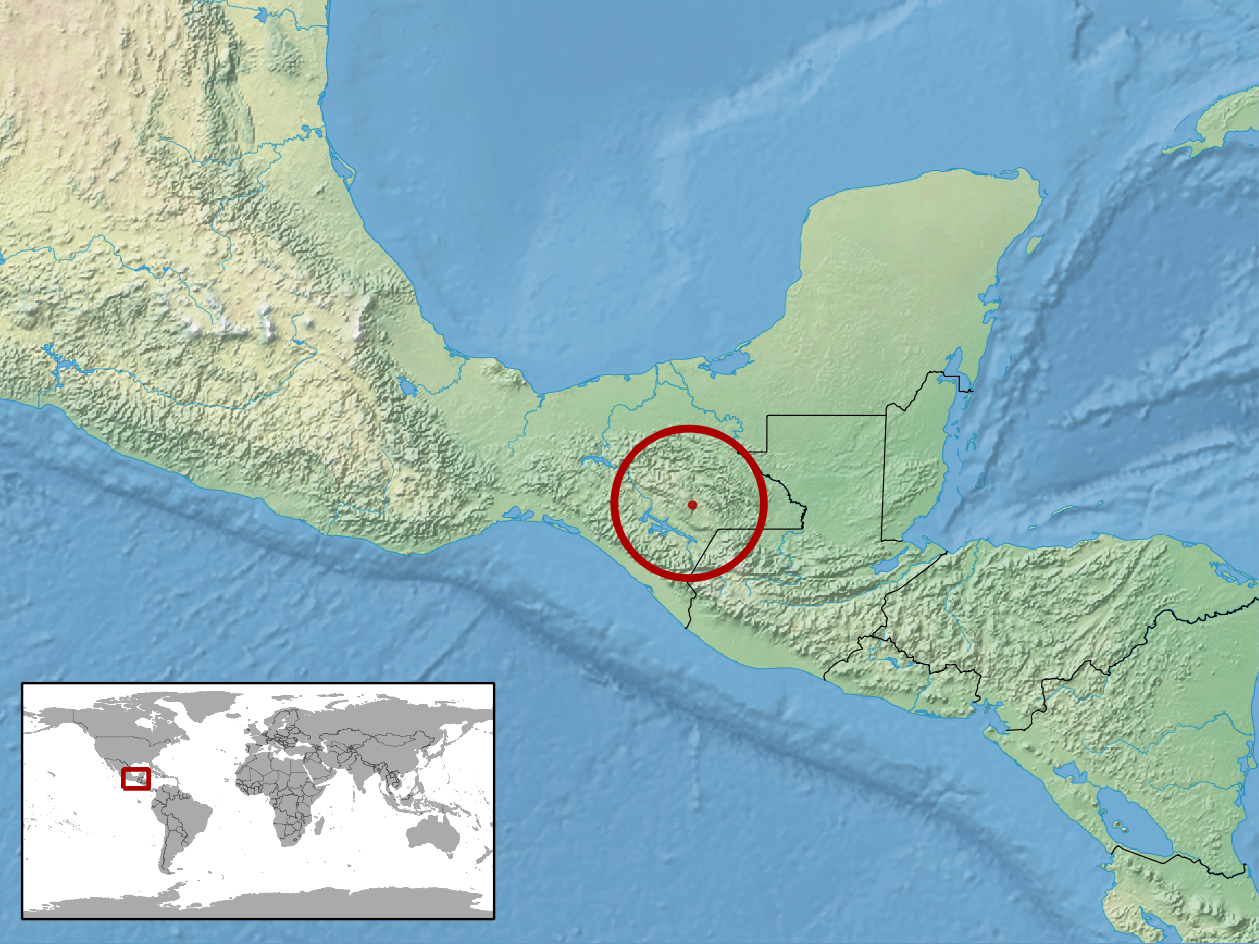

Synonyms
- Gerrhonotus vasconcelosii ochoterenai Martín del Campo, 1939; Gerrhonotus ochoterenai — Hartweg & Tihen, 1946; Abronia ochoterenai — Tihen, 1949

Species of lizard

Abronia ochoterenai, also known commonly as Ochoterena's arboreal alligator lizard, the northern Chiapas arboreal alligator lizard, and escorpión arboricola de Ochoterena in Mexican Spanish, is a species of arboreal alligator lizard in the subfamily Gerrhonotinae of the family Anguidae. The species, which is native to extreme southern Mexico, was described in 1939 by Rafael Martín del Campo.

== Etymology ==
The specific name, ochoterenai, is in honor of Mexican biologist Isaac Ochoterena Mendieta.

== Geographic range ==
Abronia ochoterenai is endemic to the Mexican state of Chiapas, where it is found at elevations of 1,800–2,300 m (5,900–7,500 ft).

== Habitat ==
The preferred natural habitat of Abronia ochoterenai is forest.

== Behavior ==
Abronia ochoterenai is arboreal.

== Reproduction ==
Abronia ochoterenai is viviparous.
