= Francisco Montes de Oca y Saucedo =

Mexican politician

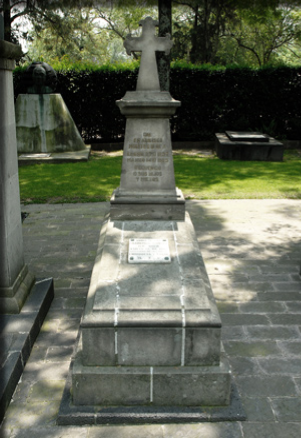
FranciscoMontesdeOcatombDoloresDF

Francisco Montes de Oca y Saucedo (January 27, 1837 – March 14, 1885) was a Mexican politician and military surgeon with the rank of General Brigadier Médico Cirujano (Brigadier General MC).

== Life ==
Francisco Montes was born in Mexico City. He was the son of Alejandro Montes de Oca, a military officer killed in the Battle of Buena Vista in February 1847, and his wife Guadalupe Saucedo.

Montes attended the Colegio de San Juan de Letrán and afterwards courses of physics and botany at the Escuela Nacional de Medicina (currently Faculty of Medicine of the UNAM). In 1856 he began his studies of medicine. He had several assignments in civilian clinics. He took part in the battles during the Reform War (1858–1861), and in the Battle of Tacubaya, where he was given thanks by an order from General Santos Degollado. He worked during the French intervention in Mexico (1861–1867). In 1863 he married Lucía Durán. From 1861 he worked as prosector and was director of anatomic works. In the rank of a Colonel (MC) he worked as director of the medical hospital in Mexico City from 1867 to 1876 and from 1878 to 1885. In 1874 he became Professor of Clinical Surgery at the Escuela Nacional de Medicina. In 1880 he founded Escuela Práctica Médico-Militar (predecessor of the Escuela Constitucionalista Médico Militar) of which he was the primary leader. In 1982 he was promoted to the rank of General Brigadier (MC).

During the battle of May 5 in Puebla, he attended the soldiers (French and Mexican). During the Second Battle of Puebla in 1863 invented the acromioclavicular amputation (more simple than the Larrey), invented in the same time that Le Fort (French Surgical) the racquet amputation from the tig election. Wrote the medical news in "Annales de la Sociedad Larrey", where he caught every experience about the military war in the Mexico from the second time of the 19th century. He insisted on the use of the Licour the Lebarranque since 1861, started in Mexico the pre listerial age with infection mortality in 1872 from 0%.

Montes was also a liberal thinking politician. In 1882 he became Member of Parliament and in 1884 Senator. He died after suffering from a Pneumonia in Apan, Hidalgo.
