= Plestiodon ochoterenae =

- [[File:[Plestiodon ochoterenae.jpg|frameless]]

Conservation status
- Least Concern (IUCN 3.1)

Scientific classification
- Kingdom: Animalia
- Phylum: Chordata
- Class: Reptilia
- Order: Squamata
- Family: Scincidae
- Genus: Plestiodon
- Species: P. ochoterenae

Binomial name
- Plestiodon ochoterenae (Taylor, 1933)
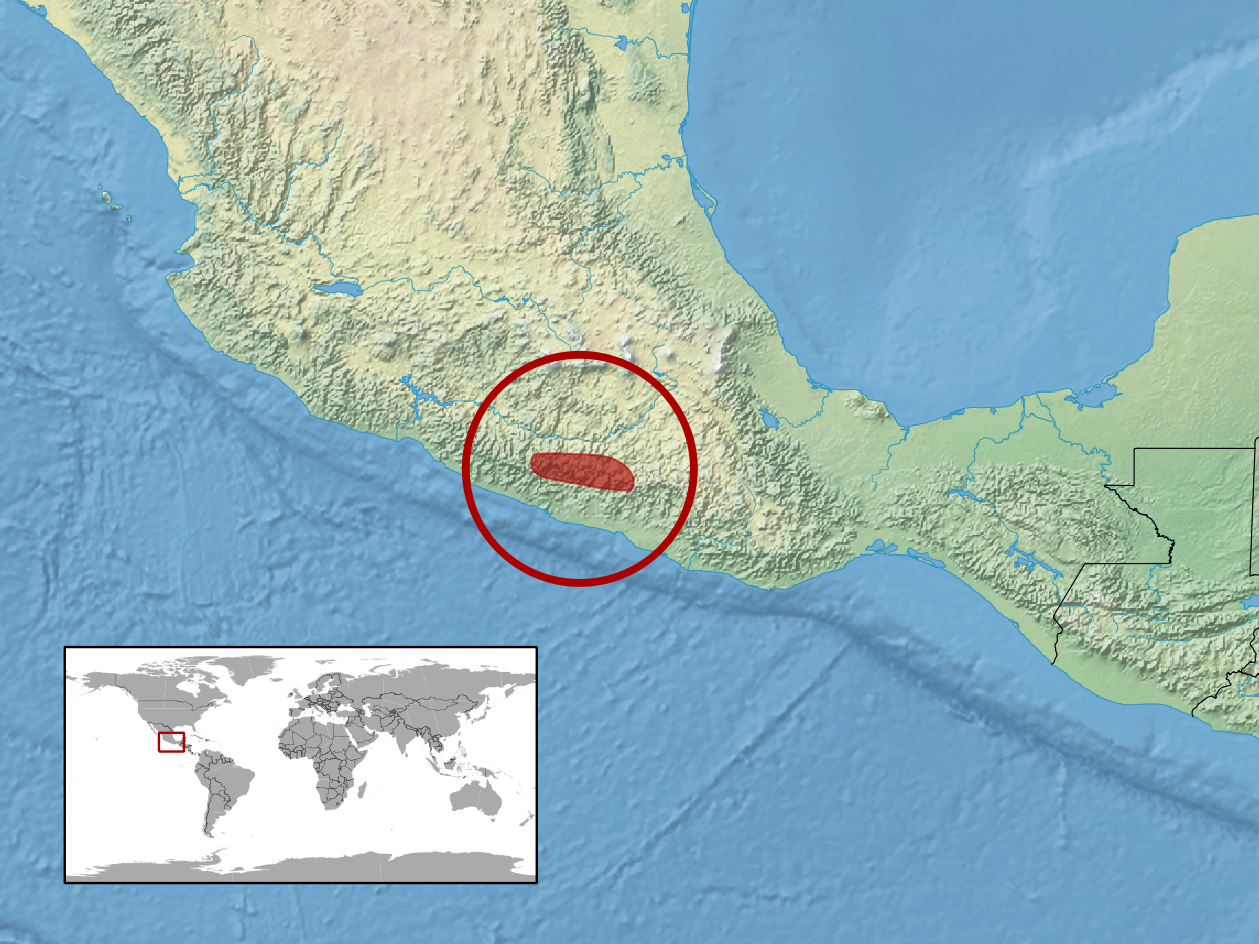

Synonyms
- Eumeces ochoterenae Taylor, 1933

Species of reptile

Plestiodon ochoterenae, also commonly known as the Guerreran skink and el eslaboncillo de Guerrero in Mexican Spanish, is a species of lizard in the subfamily Scincinae of the family Scincidae. The species is endemic to the Sierra Madre del Sur in Guerrero, Mexico.

== Etymology ==
Plestiodon ochoterenae is named after Mexican biologist Isaac Ochoterena Mendieta (1885–1950).

== Taxonomy ==
A 2021 study determined that Plestiodon ochoterenae is most closely related to Plestiodon longiartus.

== Habitat ==
The preferred natural habitat of Plestiodon ochoterenae is forest.

== Reproduction ==
Plestiodon ochoterenae is ovoviviparous.
