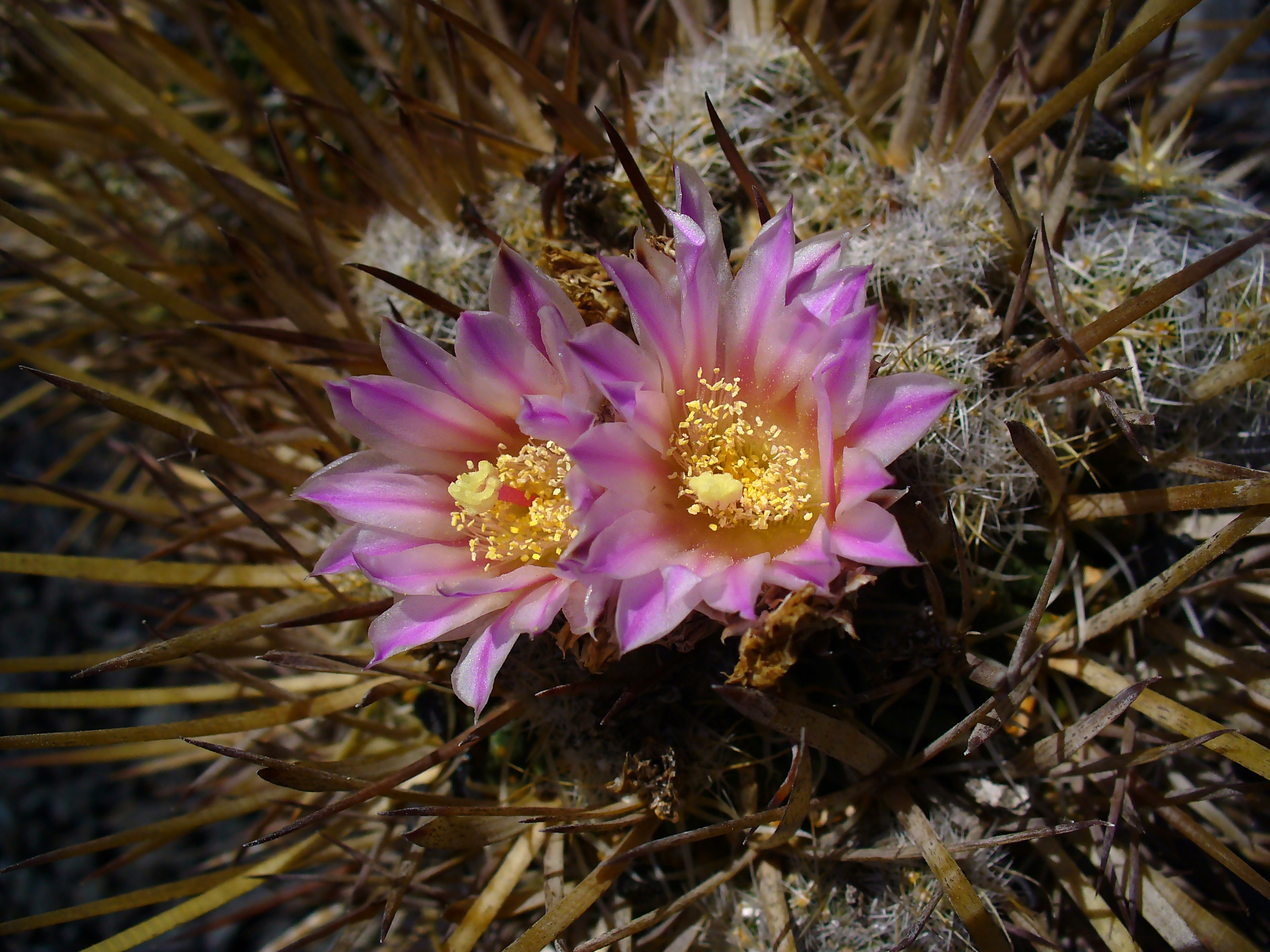

Scientific classification
- Kingdom: Plantae
- Clade: Tracheophytes
- Clade: Angiosperms
- Clade: Eudicots
- Order: Caryophyllales
- Family: Cactaceae
- Subfamily: Cactoideae
- Genus: Stenocactus
- Species: S. coptonogonus

Binomial name
- Stenocactus coptonogonus (Lem.) A.Berger

Synonyms
- List: Brittonrosea coptonogona (Lem.) Speg.; Echinocactus coptonogonus Lem.; Echinofossulocactus coptonogonus (Lem.) Lawr. in Loudon; Efossus coptonogonus (Lem.) Orcutt; Ferocactus coptonogonus (Lem.) N.P.Taylor

= Stenocactus coptonogonus =

Species of flowering plant

Stenocactus coptonogonus is a species of cactus native to the deserts of Mexico.

== Description ==
Stenocactus coptonogonus is a small (7–10 cm (2.8–3.9 in)) globose to subglobose in habit. Unlike other members of the genus Stenocactus it lacks the characteristic numerous wavy ribs instead having 10-15 stout, thick, triangular ribs 1.5 cm (0.59 in) high, 5 mm (0.20 in) or more in width. Its flowers are white with purple or violet mid-veins 3–4 cm (1.2–1.6 in) in diameter.

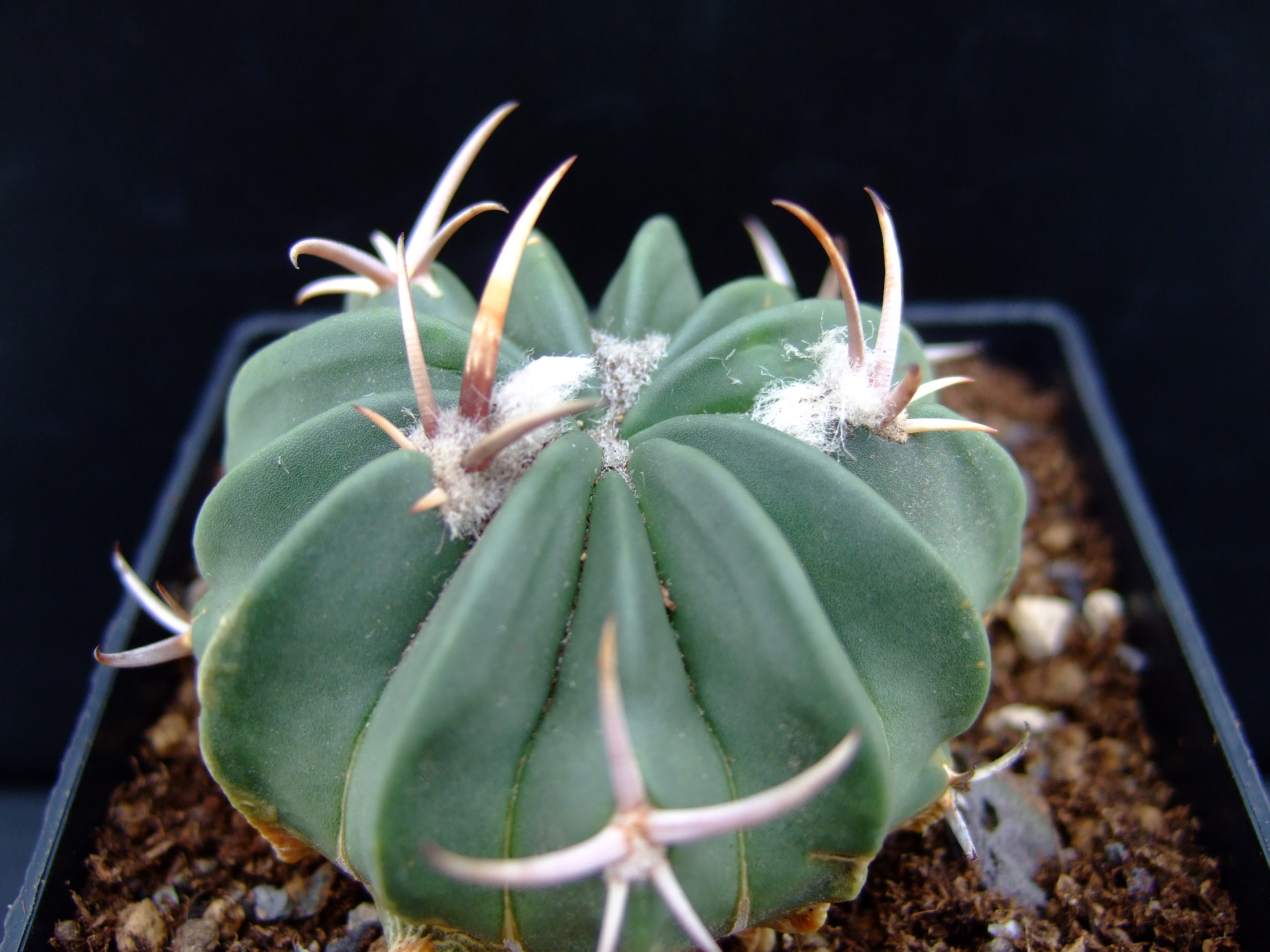
Young plant

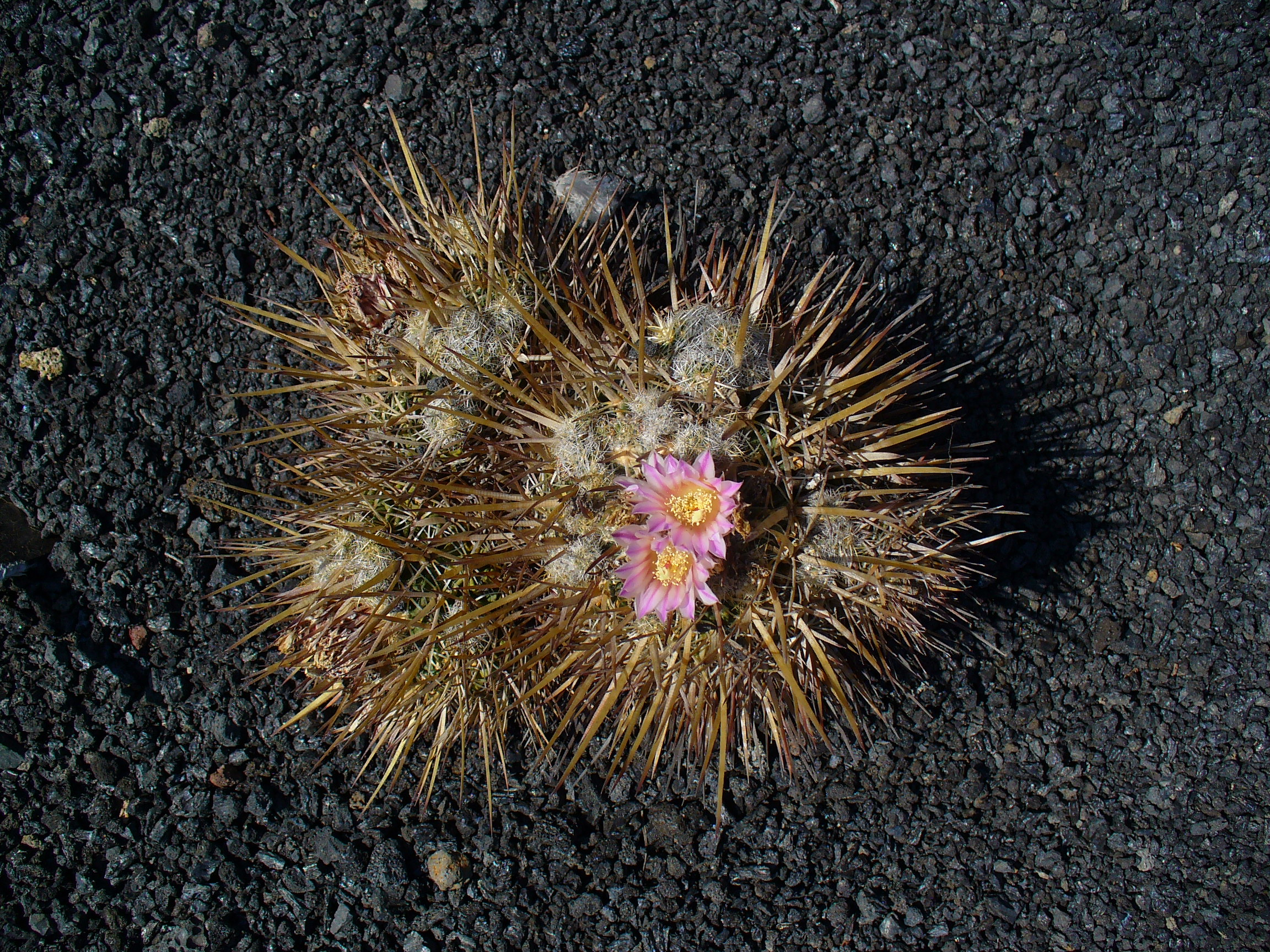

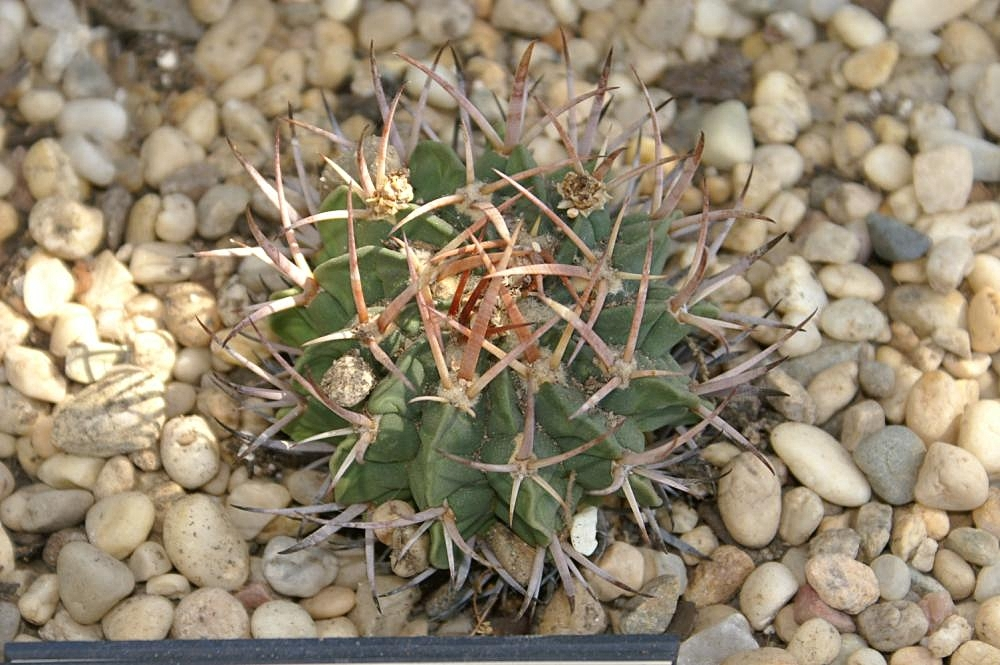

== Distribution ==
Stenocactus coptonongonus is found in Zacatecas, San Luis Potosí, Guanajuato, and Hidalgo areas of Mexico.
