= Stenocactus boedekerianus =

Scientific classification
- Kingdom: Plantae
- Clade: Embryophytes
- Clade: Tracheophytes
- Clade: Angiosperms
- Clade: Eudicots
- Order: Caryophyllales
- Family: Cactaceae
- Subfamily: Cactoideae
- Genus: Stenocactus
- Species: S. boedekerianus

Binomial name
- Stenocactus boedekerianus A.Berger

Synonyms
- List: Echinocactus boedekerianus A.Berger; Echinofossulocactus boedekerianus {au; (A.Berger) Croizat

Species of cactus

Stenocactus boedekerianus is a species of cactus native to the northeast of Mexico.

== Distribution ==
Stenocactus boedekerianus is found in northeast Mexico.
