= Sceloporus ochoterenae =

Conservation status
- Least Concern (IUCN 3.1)

Scientific classification
- Kingdom: Animalia
- Phylum: Chordata
- Class: Reptilia
- Order: Squamata
- Suborder: Iguania
- Family: Phrynosomatidae
- Genus: Sceloporus
- Species: S. ochoterenae

Binomial name
- Sceloporus ochoterenae H.M. Smith, 1934

Species of lizard

Sceloporus ochoterenae, also known commonly as Ochoterena's lizard, the Queretaran spiny lizard, and la lagartija chata de Ochoterena in Mexican Spanish, is a species of lizard in the subfamily Sceloporinae of the family Phrynosomatidae. The species is endemic to Mexico.

== Etymology ==
The specific name, ochoterenae, is in honor of Mexican biologist Isaac Ochoterena Mendieta.

== Geographic distribution ==
Sceloporus ochoterenae is found in the central Mexican states of Guerrero, Morelos, Oaxaca, and Puebla, and the Distrito Federal.

== Habitat ==
The preferred natural habitat of Sceloporus ochterenae is forest, but it has also been found in agriculturally disturbed habitats such as corn fields.

== Reproduction ==
Sceloporus ochoterenae is oviparous.
