= Escuela Médico Militar =

Coordinates: 19.4346°N 99.2145°W

The Escuela Médico Militar is a medical school of the Mexican army and Mexican air force for medical training. The school is located in Mexico City, Mexico.

Un círculo con el escudo de Sanidad, dentro un haz de varas circundado por una serpiente con cabeza reflejada en un espejo.

== History ==
The school was founded as Escuela Constitucionalista Médico Militar by Generals Guadalupe Gracia García-Cumplido and Enrique Cornelio Osornio Martínez de los Ríos in 1917. It is deemed to be the follow-on institution of the Escuela Práctica Médico-Militar which was founded for practical training of military physicians at the San Lucas military hospital in Mexico City by its first director Francisco Montes de Oca y Saucedo in 1880.

The Escuela Médico Militar is under the command of the general direction of military education and rectorate of the university of the army and the air force, a department of the Secretaría de la Defensa Nacional (SEDENA).

== Notable faculty ==
- Guadalupe Gracia García-Cumplido, also founder and director
- Enrique Cornelio Osornio Martínez de los Ríos, also founder and director
- Fernando Ocaranza Carmona
- Edmundo Calva Cuadrilla
- Segismundo Rodríguez Rodríguez
- Martha Patricia Fernandez

== Notable alumni ==
- Jesús Kumate Rodríguez
- Jesús Lozoya Solís
