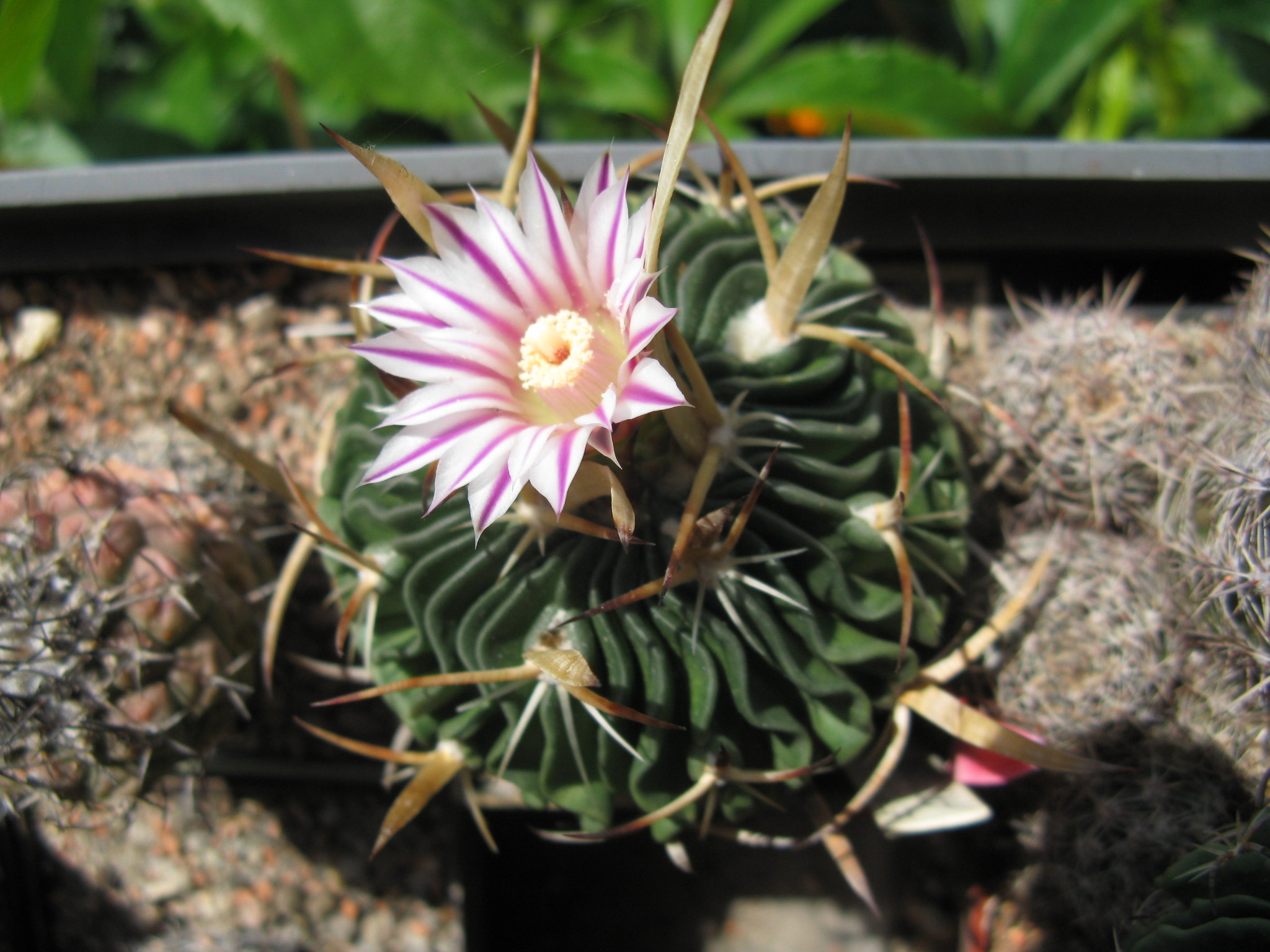

Conservation status
- Data Deficient (IUCN 3.1)

Scientific classification
- Kingdom: Plantae
- Clade: Embryophytes
- Clade: Tracheophytes
- Clade: Angiosperms
- Clade: Eudicots
- Order: Caryophyllales
- Family: Cactaceae
- Subfamily: Cactoideae
- Genus: Stenocactus
- Species: S. obvallatus

Binomial name
- Stenocactus obvallatus (DC.) A.Berger

Synonyms
- List: Brittonrosea obvallata; (DC.) Speg.; Echinocactus obvallatus; DC.; Echinofossulocactus crispatus f. obvallatus; (DC.) P.V.Heath; Echinofossulocactus obvallatus; (DC.) Lawr.; Efossus obvallatus; (DC.) Orcutt

= Stenocactus obvallatus =

Species of cactus

Stenocactus obvallatus is a species of cactus native to the deserts of Mexico.

== Description ==
Stenocactus obvallatus is a spheroid cactus with numerous, though usually 30 to 40 and typically less than 50, wavy blue-green ribs. They have white areoles with 5–12 greyish-brown spines. Its flowering period is normally during spring. It has pale yellow to pale pink flowers, with a purplish-red stripe that grow to 2 cm (0.79 in). They enjoy full sun and need a minimum temperature of 10 °C (50 °F).

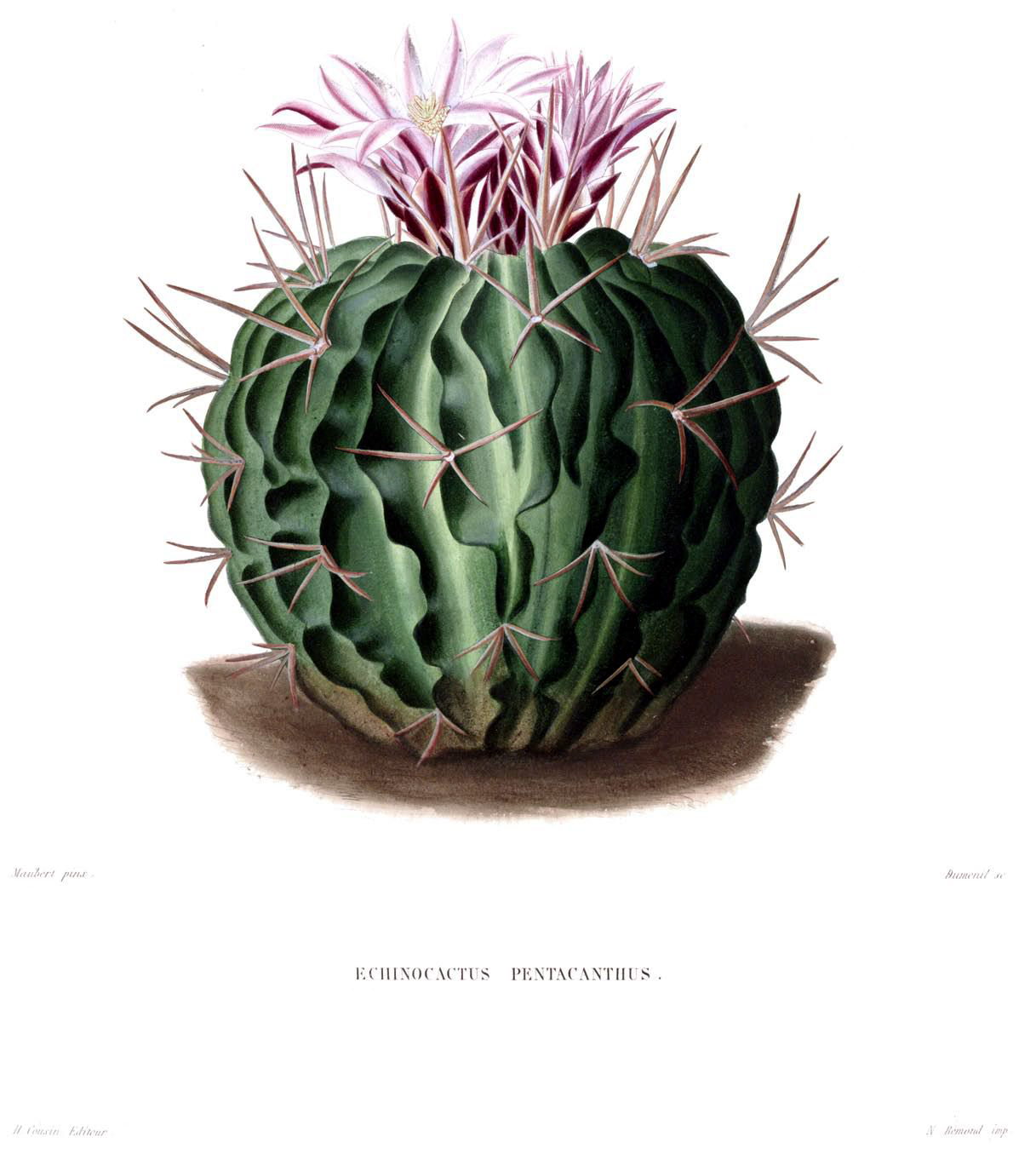

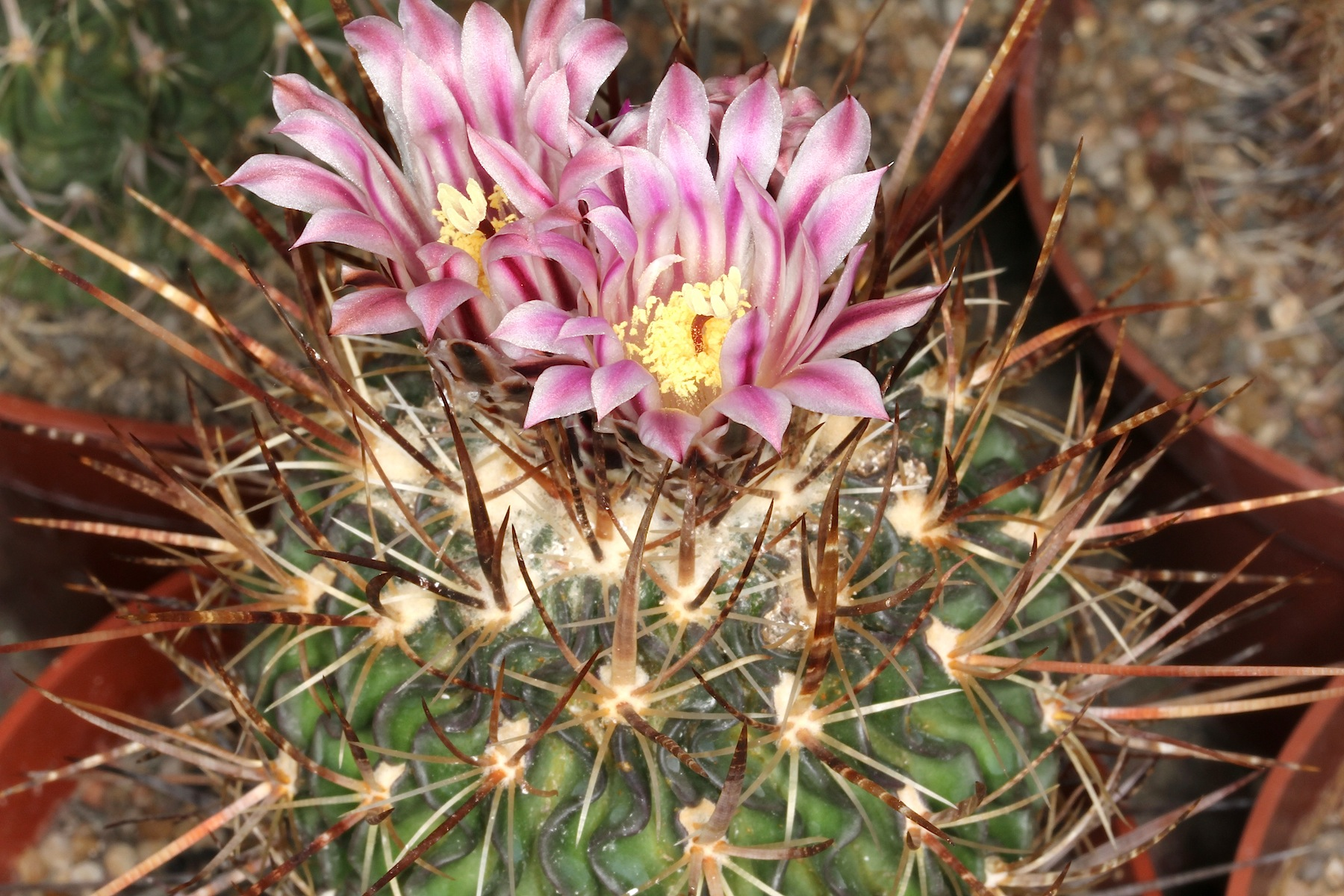

== Distribution ==
Stenocactus obvallatus is found in the states of Aguascalientes, Durango, Guanajuato, Hidalgo, México State, Oaxaca, Querétaro, San Luis Potosí, and Tamaulipas.
