= Ochotorena =

Ochotorena is a surname. Notable people with the surname include:

- Isaac Ochoterena (1885–1950), Mexican biologist
- José Manuel Ochotorena (1961–2025), Spanish footballer
- Manuel Arce y Ochotorena (1879–1948), Spanish cardinal
