= Plestiodon longiartus =

Scientific classification
- Domain: Eukaryota
- Kingdom: Animalia
- Phylum: Chordata
- Class: Reptilia
- Order: Squamata
- Family: Scincidae
- Genus: Plestiodon
- Species: P. longiartus

Binomial name
- Plestiodon longiartus García-Vázquez, Pavón-Vázquez, Feria-Ortiz & Nieto-Montes De Oca, 2021

Species of reptile

Plestiodon longiartus is a species of skink which is endemic to Mexico.

The lizard is found in the Sierra Madre del Sur in Guerrero, Mexico. It was described in 2021, and was determined to be most closely related to Plestiodon ochoterenae.

Plestiodon longiartus measure 36–67 mm (1.4–2.6 in) in snout–vent length.
