= Enrique Cornelio Osornio Martínez de los Ríos =

Mexican politician

Enrique Cornelio Osornio Martínez de los Ríos (September 16, 1868 – April 1, 1945) was a Mexican politician and military surgeon with the rank General Brigadier Médico Cirujano (Brigadier General MC).

== Life ==
Osornio Martínez was born in Santiago de Querétaro, and was the son of Jesús Osornio and Refugio Martínez de los Ríos.

He attended the Colegio San Luis Gonzaga and afterwards the Colegio Civil of Querétaro from 1883 to 1887. In 1892 he began his studies at the Escuela Nacional de Medicina (currently Faculty of Medicine of the UNAM) in Mexico City and graduated in 1893. As an officer candidate he completed the Escuela Práctica Médico-Militar (predecessor of the Escuela Médico Militar) at the military teaching hospital and made his specialty training in ophthalmology in the United States and in Canada from 1893 to 1895. In 1896 he married María Elvira Camarena Aldana and worked in Aguascalientes. He also was a liberal thinking politician, active in the city of Aguascalientes from 1903 to 1911 and as Deputy Governor of Aguascalientes from 1910 to 1911. From 1914 he served as a military surgeon on the side of revolutionary forces during the revolution, was promoted to the rank of Brigadier General (MC) in 1916. From June 1, 1916 to December 11, 1917 as well as from December 4, 1920 to December 16, 1934 he served as head of the medical branch in the Secretaría de Guerra y Marina. He was one of the founders of the Escuela Constitucionalista Médico Militar where he was director and taught as Professor of pathology, medical therapy and ophthalmology. From 1933 to 1934 he was director of the journal "Gaceta Médico Militar", the organ of the Mexican military branch. He died in Mexico City.

== Awards ==
- Gold medal, First class of the Spanish Red Cross (1924)
