= Guadalupe Gracia García-Cumplido =

Guadalupe Gracia García-Cumplido (December 12, 1881 – March 31, 1948) was a Mexican military surgeon with the rank General Brigadier Médico Cirujano (Brigadier General MC).

== Life ==
Gracia García-Cumplido was born in La Constancia, Municipio Nombre de Dios/Durango. He was the son of the journalist Carmen Gracía García-Nájera and his wife Daría Cumplido Sáenz, and had two siblings.

During the Mexican Revolution, he belonged to the Primera Brigada (First Brigade) which marched on Ciudad Juárez to oust Porfirio Díaz from power. He founded the revolutionary paper El Noroeste and began his studies at the Escuela Nacional de Medicina (currently Faculty of Medicine of the UNAM) in Mexico City. Gracia García-Cumplido was cofounder of the Neutral White Cross society (Cruz Blanca Neutral), as well as one of the founders of Escuela Constitucionalista Médico Militar, where he was director and professor of clinical and therapeutic surgery, clinic of traumatology and emergency surgery. He was director of the military teaching hospital, the later-built military central hospital, and of the Juárez hospital.

During the Mexican Revolution, Gracia-García invented the hospital-surgical-train, in which the soldiers were to be operated on in the midst of battle. He started the abdominal trauma reconstruction and orthopaedic trauma (1913–1915) reconstruction in their surgical-train. He wrote about their experience in the "Revista de Cirugía", a medical paper from the Juarez Hospital.

Gracia García-Cumplido was married to the pharmacist Guadalupe Martínez Barragán and died in Mexico City.
