= Fernando Ocaranza Carmona =

Mexican surgeon

Fernando Ocaranza Carmona (1876 in Mexico City – 1965 in Mexico City) was a Mexican surgeon, rector of the Universidad Nacional Autónoma de México (UNAM), and military in the rank of a Coronel (MC).

Ocaranza, son of Ramón Ocaranza and his wife Antonia Carmona, visited the Instituto Científico y Literario de Toluca, studied at the Escuela Práctica Médico Militar, and graduated at the Escuela Nacional de Medicina. Reportedly he passed his practical training in the Guaymas Municipal Hospital, in the Hospital de la Cruz Roja (Red Cross Hospital), in the military hospital and in the General Hospital in Mexico City. In 1901 he married Loreto Esquer, who gave birth to their son José, who also studied medicine.

Fernando Ocaranza himself graduated in 1909, became director of the Institute of Biology. After 1915 he lectured, was professor of physiology at the Escuela Médico Militar and at the Escuela Nacional de Medicina, where he was also secretary general from 1921 to 1923, and director from 1924 to 1934. Furthermore, he was professor at the Escuela Nacional de Altos Estudios (ENEA). On November 26, 1934, he became rector of the UNAM, and held the office until September 17, 1935. In 1945 he became a member of the university council, and was retired from the army in 1947. In 1949 he became honorary doctor of the UNAM.

== Publications ==
- 1931: Lecciones de Biología General
- 1933-1934: Capítulos de Historia Franciscana
- 1934: El imperial colegio de indios de la Santa Cruz de Santiago Tlaltelolco, Colegio de Santa Cruz de Tlaltelolco
- 1939: Crónica de las Provincias Internas de la Nueva España in The Hispanic American Historical Review, vol. 20, No. 1, pp. 138–139
- 1940: Fisiología Humana
- 1940: Novela de un Médico (autobiography)
- 1943: La tragedia de un Rector (autobiography)
