= Ochoterenaea =

Scientific classification
- Kingdom: Plantae
- Clade: Tracheophytes
- Clade: Angiosperms
- Clade: Eudicots
- Clade: Rosids
- Order: Sapindales
- Family: Anacardiaceae
- Genus: Ochoterenaea; F.A.Barkley
- Species: O. colombiana

Binomial name
- Ochoterenaea colombiana F.A.Barkley

Synonyms
- Rhus juglandifolia var. lindeniana (Turcz.) Engl.; Rhus lindeniana Turcz.

Species of flowering plant

Ochoterenaea is a monotypic genus of flowering plants belonging to the family Anacardiaceae. The only species is Ochoterenaea colombiana.

Its native range is Western South America and it is found in Bolivia, Colombia and Venezuela.

The genus name of Ochoterenaea is in honour of Isaac Ochoterena (1885–1950), a Mexican botanist and histologist. He also taught at the University of Mexico. The Latin specific epithet of colombiana means coming from Colombia, where the plant was found. Both the genus and the species were first described and published in Bull. Torrey Bot. Club Vol.69 on page 442 in 1942.
