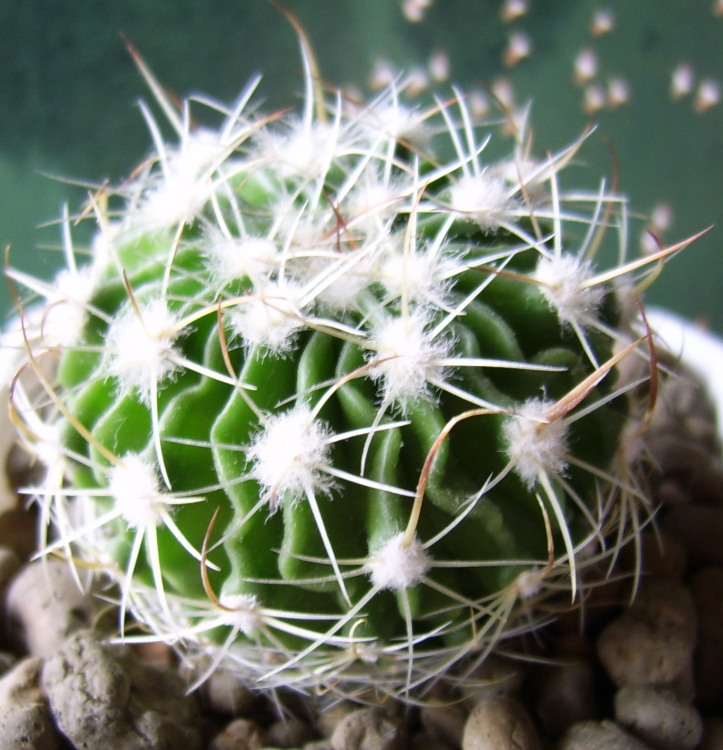
- Stenocactus sp.

Scientific classification
- Kingdom: Plantae
- Clade: Tracheophytes
- Clade: Angiosperms
- Clade: Eudicots
- Order: Caryophyllales
- Family: Cactaceae
- Subfamily: Cactoideae
- Tribe: Cacteae
- Genus: Stenocactus (K.Schum.) A.Berger

Species
- See text

= Stenocactus =

Genus of plant

Stenocactus is a genus of cacti in the Cactaceae family.

== Synonymy ==
The following genera have been brought into synonymy with Stenocactus:

- Echinofossulocactus Britton & Rose
- Efossus Orcutt (orth. var.)

== Species ==
Image	Scientific name	Distribution
	Stenocactus boedekerianus A.Berger	Mexico Northeast
	Stenocactus coptonogonus (Lem.) A.Berger	Mexico (Guanajuato, Hidalgo, San Luis Potosí, Zacatecas )
	Stenocactus crispatus (DC.) A.Berger	Mexico (Oaxaca, Puebla, Zacatecas)
	Stenocactus multicostatus (Hildm.) A.Berger	Mexico (Chihuahua, Coahuila de Zaragoza, Durango)
	Stenocactus obvallatus (DC.) A.Berger	Mexico (Distrito Federal, Mexico)
	Stenocactus ochoterenianus Tiegel	Mexico (Guanajuato, Querétaro de Arteaga)
	Stenocactus phyllacanthus (Mart. ex A.Dietr. & Otto) A.Berger	Mexico (Guanajuato, Hidalgo, San Luis Potosí, Zacatecas)
	Stenocactus sulphureus (A.Dietr.) Bravo	Mexico (Hidalgo)
	Stenocactus vaupelianus (Werderm.) Backeb. & F.M.Knuth	Mexico (Hidalgo)

Two further species, S. hastatus and S. rectispinus, are of uncertain status.

Stenocactus × irregularis, a natural hybrid between Stenocactus coptonogonus and Stenocactus obvallatus, occurs in Guanajuato.
