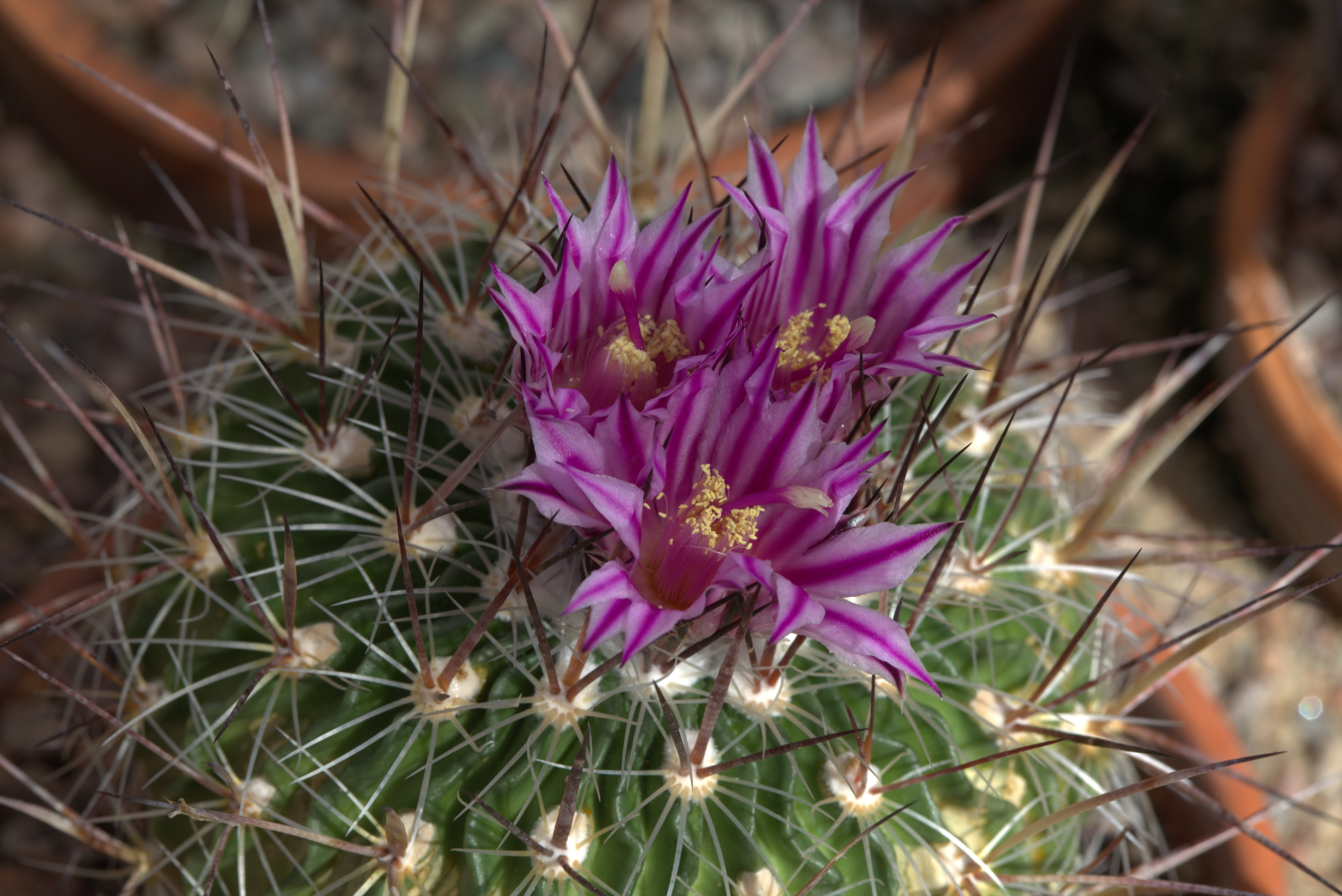

Conservation status
- Data Deficient (IUCN 3.1)

Scientific classification
- Kingdom: Plantae
- Clade: Embryophytes
- Clade: Tracheophytes
- Clade: Angiosperms
- Clade: Eudicots
- Order: Caryophyllales
- Family: Cactaceae
- Subfamily: Cactoideae
- Genus: Stenocactus
- Species: S. ochoterenianus

Binomial name
- Stenocactus ochoterenianus Tiegel

Synonyms
- List: Homotypic Synonyms; Echinofossulocactus boedekerianus f. ochoterenianus (Tiegel) P.V.Heath in Calyx 2: 86 (1992); Echinofossulocactus ochoterenianus (Tiegel) Whitmore in Cact. Succ. J. (Los Angeles) 5: 589 (1934) Heterotypic Synonyms; Brittonrosea heteracantha (Muehlenpf.) Speg. in Anales Soc. Ci. Argent. 96: 69 (1923); Echinocactus heteracanthus Muehlenpf. in Allg. Gartenzeitung 13: 345 (1845); Echinocactus tetraxiphus Otto ex K.Schum. in Gesamtbeschr. Kakt.: 363 (1898); Echinofossulocactus boedekerianus f. densispinus (Tiegel ex Pechanek) P.V.Heath in Calyx 2: 86 (1992); Echinofossulocactus boedekerianus f. parksianus (C.Schmoll ex Pechanek) P.V.Heath in Calyx 2: 86 (1992); Echinofossulocactus boedekerianus f. rosasianus (Whitmore ex Pechanek) P.V.Heath in Calyx 2: 86 (1992); Echinofossulocactus bustamantei (Bravo) Croizat in Cact. Succ. J. (Los Angeles) 14: 111 (1942), not validly publ.; Echinofossulocactus crispatus f. heteracanthus (Muehlenpf.) P.V.Heath in Calyx 2: 86 (1992); Echinofossulocactus densispinus Tiegel ex Pechanek in Cactus (Antwerp) 3: 132 (1971); Echinofossulocactus densispinus Schmoll in Cact. Succ. J. (Los Angeles) 6: 37 (1934), nom. nud.; Echinofossulocactus heteracanthus (Muehlenpf.) Britton & Rose in Cact. 3: 112 (1922); Echinofossulocactus lexarzae (Bravo) Croizat in Cact. Succ. J. (Los Angeles) 14: 111 (1942), not validly publ.; Echinofossulocactus parksianusWhitmore ex Schmoll in Cact. Succ. J. (Los Angeles) 6: 37 (1934); Echinofossulocactus parksianus C.Schmoll ex Pechanek in Cactus (Antwerp) 3: 130 (1971); Echinofossulocactus rosasianus Whitmore ex Schmoll in Cact. Succ. J. (Los Angeles) 6: 37 (1934); Echinofossulocactus rosasianus Whitmore ex Pechanek in Cactus (Antwerp) 3: 131 (1971); Echinofossulocactus tetraxiphus (Otto ex K.Schum.) Oehme in Beitr. Sukkulentenk. Sukkulentenpflege 1938: 82 (1938); Efossus heteracanthus (Muehlenpf.) Orcutt in Cactography: 5 (1926); Stenocactus bustamantei Bravo & Miranda in Anales Inst. Biol. Univ. Nac. México 15: 424 (1944); Stenocactus bustamantei Bravo in Cact. Mexic.: 404 (1937), no Latin descr.; Stenocactus heteracanthus {au; (Muehlenpf.) A.Berger in Kakteen: 346 (1929); Stenocactus lexarzae Bravo in Cact. Mexic.: 400 (1937), no Latin descr.; Stenocactus lexarzae Bravo & Miranda in Anales Inst. Biol. Univ. Nac. México 15: 423 (1944); Stenocactus tetraxiphus (Otto ex K.Schum.) A.Berger in Kakteen: 346 (1929)

= Stenocactus ochoterenianus =

Species of cactus

Stenocactus ochoterenianus is a species of cactus native to the deserts of Mexico.

== Description ==
Stenocactus ochoterenianus grows singly with depressed, spherical, bluish-green ribs and reaches a height of up to 8 cm (3.1 in) with a diameter of up to 10 cm (3.9 in). The approximately 30 narrow ribs are wavy and widened by the yellowish areoles . The four flat and wide central spines are yellow and become straw-colored with age. The upper ones are 5–6 cm (2.0–2.4 in) long and 2 mm (0.079 in) wide. The 22 or more needle-shaped radial spines are white. They are all the same length, up to 1.2 cm (0.47 in). The plant body is often obscured by the spination. The flowers are pale pink or pale greenish yellow, 2.5 cm (0.98 in) long. The spherical fruits are greenish with white scales.

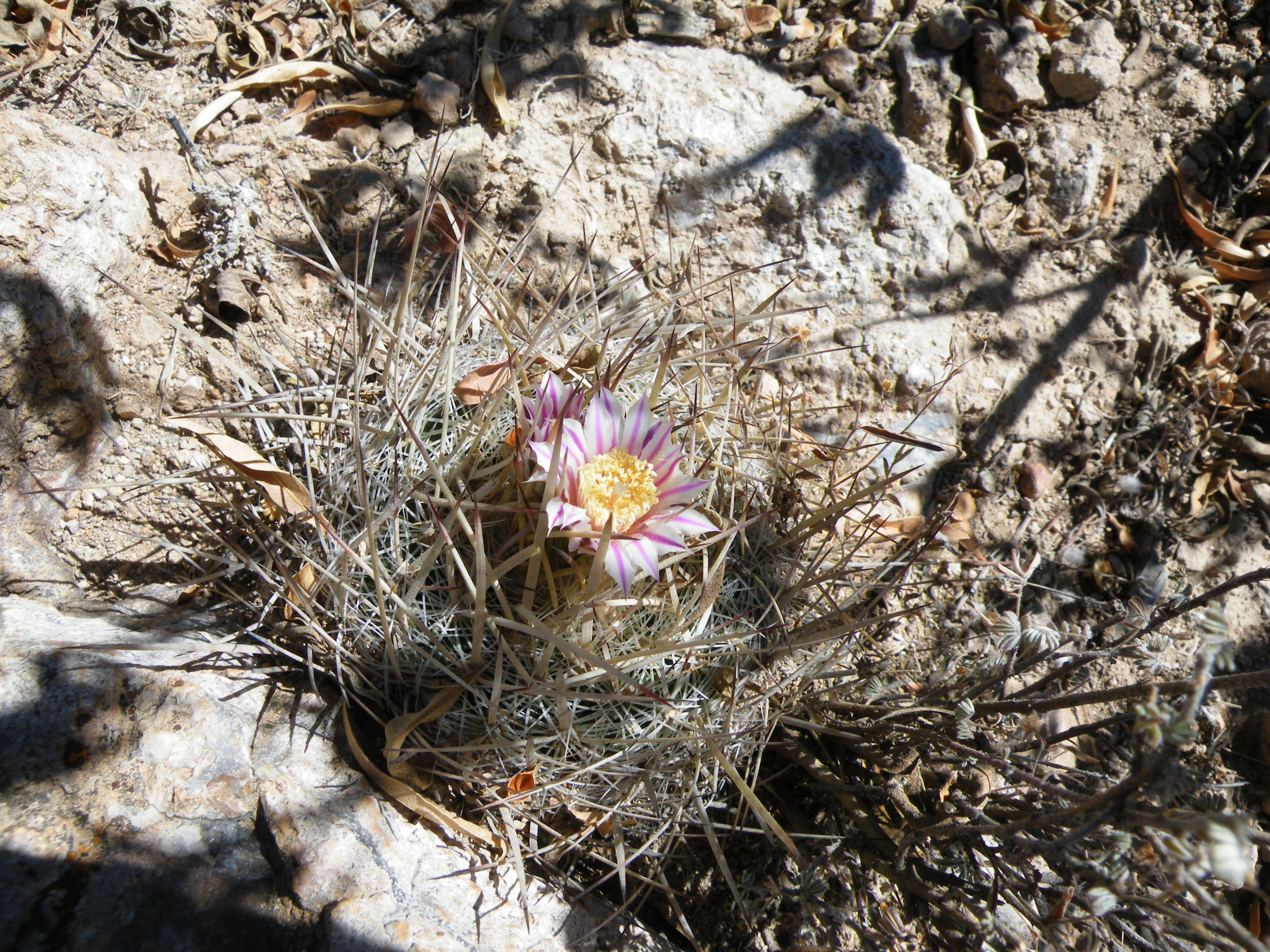

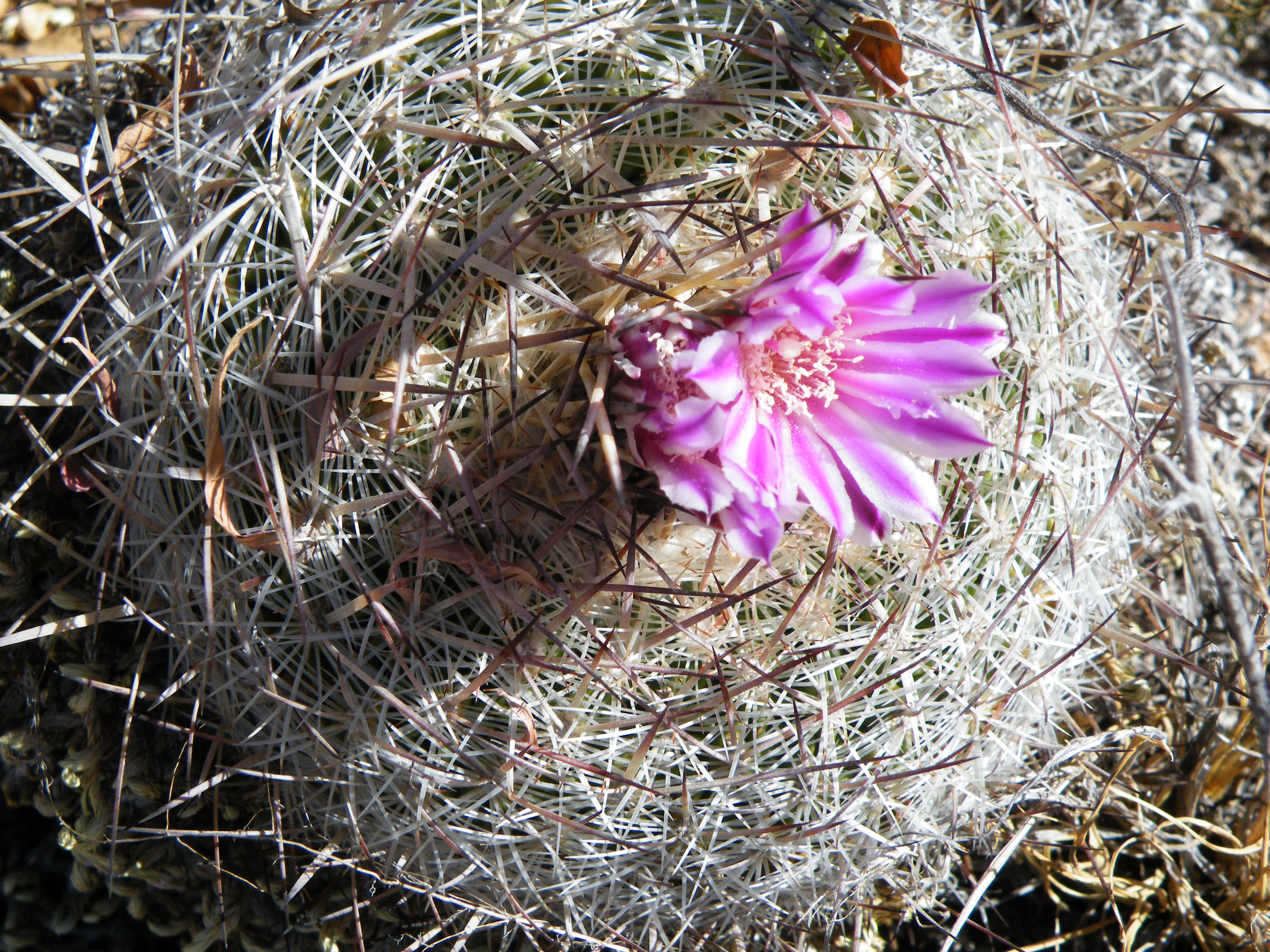

== Distribution ==
Stenocactus ochoterenianus is endemic to Mexico where it is found in the states of Queretaro and Guanajuato. It has also been reported in Hidalgo, Jalisco, Aguascalientes, Zacatecas and San Luis Potosí.
