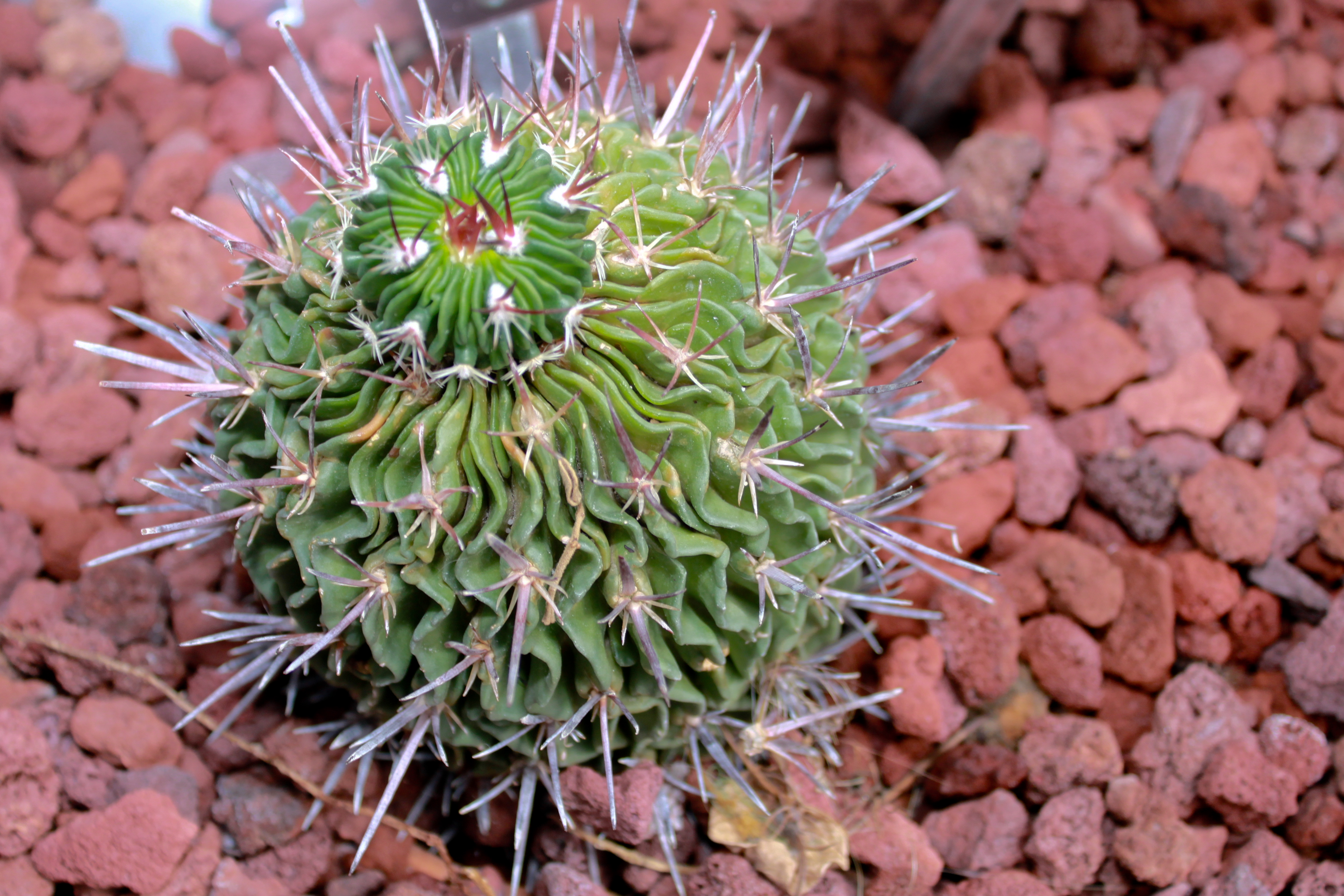
- Stenocactus multicostatus

Scientific classification
- Kingdom: Plantae
- Clade: Embryophytes
- Clade: Tracheophytes
- Clade: Angiosperms
- Clade: Eudicots
- Order: Caryophyllales
- Family: Cactaceae
- Subfamily: Cactoideae
- Genus: Stenocactus
- Species: S. multicostatus

Binomial name
- Stenocactus multicostatus (Daul) A.Berger

Synonyms
- List: Brittonrosea multicostata (Daul) Speg. 1923; Echinocactus multicostatus Daul 1890; Echinofossulocactus multicostatus (Daul) Britton & Rose 1922; Efossus multicostatus (Daul) Orcutt 1926; Brittonrosea lloydii (Britton & Rose) Speg. 1923; Brittonrosea zacatecasensis (Britton & Rose) Speg. 1923; Echinocactus lloydii (Britton & Rose) A.Berger 1929; Echinocactus multicostatus Rebut 1886; Echinocactus zacatecasensis A.Berger 1929; Echinofossulocactus erectocentrus Backeb. 1961; Echinofossulocactus lloydii Britton & Rose 1922; Echinofossulocactus multicostatus var. coahuilensis Frič 1931; Echinofossulocactus multicostatus f. erectocentrus (Backeb.) P.V.Heath 1992; Echinofossulocactus multicostatus f. lloydii (Britton & Rose) P.V.Heath 1992; Echinofossulocactus multicostatus f. zacatecasensis (Britton & Rose) P.V.Heath 1992; Echinofossulocactus multicostatus var. zacatecasensis (Britton & Rose) Lodé 1995; Echinofossulocactus zacatecasensis Britton & Rose 1922; Efossus lloydii (Britton & Rose) Orcutt 1926; Efossus zacatecasensis (Britton & Rose) Orcutt 1926; Stenocactus lloydii A.Berger 1929; Stenocactus multicostatus subsp. zacatecasensis (Britton & Rose) U.Guzmán & Vázq.-Ben. 2003; Stenocactus zacatecasensis (A.Berger) A.Berger 1929

= Stenocactus multicostatus =

Species of cactus

Stenocactus multicostatus, the brain cactus, is a member of the cactus family native to the deserts of Mexico, and is popular in the gardening community. It has gained the Royal Horticultural Society's Award of Garden Merit.

== Description ==
It grows single a plant body that is spherical to somewhat cylindrical up to 6 cm (2.4 in) tall and 6–10 cm (2.4–3.9 in) wide. It has no fewer than 120 very thin, sharp-edged, pressed, wavy ribs, between which there are narrow furrows. It has nearly 100 thin ribs around the outside, each with six to nine spines. Three white, papery, curved central spines arise from the areole, which are up to 3 centimeters long and have a square cross-section. The four marginal spines are glassy white, upright or slightly curved. In some plants there can be as many as 144 ribs, with the highest phyllotaxis (55/144) of any cactus. The crown is covered by a thin, whitish wool. The upper spines are wider, at 4–8 cm (1.6–3.1 in) long, while the lower ones are shorter, at 5–15 mm (0.20–0.59 in) long. The flower is white to purple, 2–5 cm (0.79–1.97 in) diameter with many stamens. The scales of the ovary are broadly ovoid, pointed to pointed, very thin, more or less papery and fall off early.

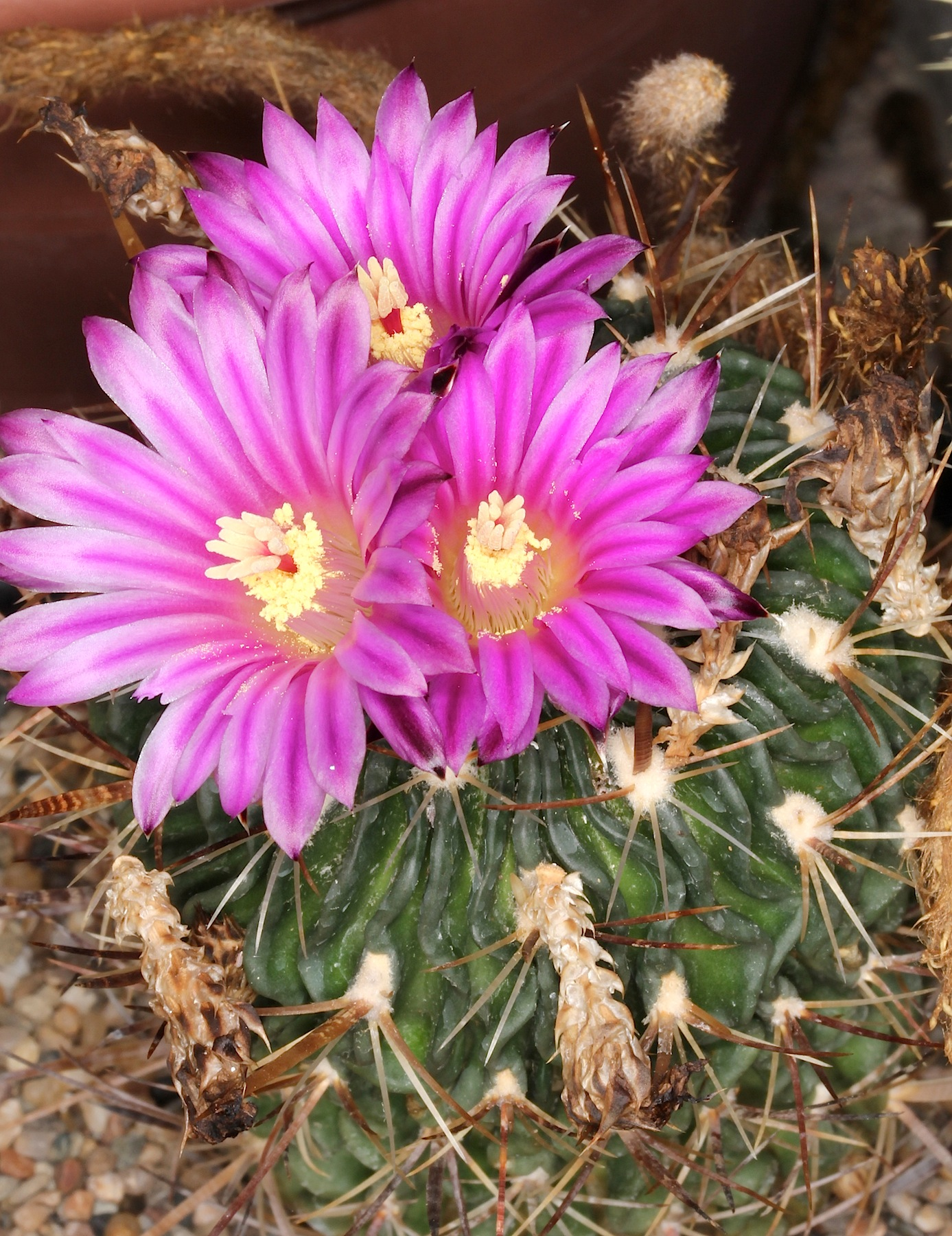
Brain cactus in bloom

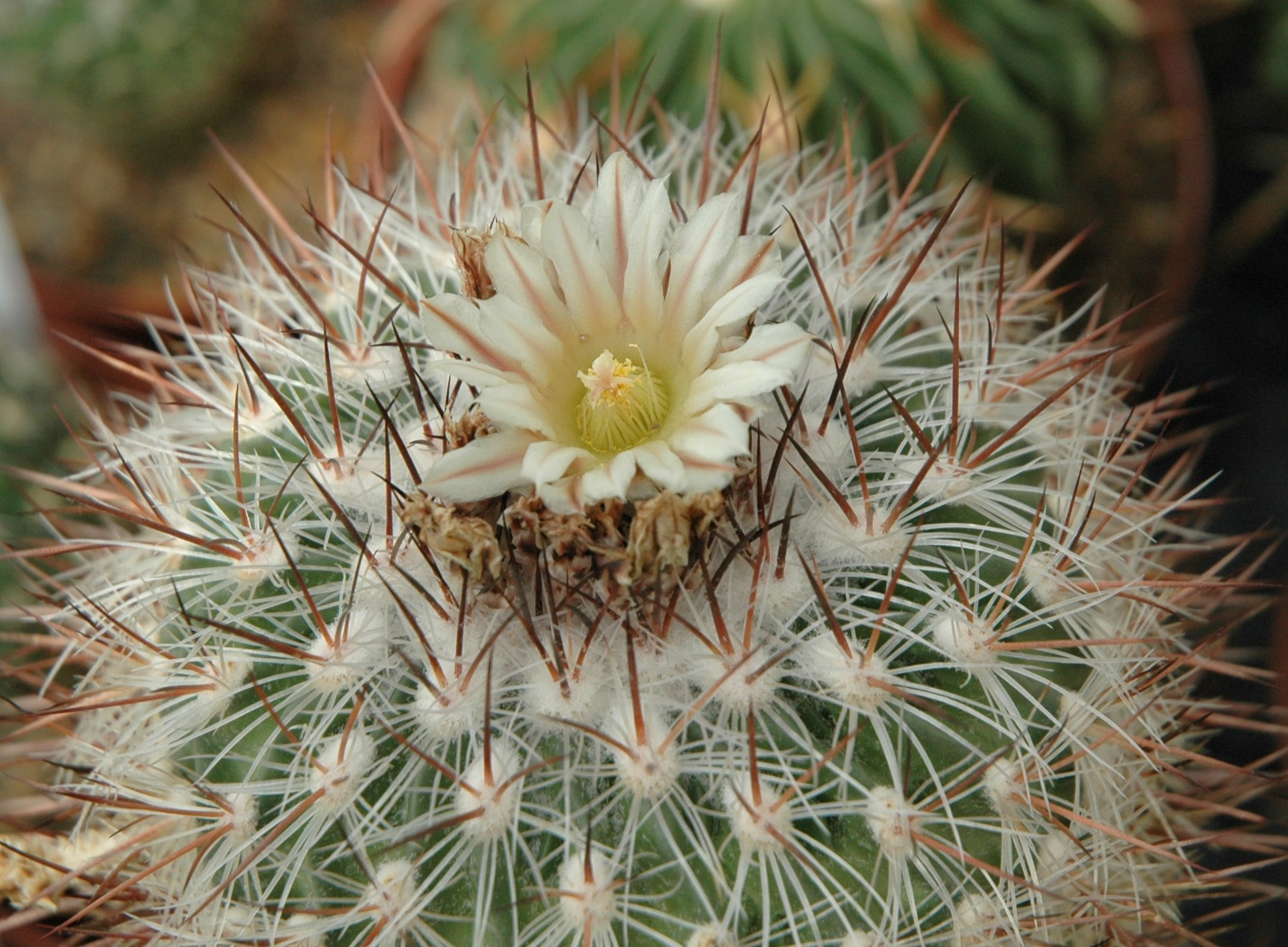
White flower

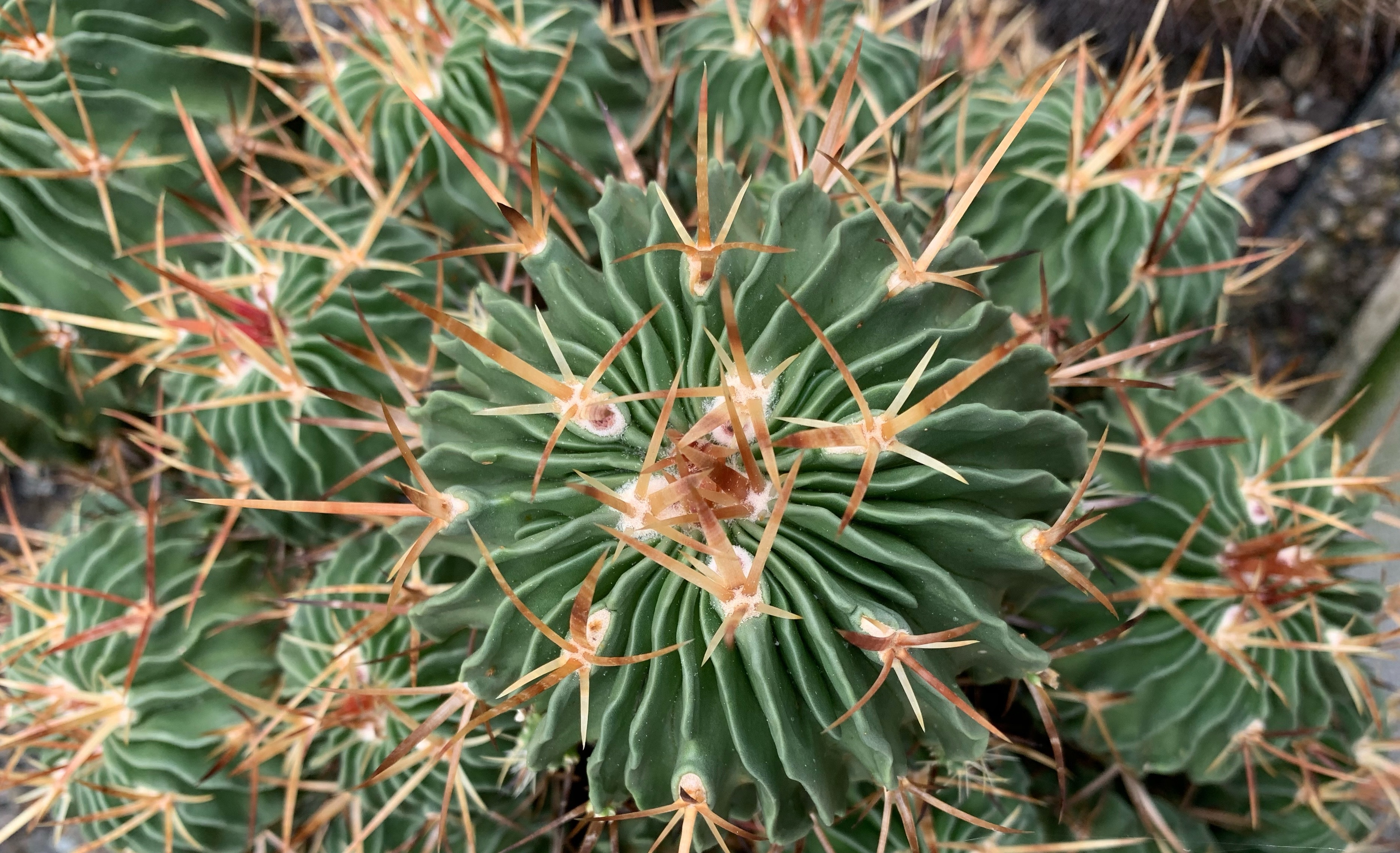
Plant

== Distribution ==
Though it has only been reported in the shrublands of Chihuahua, Coahuila, Durango, Nuevo León, San Luis Potosí, Zacatecas, and Tamaulipas, it has yet to be assessed using the IUCN Categories and Criteria because its taxonomy is still unclear.

== Taxonomy ==
Two subspecies are accepted:

- Stenocactus multicostatus subsp. multicostatus
- Stenocactus multicostatus subsp. zacatecasensis (Britton & Rose) U.Guzmán & Vázq.-Ben.

The first mention as Echinocactus multicostatus comes from 1890. Nathaniel Lord Britton and Joseph Nelson Rose assigned Echinocactus multicostatus as Echinofossulocactus multicostatus to the genus Echinofossulocactus, which they newly established in 1922. At the same time they published the first description of two species collected by Francis Ernest Lloyd (1868–1947). Echinofossulocactus lloydii from Zacatecas and Echinofossulocactus zacatecasensis from northern Zacatecas are now considered synonyms. In 1929, Alwin Berger placed the species described by Britton and Rose in Illustrated Handbooks of Succulent Plants: Cacti in the genus Stenocactus. Another synonym Echinofossulocactus erectocentrus was published invalidly by Curt Backeberg in 1961.
