= Cope's black-striped snake =

There are two species of snake named Cope's black-striped snake:

- Coniophanes piceivittis
- Coniophanes taeniata
