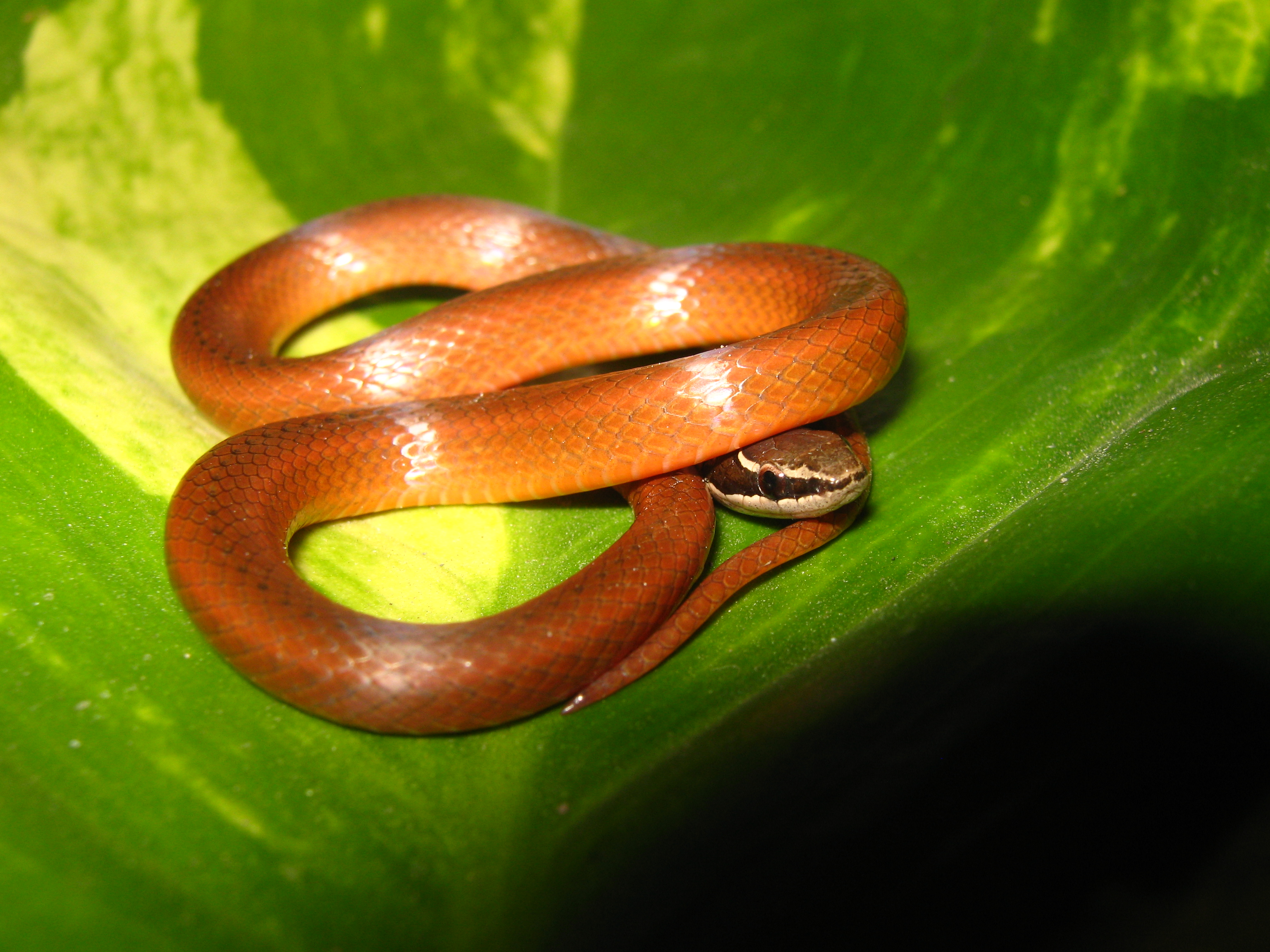

Conservation status
- Least Concern (IUCN 3.1)

Scientific classification
- Kingdom: Animalia
- Phylum: Chordata
- Class: Reptilia
- Order: Squamata
- Suborder: Serpentes
- Family: Colubridae
- Genus: Coniophanes
- Species: C. meridanus

Binomial name
- Coniophanes meridanus Schmidt & Andrews, 1936
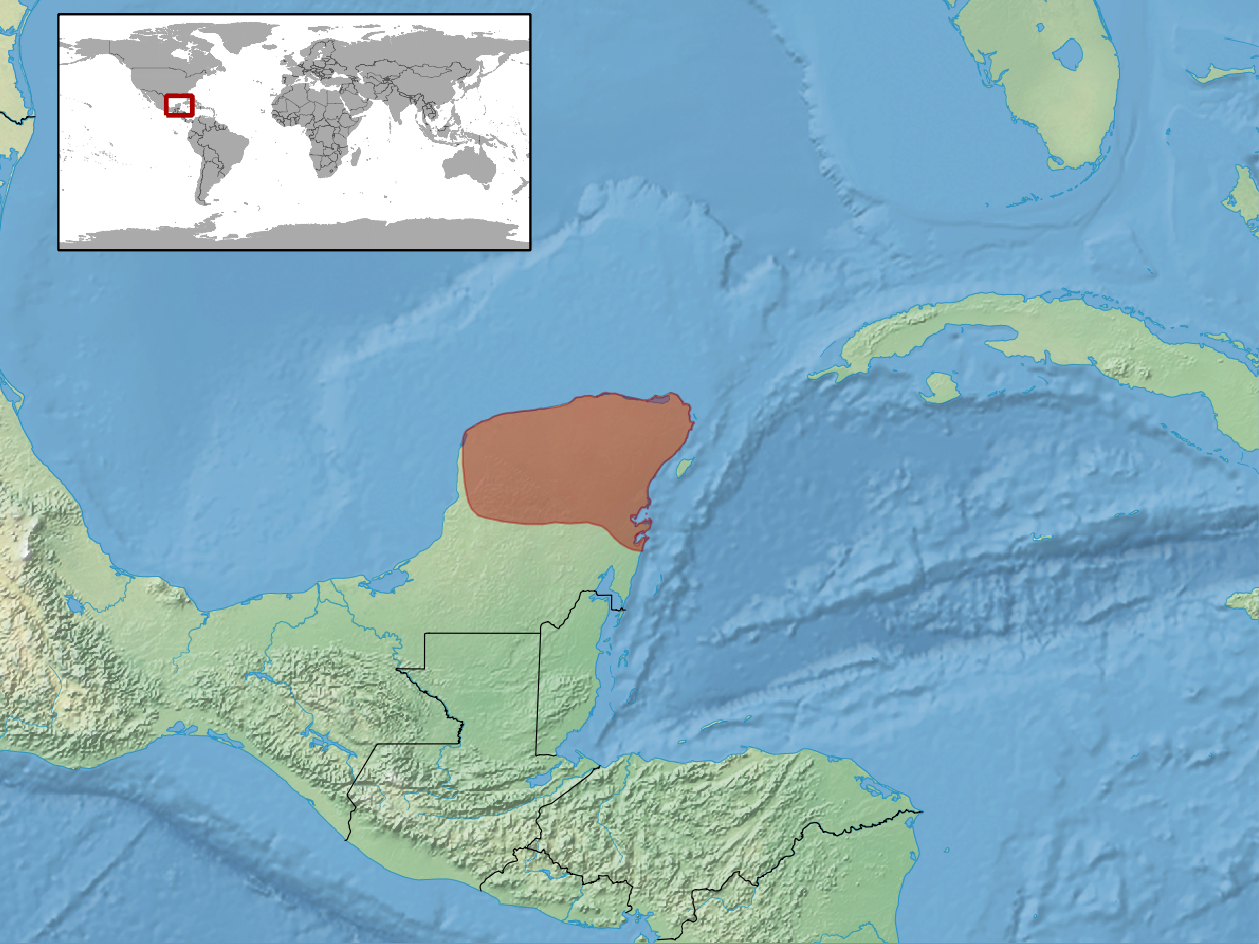

= Coniophanes meridanus =

Species of snake

Coniophanes meridanus, the peninsula stripeless snake, is a species of snake in the family Colubridae. The species is native to Mexico.
