= Coniophanes dromiciformis =

Conservation status
- Vulnerable (IUCN 3.1)

Scientific classification
- Kingdom: Animalia
- Phylum: Chordata
- Class: Reptilia
- Order: Squamata
- Suborder: Serpentes
- Family: Colubridae
- Genus: Coniophanes
- Species: C. dromiciformis

Binomial name
- Coniophanes dromiciformis (Peters, 1863)
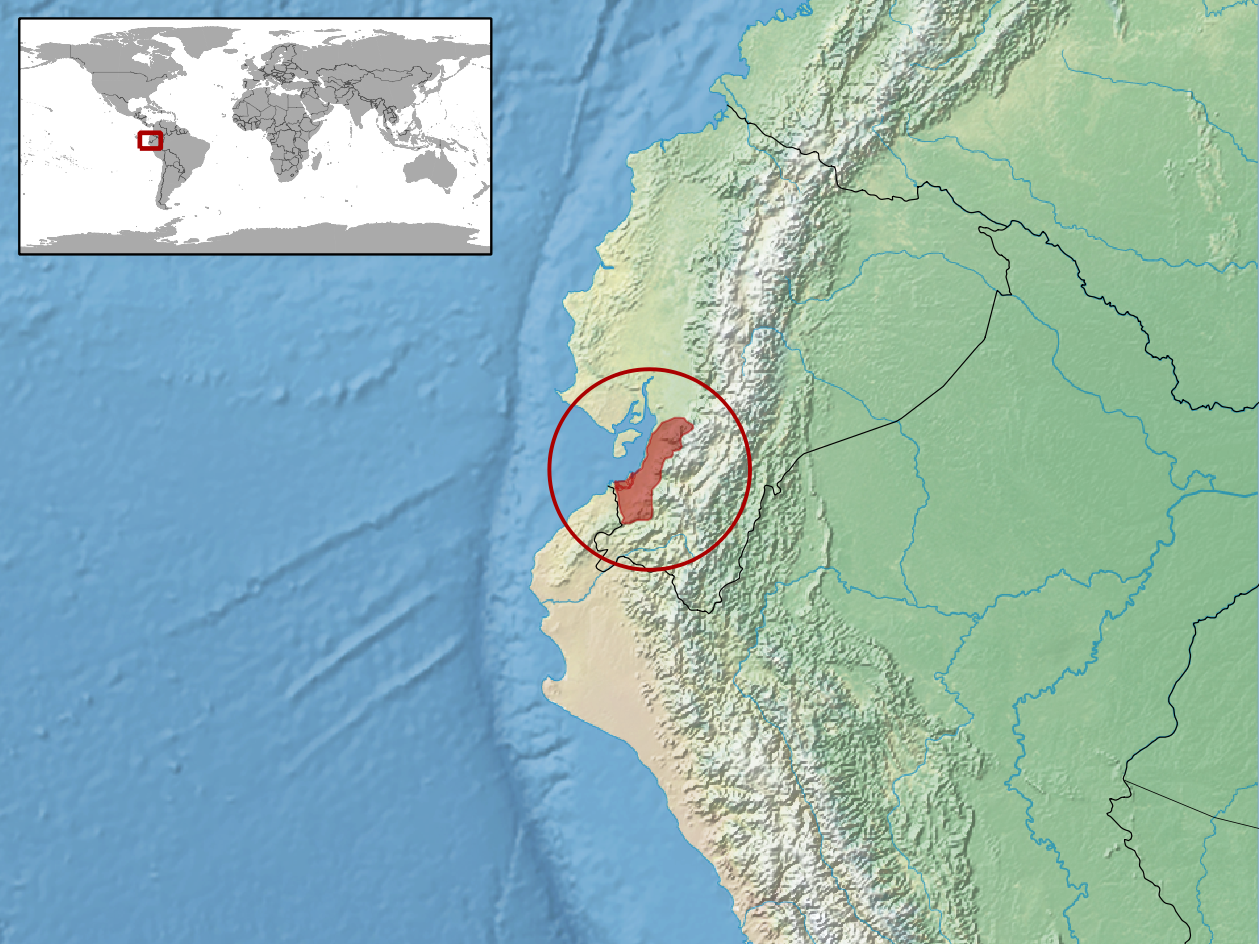

Species of snake

Coniophanes dromiciformis, Peters's running snake, is a species of snake in the family Colubridae. The species is native to Ecuador and Peru.
