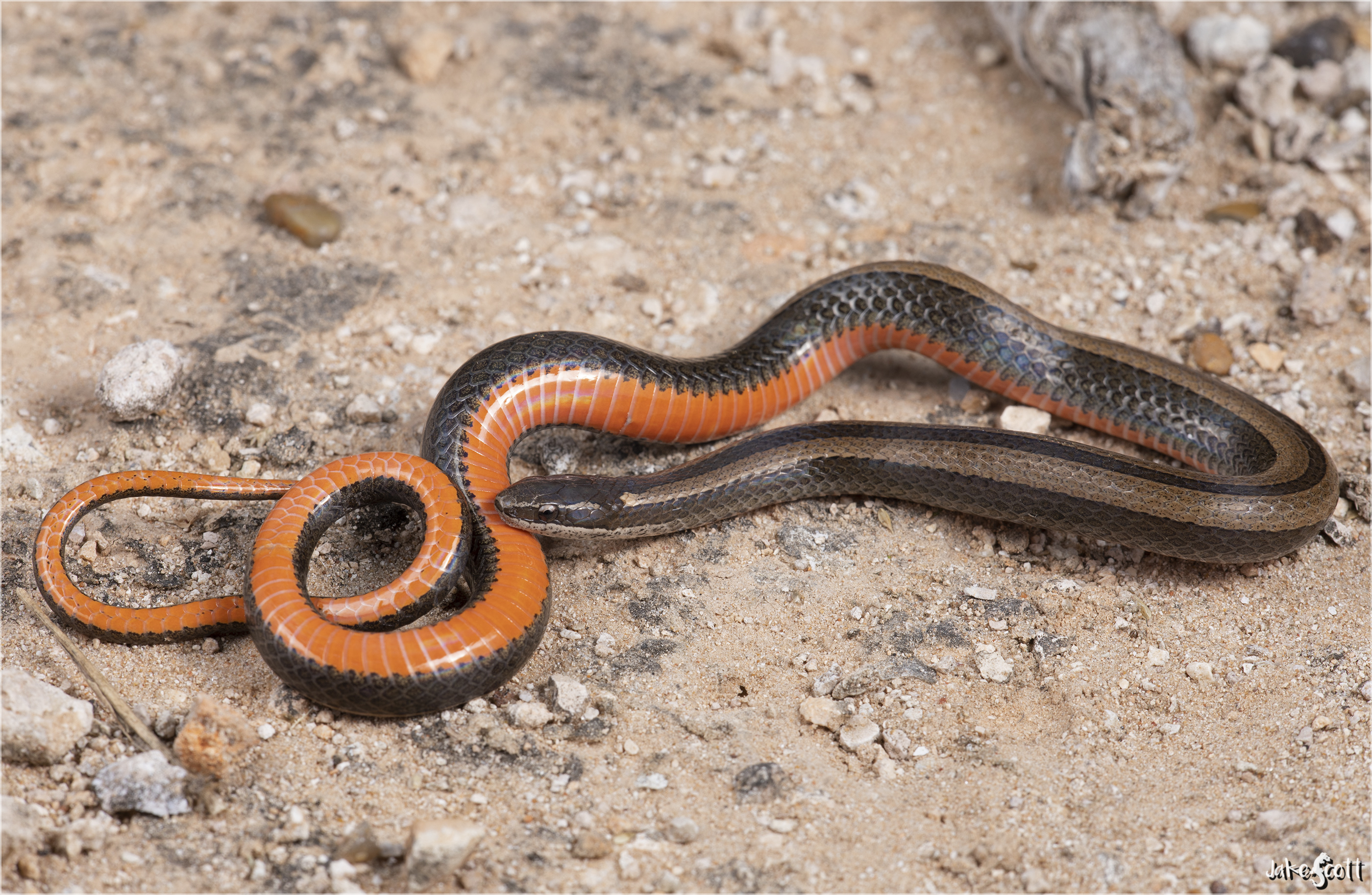

Conservation status
- Least Concern (IUCN 3.1)

Scientific classification
- Kingdom: Animalia
- Phylum: Chordata
- Class: Reptilia
- Order: Squamata
- Suborder: Serpentes
- Family: Colubridae
- Genus: Coniophanes
- Species: C. imperialis

Binomial name
- Coniophanes imperialis (Baird & Girard, 1859)
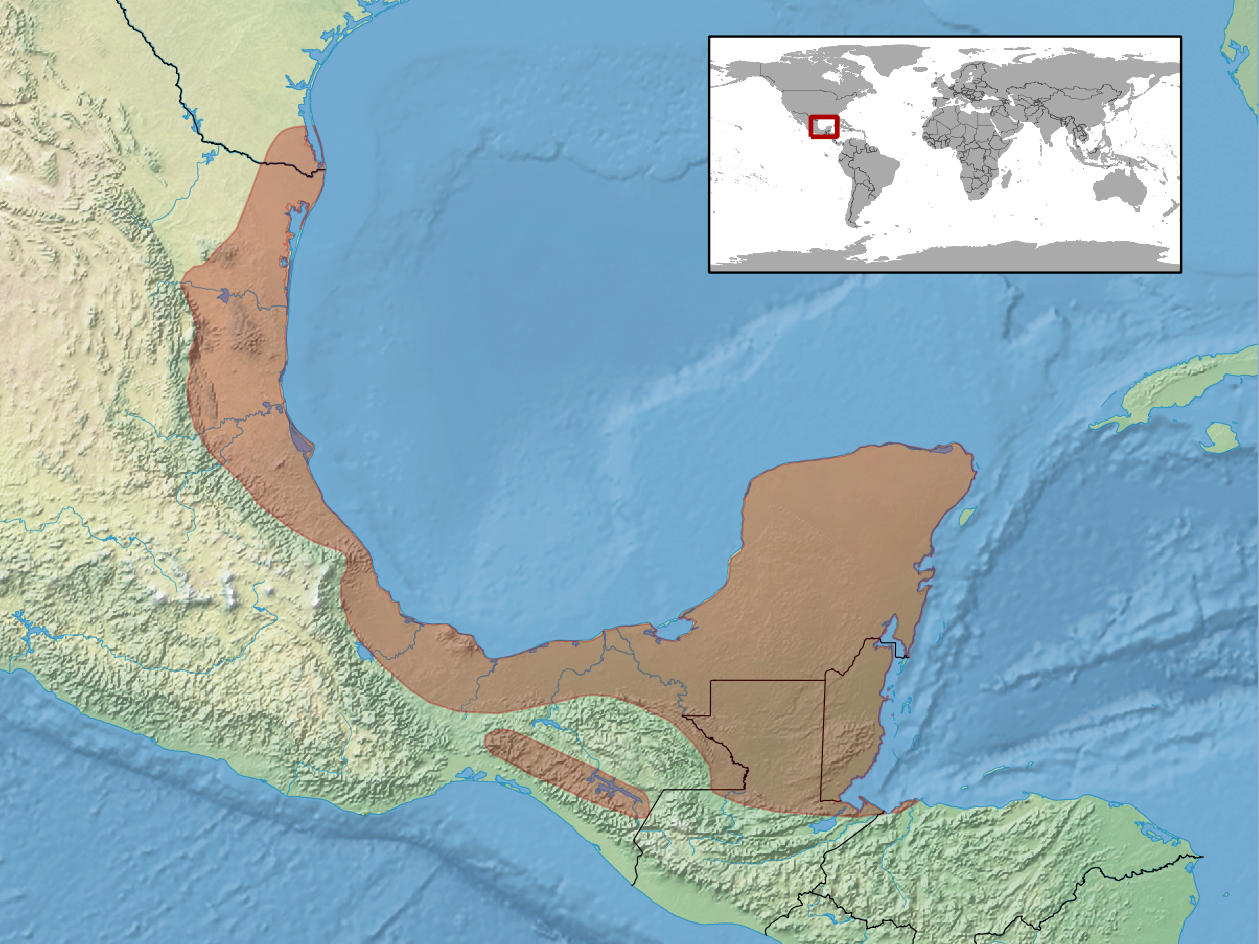

= Coniophanes imperialis =

Species of snake

Coniophanes imperialis, the black-striped snake, is a species of snake in the family Colubridae. The species is native to Texas in the United States, Mexico, Guatemala, Honduras, and Belize.
