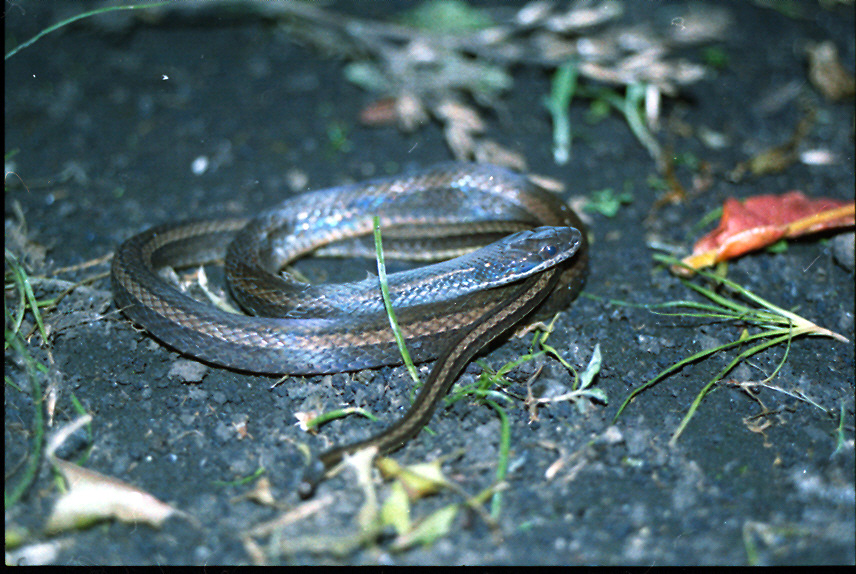

Conservation status
- Least Concern (IUCN 3.1)

Scientific classification
- Kingdom: Animalia
- Phylum: Chordata
- Class: Reptilia
- Order: Squamata
- Suborder: Serpentes
- Family: Colubridae
- Genus: Coniophanes
- Species: C. fissidens

Binomial name
- Coniophanes fissidens (Günther, 1858)

= Coniophanes fissidens =

Species of snake

Coniophanes fissidens, the yellowbelly snake, is a species of snake in the family Colubridae. The species is native to Mexico, Guatemala, Honduras, Belize, Nicaragua, El Salvador, Costa Rica, Panama, Ecuador, Peru, and Colombia.
