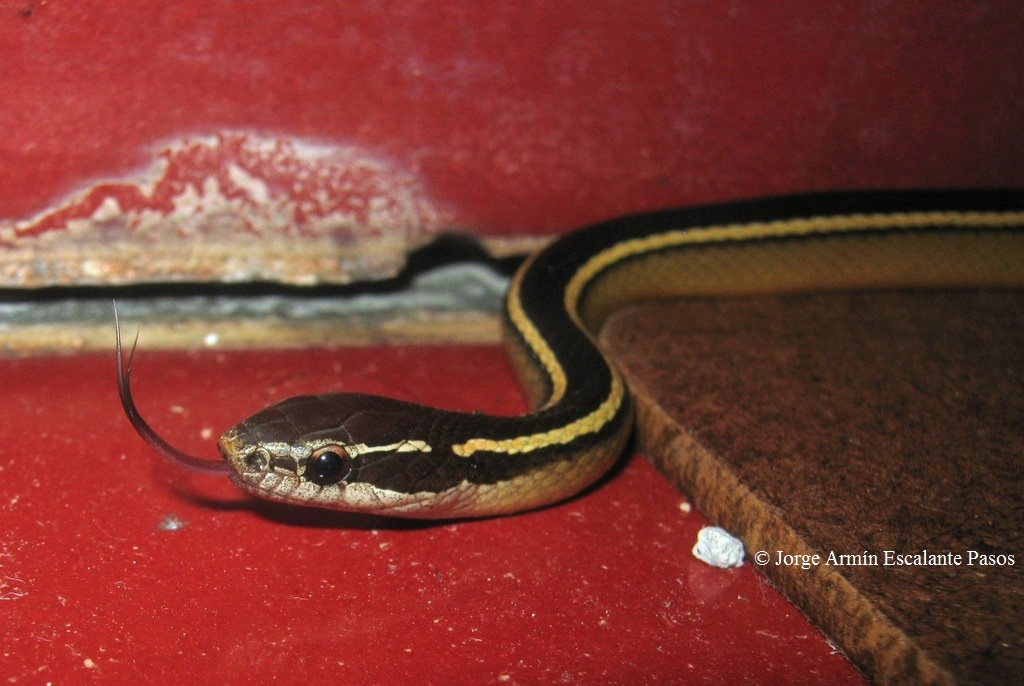

Conservation status
- Least Concern (IUCN 3.1)

Scientific classification
- Kingdom: Animalia
- Phylum: Chordata
- Class: Reptilia
- Order: Squamata
- Suborder: Serpentes
- Family: Colubridae
- Genus: Coniophanes
- Species: C. schmidti

Binomial name
- Coniophanes schmidti Bailey, 1937
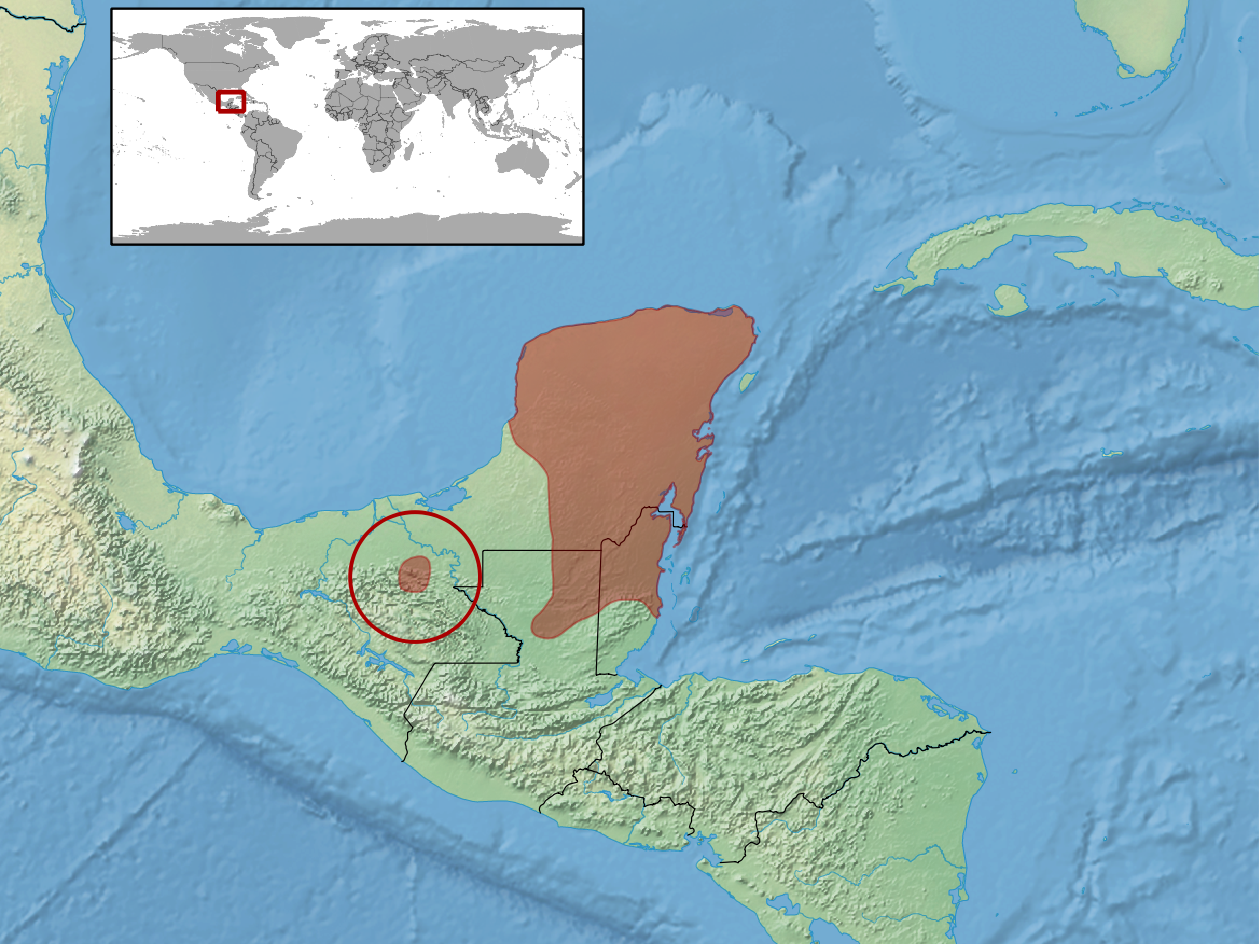

= Coniophanes schmidti =

Species of snake

Coniophanes schmidti, the faded black-striped snake, is a species of snake in the family Colubridae. The species is native to Mexico, Belize, and Guatemala.
