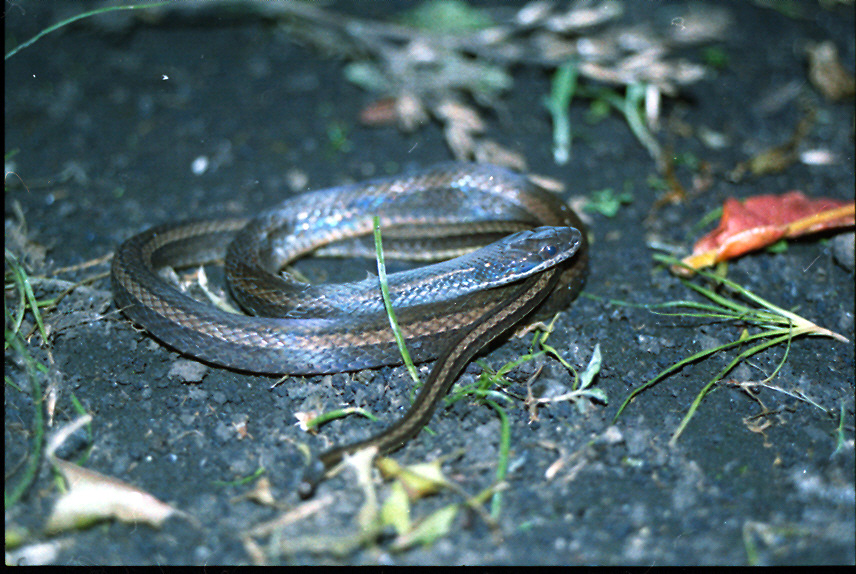
- Coniophanes fissidens

Scientific classification
- Kingdom: Animalia
- Phylum: Chordata
- Class: Reptilia
- Order: Squamata
- Suborder: Serpentes
- Family: Colubridae
- Subfamily: Dipsadinae
- Genus: Coniophanes; Hallowell, 1860

Synonyms
- Dromicus, Erythrolamprus, Glaphyrophis, Homalopsis, Hydrops, Rhadinaea, Tachymenis, Taeniophis

= Coniophanes =

Genus of snakes

Coniophanes is a genus of colubrid snakes, commonly referred to as black-striped snakes, but they also have many other common names. The genus consists of 17 species, and despite the common name, not all of them display striping.

== Geographic range ==
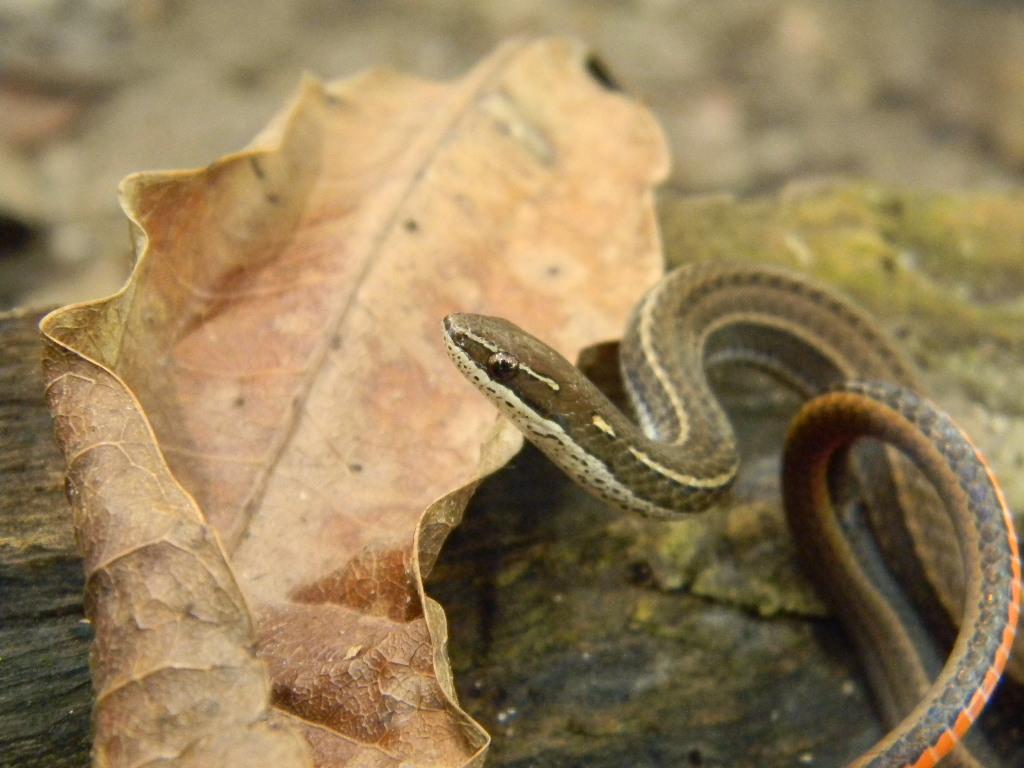
Black-striped snake (Coniophanes imperialis) from Playon de la Gloria, Marquez de Comillas, Chiapas, Mexico

Species of Coniophanes are found primarily in Mexico and Central America, but range as far north as southern Texas in the United States, and as far south as Peru in South America.

== Description ==
Snakes of the genus Coniophanes grow to a total length (including tail) of 31–46 cm (12–18 in) and are typically brown in color, with black striping down the sides and center of the back, and a red or orange underside. Some of the species, such as C. alvarezi, are solid brown.

== Habitat and behavior ==
Coniophanes snakes are secretive burrowers. They spend most of their time digging into loose soils, forest leaf litter, or under rotting cactus. They live in humid or forested regions. They are nocturnal, emerging from their underground retreats in the late evening to feed on frogs, lizards, small rodents, and smaller snakes.

== Reproduction ==
Species in the genus Coniophanes are oviparous, laying clutches of up to 10 eggs in loose soil. The eggs hatch in around 40 days, depending on relative temperature and humidity. Hatchlings are about 17 cm (6.5 in) in length.

== Species ==
The following 17 species are recognized as being valid.

- C. alvarezi Campbell, 1989 – Chiapan stripeless snake – Mexico
- C. andresensis Bailey, 1937 – Isla San Andrés snake – Isla San Andrés, Colombia
- C. bipunctatus (Günther, 1858) – two-spotted snake – Mexico, Guatemala, Honduras, Belize, Nicaragua, Panama, El Salvador, and Costa Rica
  - C. b. bipunctatus (Günther, 1858)
  - C. b. biseriatus H.M. Smith, 1940
- C. dromiciformis (W. Peters, 1863) – Peters' running snake – Ecuador and Peru
- C. fissidens (Günther, 1858) – yellowbelly snake – Mexico, Belize, Guatemala, Honduras, El Salvador, Nicaragua, Costa Rica, Panama, Ecuador, Peru, and Colombia
  - C. f. convergens Shannon & H.M. Smith, 1950
  - C. f. dispersus H.M. Smith, 1941
  - C. f. fissidens (Günther, 1858)
  - C. f. proterops (Cope, 1860)
  - C. f. punctigularis (Cope, 1860)
- C. imperialis (Baird & Girard, 1859) – black-striped snake – United States (Texas), Mexico, Belize, Guatemala, and Honduras
  - C. i. imperialis (Baird & Girard, 1859)
  - C. i. clavatus (W. Peters, 1864)
  - C. i. copei Hartweg & Oliver, 1938
- C. joanae Myers, 1966 – Panama
- C. lateritius Cope, 1862 – stripeless snake – Mexico
- C. longinquus Cadle, 1989 – Ecuador, Peru
- C. melanocephalus (W. Peters, 1869) – Mexico
- C. meridanus Schmidt & Andrews, 1936 – peninsula stripeless snake – Mexico
- C. michoacanensis Flores-Villela & E.N. Smith, 2009 – Mexico
- C. piceivittis Cope, 1870 – Cope's black-striped snake – Mexico, Belize, Honduras, El Salvador, Nicaragua, and Costa Rica
  - C. p. frangivirgatus J. Peters, 1950
  - C. p. piceivittis Cope, 1870
- C. quinquevittatus (A.M.C. Duméril, Bibron & A.H.A. Duméril, 1854) – five-striped snake – Mexico and Guatemala
- C. schmidti Bailey, 1937 – faded black-striped snake – Mexico, Belize, and Guatemala.
- C. taeniata (W. Peters, 1870) – Cope's black-striped snake – Mexico
- C. taylori Hall, 1951 – Mexico

Nota bene: A binomial authority or trinomial authority in parentheses indicates that the species or subspecies was originally described in a genus other than Coniophanes.
