= Coniophanes bipunctatus =

Conservation status
- Least Concern (IUCN 3.1)

Scientific classification
- Kingdom: Animalia
- Phylum: Chordata
- Class: Reptilia
- Order: Squamata
- Suborder: Serpentes
- Family: Colubridae
- Genus: Coniophanes
- Species: C. bipunctatus

Binomial name
- Coniophanes bipunctatus (Günther, 1858)

Species of snake

Coniophanes bipunctatus, the two-spotted snake, is a species of snake in the family Colubridae. The species is native to Mexico, Guatemala, Honduras, Belize, Nicaragua, Costa Rica, and Panama.
