= Coniophanes joanae =

Conservation status
- Data Deficient (IUCN 3.1)

Scientific classification
- Kingdom: Animalia
- Phylum: Chordata
- Class: Reptilia
- Order: Squamata
- Suborder: Serpentes
- Family: Colubridae
- Genus: Coniophanes
- Species: C. joanae

Binomial name
- Coniophanes joanae Myers, 1966

Species of snake

Coniophanes joanae is a species of snake in the subfamily Dipsadinae of the family Colubridae. The species is endemic to Panama.

== Etymology ==
The specific name, joanae, is in honor of Joan Wilson Myers, the wife of the describer.

== Geographic range ==
C. joanae is found in eastern Panama.

== Habitat ==
The preferred natural habitat of C. joanae is forest, at altitudes of 600–1,400 m (2,000–4,600 ft).

== Description ==
C. joanae has only 17 rows of dorsal scales both at midbody and anteriorly.

== Behavior ==
C. joanae is diurnal, and despite being a forest-dwelling species, it is terrestrial, not arboreal.

== Reproduction ==
C. joanae is oviparous.
