= Coniophanes longinquus =

Conservation status
- Least Concern (IUCN 3.1)

Scientific classification
- Kingdom: Animalia
- Phylum: Chordata
- Class: Reptilia
- Order: Squamata
- Suborder: Serpentes
- Family: Colubridae
- Genus: Coniophanes
- Species: C. longinquus

Binomial name
- Coniophanes longinquus Cadle, 1989

Species of snake

Coniophanes longinquus is a species of snake in the family Colubridae. The species is native to Ecuador and Peru.
