= Coniophanes melanocephalus =

Conservation status
- Data Deficient (IUCN 3.1)

Scientific classification
- Kingdom: Animalia
- Phylum: Chordata
- Class: Reptilia
- Order: Squamata
- Suborder: Serpentes
- Family: Colubridae
- Genus: Coniophanes
- Species: C. melanocephalus

Binomial name
- Coniophanes melanocephalus (Peters, 1869)
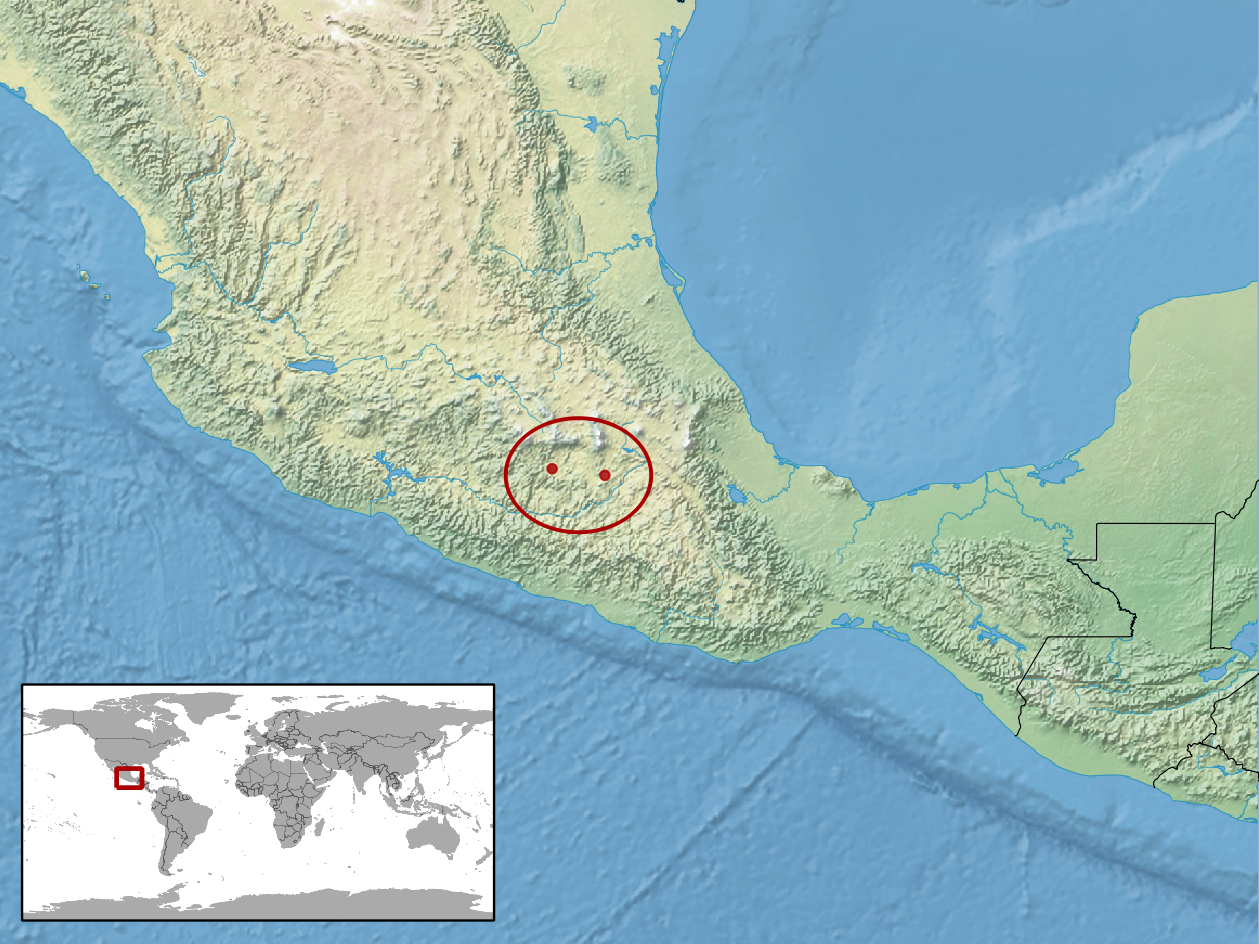

Species of snake

Coniophanes melanocephalus is a species of snake in the family Colubridae. The species is native to Mexico.
