= Coniophanes quinquevittatus =

Conservation status
- Least Concern (IUCN 3.1)

Scientific classification
- Kingdom: Animalia
- Phylum: Chordata
- Class: Reptilia
- Order: Squamata
- Suborder: Serpentes
- Family: Colubridae
- Genus: Coniophanes
- Species: C. quinquevittatus

Binomial name
- Coniophanes quinquevittatus (A.M.C. Duméril, Bibron, & A.H.A. Duméril, 1854)
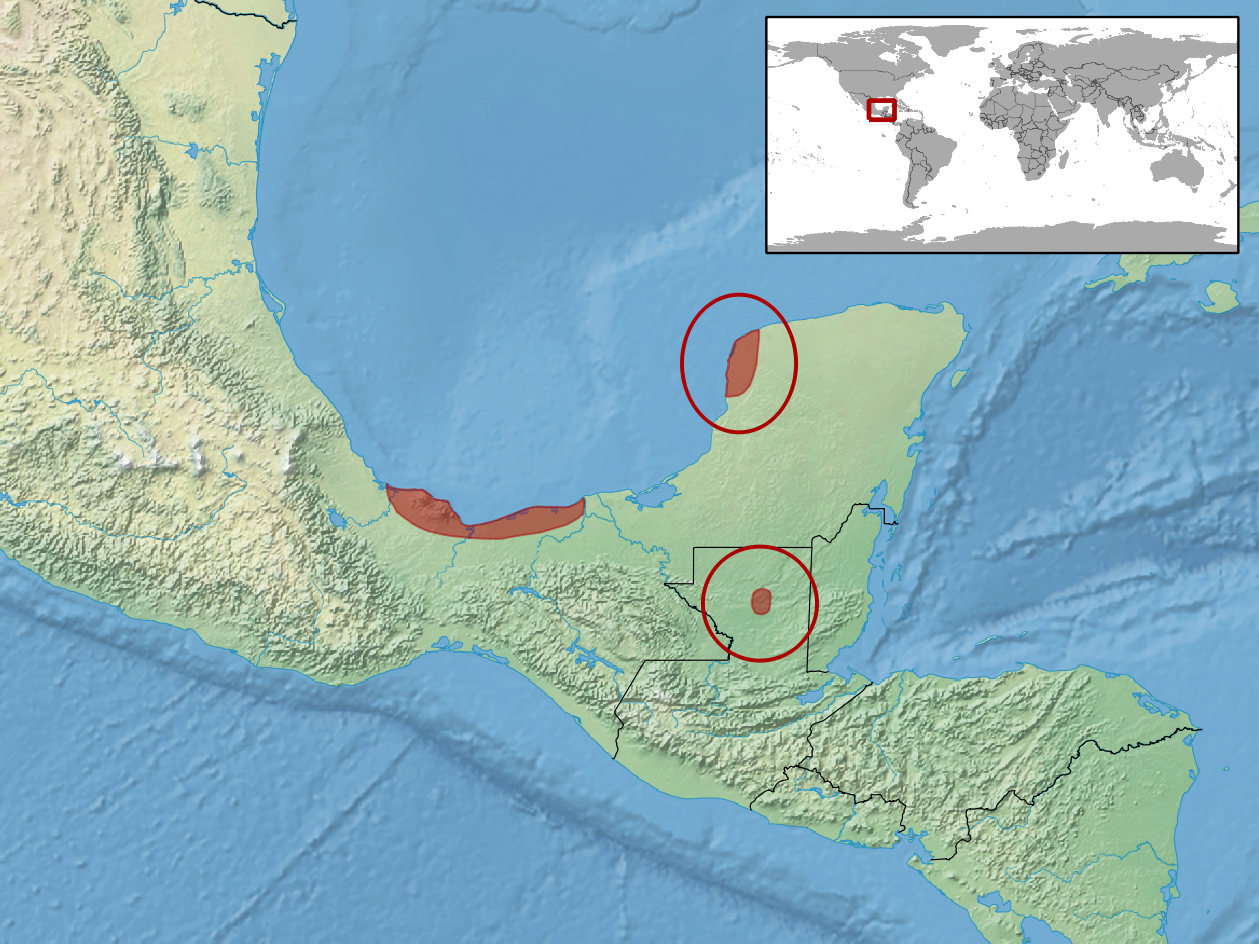

Species of snake

Coniophanes quinquevittatus, the five-striped snake, is a species of snake in the family Colubridae. The species is native to Mexico and Guatemala.
