= Coniophanes michoacanensis =

Scientific classification
- Kingdom: Animalia
- Phylum: Chordata
- Class: Reptilia
- Order: Squamata
- Suborder: Serpentes
- Family: Colubridae
- Genus: Coniophanes
- Species: C. michoacanensis

Binomial name
- Coniophanes michoacanensis Flores-Villela & E.N. Smith, 2009

Species of snake

Coniophanes michoacanensis is a species of snake in the family Colubridae. The species is native to Mexico.
