= Coniophanes andresensis =

Conservation status
- Critically Endangered (IUCN 3.1)

Scientific classification
- Kingdom: Animalia
- Phylum: Chordata
- Class: Reptilia
- Order: Squamata
- Suborder: Serpentes
- Family: Colubridae
- Genus: Coniophanes
- Species: C. andresensis

Binomial name
- Coniophanes andresensis Bailey, 1937

Species of snake

Coniophanes andresensis, the San Andres snake, is a species of snake in the family Colubridae. The species is native to San Andrés of Colombia.
