= Coniophanes taylori =

Scientific classification
- Kingdom: Animalia
- Phylum: Chordata
- Class: Reptilia
- Order: Squamata
- Suborder: Serpentes
- Family: Colubridae
- Genus: Coniophanes
- Species: C. taylori

Binomial name
- Coniophanes taylori Hall, 1951

Species of snake

Coniophanes taylori is a species of snake in the family Colubridae. The species is native to Mexico.
