= Coniophanes lateritius =

Conservation status
- Data Deficient (IUCN 3.1)

Scientific classification
- Kingdom: Animalia
- Phylum: Chordata
- Class: Reptilia
- Order: Squamata
- Suborder: Serpentes
- Family: Colubridae
- Genus: Coniophanes
- Species: C. lateritius

Binomial name
- Coniophanes lateritius Cope, 1862
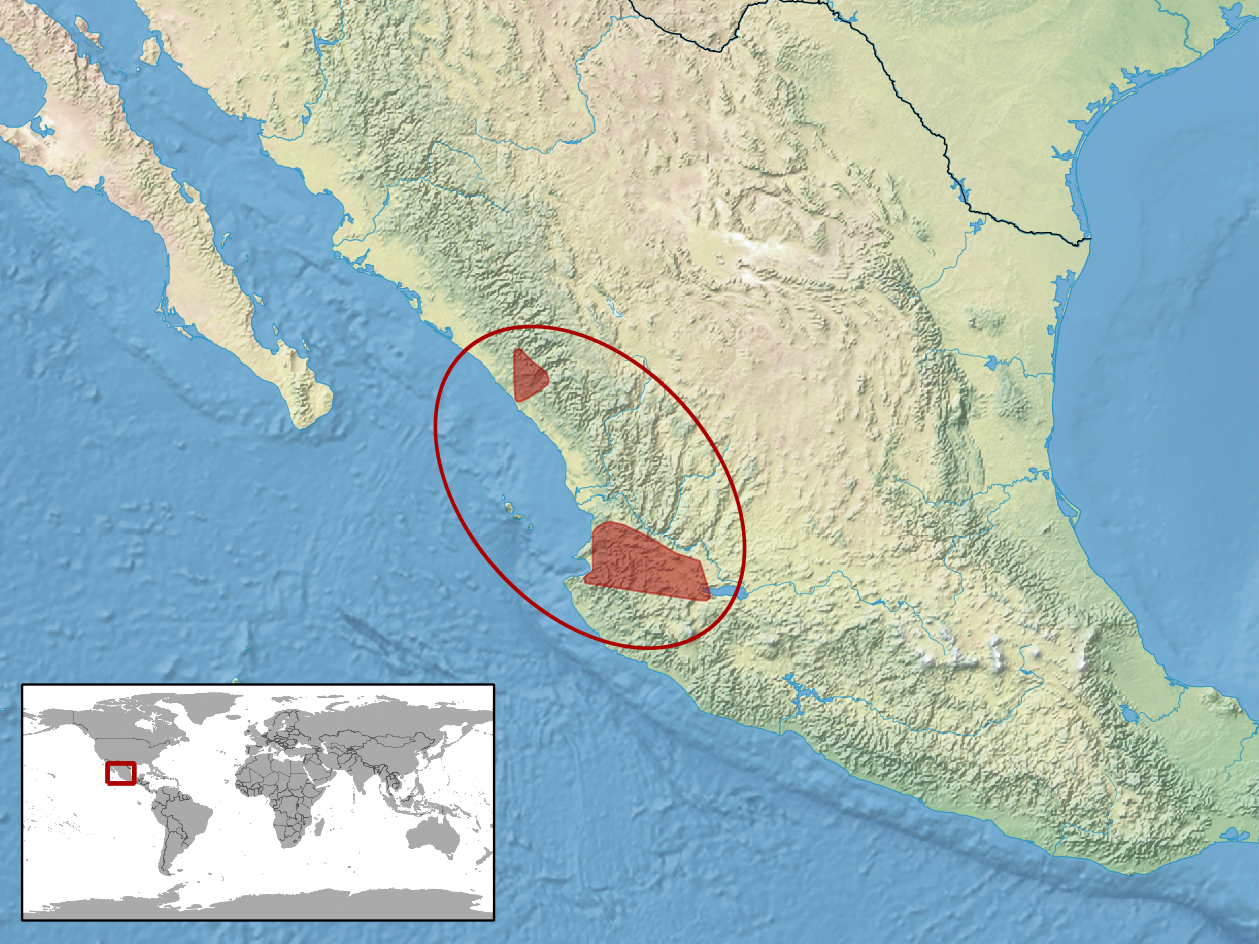

Species of snake

Coniophanes lateritius, the stripeless snake, is a species of snake in the family Colubridae. The species is native to Mexico.
