= Coniophanes taeniata =

Scientific classification
- Kingdom: Animalia
- Phylum: Chordata
- Class: Reptilia
- Order: Squamata
- Suborder: Serpentes
- Family: Colubridae
- Genus: Coniophanes
- Species: C. taeniata

Binomial name
- Coniophanes taeniata (Peters, 1870)

Species of snake

Coniophanes taeniata, Cope's black-striped snake, is a species of snake in the family Colubridae. The species is native to Mexico.
