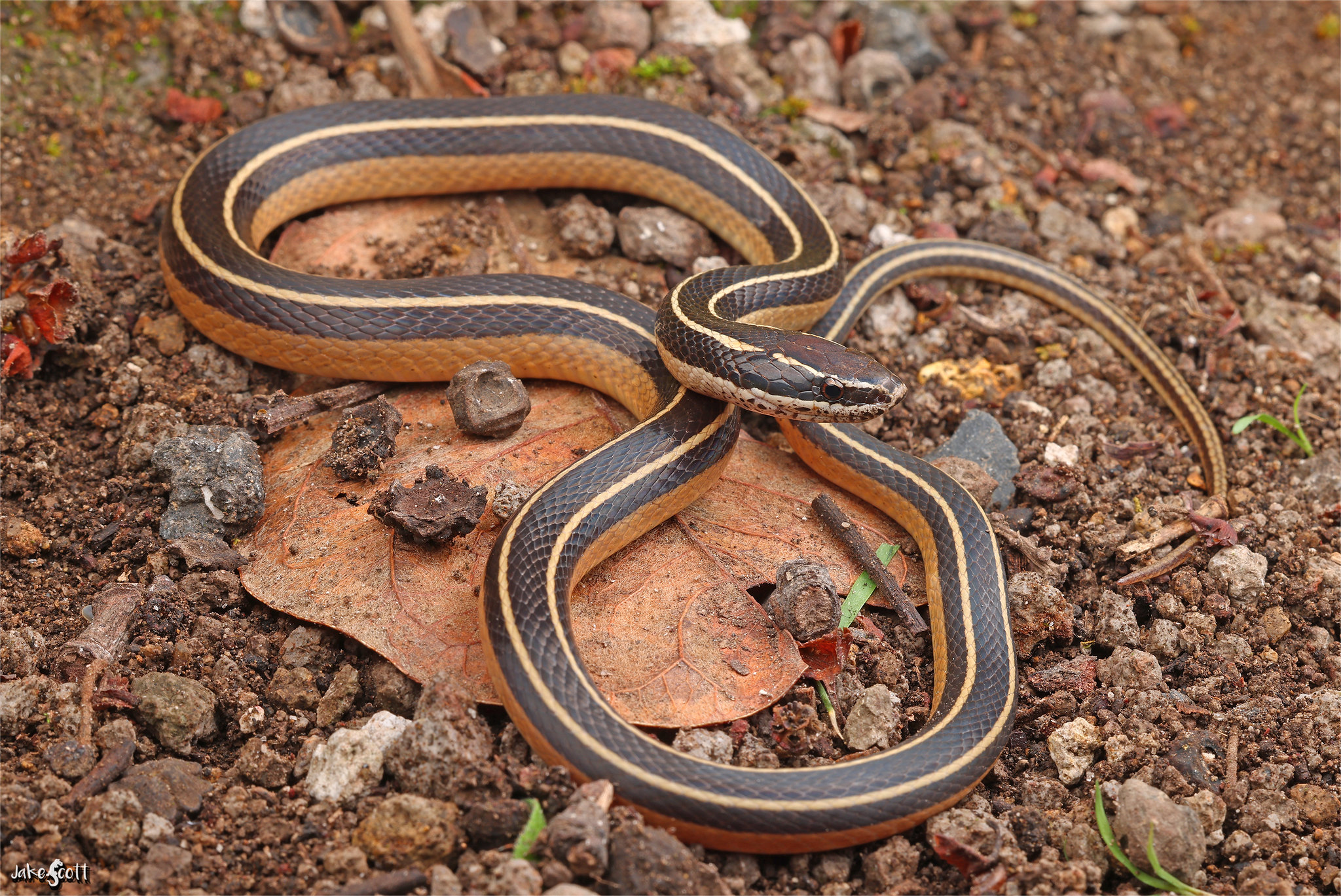

Conservation status
- Least Concern (IUCN 3.1)

Scientific classification
- Kingdom: Animalia
- Phylum: Chordata
- Class: Reptilia
- Order: Squamata
- Suborder: Serpentes
- Family: Colubridae
- Genus: Coniophanes
- Species: C. piceivittis

Binomial name
- Coniophanes piceivittis Cope, 1869
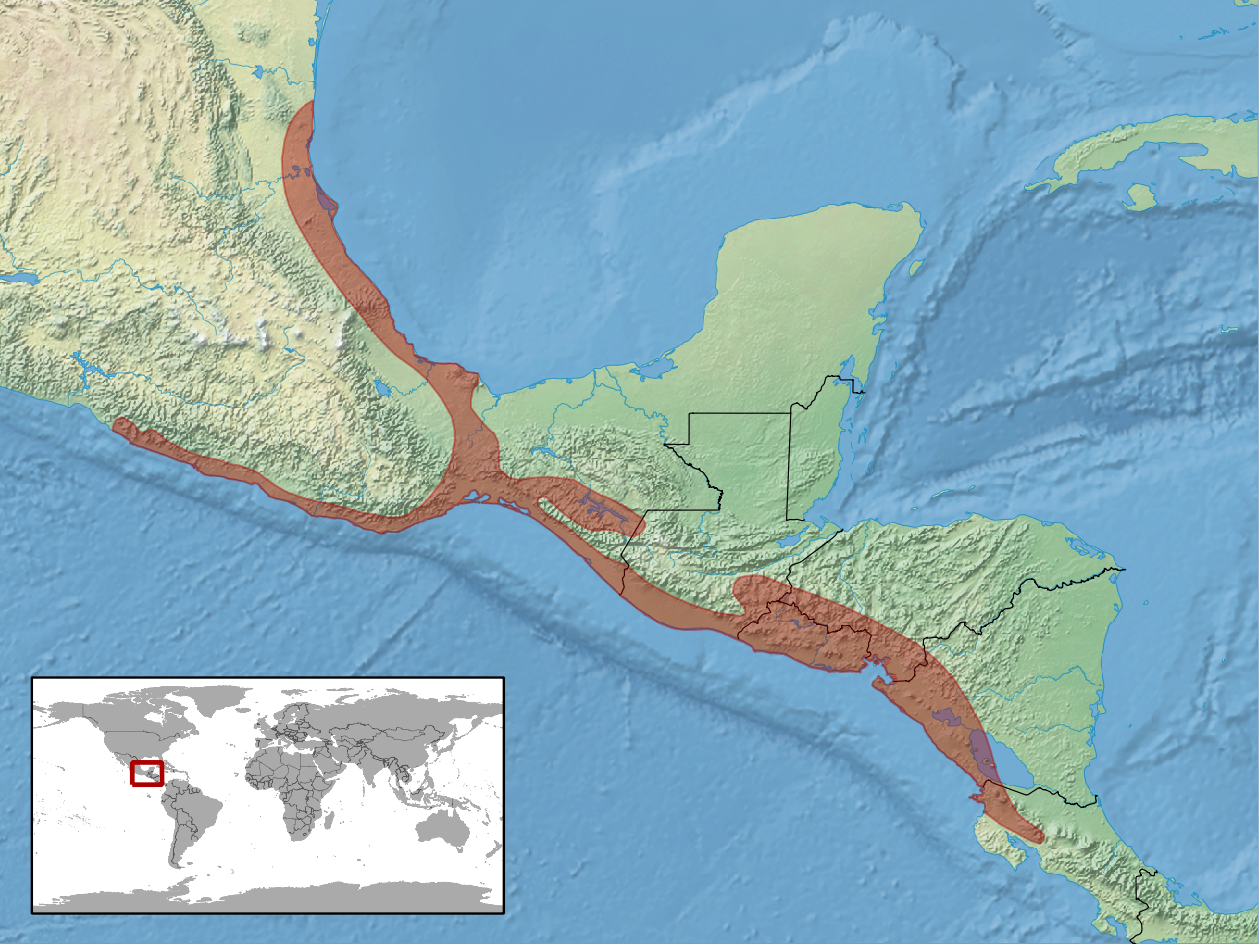

Synonyms
- Tachymenis taeniata W. Peters, 1870; Conophis lineatus — Ditmars, 1934; Liophis decoratus — Ditmars, 1934

= Coniophanes piceivittis =

Species of snake

Coniophanes piceivittis, known commonly as Cope's black-striped snake, is a species of small snake in the subfamily Dipsadinae of the family Colubridae. The species is endemic to Central America and Mexico, and is found in a wide range of habitats.

== Geographic range ==
C. piceivittis is found in Costa Rica, El Salvador, Guatemala, Honduras, southern Mexico, and Nicaragua.

== Reproduction ==
C. piceivittis is oviparous.

== Subspecies ==
Two subspecies are recognized as being valid, including the nominotypical subspecies.

- Coniophanes piceivittis frangivirgatus J. Peters, 1950
- Coniophanes piceivittis piceivittis Cope, 1869
