= List of reptiles of Guatemala =

This is a list of reptiles in Guatemala, including snakes, lizards, crocodilians, and turtles. Guatemala has a large variety of habitats, from tropical rain forests, dry thorn scrubs, cloud forests, coastal marshes, pine forests, mountains and lowlands. This vast contrast in biomes makes Guatemala home to a large variety of herpetofauna. These include approximately 240 species of reptiles, subdivided in 3 orders and 29 families.

Table of contents

Turtles: Cheloniidae • Dermochelyidae • Chelydridae • Dermatemydidae • Emydidae • Kinosternidae •

Crocodilians: Crocodylidae • Alligatoridae •

Lizards: Anguidae • Gekkonidae • Helodermatidae • Corytophanidae • Iguanidae • Phrynosomatidae • Polychrotidae • Scincidae • Teiidae • Gymnophthalmidae • Xantusiidae • Xenosauridae •

Snakes: Leptotyphlopidae • Typhlopidae • Boidae • Loxocemidae • Tropidophiidae • Colubridae • Elapidae • Viperidae •

Notes References

== Turtles (Testudines) ==
=== Cheloniidae ===
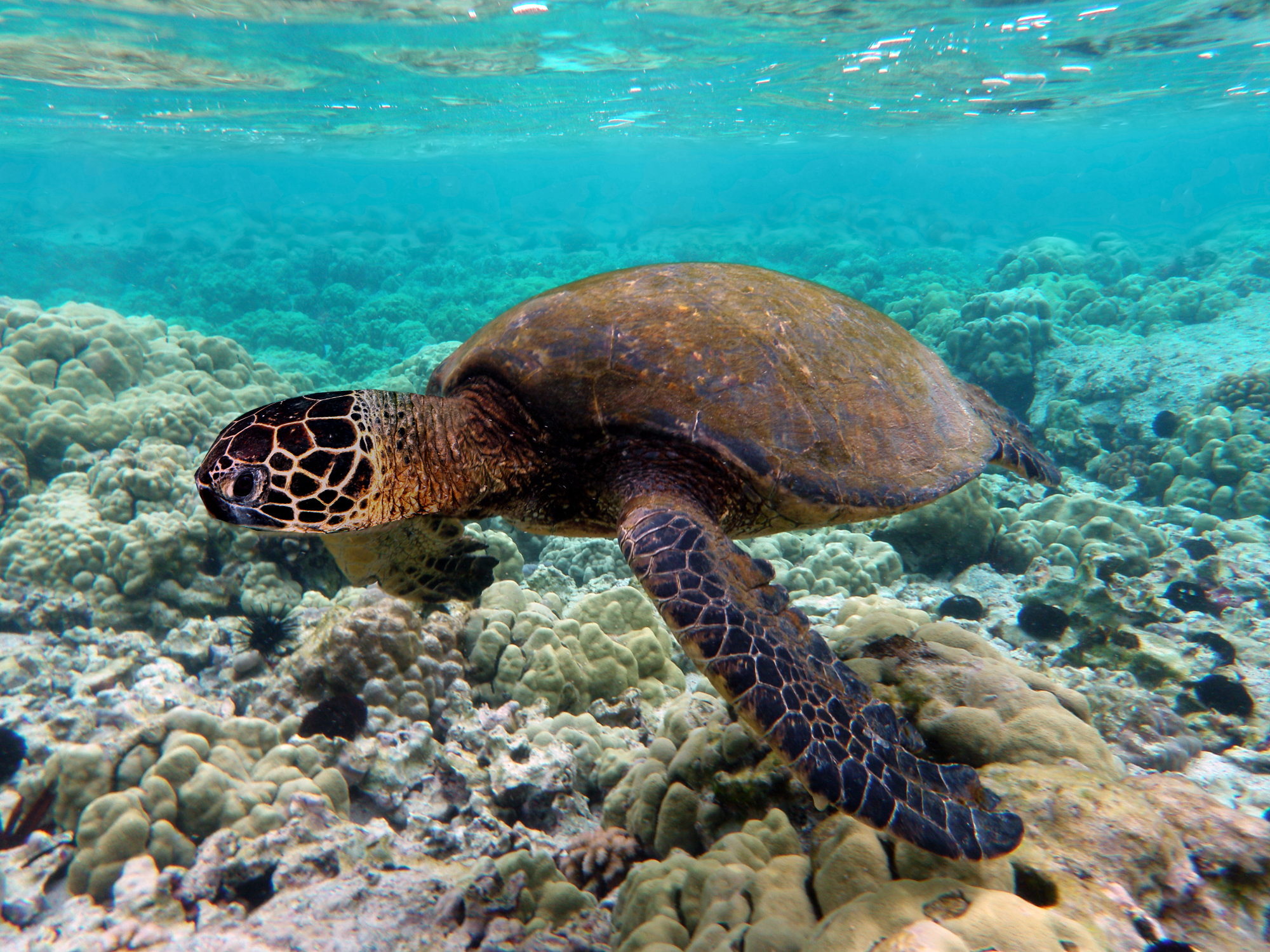
Chelonia mydas

Order: Testudines. Family: Cheloniidae

Sea turtles (Cheloniidae) are a family of large tortoises found in all tropical seas and some subtropical and temperate seas. Sea turtles evolved from land turtles about 120 million years ago and are well adapted to life in the sea. Sea turtles eat mostly jellyfish, crustaceans and squid. There are 6 species worldwide, of which at least 5 are currently endangered.

- Loggerhead sea turtle – Caretta caretta (Linnaeus, 1758) [EN]
- Pacific green turtle – Chelonia agassizii Bocourt, 1868 [EN]
- Green sea turtle – Chelonia mydas (Linnaeus, 1758) [EN]
- Hawksbill sea turtle – Eretmochelys imbricata (Linnaeus, 1766) [CR]
- Olive ridley sea turtle – Lepidochelys olivacea (Eschscholtz, 1829) [VU]

=== Dermochelyidae ===
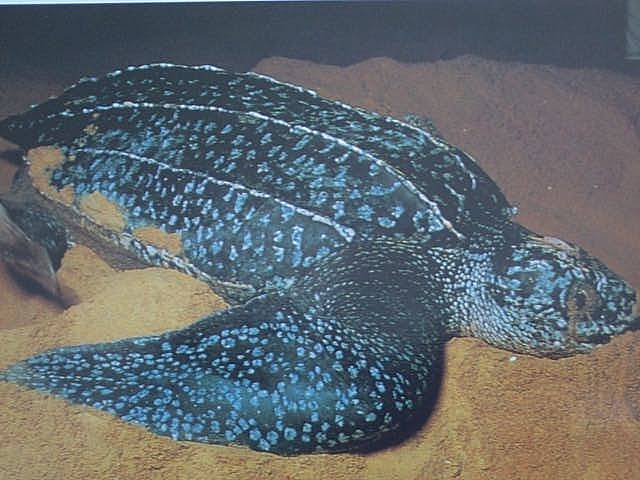
Dermochelys coriacea

Order: Testudines. Family: Dermochelyidae

The leatherback turtles are large marine turtles with longitudinally folded carapaces lacking the bony plates of other turtles. The species are well adapted to marine life and have bodies that are streamlined for faster swimming. In contrast to most sea turtles, leatherback turtles are often found in the cooler waters of temperate regions. The family has only one species left and is critically endangered. All other species are only known as fossils.

- Leatherback turtle – Dermochelys coriacea (Vandelli, 1761) [CR]

=== Chelydridae ===
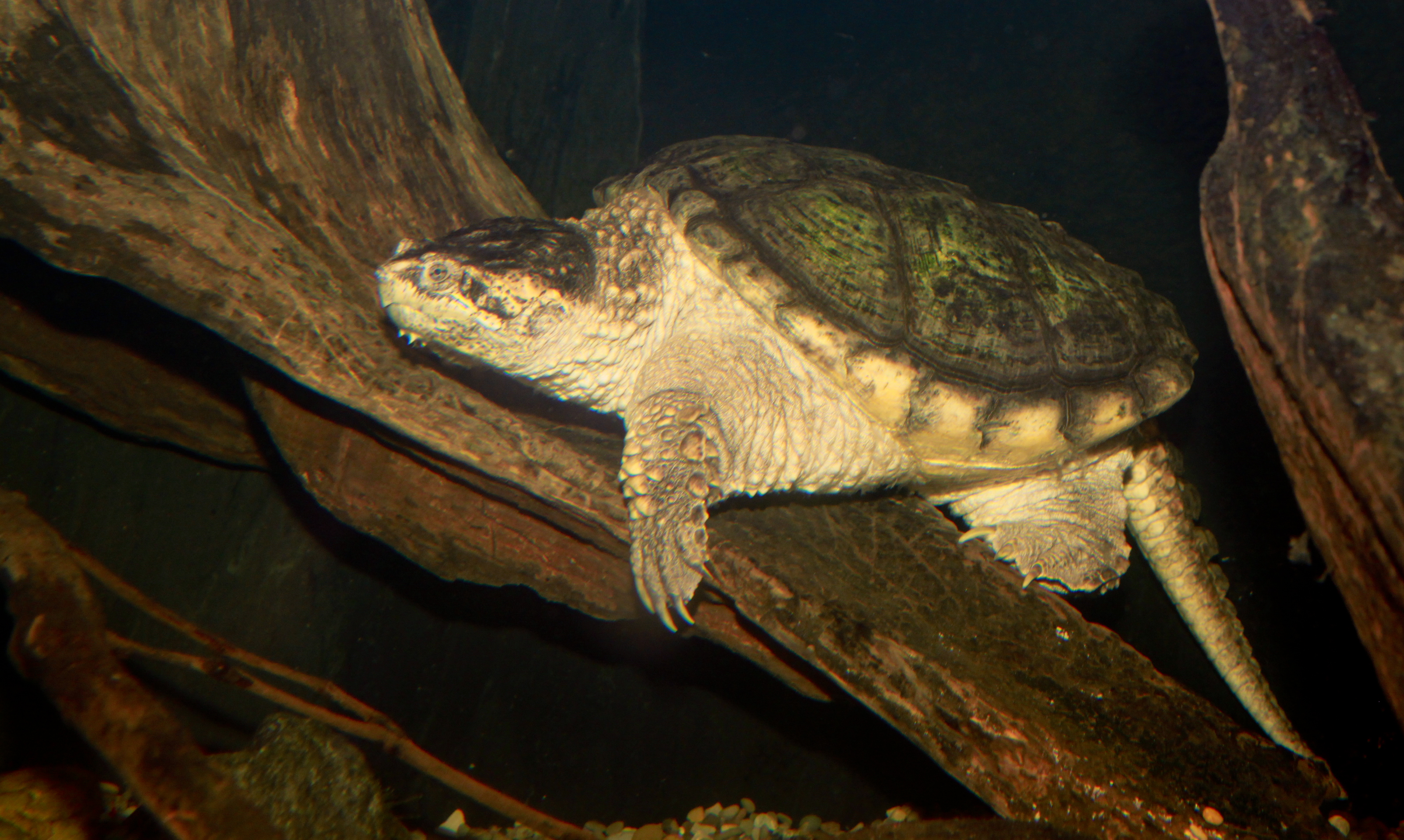
Chelydra serpentina

Order: Testudines. Family: Chelydridae

Chelydridae is a family of turtles which has seven extinct and two extant genera, both endemic to the Western Hemisphere. The extant genera are Chelydra the snapping turtles, and its larger relative Macrochelys, of which the alligator snapping turtle (Macrochelys temminckii) is the only species.

- Common snapping turtle – Chelydra serpentina (Linnaeus, 1758)

=== Dermatemydidae ===
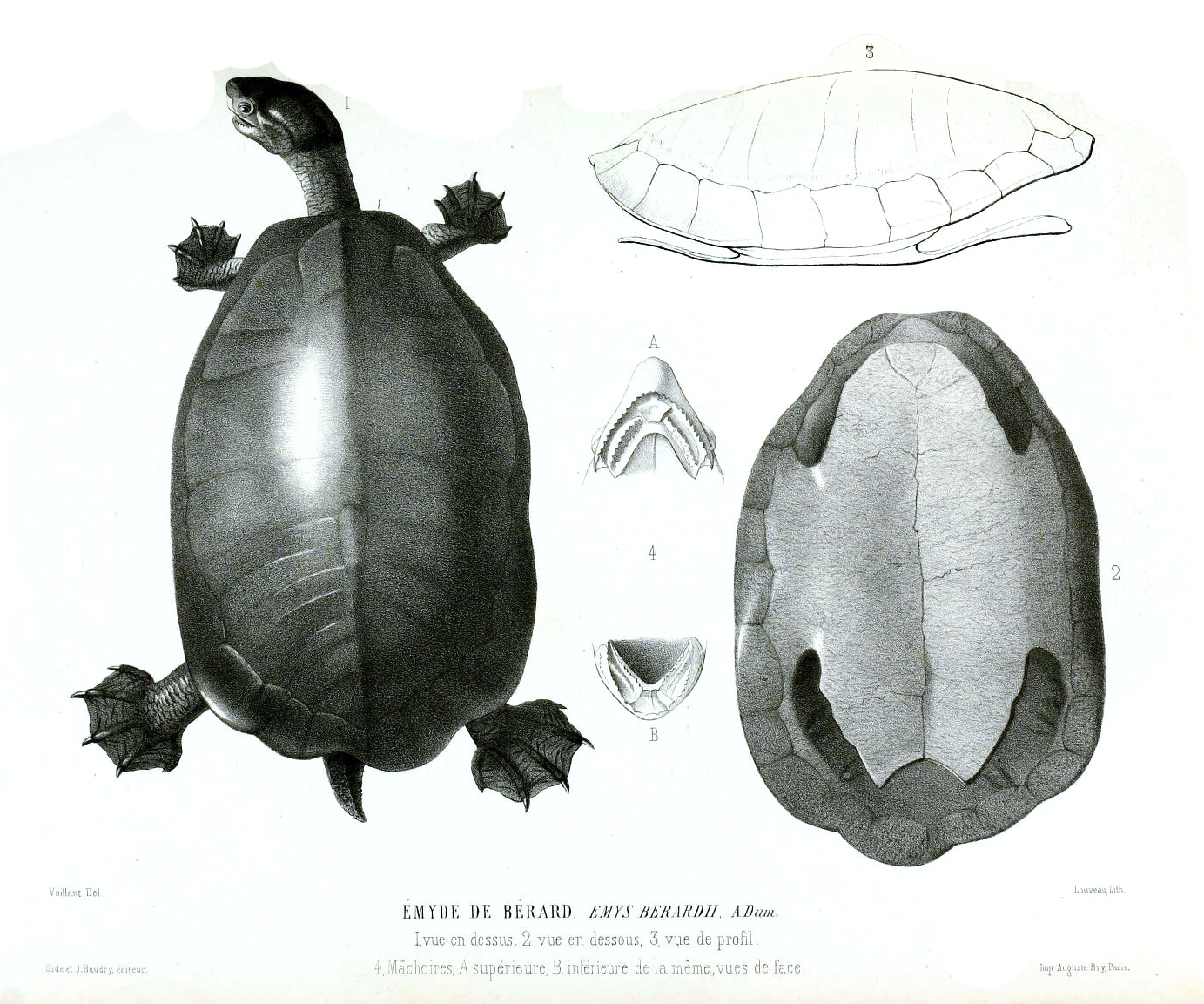
Dermatemys mawii

Order: Testudines. Family: Dermatemydidae

The Central American river turtle is the only living species in the family Dermatemydidae. It is a nocturnal, aquatic turtle that lives in larger rivers and lakes in Central America, from southern Mexico to northern Honduras. It is one of the world's most heavily exploited turtles and is classified a critically endangered species by the IUCN. It is a fairly large turtle, attaining a maximum size of 65 cm (25 inches) in carapace length, and can weigh in the range of 20 kg (44 lbs). They have a flattened carapace, that is usually a solid grey or almost black in color. Their plastron is normally cream colored.

- Central American river turtle – Dermatemys mawii Gray, 1847 [CR]

=== Emydidae ===
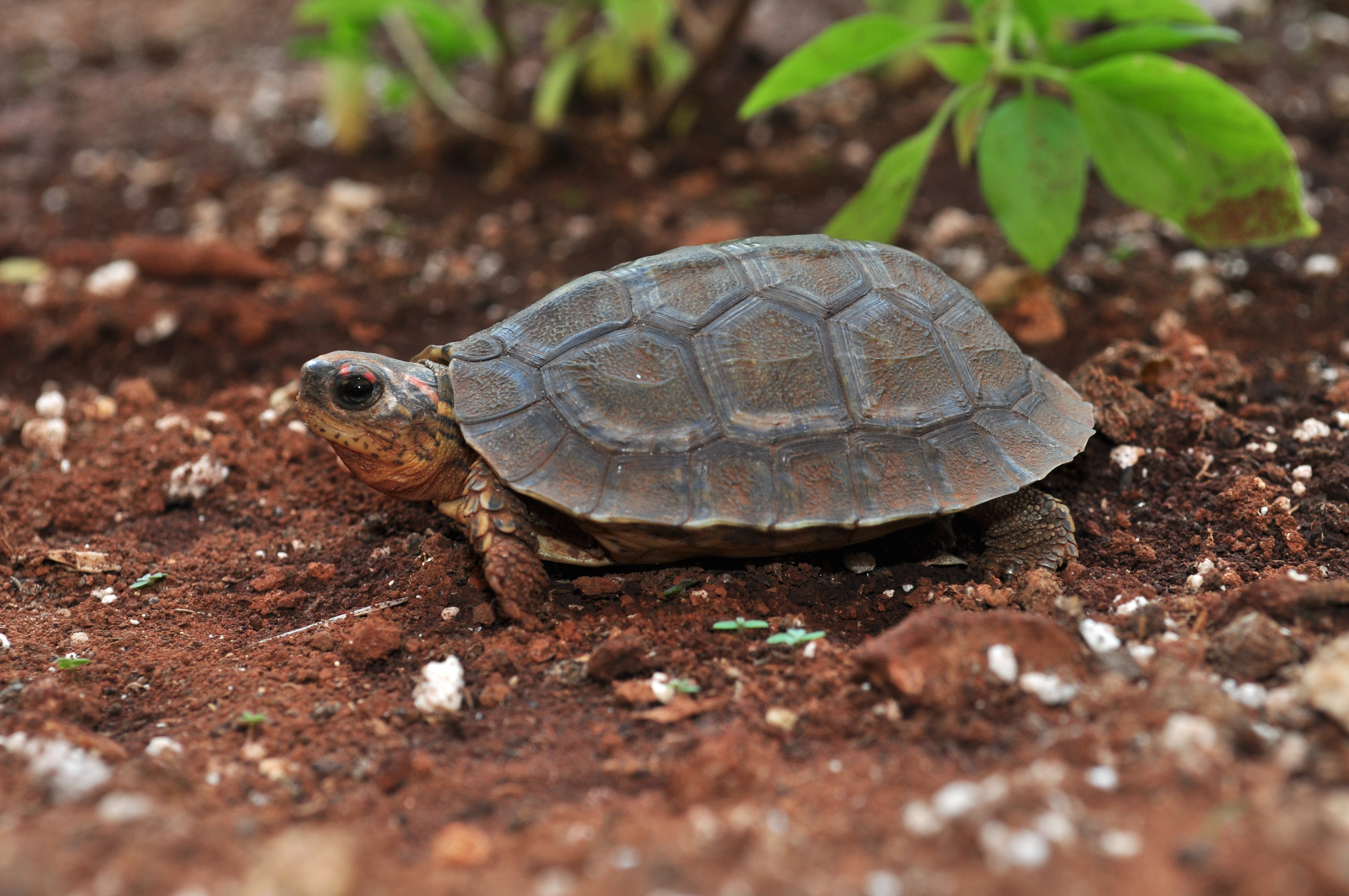
Rhinoclemmys areolata

Order: Testudines. Family: Emydidae

Emydidae, commonly called pond turtles or marsh turtles is a family of turtles which mostly occur in the Western Hemisphere. The family Emydidae includes close to 50 species in 10 genera.

- Furrowed wood turtle – Rhinoclemmys areolata (Duméril and Bibron, 1851)
- Painted wood turtle – Rhinoclemmys pulcherrima (Gray, 1855)
- Pond slider – Trachemys scripta (Schoepff, 1792)

=== Kinosternidae ===
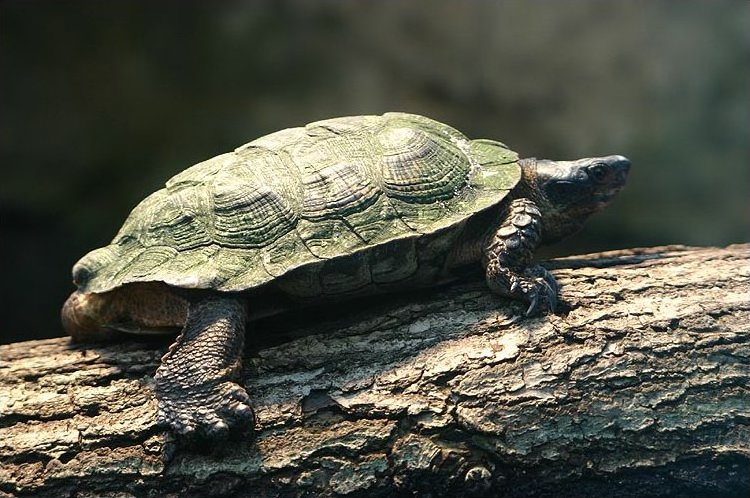
Kinosternon scorpioides

Order: Testudines. Family: Kinosternidae

Kinosternidae is a family of mostly small turtles, native to the Americas. They inhabit slow-moving bodies of water, often with soft, muddy bottoms and abundant vegetation. All members of the family are carnivorous, feeding on crustaceans, aquatic insects, mollusks, annelids, amphibians, small fish, and sometimes carrion. The family Kinosternidae currently contains 25 species within 4 genera.

- Tabasco mud turtle – Kinosternon acutum (Gray, 1831)
- White-lipped mud turtle – Kinosternon leucostomum Duméril and Bibron, 1851 [VU]
- Scorpion mud turtle – Kinosternon scorpioides (Linnaeus, 1766)
- Narrow-bridged musk turtle – Claudius angustatus Cope, 1865
- Giant musk turtle – Staurotypus salvinii Gray, 1864
- Mexican musk turtle – Staurotypus triporcatus (Wiegmann, 1828)

== Crocodilians (Crocodylia) ==
=== Crocodylidae ===
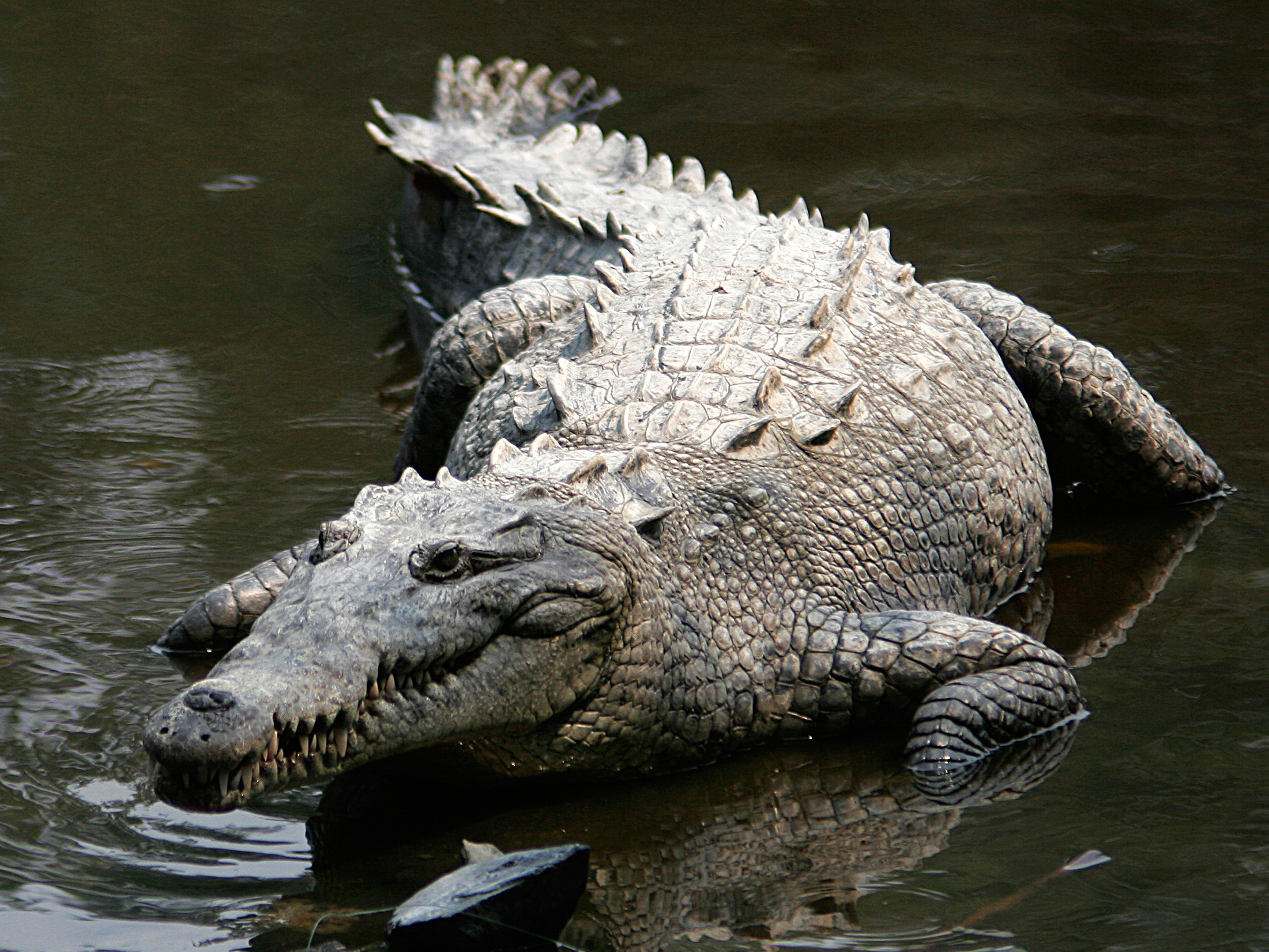
Crocodylus acutus

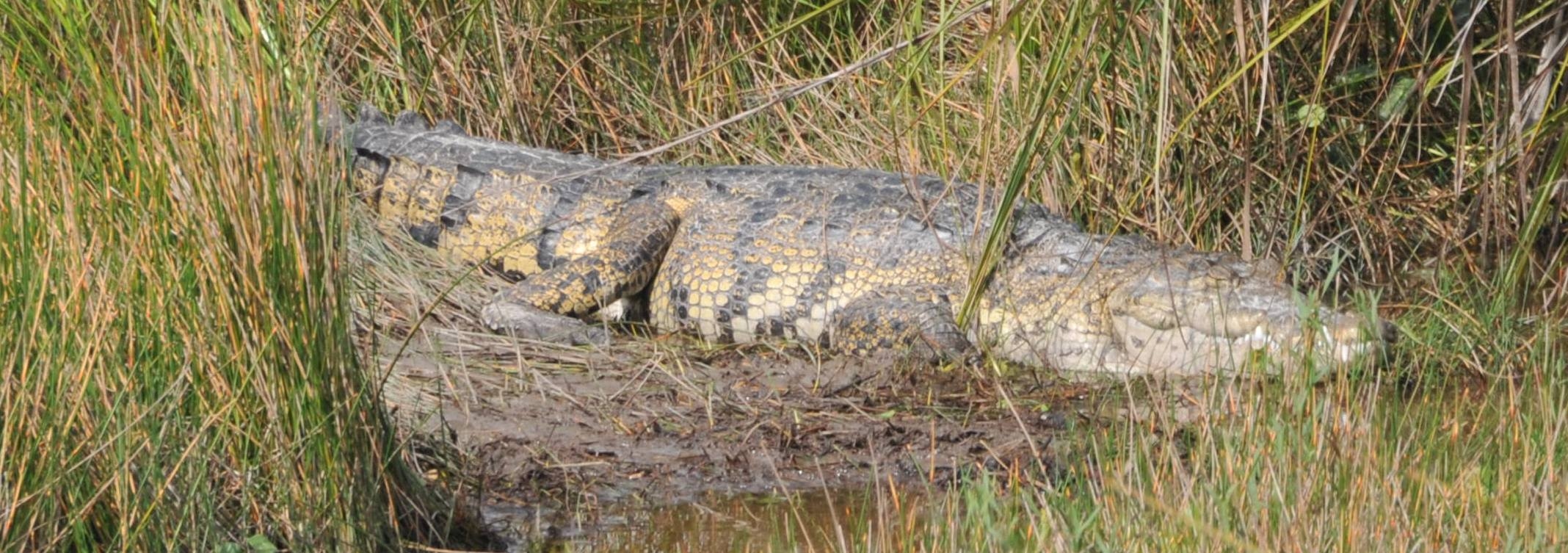
Crocodylus moreletii

Order: Crocodylia. Family: Crocodylidae

Crocodylidae is a family of large aquatic reptiles that live throughout the tropics in Africa, Asia, the Americas and Australia. Crocodiles tend to congregate in freshwater habitats like rivers, lakes, wetlands and sometimes in brackish water. Crocodiles are ambush hunters, waiting for fish or land animals to come close, then rushing out to attack. As cold-blooded predators, they have a very slow metabolism, and thus can survive long periods without food. They feed mostly on vertebrates like fish, reptiles, and mammals, sometimes on invertebrates like molluscs and crustaceans, depending on species. Despite their appearance of being slow, crocodiles are very fast over short distances, even out of water.

- American crocodile – Crocodylus acutus Cuvier, 1807 [VU]
- Morelet's crocodile – Crocodylus moreletii Duméril and Bocourt, 1851

=== Alligatoridae ===
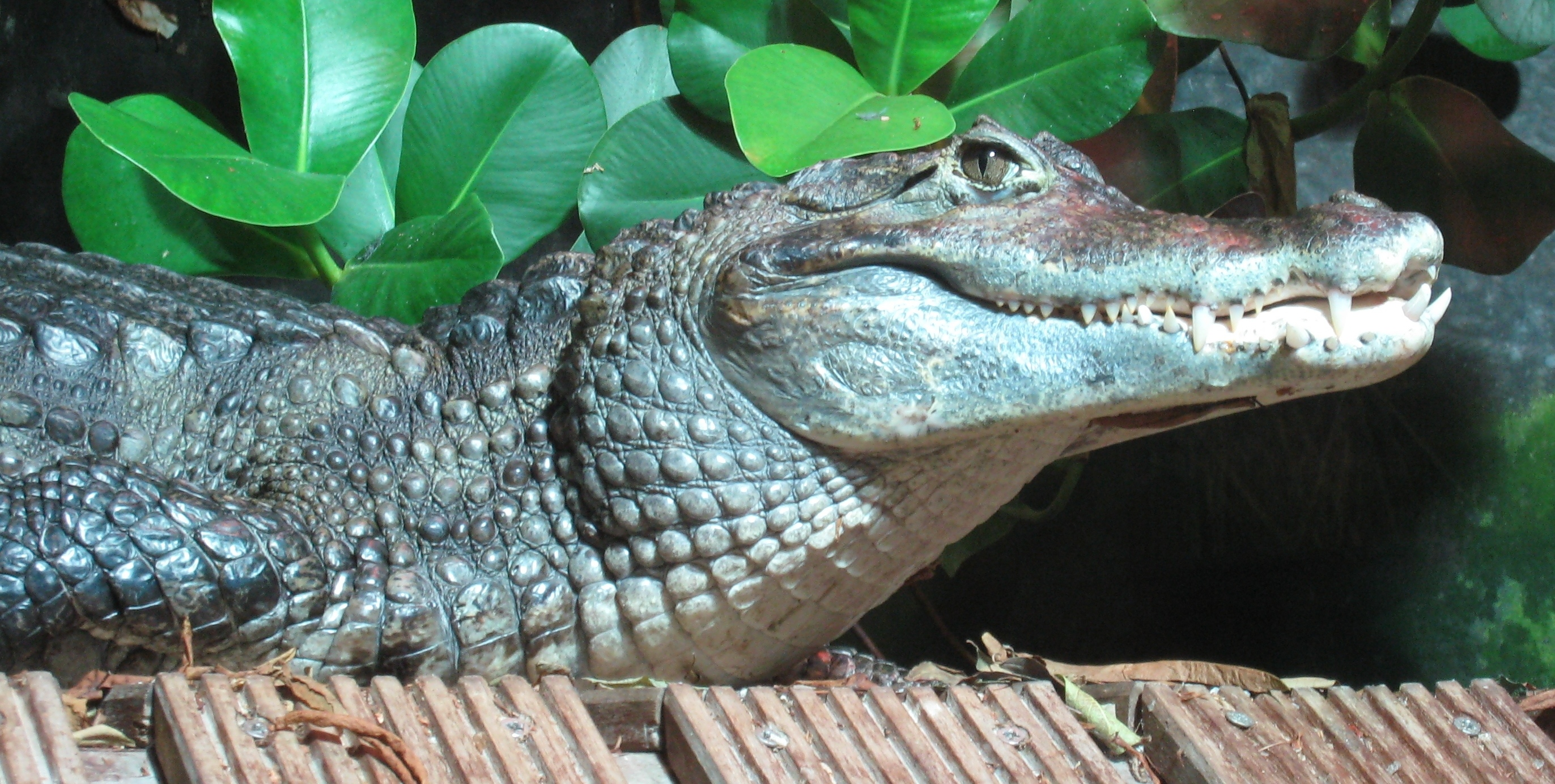
Caiman crocodilus

Order: Crocodylia. Family: Alligatoridae

Alligatoridae is a family of crocodylians that includes alligators and caimans. Its species are large aquatic reptiles that live in freshwater habitats throughout the Americas (6 or 7 species) and in China (1 species).

- Spectacled caiman – Caiman crocodilus Linnaeus, 1758

== Lizards (Squamata - suborder Lacertilia) ==
=== Anguidae ===
Order: Squamata. Family: Anguidae

Anguidae is a large and diverse family of lizards native to the Northern Hemisphere. The group includes the slowworms, glass lizards, and alligator lizards, among others. Anguidae is divided into three subfamilies and contains 94 species in eight genera. Their closest living relatives are the helodermatid lizards. Anguids are carnivorous or insectivorous, and inhabit a wide range of different habitats. The group includes both egg-laying and viviparous species. Most species are terrestrial, although some climb trees.

- Abronia anzuetoi Campbell and Frost, 1994
- Abronia aurita (Cope, 1869)
- Abronia campbelli Brodie and Savage, 1993
- Abronia fimbriata (Cope, 1885)
- Abronia frosti Campbell, Sasa, Acevedo, and Mendelson, 1998
- Abronia gaiophantasma Campbell and Frost, 1993
- Abronia matudai (Hartweg and Tihen, 1946)
- Abronia meledona Campbell and Brodie, 1999
- Abronia vasconcelosi (Bocourt, 1872)
- Mesaspis moreletii (Bocourt, 1872)
- Diploglossus atitlanensis (Smith and Taylor, 1950)
- Diploglossus bivittatus Boulenger, 1895
- Diploglossus rozellae (Smith, 1942)

=== Gekkonidae ===
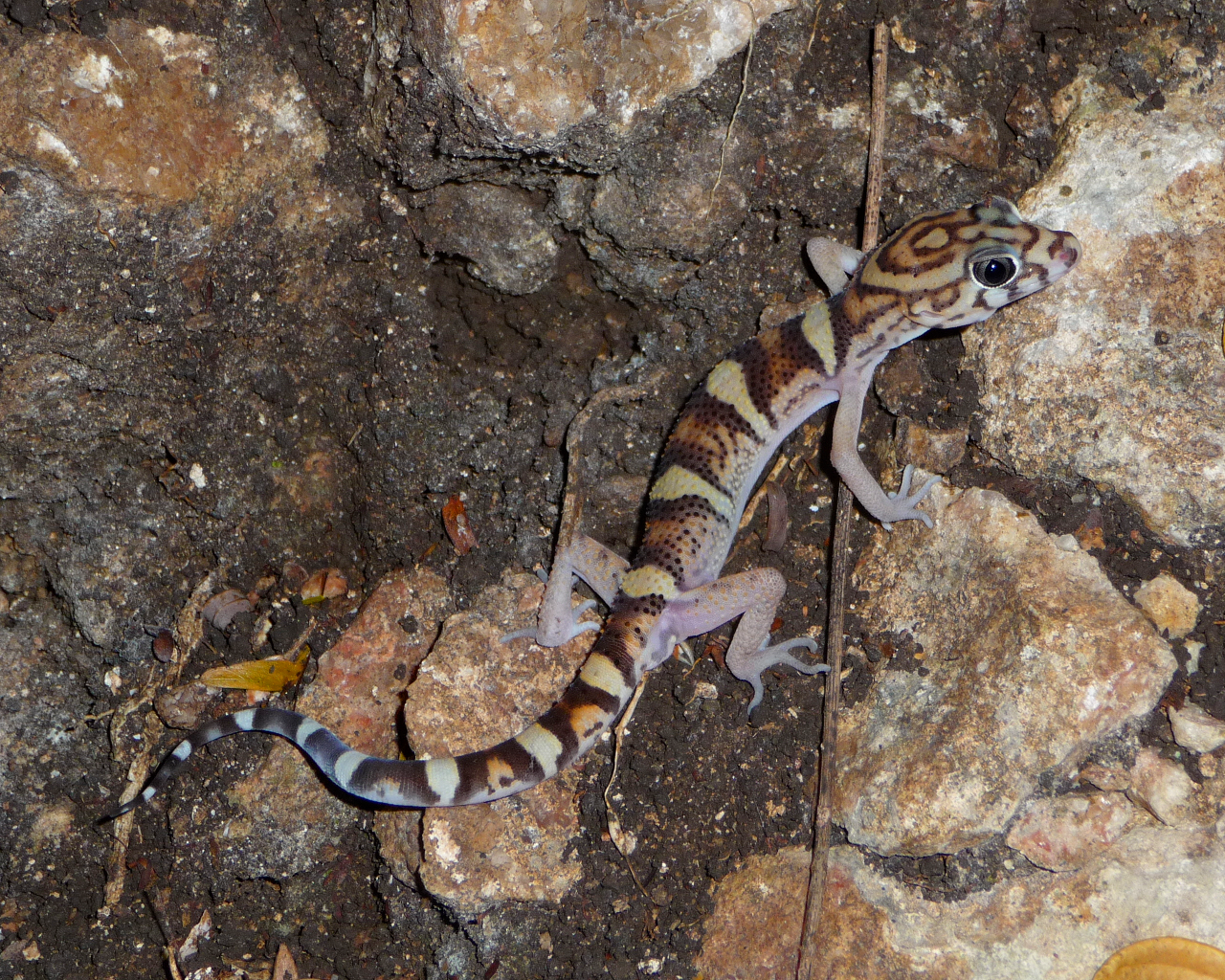
Coleonyx elegans

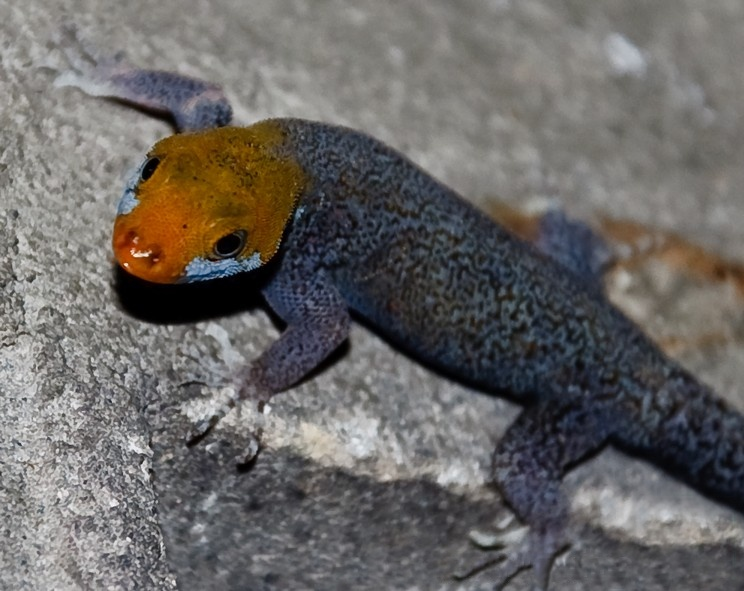
Gonatodes albogularis

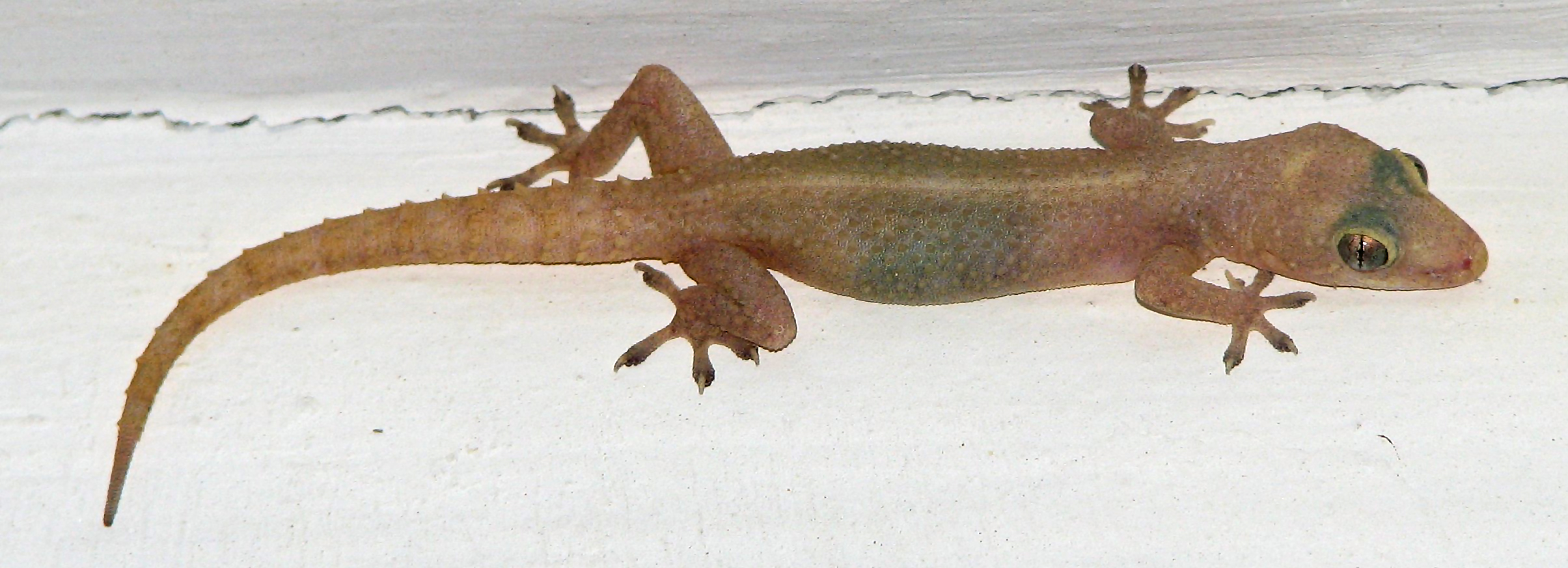
Hemidactylus frenatus

Order: Squamata. Family: Gekkonidae

Geckos are lizards found in warm climates throughout the world. They range from 1.6 cm to 60 cm. Geckos are unique among lizards in their vocalizations, making chirping sounds in social interactions with other geckos. Geckos are the second most species rich group of lizards with close to 1,500 different species worldwide. All geckos, excluding the family Eublepharidae, have no eyelids and instead have a transparent membrane, the brille, which they lick to clean. Many species will, in defense, expel a foul-smelling material and feces onto their aggressors. There are also many species that will drop their tails in defense. Many species are well known for their specialized toe pads that enable them to climb smooth and vertical surfaces, and even cross indoor ceilings with ease. Unlike most lizards, geckos are usually nocturnal and are great climbers. Geckos come in various patterns and colors such as purple, pink, blue, and black, and are among the most colorful lizards in the world.

- St. George Island gecko – Aristelliger georgeensis (Bocourt, 1870)
- Yucatán banded gecko – Coleonyx elegans Gray, 1845
- Central American banded gecko – Coleonyx mitratus Peters, 1863
- Yellow-headed gecko – Gonatodes albogularis (Duméril and Bibron, 1836)
- Common house gecko – Hemidactylus frenatus Schlegel, 1836
- Belize leaf-toed gecko – Phyllodactylus insularis Dixon, 1960
- Yellow-bellied gecko – Phyllodactylus tuberculosus Wiegmann, 1834
- Sphaerodactylus glaucus Cope, 1865
- Sphaerodactylus millepunctatus Hallowell, 1861
- Turnip-tailed gecko – Thecadactylus rapicauda (Houttuyn, 1782)

=== Helodermatidae ===
Order: Squamata. Family: Helodermatidae

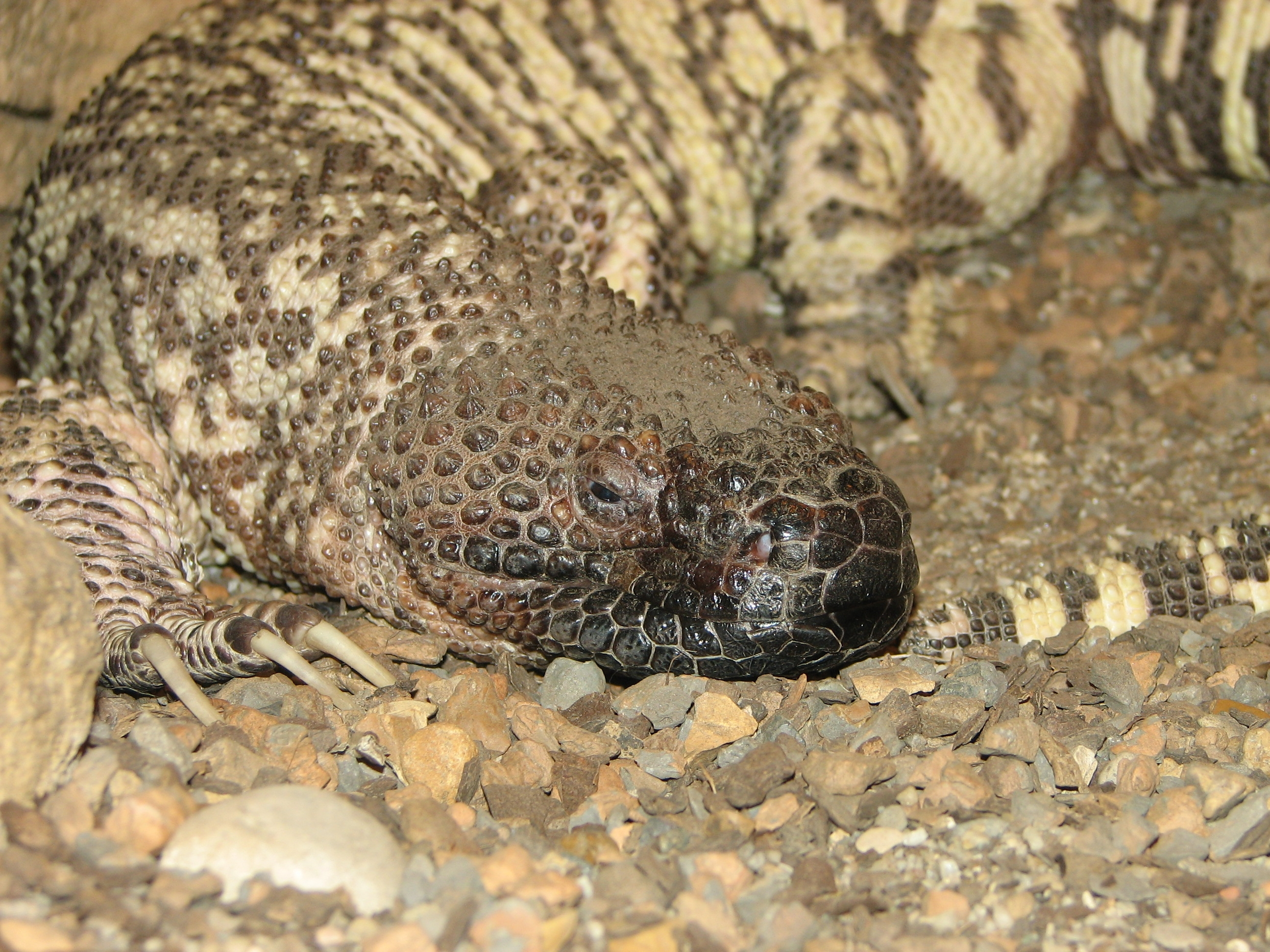
Heloderma horridum

Heloderma, the only genus of the family Helodermatidae, consists of venomous lizards native to Guatemala, Mexico and the southwestern United States. Their closest living relatives are the anguid lizards. Helodermatids (or beaded lizards) are large, stocky, slow-moving reptiles that prefer semi-arid habitats. The tails are short and used as fat storage organs. They are covered with small, non-overlapping bead-like scales. Both species are dark in color, with yellowish or pinkish markings. The species' venom glands are located in the lower jaw, unlike snakes' venom glands, which are located in the upper jaw. The venom is typically used only in defense, rather than in subduing prey, and the lizard must chew on its victim to work the venom into the flesh. Helodermatids are carnivorous, preying on rodents and other small mammals, and eating the eggs of birds and reptiles. They are oviparous, laying large clutches of eggs. The family Helodermatidae includes two species, with six subspecies. The species found in Guatemala is the beaded lizard (Heloderma horridum), which occurs in two subspecies, including the Motagua Valley subspecies (H. h. charlesborgeti), one of the rarest lizards in the world, with a wild population of fewer than 200 animals.

- Beaded lizard – Heloderma horridum (Wiegmann, 1829)

=== Corytophanidae ===
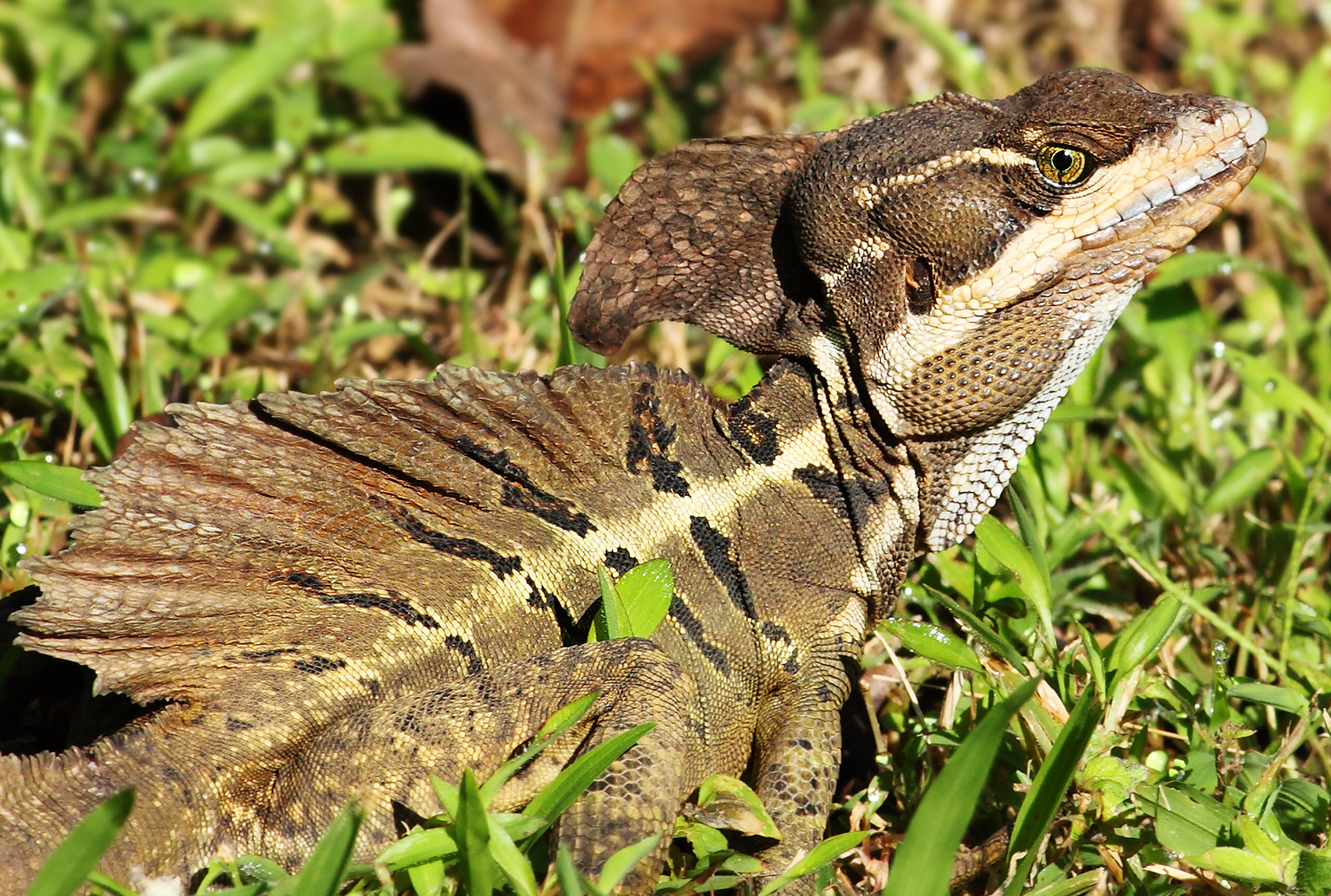
Basiliscus vittatus

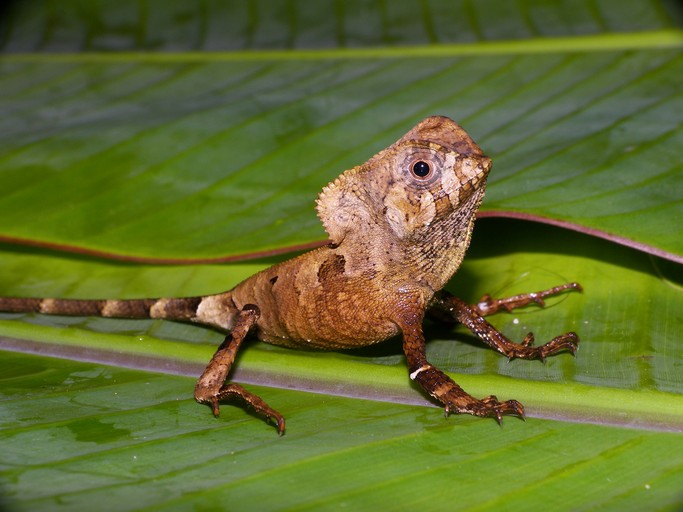
Corytophanes cristatus

Order: Squamata. Family: Corytophanidae

Corytophanidae is a family of lizards, commonly called casque head lizards or helmeted lizards. Casque heads are moderately sized forest-dwelling lizards with laterally compressed bodies. They typically have well-developed head crests in the shape of a casque. This crest is a sexually dimorphic characteristic in males of Basiliscus, but is present in both sexes of Corytophanes and Laemanctus. The crests are used in defensive displays where the lateral aspect of the body is brought about to face a potential predator in an effort to look bigger. Unlike many of their close relatives, they are unable to break off their tails when captured, probably because the tail is essential as a counterbalance during rapid movement. Despite the small size of the group, it includes both egg-laying species and some that give birth to live young. They are found from Mexico, through Central America, and as far south as Ecuador. There are 9 known species of casque heads. 6 of which occur in Guatemala.

- Brown basilisk – Basiliscus vittatus Wiegmann, 1828
- Helmeted iguana – Corytophanes cristatus (Merrem, 1821)
- Hernandez's helmeted basilisk – Corytophanes hernandesii (Wiegmann, 1831)
- Guatemalan helmeted basilisk – Corytophanes percarinatus Duméril, 1856
- Eastern casquehead iguana – Laemanctus longipes Wiegmann, 1834
- Serrated casquehead iguana – Laemanctus serratus Cope, 1864

=== Iguanidae ===
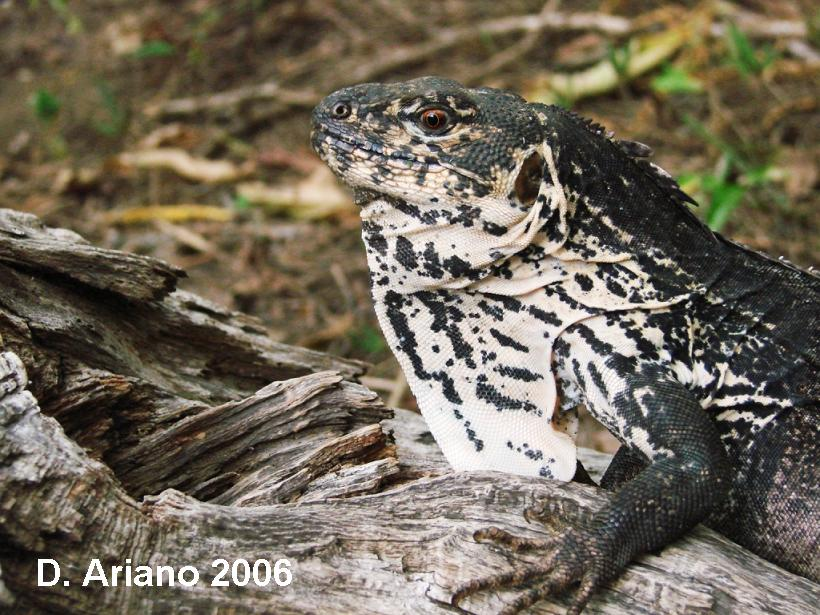
Ctenosaura palearis

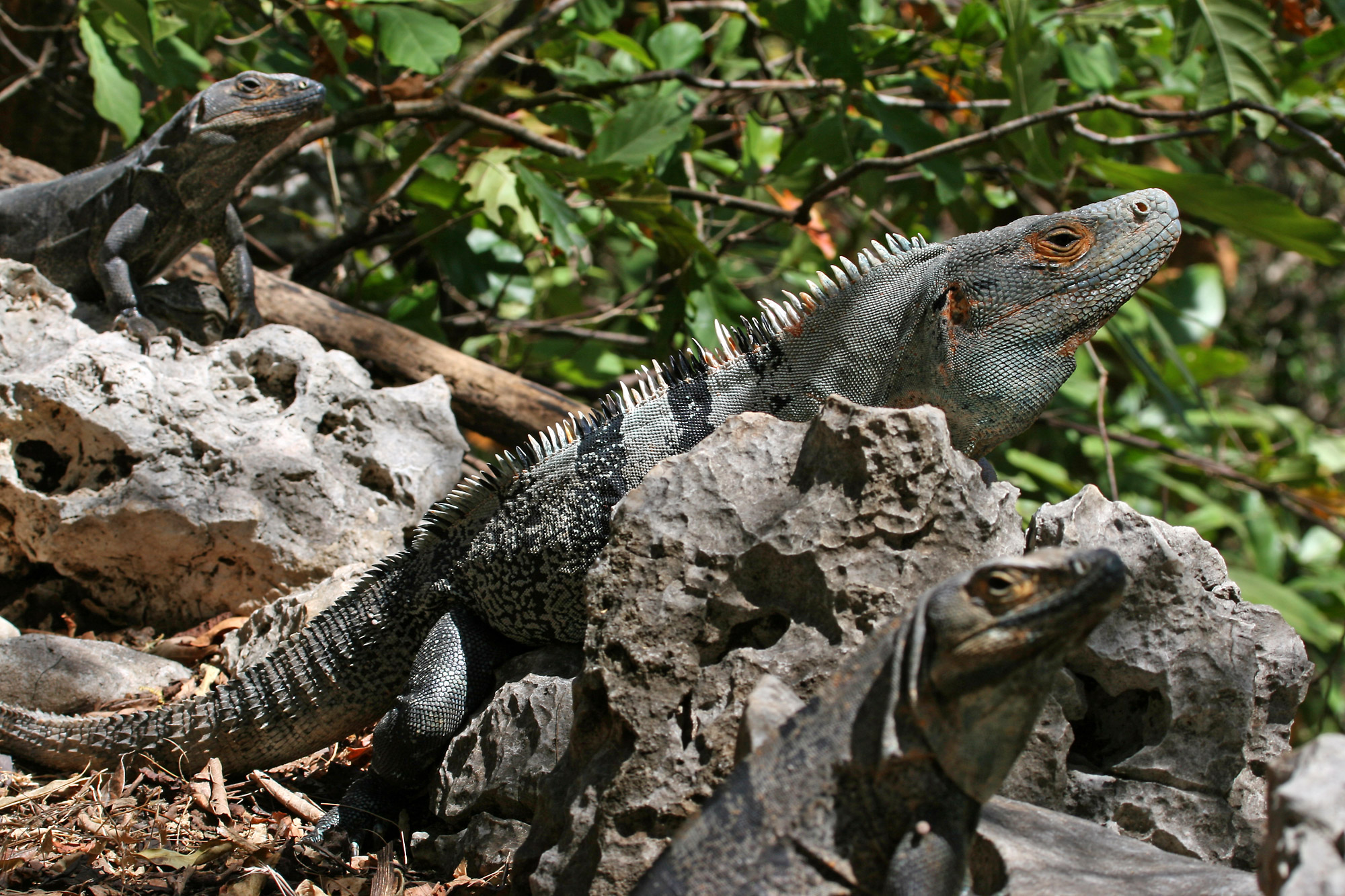
Ctenosaura similis

Order: Squamata. Family: Iguanidae

Iguanidae is a family of lizards that live in the Americas, from the southern United States to Paraguay, and from the Caribbean islands, to the Galápagos Islands and the Fiji Islands. Iguanas can reach lengths of 14 to 200 cm. The tail is often longer than the rest of the body. They often have dewlaps that help regulate body temperature, and rows of spines on their back, which are more pronounced in males than in females. Some iguanas species are terrestrial, others prefer living in trees or rocks. The males of most species are territorial and defend their territory against other males, but tolerate females. All iguanas are oviparous. The nests are usually quite large; often several females lay their eggs in close proximity. Juveniles feed mainly on insects and other invertebrates, while adults, especially the larger species, switch to a plant-based diet. The marine iguanas of the Galápagos Islands feed mainly on algae and seaweed.

- Guatemalan spiny-tailed iguana – Ctenosaura palearis Stejneger, 1899 (E, EN)
- Black spiny-tailed iguana – Ctenosaura similis (Gray, 1831)
- Green iguana – Iguana iguana (Linnaeus, 1758)

=== Phrynosomatidae ===
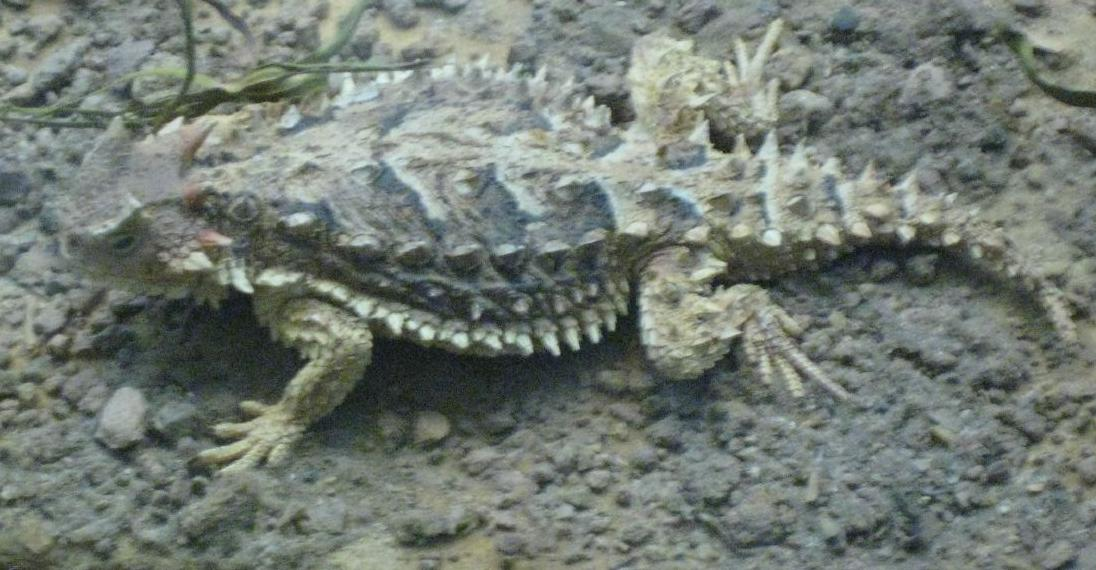
Phrynosoma asio

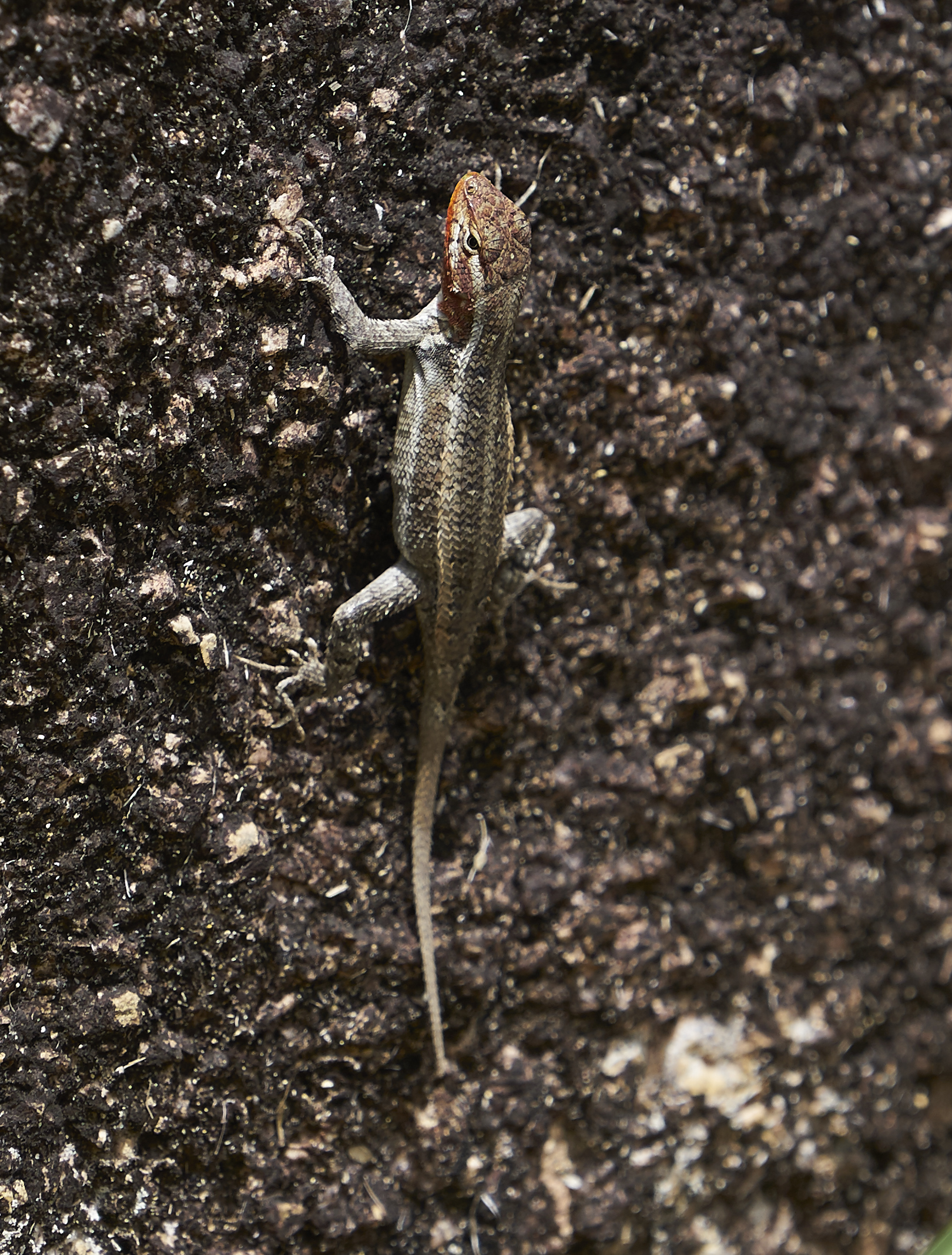
Sceloporus chrysostictus

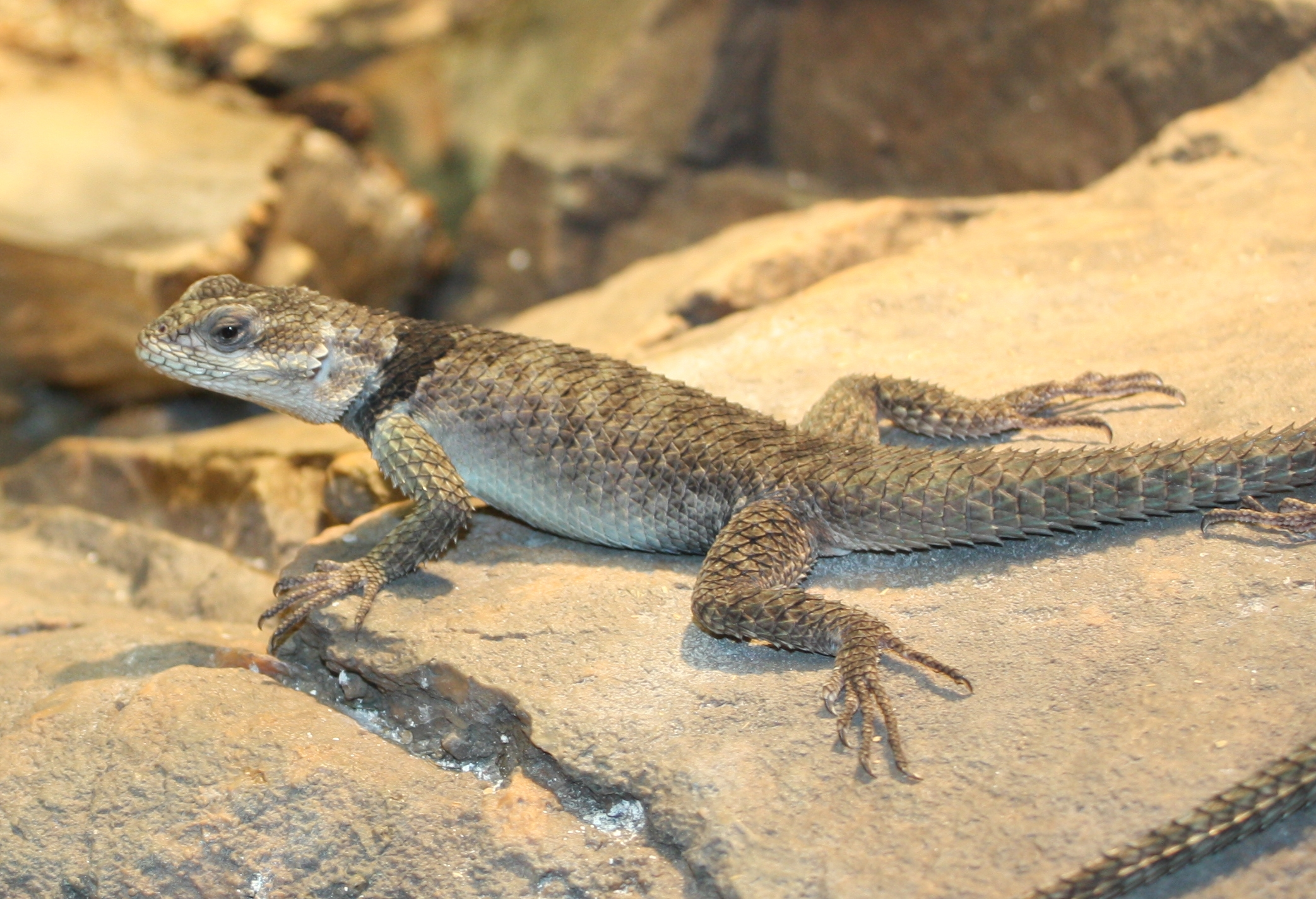
Sceloporus serrifer

Order: Squamata. Family: Phrynosomatidae

Phrynosomatidae is a diverse family of lizards, found from Panama to the extreme south of Canada. Many members of the group are adapted to life in hot, sandy deserts, although the spiny lizards prefer rocky deserts or even relatively moist forest edges, and the short-horned lizard lives in prairie or sagebrush environments. The group includes both egg-laying and viviparous species, with the latter being more common in species living at high elevations. There are 136 species in the Americas, 16 of which occur in Guatemala.

- Giant horned lizard – Phrynosoma asio Cope, 1864
- Bocourt's spiny lizard – Sceloporus acanthinus Bocourt, 1873
- Keeled spiny lizard – Sceloporus carinatus Smith, 1936
- Yellow-spotted spiny lizard – Sceloporus chrysostictus Cope, 1866
- Sceloporus internasalis Smith and Bumzahem, 1955
- Lundell's spiny lizard – Sceloporus lundelli Smith, 1939
- Pastel tree lizard – Sceloporus melanorhinus Bocourt, 1876
- Sceloporus prezygus Smith, 1942
- Sceloporus schmidti Jones, 1927
- Rough-scaled lizard – Sceloporus serrifer Cope, 1866
- Longtail spiny lizard – Sceloporus siniferus Cope, 1869
- Bocourt's emerald lizard – Sceloporus smaragdinus Bocourt, 1873
- Dwarf spiny lizard – Sceloporus squamosus Bocourt, 1874
- Guatemalan emerald spiny lizard – Sceloporus taeniocnemis Cope, 1885
- Teapen rosebelly lizard – Sceloporus teapensis Günther, 1890
- Rosebelly lizard – Sceloporus variabilis Wiegmann, 1834

=== Polychrotidae ===
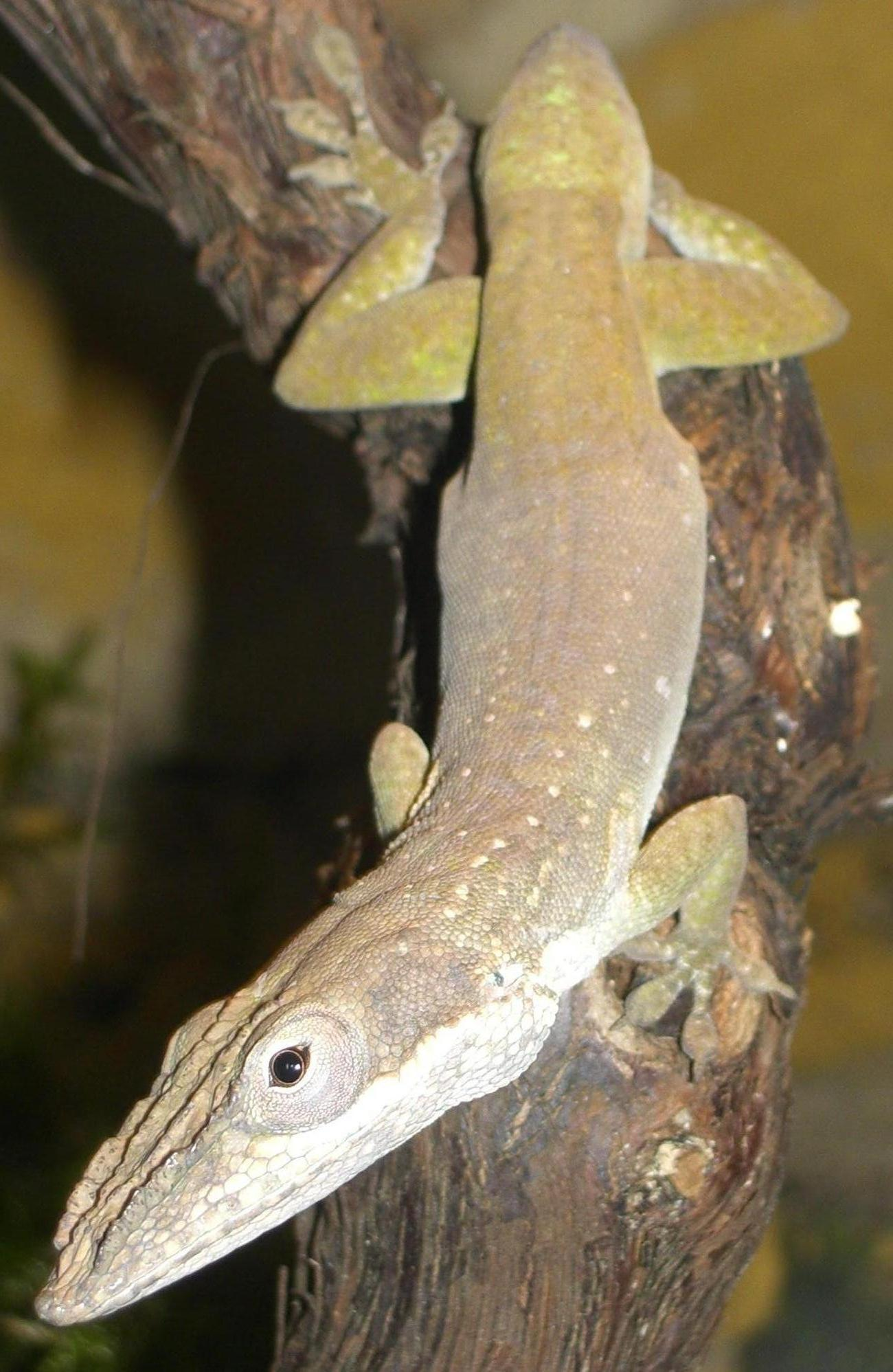
Anolis allisoni

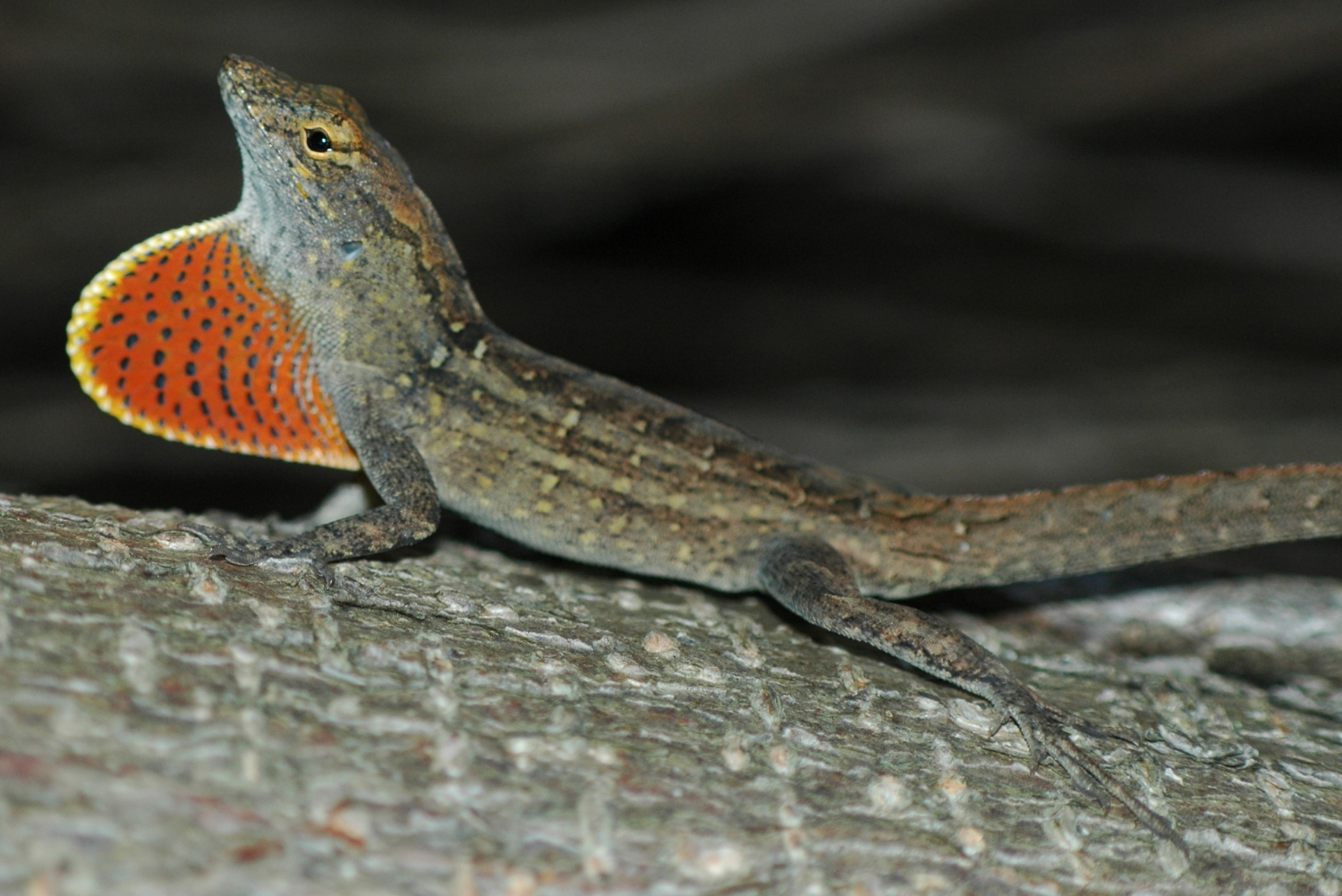
Anolis sagrei

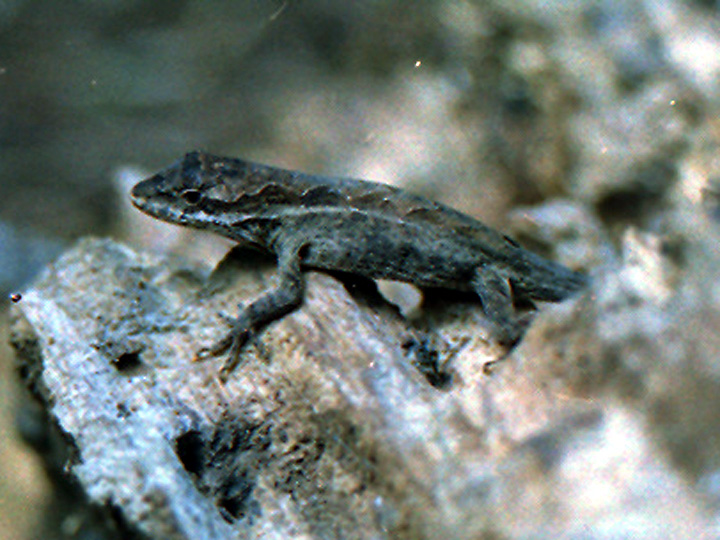
Norops crassulus

Order: Squamata. Family: Polychrotidae

Polychrotidae is a family of lizards commonly known as anoles. Anoles are small and common lizards found in the Americas, from southeastern United States, the Caribbean, Central America and South America. A large majority of them have a green coloration, although they can change their color based on mood and surroundings. Anoles are a diverse and plentiful group of lizards. NCBI places the anoles in the subfamily Polychrotinae of the family Iguanidae. There are currently about 372 known species in the Americas, and 20 species in Guatemala.

- Allison's anole – Anolis allisoni Barbour, 1928
- Becker's anole – Norops beckeri (Boulenger, 1881)
- Neotropical green anole – Norops biporcatus (Wiegmann, 1834)
- Norops bourgeaei (Bocourt, 1873) [Anolis laeviventris?]
- Bighead anole – Norops capito (Peters, 1863)
- Stuart's anole – Norops cobanensis (Stuart, 1942)
- Ornate anole – Norops crassulus (Cope, 1864)
- Cristifer anole – Norops cristifer (Smith, 1968)
- Copper anole – Norops cupreus (Hallowell, 1860)
- Coffee anole – Norops dollfusianus (Bocourt, 1873) [Anolis
- White anole – Norops laeviventris (Wiegmann, 1834) [Anolis laeviventris]
- Ghost anole – Norops lemurinus (Cope, 1861)
- Norops matudai (Smith, 1956)
- Norops nannodes (Cope, 1864)
- Peters' anole – Norops petersii (Bocourt, 1873)
- Norops rodriguezii (Bocourt, 1873)
- Cuban brown anole – Norops sagrei (Duméril and Bibron, 1837)
- Silky anole – Norops sericeus (Hallowell, 1856)
- Greater scaly anole – Norops tropidonotus (Peters, 1863)
- Lesser acaly anole – Norops uniformis (Cope, 1885)

=== Scincidae ===
Order: Squamata. Family: Scincidae

Scincidae is a family of lizards commonly known as called skinks. Skinks look roughly like true lizards, but most species have no pronounced neck and their legs are relatively small; in fact several genera (e.g., Typhlosaurus) have no limbs at all. Some other genera, such as Neoseps, have reduced limbs, lacking forelegs, and with fewer than five toes (digits) on each foot. In such species, their locomotion resembles that of snakes more than that of lizards with well-developed limbs. Most species of skinks have long, tapering tails that they can shed if a predator grabs the tail. Most skinks are medium-sized with snout-to-vent lengths of about 12 cm (4 or 5 in), although some species are either smaller or larger. Skinks are generally carnivorous and in particular insectivorous. Typical prey includes flies, crickets, grasshoppers, beetles, and caterpillars. Various species also eat earthworms, millipedes, snails, slugs, isopods, other lizards, and small rodents. Species occur in a variety of habitats worldwide, except in boreal and polar regions. With about 1200 described species, the Scincidae are the second most diverse family of lizards, exceeded only by the Gekkonidae (or geckos).

- Sumichrast's skink – Eumeces sumichrasti (Cope, 1866) [Plestiodon sumichrasti]
- Central American mabuya – Mabuya brachypoda Taylor, 1956
- Schwartze's skink – Mesoscincus schwartzei (Fischer, 1884)
- Sphenomorphus assatum (Cope, 1864)
- Brown forest skink – Spenomorphus cherriei (Cope, 1893) [Scincella cherriei]
- Stuart's forest skink – Sphenomorphus incertum (Stuart, 1940)

=== Teiidae ===
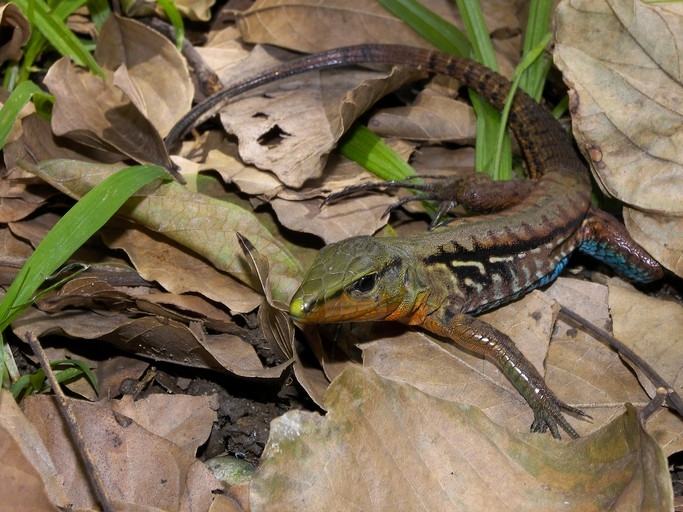
Holcosus festivus

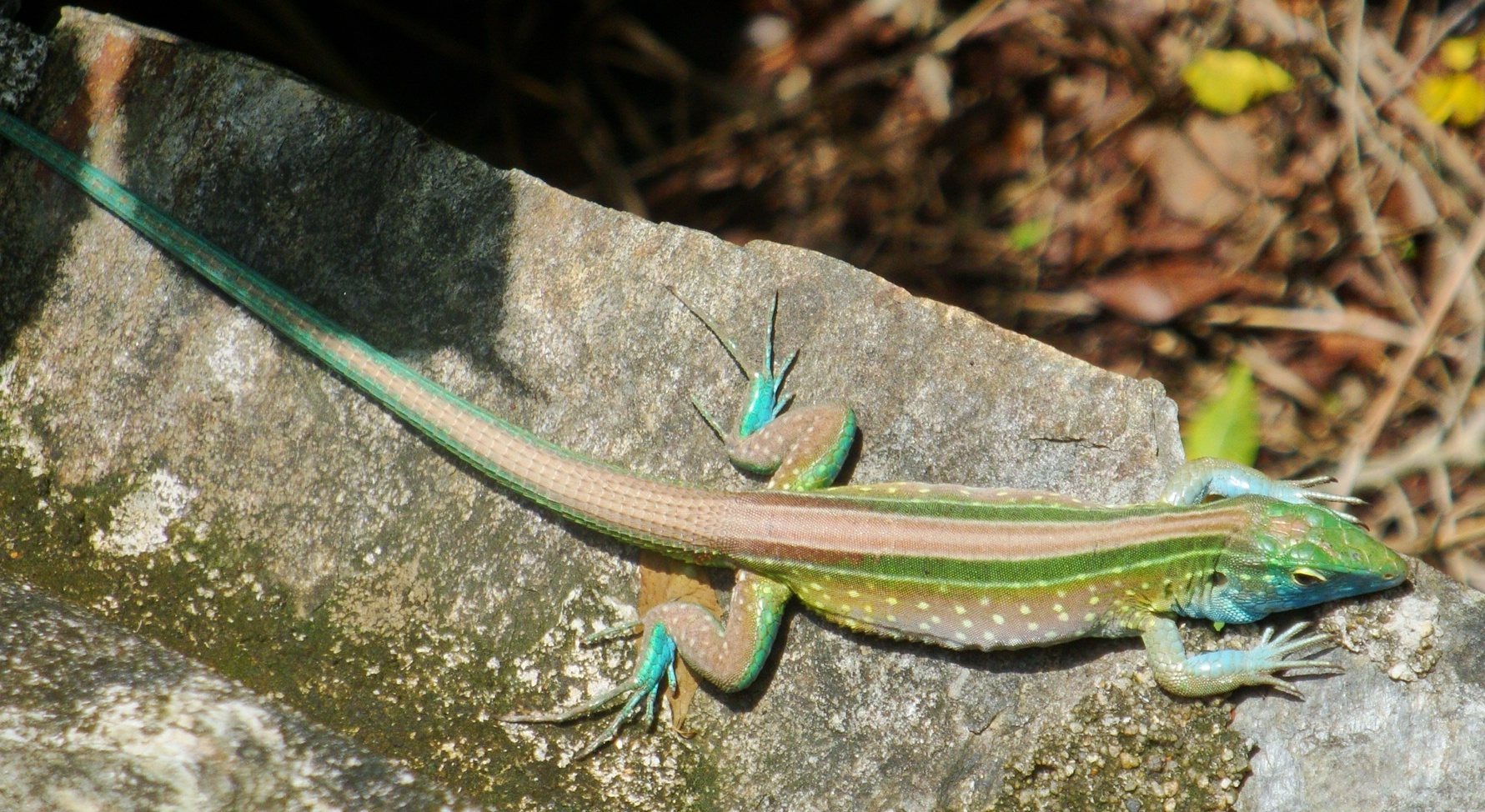
Cnemidophorus lemniscatus

Order: Squamata. Family: Teiidae

Teiidae is a family of lizards native to the Americas, generally known as whiptails. Teiids have large rectangular scales that form distinct transverse rows ventrally and generally small granular scales dorsally, they have head scales that are separate from the skull bones. All teiids have well-developed limbs and a forked, snake-like tongue. Teiids are terrestrial and diurnal, and are primarily carnivorous or insectivorous, although some will include a small amount of plant matter in their diet. They all lay eggs, with some species laying very large clutches. There are ten genera with over 230 species, 8 of which occur in Guatemala.

- Yucatan whiptail – Cnemidophorus angusticeps Cope, 1877
- Blackbelly racerunner – Cnemidophorus deppii Wiegmann, 1834 Aspidoscelis deppei
- Rainbow lizard – Cnemidophorus lemniscatus (Linnaeus, 1758)
- Cozumel racerunner – Cnemidophorus maslini Fritts, 1969 [Aspidoscelis cozumelae maslini]
- Giant whiptail – Cnemidophorus motaguae Sackett, 1941
- Chaitzam's ameiva – Holcosus chaitzami Stuart, 1942
- Middle American ameiva – Holcosus festivus (Lichtenstein, 1856)
- Rainbow ameiva – Holcosus undulatus (Wiegmann, 1834)

=== Gymnophthalmidae ===
Order: Squamata. Family: Gymnophthalmidae

Gymnophthalmidae is a family of lizards, sometimes known as spectacled lizards or microteiids. They are called 'spectacled' because of their transparent lower eyelids, so they can still see with closed eyes. Like most lizards, but unlike geckos, these eyelids are movable. Spectacled lizards are related to the Teiidae, but they look like skinks with smooth scales. They are generally small lizards; many species have reduced limbs. Gymnophthalmids live in a wide variety of habitats, from desert to mountain to rain forest, throughout Central America and South America. They are usually inhabitants of the forest floor or wet areas associated with tropical forests, either nocturnal or intermittently active throughout the day. Spectacled lizards eat mostly insects and other invertebrates, and all species lay eggs.

- Golden spectacled tegu – Gymnophthalmus speciosus (Hallowell, 1871)

=== Xantusiidae ===
Order: Squamata. Family: Xantusiidae

Night lizards (family name Xantusiidae) are a group of very small, viviparous (live-bearing) lizards, averaging from less than 4 cm to over 12 cm long. They have relatively flat bodies and heads. Their heads are covered by large, smooth plates, while their bodies have rougher, granular skin. Their eyes, like those of snakes, are covered by immoveable, transparent membranes that function as eyelids. They feed on insects and sometimes plants. Night lizards were originally thought to be nocturnal because of their secretive lifestyle, but they are in fact strictly diurnal. Night lizards have evolved to live in very narrow environmental niches—"microhabitat specialization"—such as rock crevices or damp logs, and may spend their entire life under the same cover. The family has only three genera with the following geographical distribution: Xantusia in southwestern United States and Baja California, Cricosaura in Cuba, and Lepidophyma in Central America. There is a total of approximately 23 living species, 3 of which occur in Guatemala.

- Yellow-spotted tropical night lizard – Lepidophyma flavimaculatum A. Duméril, 1851
- Mayan tropical night lizard – Lepidophyma mayae Bezy, 1973
- Smith's tropical night lizard – Lepidophyma smithii Bocourt, 1876

=== Xenosauridae ===
Order: Squamata. Family: Xenosauridae

Xenosauridae is a family of lizards native to Central America and China. Also known as knob-scaled lizards, they have rounded, bumpy scales and osteoderms. Most species prefer moist or semi-aquatic habitats, although they are widespread within their native regions, with some even inhabiting semi-arid scrub environments. They are carnivorous or insectivorous, and give birth to live young. There are approximately seven species worldwide, one of which occurs in Guatemala.

- Xenosaurus rackhami Stuart, 1941 [Xenosaurus grandis rackhami Stuart, 1941]

== Snakes (Squamata - suborder Serpentes) ==
Guatemala is home to approximately 134 species of snakes, grouped in 8 families. Most snakes are colubrid snakes (105 species), followed by the viperids (13 species), and the elapids (8 species).

=== Leptotyphlopidae ===
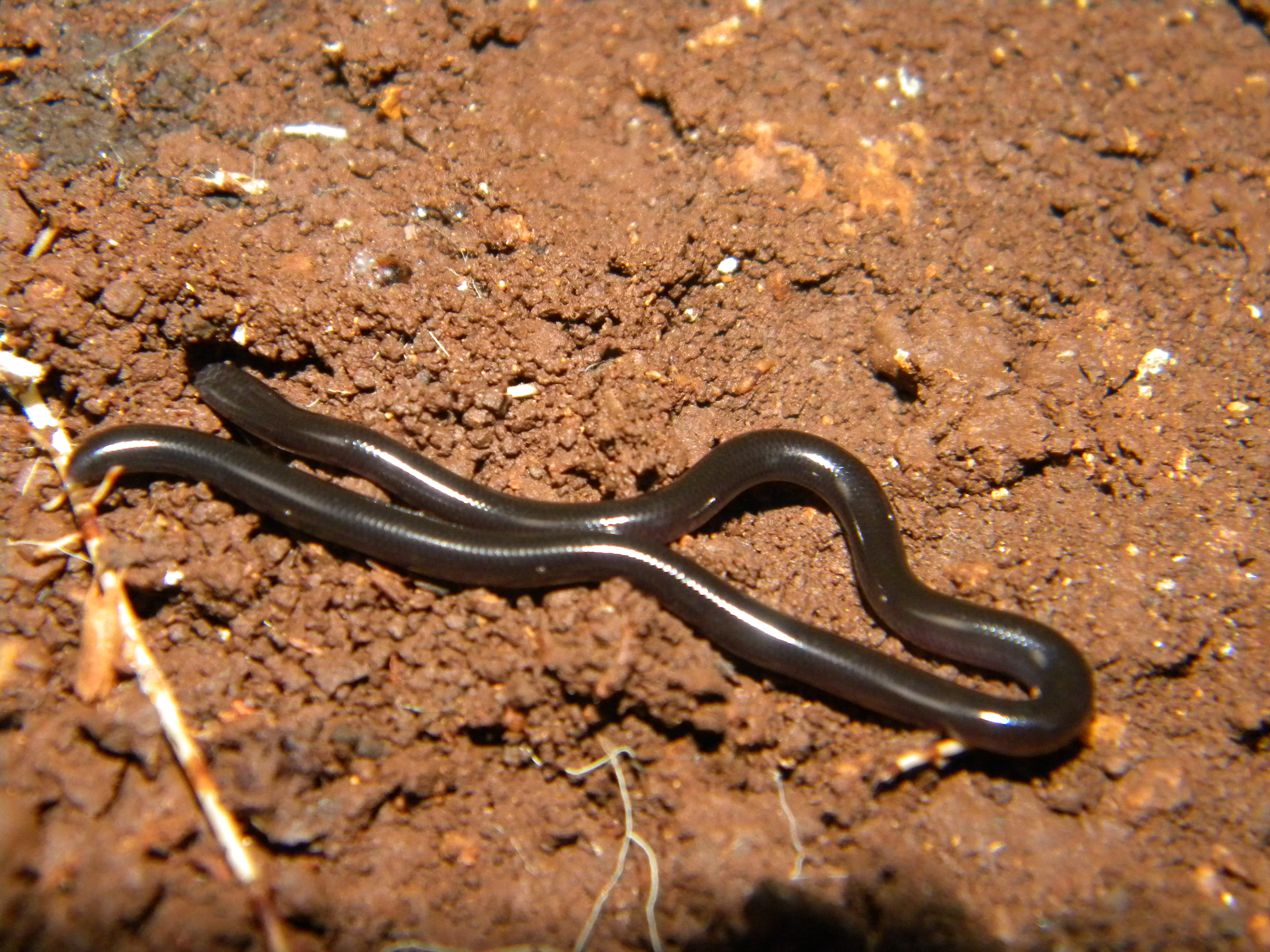
Leptotyphlops goudotii

Order: Squamata. Family: Leptotyphlopidae

The Leptotyphlopidae, commonly called slender blind snakes or thread snakes, are a family of snakes found in the Americas, Africa, and Asia. All are fossorial, adapted to burrowing, and feed on ants and termites. These are relatively small snakes rarely exceeding 30 cm in length. The body is cylindrical with blunt head and short tail. Scales are highly polished. Their diet consists mostly of termites or ants, their larvae and pupae. The pheremones they produce protect them from attack by termites. Two genera are recognized, comprising 87 species, one of which occurs in Guatemala.

- Black blind snake – Leptotyphlops goudotii (Duméril and Bibron, 1844)

=== Typhlopidae ===
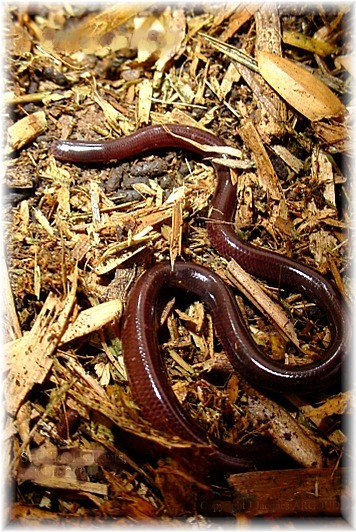
Ramphotyphlops braminus

Order: Squamata. Family: Typhlopidae

The Typhlopidae are a family of blind snakes. They are found mostly in the tropical regions of Africa, Asia, the Americas, mainland Australia and various islands. The rostral scale overhangs the mouth to form a shovel like burrowing structure. They live underground in burrows, and since they have no use for vision, their eyes are mostly vestigial. They have light-detecting black eyespots, and teeth occur in the upper jaw. The tail ends with a horn like scale. Most of these species are oviparous. Currently, 6 genera are recognized containing 203 species.

- Brahminy blind snake – Ramphotyphlops braminus (Daudin, 1803)
- Yucatán blind snake – Typhlops microstomus Cope, 1866
- Coffee worm snake – Typhlops tenuis Salvin, 1860

=== Boidae ===
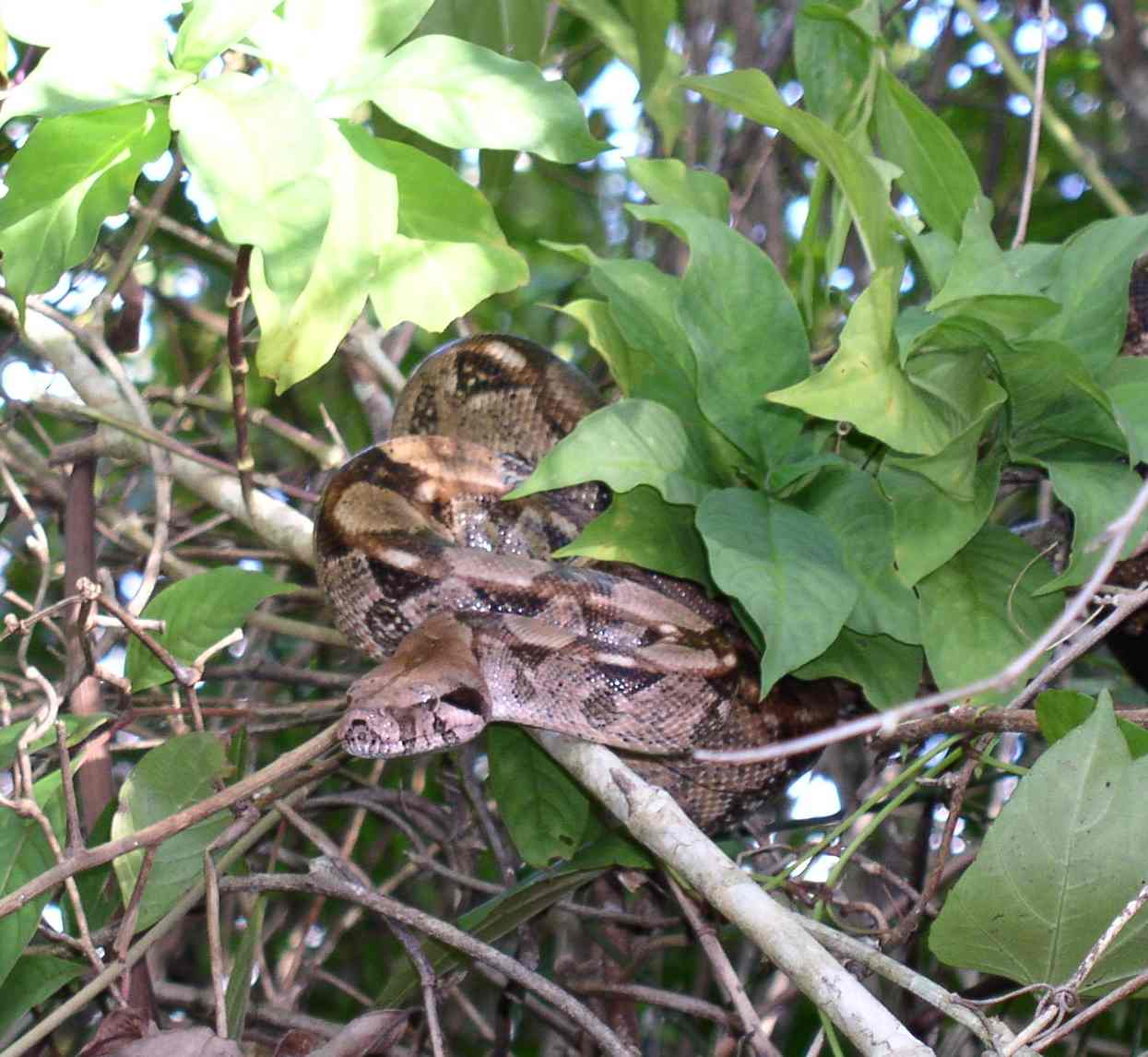
Northern boa

Order: Squamata. Family: Boidae

The Boidae are a family of nonvenomous snakes found in America, Africa, Europe, Asia and some Pacific Islands. Relatively primitive snakes, adults are medium to large in size, with females usually larger than the males. Prey is killed by a process known as constriction; after an animal has been grasped to restrain it, a number of coils are hastily wrapped around it. Then, by applying and maintaining sufficient pressure to prevent it from inhaling, the prey eventually succumbs due to asphyxiation. Two subfamilies comprising eight genera and 43 species are currently recognized. Two species occur in Guatemala.

- Northern boa – Boa imperator
- Ringed tree boa – Corallus annulatus (Cope, 1875)

=== Loxocemidae ===
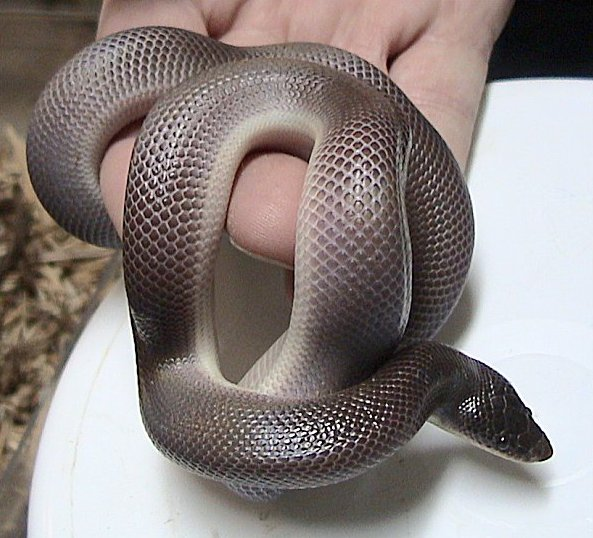
Loxocemus bicolor

Order: Squamata. Family: Loxocemidae

Loxocemidae is a monotypic family of snakes created for the monotypic genus Loxocemus that contains one single species L. bicolor, which is native to Mexico and Central America. They are found in a variety of habitats, including tropical moist and dry forests. Adults grow to a maximum of 1.57 m (62 in) in length, with an average length of roughly 91 cm (3 ft). The body is stout and very muscular. L. bicolor is a nocturnal and semi-fossorial snake, that feeds on small rodents and lizards. It has also been observed eating iguana eggs.

- Mexican python – Loxocemus bicolor Cope, 1861

=== Tropidophiidae ===
Order: Squamata. Family: Tropidophiidae

The Tropidophiinae, common name dwarf boas, are a subfamily of snakes found from Mexico and the West Indies south to southeastern Brazil. These are small to medium-sized fossorial snakes, some with beautiful and striking color patterns. These snakes are very small, averaging to about 30–60 cm in length. Most species spend their day burrowed underground or under vegetation, surfacing only at night or when it rains. Some species are arboreal and are often seen hiding in bromeliads in trees. They can change color from light (when they are active at night) to dark (inactive in the day). This color change is brought about by the movement of dark pigment granules. When threatened, they coil up into a tight ball. A more peculiar defensive behavior is their ability to bleed voluntarily from the eyes, mouth, and nostrils. Currently, there is a total of 4 living genera containing 22 species, and one species that occurs in Guatemala.

- Chiapan boa – Ungaliophis continentalis Müller, 1880

=== Colubridae ===
Order: Squamata. Family: Colubridae

Colubridae (from Latin coluber, snake) is a family of snakes. This broad classification of snakes includes about two-thirds of all snake species on earth. The earliest species of the snake family date back to the Oligocene epoch. While most colubrids are nonvenomous (or have venom that is not known to be harmful to humans) and are mostly harmless, a few groups, such as genus Boiga, can produce medically significant bites. Colubridae is the largest snake family and Colubrid species are found on every continent except Antarctica. There are 304 genera and 1,938 colubrid species worldwide, and 105 species occurring in Guatemala.

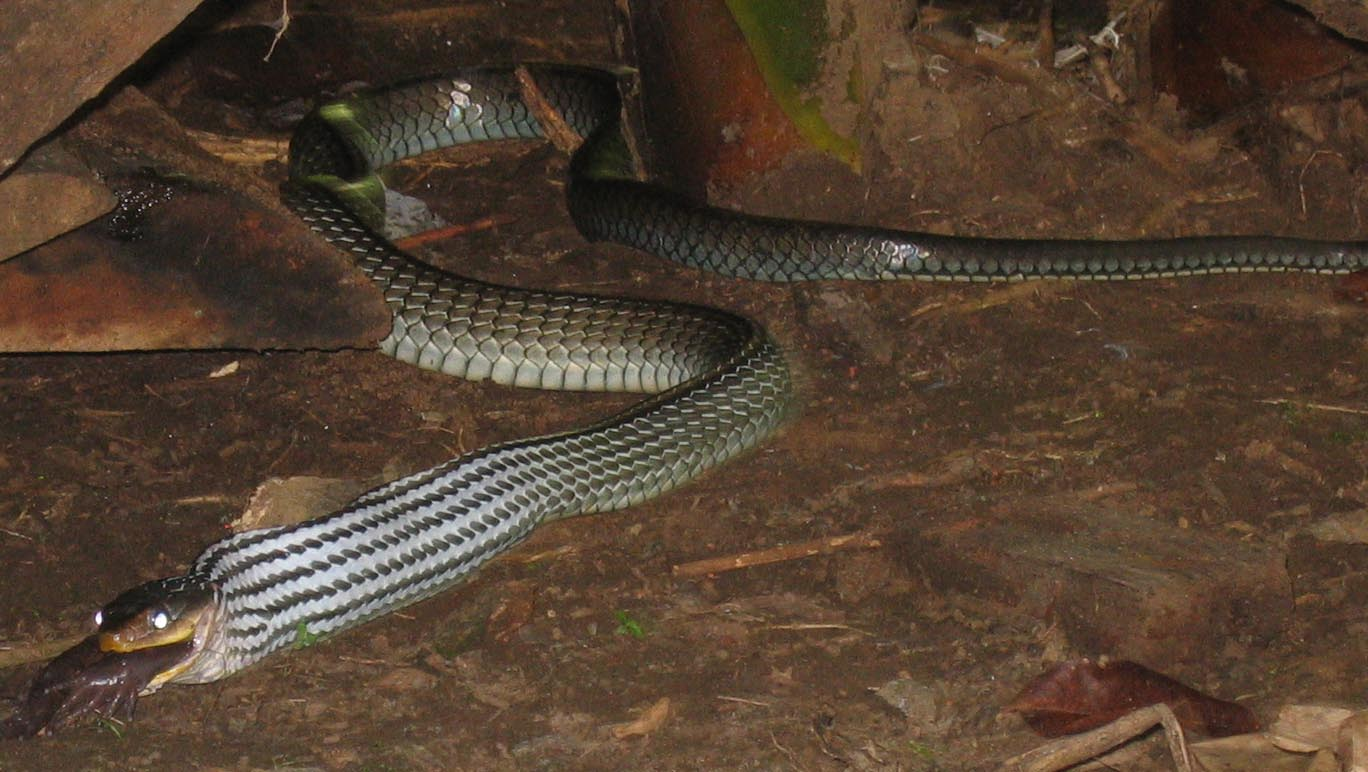
Clelia clelia

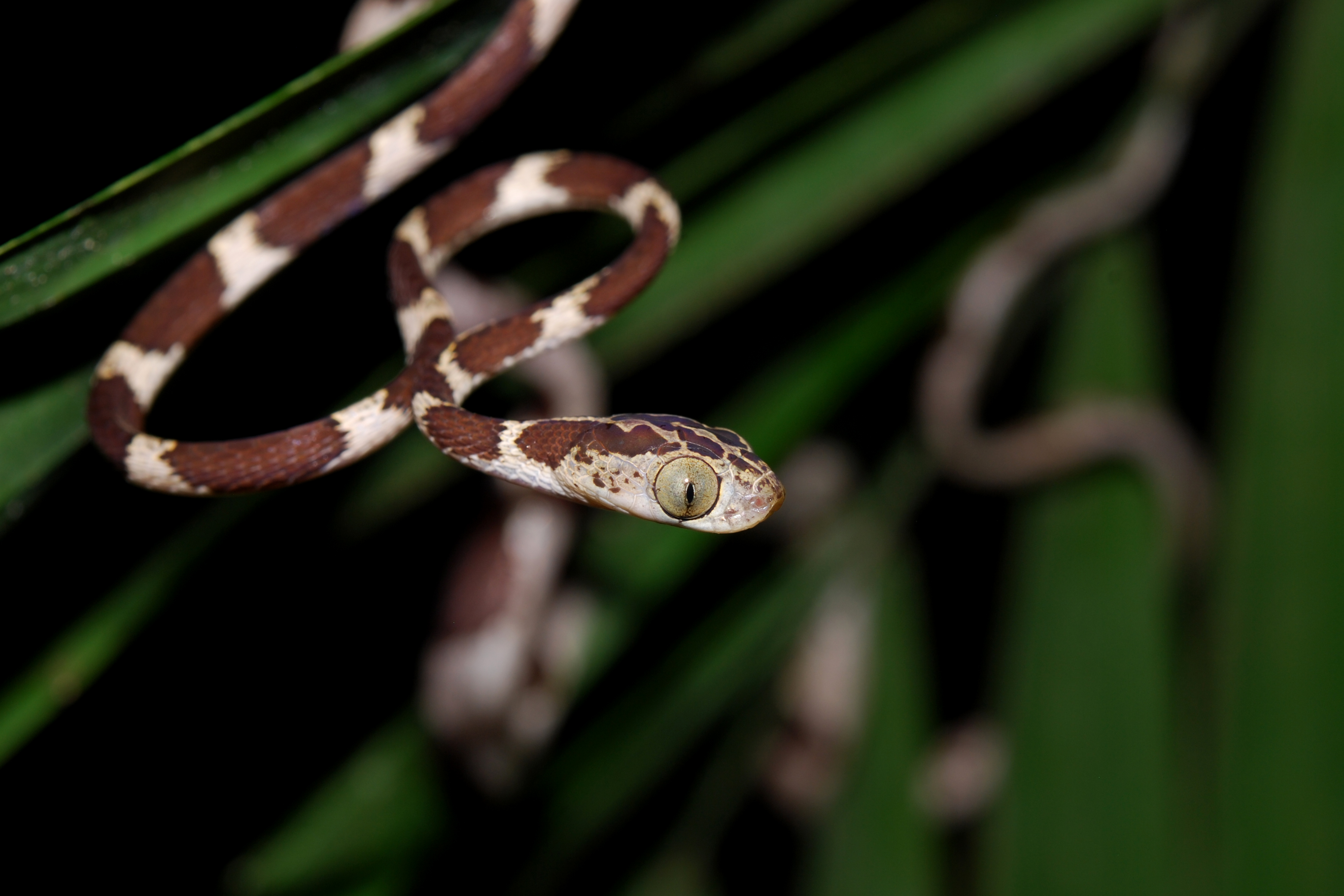
Imantodes cenchoa

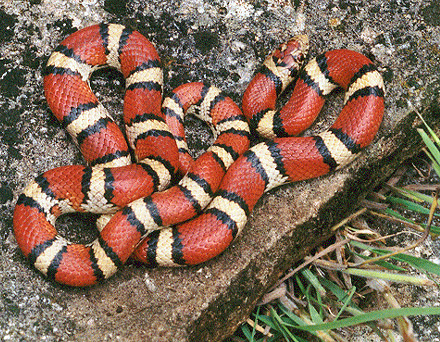
Lampropeltis triangulum

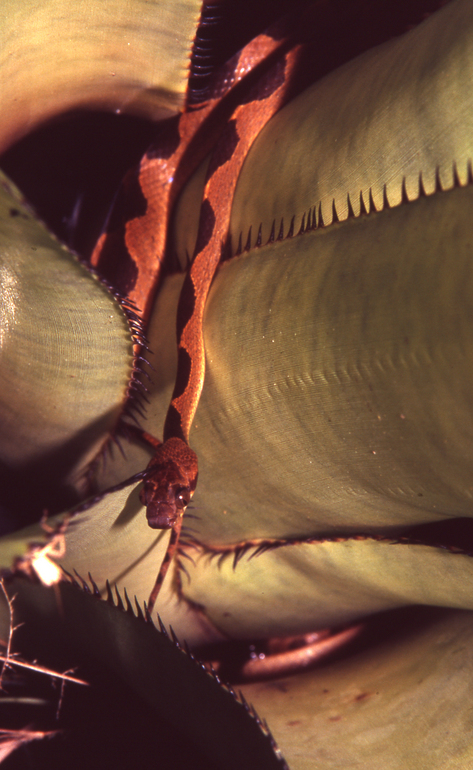
Leptodeira annulata

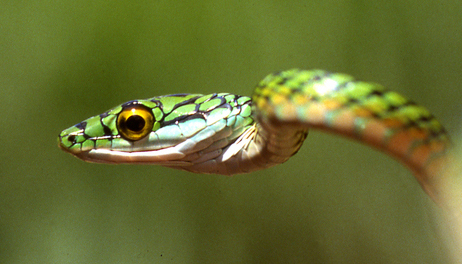
Leptophis ahaetulla

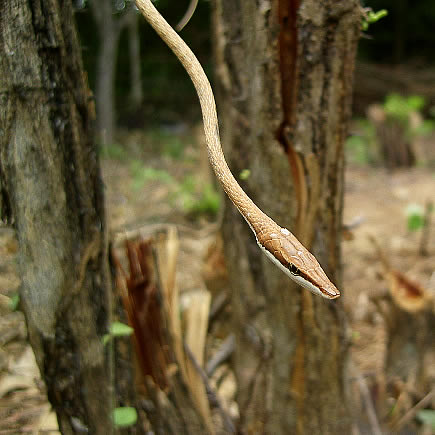
Oxybelis aeneus

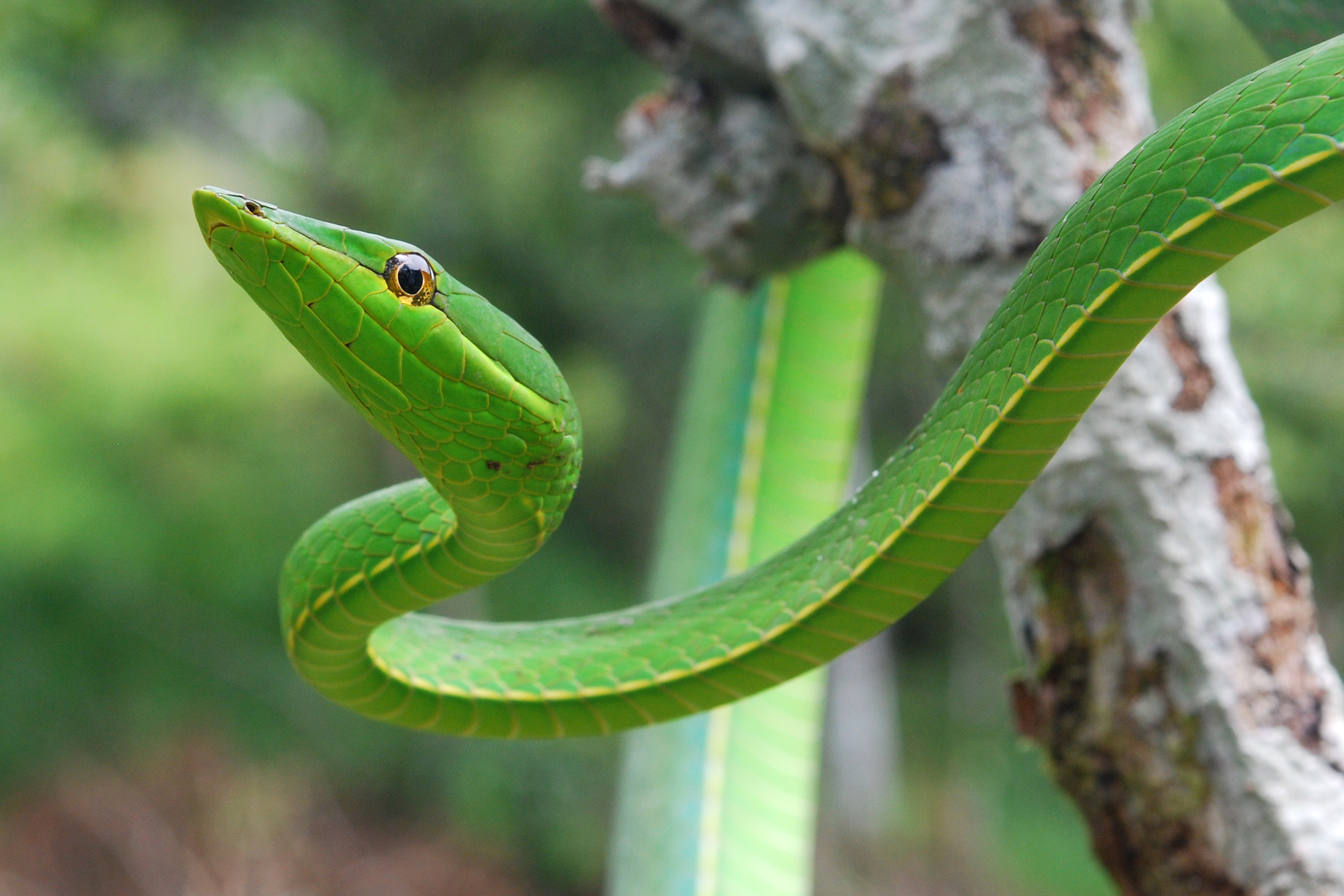
Oxybelis fulgidus

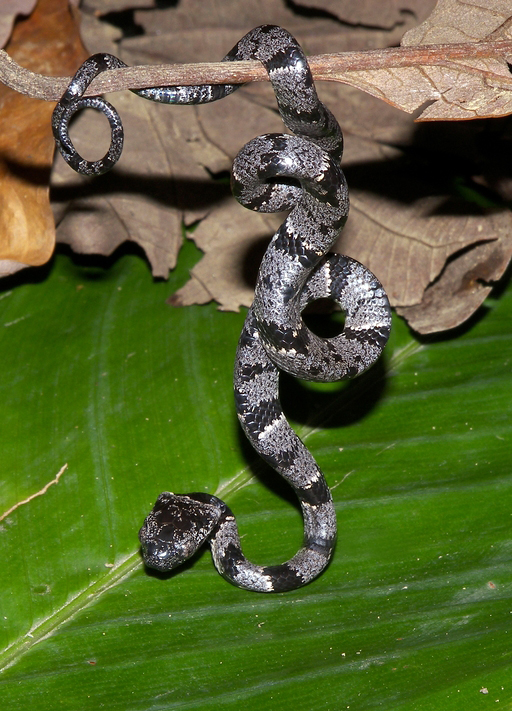
Sibon nebulata

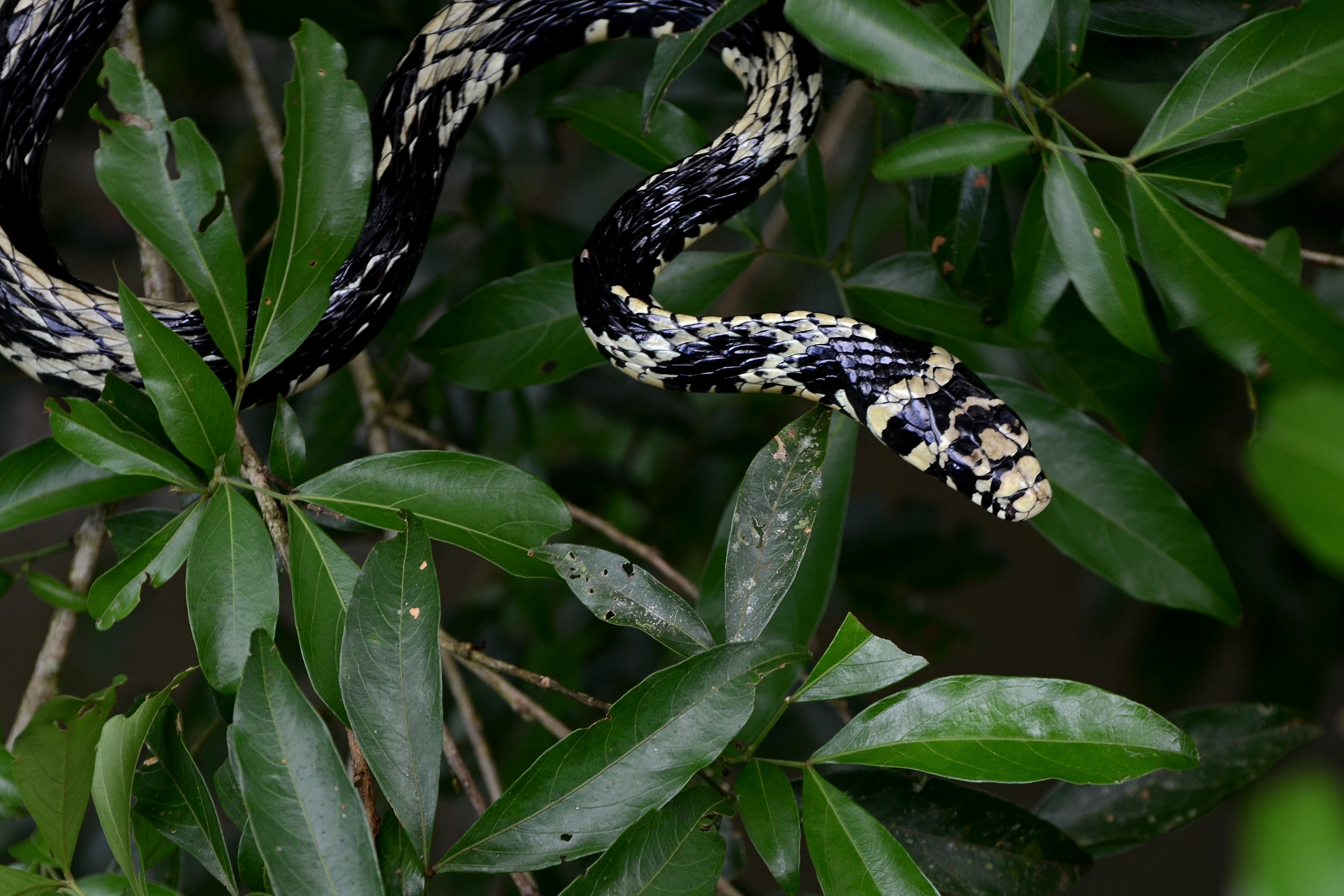
Spilotes pullatus

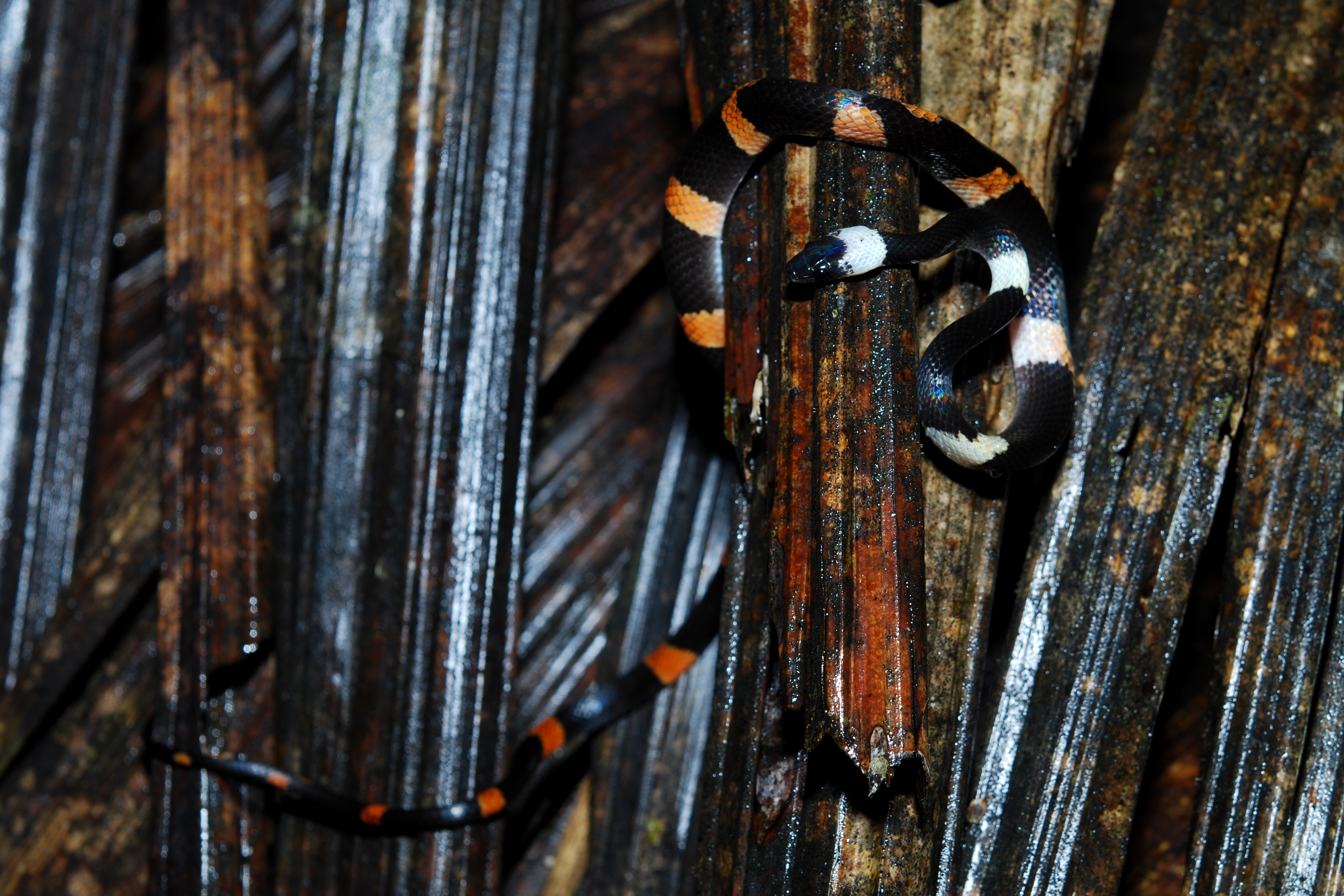
Spilotes pullatus

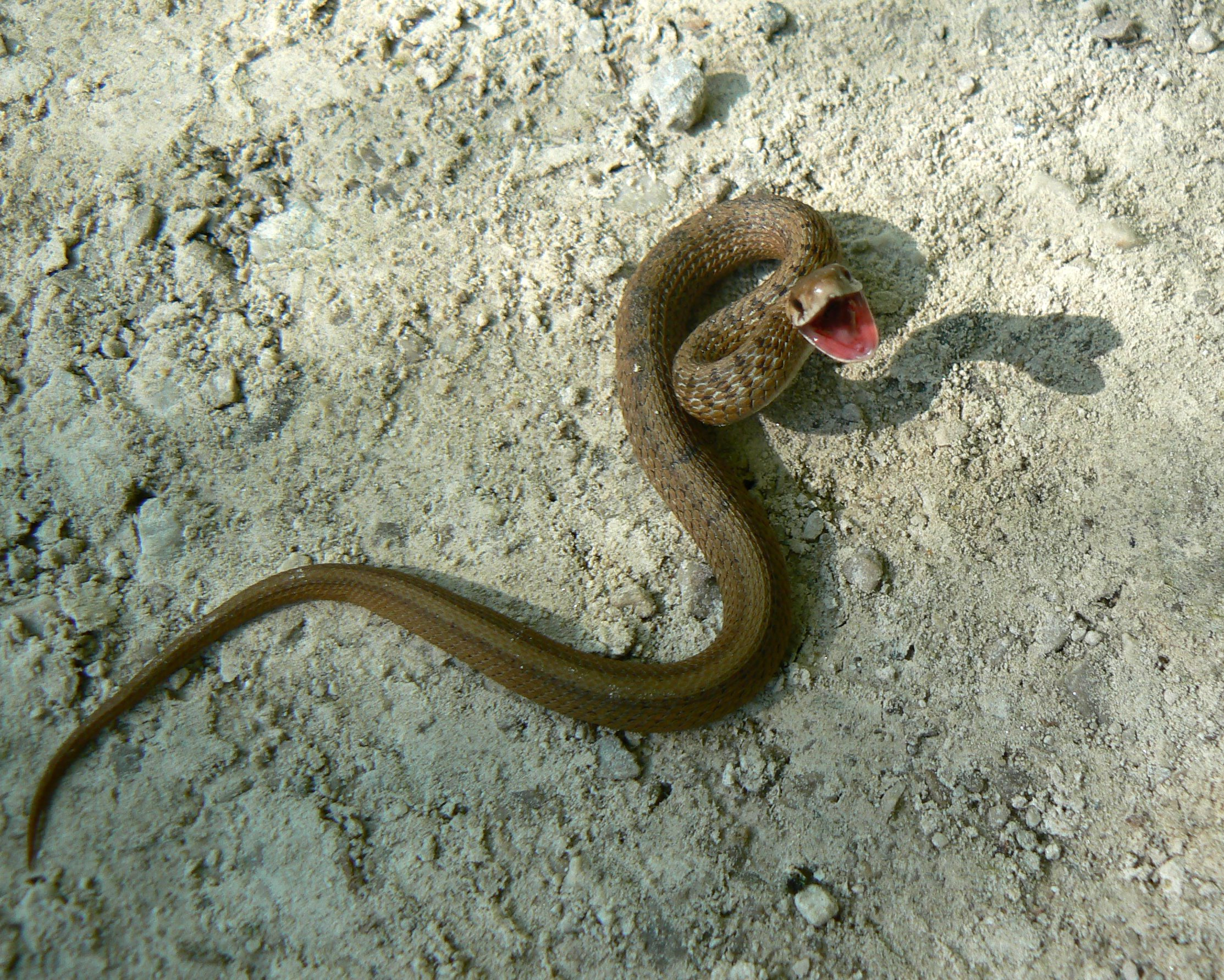
Storeria dekayi

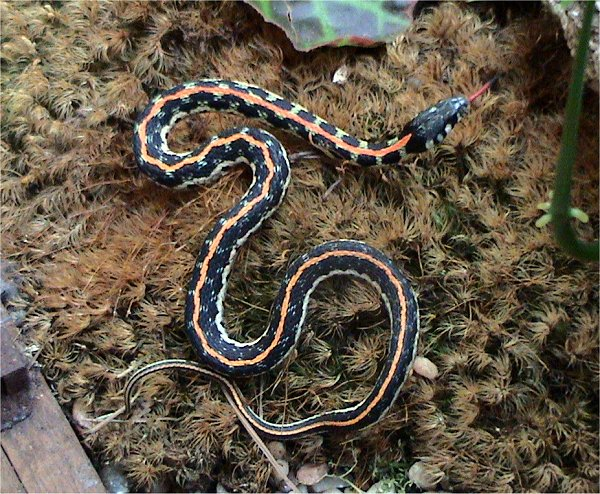
Thamnophis cyrtopsis

- Dary's burrowing snake – Adelphicos daryi Campbell and Ford, 1982 (EN)
- Adelphicos ibarrorum Campbell and Brodie, 1988
- Guatemala burrowing snake – Adelphicos veraepacis Stuart, 1941
- Middle American burrowing snake – Adelphicos quadrivirgatum Jan, 1862
- Rustyhead snake – Amastridium veliferum Cope, 1861
- Chapinophis xanthocheilus Campbell and Smith, 1998 (E)
- Mussurana – Clelia clelia Daudin, 1803
- Mexican snake eater – Clelia scytalina Cope, 1866
- Eastern racer – Coluber constrictor Linnaeus, 1758
- Two-spotted snake – Coniophanes bipunctatus Günther
- Yellowbelly snake – Coniophanes fissidens Günther
- Black-striped snake – Coniophanes imperialis (Kennicott, 1859)
- Cope's black-striped snake – Coniophanes piceivittis Cope, 1869
- Five-striped snake – Coniophanes quinquevittatus Duméril, Bibron, and Duméril, 1854
- Faded black-striped snake – Coniophanes schmidti Bailey, 1937
- Conophis lineatus Duméril, Bibron, and Duméril, 1854
- Crisantophis nevermanni (Dunn, 1937)
- Pink-tailed forest racer – Dendrophidion nuchalis (Peters, 1864
- Barred forest racer – Dendrophidion vinitor Smith, 1941
- Dipsas brevifacies (Cope, 1866)
- Dryadophis dorsalis (Bocourt, 1890)
- Dryadophis melanolomus (Cope, 1868)
- Eastern indigo snake – Drymarchon corais (Boie, 1827)
- Green highland racer – Drymobius chloroticus (Cope, 1886)
- Speckled racer – Drymobius margariterus (Schlegel, 1837)
- Mexican night snake – Elaphe flavirufa (Cope, 1867)
- Pacific longtail snake – Enulius flavitorques Cope, 1868
- Blotched hook-nosed snake – Ficimia publia Cope, 1866
- Chiapas earth snake – Geophis cancellatus Smith, 1941
- Keeled earth snake – Geophis carinosus Stuart, 1941
- Mertens' earth snake – Geophis fulvoguttatus Mertens, 1952
- Downs' earth snake – Geophis immaculatus Downs, 1967
- Coffee earth snake – Geophis nasalis Cope, 1868
- Rosebelly earth snake – Geophis rhodogaster (Cope, 1868)
- Costa Rica water snake – Hydromorphus concolor Peters, 1859
- Blunthead tree snake – Imantodes cenchoa (Linnaeus, 1758)
- Central American tree snake – Imantodes gemmistratus (Cope, 1861)
- Milk snake – Lampropeltis triangulum (Lacépède, 1789)
- Banded cat-eyed snake – Leptodeira annulata (Linnaeus, 1758)
- Rainforest cat-eyed snake – Leptodeira frenata (Cope, 1886)
- Black-banded cat-eyed snake – Leptodeira nigrofasciata Günther, 1868
- Leptodeira polysticta Günther, 1895 [Leptodeira septentrionalis polysticta]
- Striped lowland snake – Leptodrymus pulcherrimus (Cope, 1874)
- Parrot snake – Leptophis ahaetulla (Linnaeus, 1758)
- Mexican parrot snake – Leptophis mexicanus Duméril, Bibron, and Duméril, 1854
- Cloud forest parrot snake – Leptophis modestus (Günther, 1872)
- Masticophis mentovarius (Duméril, Bibron, and Duméril, 1854)
- Ringneck coffee snake – Ninia diademata Baird and Girard, 1853
- Ninia pavimentata (Bocourt, 1883)
- Redback coffee snake – Ninia sebae (Duméril, Bibron, and Duméril, 1854)
- Brown vine snake – Oxybelis aeneus (Wagler, 1830)
- Green vine snake – Oxybelis fulgidus (Daudin, 1803)
- False coral – Oxyrhopus petola (Linnaeus, 1758)
- Middle American gopher snake – Pituophis lineaticollis (Cope, 1861)
- Variegated false coral snake – Pliocercus elapoides Cope, 1860
- Puffing snake – Pseustes poecilonotus (Günther, 1858)
- Rhadinaea anachoreta Smith and Campbell, 1994
- Rhadinaea decorata (Günther, 1858)
- Godman's graceful brown snake – Rhadinaea godmani (Günther, 1865)
- Hannstein's spot-lipped snake – Rhadinaea hannsteini (Stuart, 1949)
- Hempstead's pine woods snake – Rhadinaea hempsteadae Stuart and Bailey, 1941
- Kinkelin graceful brown snake – Rhadinaea kinkelini Boettger, 1898
- Tearful pine-oak snake – Rhadinaea lachrymans (Cope, 1870)
- Monte Cristi graceful brown snake – Rhadinaea montecristi Mertens, 1952
- Stuart's graceful brown snake – Rhadinaea pilonaorum (Stuart, 1954)
- Posada's graceful brown snake – Rhadinaea posadasi (Slevin, 1936)
- Rhadinaea stadelmani Stuart and Bailey, 1941
- Guatemala neckband snake – Scaphiodontophis annulatus (Duméril, Bibron, and Duméril, 1854)
- Black-banded snake – Scolecophis atrocinctus (Schlegel, 1837)
- Senticollis triaspis (Cope, 1866)
- Cope's snail sucker – Sibon anthracops (Cope, 1868)
- Carr's snail sucker – Sibon carri (Shreve, 1951)
- Sibon dimidiata (Günther, 1872)
- Sibon fischeri (Boulenger, 1894)
- Sibon nebulata (Linnaeus, 1758)
- Sibon sanniola (Cope, 1867)
- Sibon sartorii (Cope, 1863)
- Chicken snake – Spilotes pullatus (Linnaeus, 1758)
- Stenorrhina degenhardti (Berthold, 1846)
- Stenorrhina freminvillii Duméril, Bibron, and Duméril, 1854
- Brown snake – Storeria dekayi (Holbrook, 1842)
- Yucatán white-lipped snake – Symphimus mayae (Gaige, 1936)
- Baird's black-headed snake – Tantilla bairdi Stuart, 1941
- Mertens' centipede snake – Tantilla brevicauda Mertens, 1952
- Peten centipede snake – Tantilla cuniculator Smith, 1939
- Jan's centipede snake – Tantilla jani (Günther, 1895)
- Tantilla impensa Campbell, 1998
- Equator centipede snake – Tantilla melanocephala (Linnaeus, 1758)
- Blackbelly centipede snake – Tantilla moesta (Günther, 1863)
- Big bend black-headed snake – Tantilla rubra Cope, 1876
- Red earth centipede snake – Tantilla schistosa (Bocourt, 1883)
- Central American centipede snake – Tantilla taeniata (Bocourt, 1883)
- Volcan Tacana centipede snake – Tantilla tayrae Wilson, 1983
- Tantilla tecta Campbell and Smith, 1998
- Tantilla vulcani Campbell, 1998
- Speckled dwarf short-tail snake – Tantillita brevissima (Taylor, 1937)
- Yucatecan dwarf short-tail snake – Tantillita canula (Cope, 1876)
- Linton's dwarf short-tail snake – Tantillita lintoni (Smith, 1940)
- Blackneck garter snake – Thamnophis cyrtopsis (Kennicott, 1860)
- Highland garter snake – Thamnophis fulvus (Bocourt, 1893)
- Checkered garter snake – Thamnophis marcianus (Baird and Girard, 1853)
- Western ribbon snake – Thamnophis proximus (Say, 1823)
- Orangebelly swamp snake – Tretanorhinus nigroluteus Cope 1861
- Western lyre snake – Trimorphodon biscutatus (Duméril and Bibron, 1854)
- False Fer-de-lance – Xenodon rabdocephalus (Wied, 1824)

=== Elapidae ===
Order: Squamata. Family: Elapidae

Elapidae is a family of venomous snakes found in tropical and subtropical regions around the world, terrestrially in Asia, Australia, Africa, North America and South America and aquatically in the Pacific and Indian Oceans. Elapid snakes exist in a wide range of sizes, from 18 cm species of Drysdalia to the 5.6 m king cobra, and are characterized by hollow, fixed fangs through which they inject venom from glands located towards the rear of the upper jaws. In outward appearance terrestrial elapids look similar to the Colubridae: almost all have long and slender bodies with smooth scales, a head that is covered with large shields and not always distinct from the neck, and eyes with round pupils. In addition, their behavior is usually quite active and most are oviparous. Currently, 61 genera that include 325 species are recognized worldwide. Eight species of Elapid snake occur in Guatemala, seven of which are coral snakes and one a sea snake.

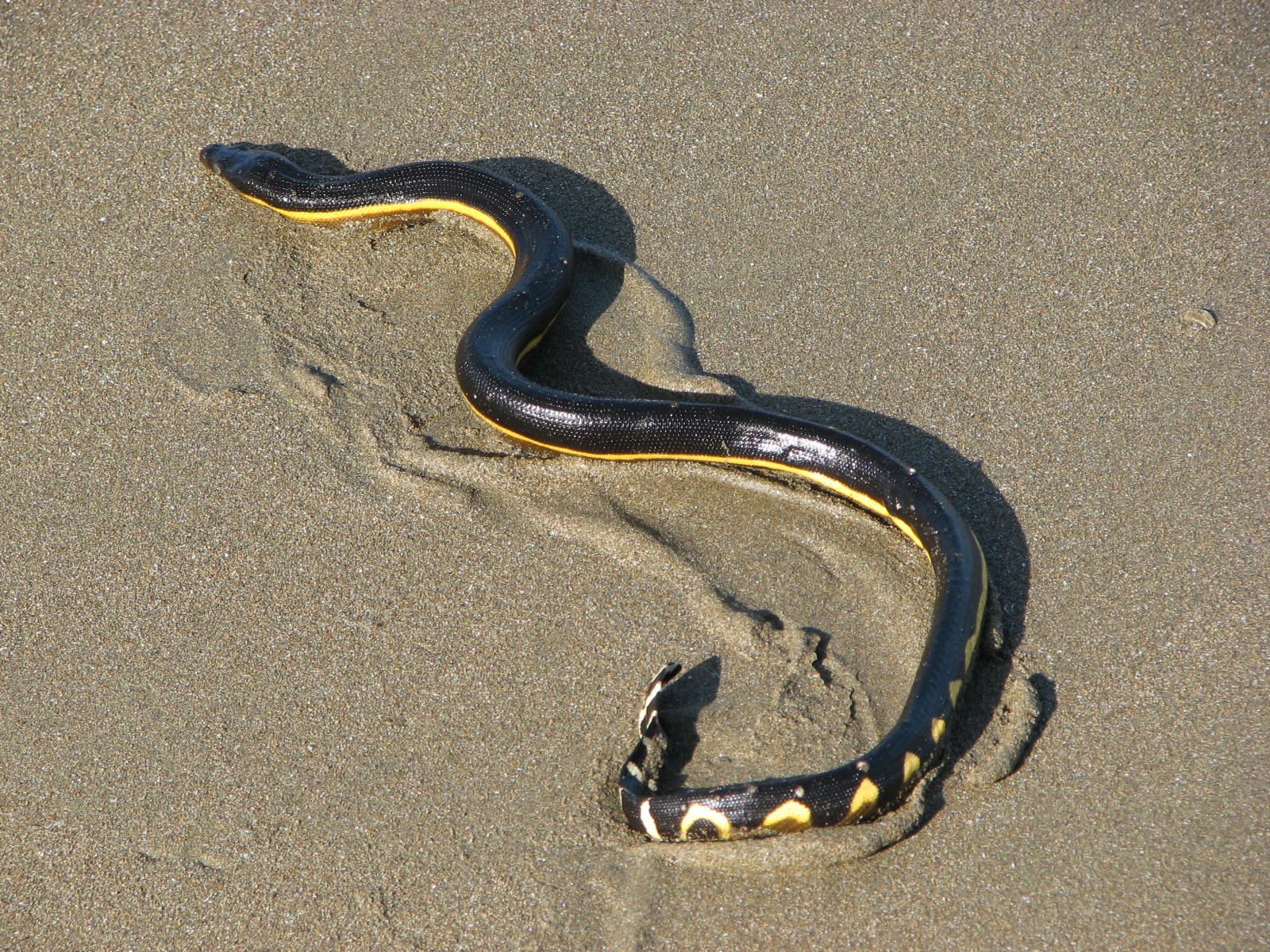
Pelamis platurus

- Brown's coral snake – Micrurus browni Schmidt and Smith, 1943
- Variable coral snake – Micrurus diastema (Duméril, Bibron, and Duméril, 1854)
- Elegant coral snake – Micrurus elegans (Jan, 1858)
- Mayan coral snake – Micrurus hippocrepis (Peters, 1862)
- Micrurus latifasciatus Schmidt, 1933
- Central American coral snake – Micrurus nigrocinctus (Girard, 1854)
- Stuart's coral snake – Micrurus stuarti Roze, 1967
- Yellow-bellied sea snake – Pelamis platurus (Linnaeus, 1766)

=== Viperidae ===
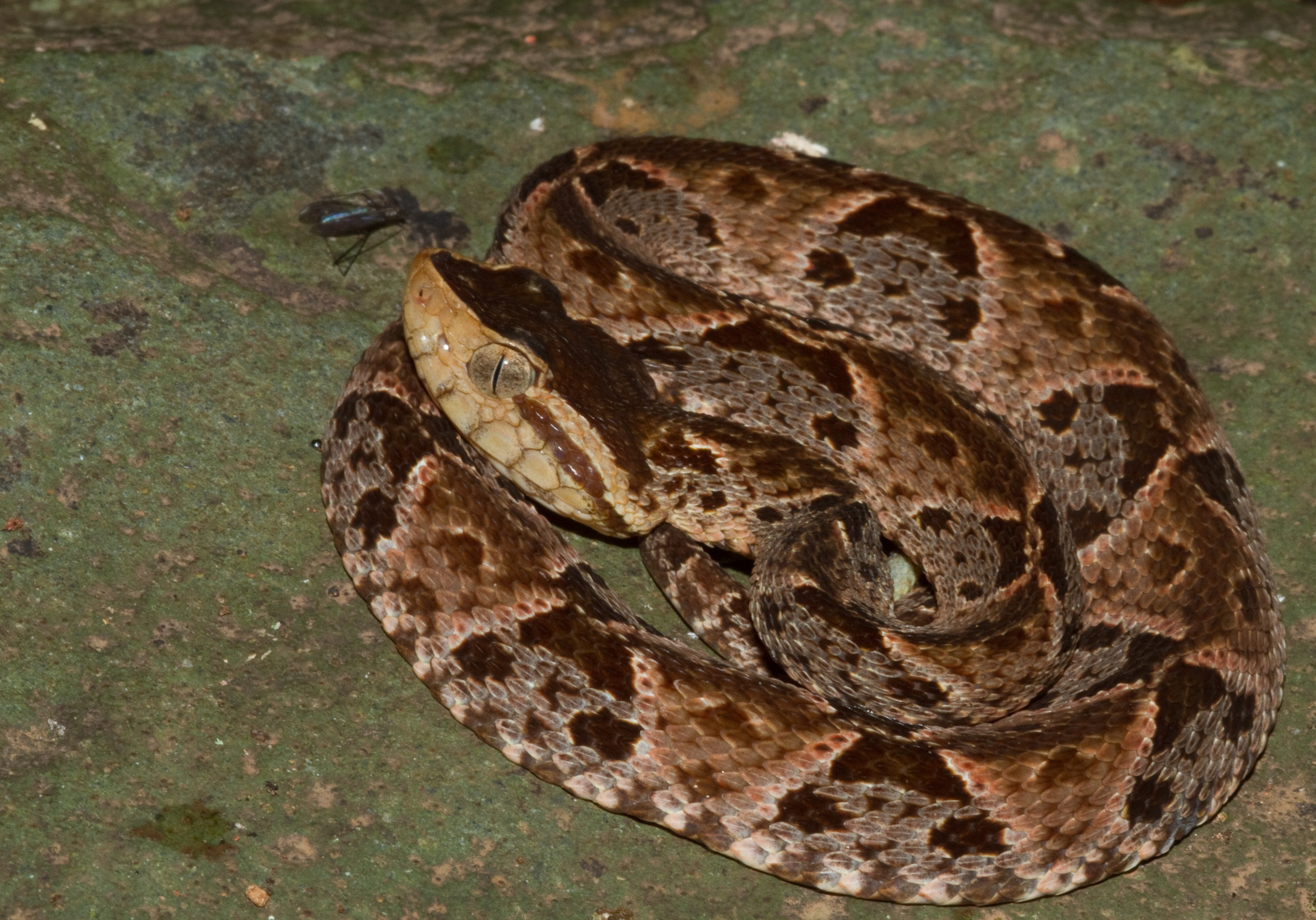
Bothrops asper

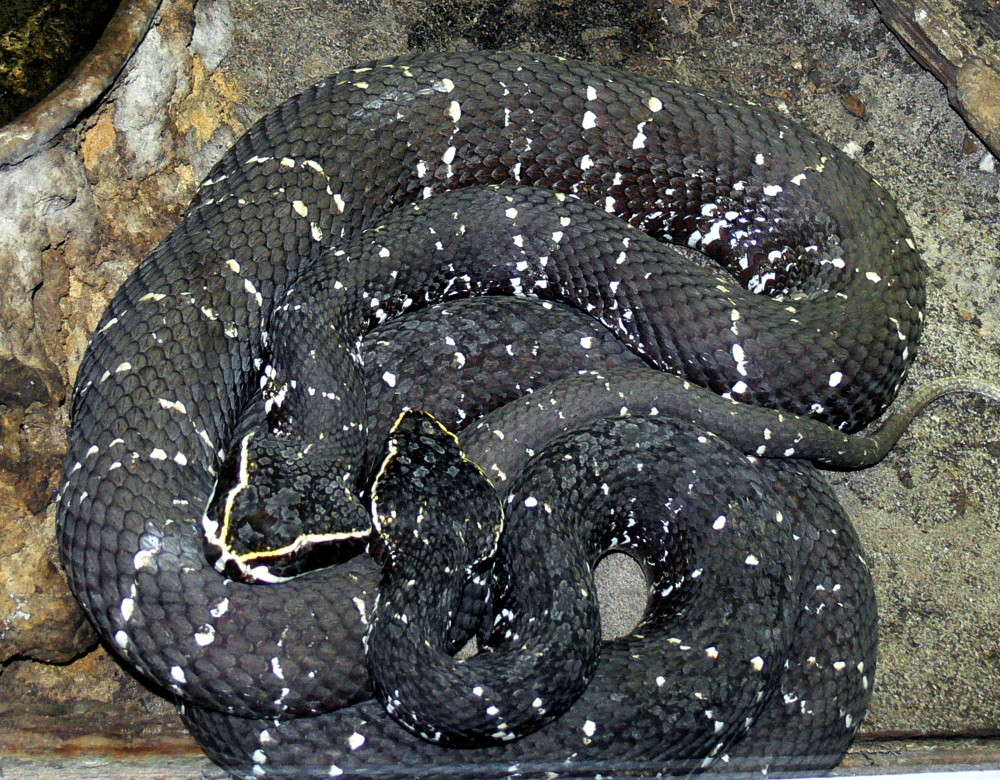
Agkistrodon bilineatus

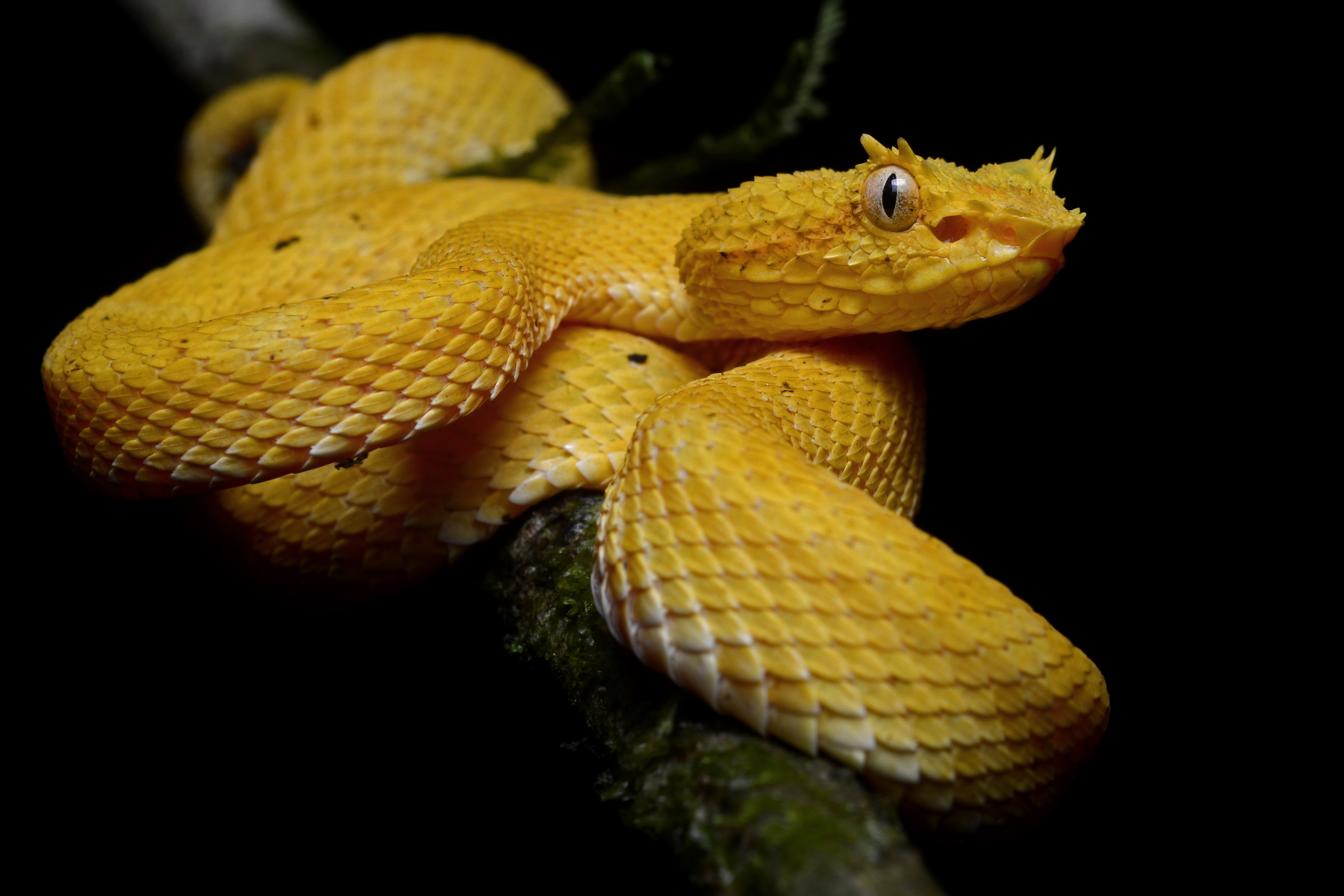
Bothriechis nigroadspersus

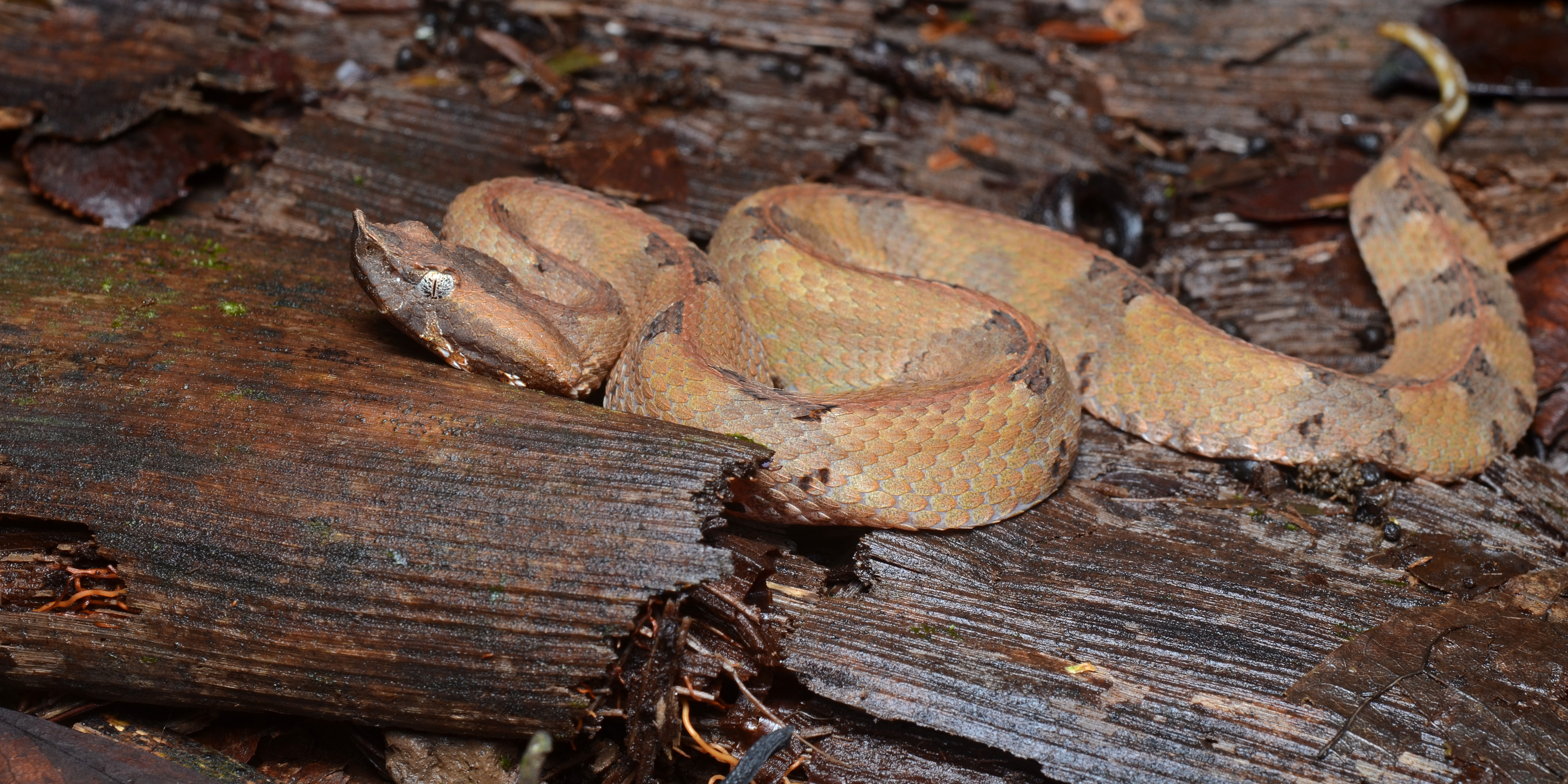
Porthidium nasutum

Order: Squamata. Family: Viperidae

The Viperidae are a family of venomous snakes found all over the world, except in Antarctica, Australia, Ireland, Madagascar, Hawaii, various other isolated islands, and north of the Arctic Circle. All have relatively long, hinged fangs that permit deep penetration and injection of venom. Four subfamilies are currently recognized. The subfamily Crotalinae, commonly known as "pit vipers", are the only viperids found in the Americas. They are distinguished by the presence of a heat-sensing pit organ located between the eye and the nostril on either side of the head. Currently, 18 genera and 151 species are recognized: 7 genera and 54 species in the Old World, against a greater diversity of 11 genera and 97 species in the New World. Of these, 6 genera and 13 species are found in Guatemala.

- Cantil – Agkistrodon bilineatus Günther, 1863
- Mexican jumping pitviper – Atropoides nummifer (Rüppel)
- Guatemalan jumping pitviper – Atropoides occiduus (Hoge, 1966)
- Guatemalan palm viper – Bothriechis aurifer (Salvin, 1860)
- Guatemalan tree viper – Bothriechis bicolor (Bocourt, 1868)
- Eyelash viper – Bothriechis schlegelii (Berthold, 1846)
- Honduran palm-pitviper – Bothriechis marchi (Barbour & Loveridge, 1929)
- Merendon palm-pitviper – Bothriechis thalassinus (Campbell & Smith, 2000)
- Terciopelo – Bothrops asper (Garman, 1883)
- Godman's pit viper – Cerrophidion godmani (Günther)
- Rainforest hognosed pitviper – Porthidium nasutum (Bocourt, 1868)
- Slender hognosed pitviper – Porthidium ophryomegas (Bocourt, 1868)
- Middle American rattlesnake – Crotalus simus Latreille In Sonnini & Latreille, 1801

== See also ==
- List of amphibians of Guatemala
- List of birds of Guatemala
- List of mammals of Guatemala
