= L. bakeri =

L. bakeri may refer to:

- Leptodeira bakeri, Ruthven, 1936, the Baker's cat-eyed snake, a snake species in the genus Leptodeira
- Leptoporus bakeri, a synonym for Rigidoporus microporus, a plant pathogen
- Limnanthes bakeri, the Baker's meadowfoam, a rare plant species endemic to Mendocino County, California

== See also ==
- Bakeri (disambiguation)
