= List of reptiles of the Netherlands =

This list of reptiles of the Netherlands is extracted from the Reptile Database. It applies to the Kingdom of the Netherlands. Species not endemic to constituent country in western Europe are indicated by inclusion of their distribution within the kingdom.

== Turtles and terrapins ==
- Loggerhead sea turtle, Caretta caretta (Linnaeus, 1758)
- Green sea turtle, Chelonia mydas (Linnaeus, 1758)
- Leatherback sea turtle, Dermochelys coriacea (Vandelli, 1761)
- European pond turtle, Emys orbicularis (Linnaeus, 1758)
- Hawksbill sea turtle, Eretmochelys imbricata (Linnaeus, 1766)
- Pond slider, Trachemys scripta (Thunberg in Schoepff, 1792)

== Lizards ==
- Slow worm, Anguis fragilis Linnaeus, 1758
- Sand lizard, Lacerta agilis Linnaeus, 1758
- Common wall lizard, Podarcis muralis (Laurenti, 1768)
- Viviparous lizard, Zootoca vivipara (Lichtenstein, 1823)

== Snakes ==
- Anguilla bank racer, Alsophis rijgersmaei Cope, 1869 – St. Maarten
- Red-bellied racer, Alsophis rufiventris (Duméril, Bibron & Duméril, 1854) — Saba and Sint Eustatius
- Smooth snake, Coronella austriaca Laurenti, 1768
- Russian rat snake, Elaphe schrenckii (Strauch, 1873)
- Three-scaled groundsnake, Erythrolamprus triscalis (Linnaeus, 1758) – Curacao
- Baker's cat-eyed snake, Leptodeira bakeri (Ruthven, 1936) – Aruba
- Barred grass snake, Natrix helvetica (Lacépède, 1789)
- Grass snake, Natrix natrix (Linnaeus, 1758) (probably introduced)
- Common European adder, Vipera berus (Linnaeus, 1758)
