= Agate Lake =

Reservoir in Jackson County, Oregon, United States

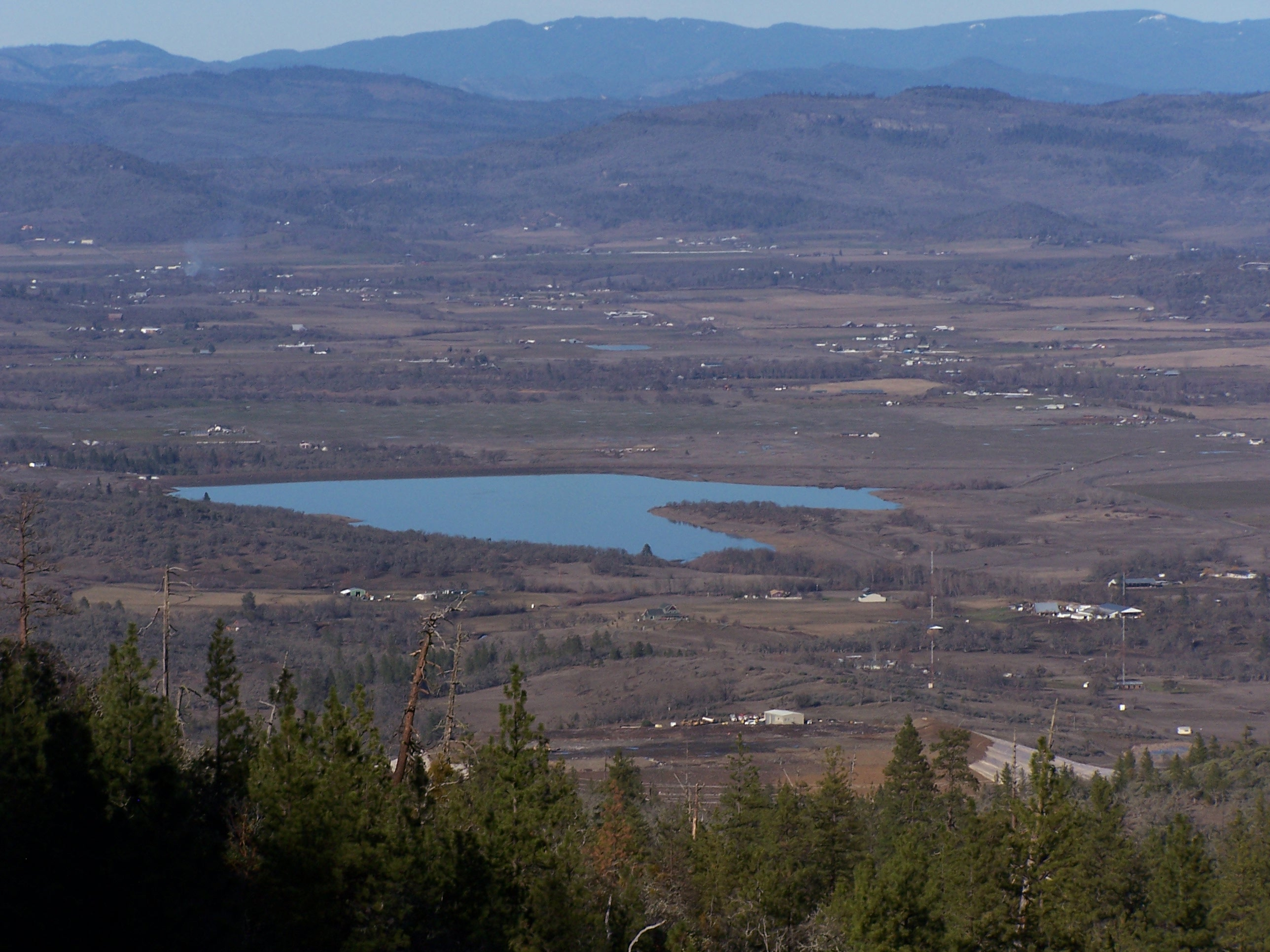
- Agate Lake from Roxy Ann Peak

- Location within Oregon Location within the United States

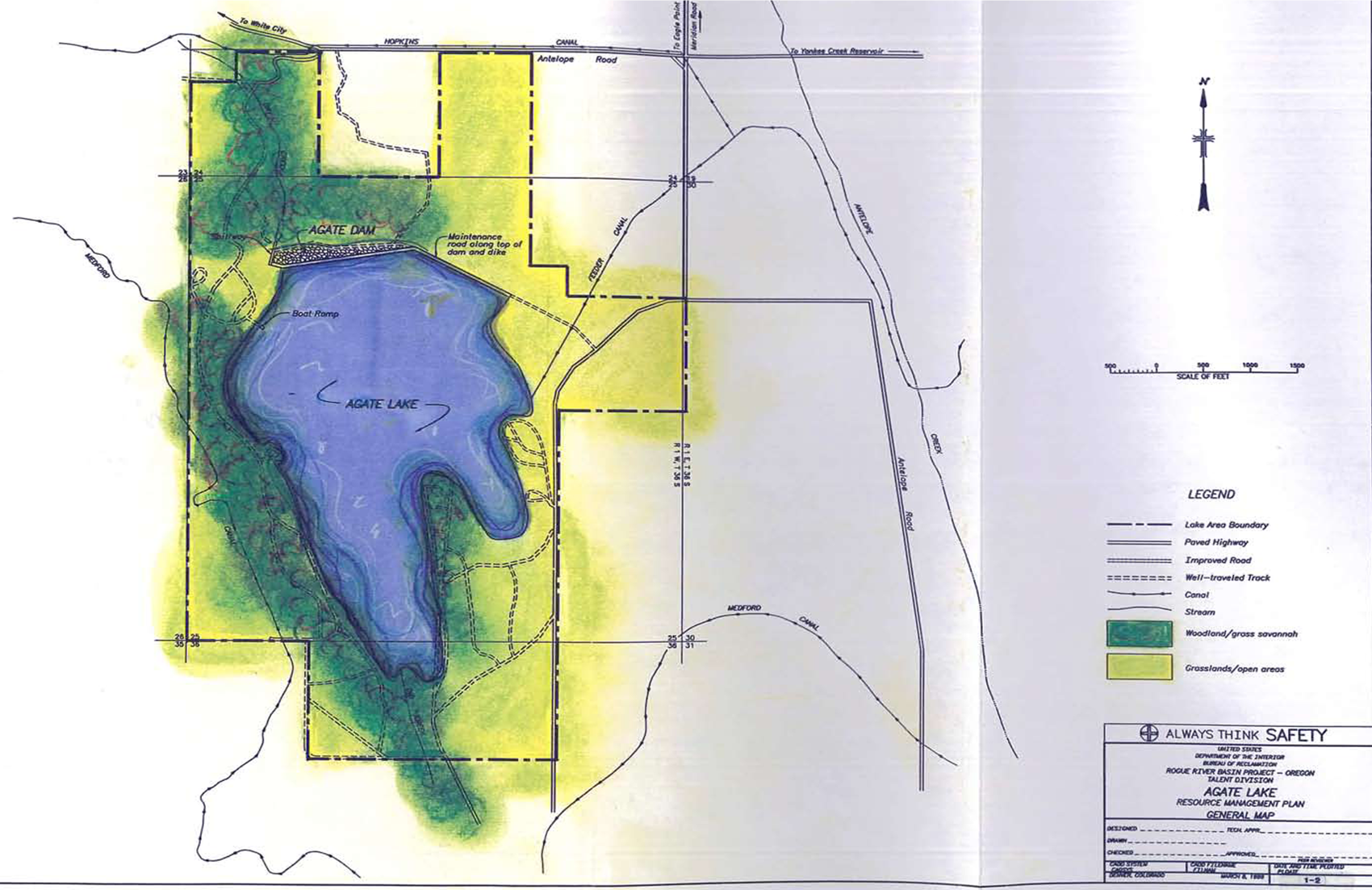
- A map of Agate Lake
- Location: Jackson County, Oregon
- Coordinates: 42°24′39.05″N 122°46′13.65″W
- Type: Reservoir
- Primary inflows: Dry Creek, Antelope Creek (Note: Via a constructed canal for seasonal runoff.)
- Primary outflows: Dry Creek
- Basin countries: United States
- Surface area: 216 acres (0.87 km^{2})
- Average depth: 68 feet (21 m)
- Max. depth: 72 feet (22 m) (Note: Crest of spillway)
- Water volume: 4,782 acre-feet (5,899,000 m^{3})
- Shore length^{1}: 3 miles (4.8 km)
- Surface elevation: 1,510 feet (460 m)
- ^{1} Shore length is not a well-defined measure.

Agate Lake is a reservoir located 1,510 feet (460 m) above sea level in Jackson County, Oregon, United States. It is 13 miles (21 km) northeast of Medford, just north of Roxy Ann Peak. The lake is formed by the 86-foot (26 m) tall Agate Dam, which impounds Dry Creek, in the Rogue River watershed.

== History ==
Construction of Agate Dam was authorized in 1962, started in 1965, and completed in 1966. The 86-foot (26 m) tall earth-fill embankment dam was completed by the Talent Division of the Rogue River Basin Project, impounding Dry Creek. Two canals were also built, one a feeder canal diverting seasonal runoff water from Hopkins canal fed from nearby Antelope Creek. The second is the Dry Creek Diversion Canal through which the reservoir water is released at a controlled rate beginning in the summer months supplementing the water supplies of Dry Creek, Antelope Creek, and eventually Little Butte Creek. This water is mainly used for irrigation and the demand for it downstream is normally enough to reduce the reservoir to its minimum allowable level by September each year. A boat ramp, four pit toilets, a picnic area, and a parking lot were also built. All but the boat ramp and parking lot have been removed due to excessive vandalism. There are three parking areas one on the north west side and two on the east side of the lake .

== Statistics ==
Agate Lake receives approximately 23 inches (580 mm) of precipitation annually. Temperatures average from highs of 89 °F (32 °C) in the summer to lows of 22 °F (−6 °C) in the winter. The average wind speed in the area is 10 to 15 miles per hour (16 to 24 km/h).

Agate Lake has an average surface area of 216 acres (0.87 km^{2}), and an average volume of 4,782 acre-feet (5,899,000 m^{3}). It is located 1,510 feet (460 m) above sea level, although the water level fluctuates as much as 25 feet (7.6 m) throughout the year. It has approximately 3 miles (4.8 km) of shoreline. The spillway has a capacity of 3,300 cubic feet per second (93 m^{3}/s).

Agate Dam is 86 feet (26 m) tall, 25 feet (7.6 m) wide, and 3,800 feet (1,200 m) long.

== Flora and fauna ==
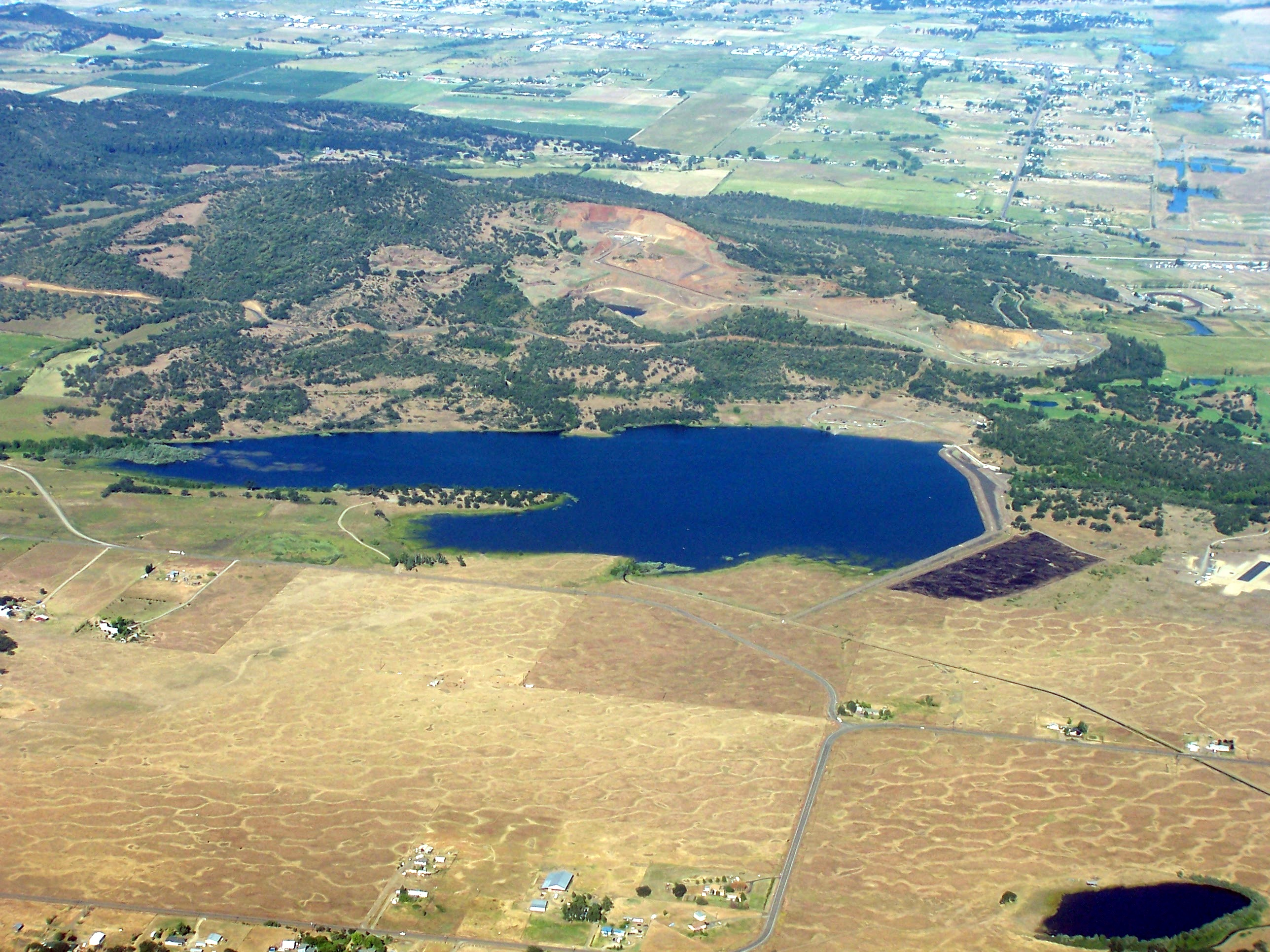
An aerial image of Agate Lake

Dry Creek was intermittent prior to the construction of Agate Dam, and did not have any significant fish population. Upstream (to the south of Agate Lake) trees such as willows, cottonwoods, and alders grow in Dry Creek's riparian zone. To the north of Agate Lake blackberries, willows, alders, madrones, white oaks, and ponderosa pine inhabit this zone.

Vegetation on the west side of the lake is mostly oak savanna, with many white oak and madrone trees. The most commons shrubs include buckbrush and occasionally poison oak. The south side consists of mainly grassland. Invasive species such as star thistle, cheat grass, and teasel have invaded these areas. To the northwest is more grassland, featuring vernal pools in the spring. When filled, the pools are a known habitat for a threatened species of fairy shrimp, (branchinecta lynchi), which can be found in the winter and early spring. The rare big-flowered woolly meadowfoam can also be found in these pools. They are endemic to the Agate Desert region.

Black-tailed deer inhabit the area in the spring, summer, and fall. Over 190 species of birds have been spotted around the lake.
Fish such as largemouth bass, smallmouth bass, bluegill, catfish, and crappie live in the lake.

== Recreation ==
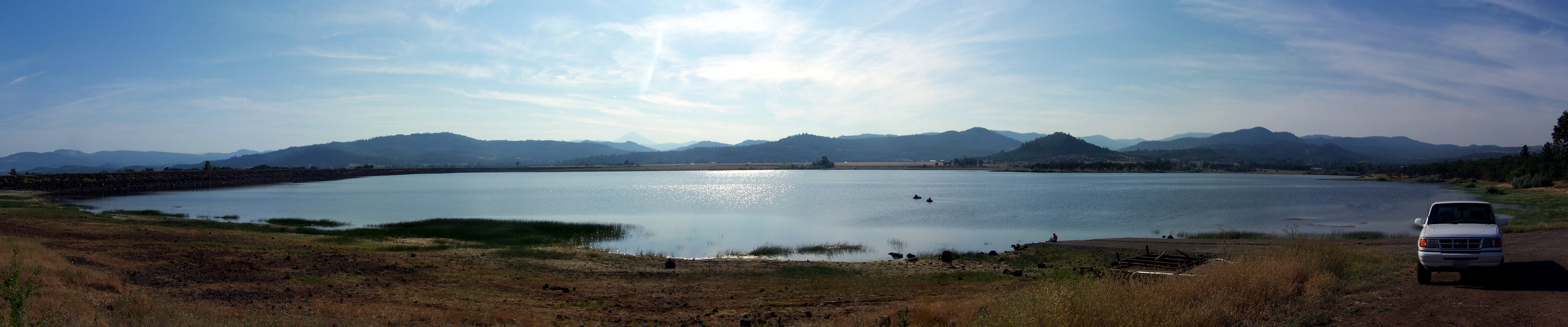
A panorama of Agate Lake

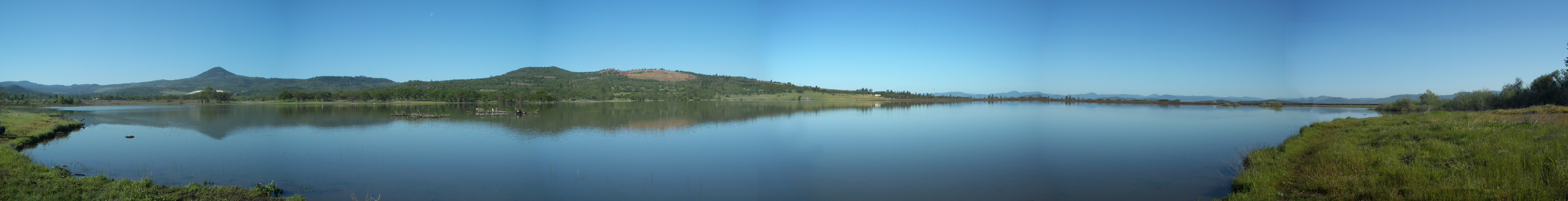
Panorama from east side of Agate Lake

Only non motorized and electric motor boats are allowed on the Lake. Swimming, angling, rock hunting and picnicking are also popular activities. In the late summer and early fall, when the lake recedes, agates and petrified wood can be found.

The Jackson County Parks Department estimates that approximately 5,000 people visit the lake annually.

== See also ==
- List of lakes in Oregon
