= Limnanthes douglasii subsp. striata =

Scientific classification
- Kingdom: Plantae
- Clade: Tracheophytes
- Clade: Angiosperms
- Clade: Eudicots
- Clade: Rosids
- Order: Brassicales
- Family: Limnanthaceae
- Genus: Limnanthes
- Species: L. douglasii
- Subspecies: L. d. subsp. striata

Trinomial name
- Limnanthes douglasii subsp. striata (Jeps.) Morin

Synonyms
- Limnanthes striata Jeps.

Subspecies of flowering plant

Limnanthes striata was formerly a species of meadowfoam known by the common name foothill meadowfoam. It has recently been subsumed into the species Limnanthes douglasii in both the Jepson Manual and the Flora of North America. This plant is endemic to California, where it is known from the Sierra Nevada foothills and the southern Klamath Mountains. It grows in wet, grassy habitat, carpeting the edges of vernal pools and ephemeral creeks.

== Description ==
Foothill meadowfoam is an annual herb producing a spreading stem up to about 30 centimeters long. The leaves are made up of several linear to oval-shaped lobed or unlobed leaflets each up to 2 centimeters long. The funnel-shaped flower has veined white petals with yellow bases.
