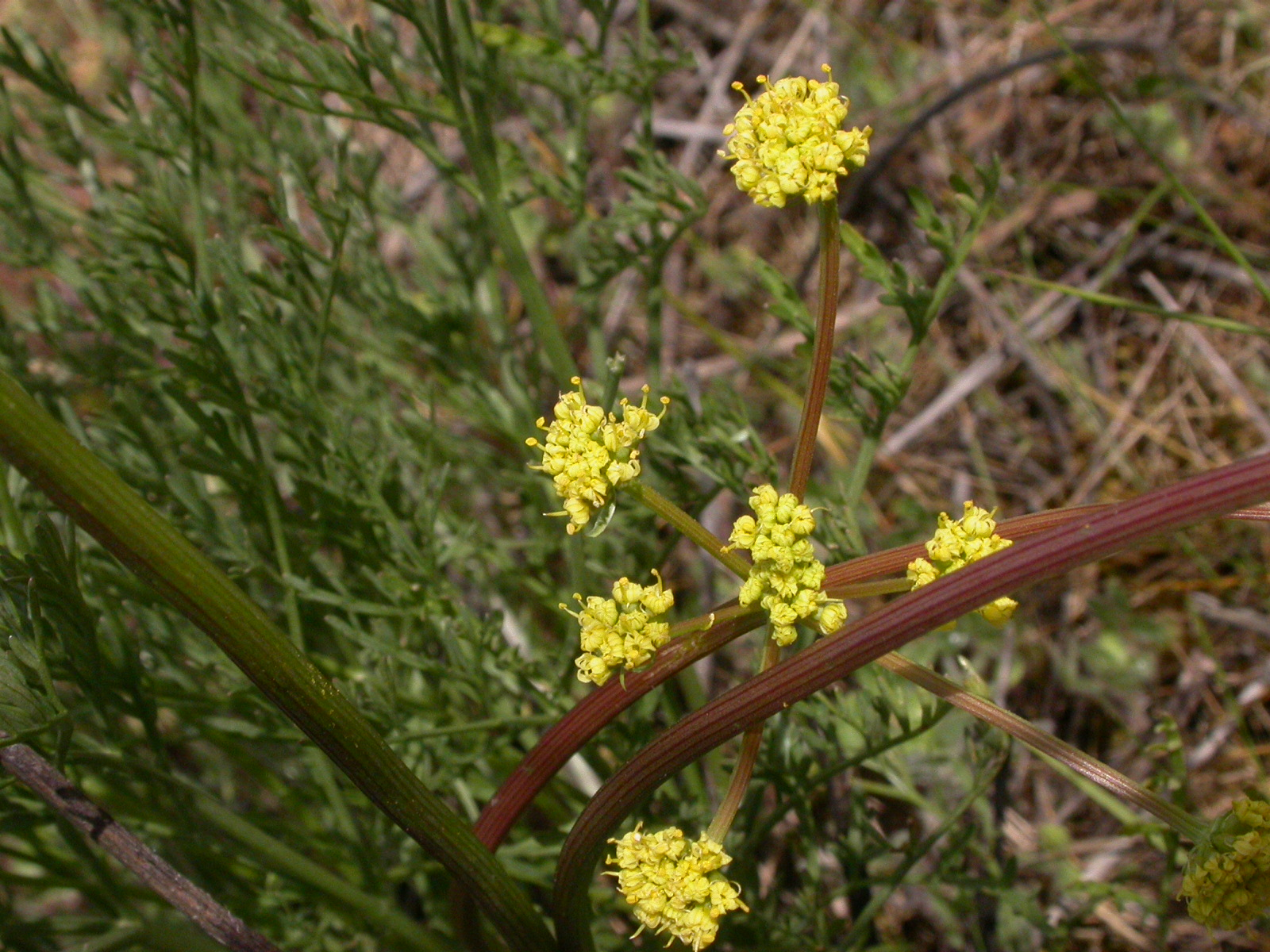

Conservation status
- Critically Imperiled (NatureServe)

Scientific classification
- Kingdom: Plantae
- Clade: Tracheophytes
- Clade: Angiosperms
- Clade: Eudicots
- Clade: Asterids
- Order: Apiales
- Family: Apiaceae
- Genus: Lomatium
- Species: L. cookii

Binomial name
- Lomatium cookii J.S.Kagan

= Lomatium cookii =

Species of flowering plant

Lomatium cookii is a rare species of flowering plant in the carrot family known by the common names Cook's lomatium and agate desertparsley. It is endemic to Oregon in the United States, where it grows in only two valleys. It is a federally listed endangered species.

This plant was first collected in 1981 during a survey for the rare Limnanthes floccosa ssp. grandiflora, the big-flowered woolly meadowfoam. It was described as a new species in 1986. The plant grows only in the Agate Desert of Jackson County and the Illinois Valley of Josephine County in southwestern Oregon. It occurs in vernally wet habitat types, including vernal pools and adjacent mounds and wet floodplains. One population of the plant occurs at Rogue Valley International-Medford Airport, where soil has been deposited over hardpan such that conditions are similar to vernal pool margins, allowing it to take hold there. Other plants that can be found in the vernal pool and floodplain habitat types include Limnanthes floccosa (woolly meadowfoam), Alopecurus geniculatus (water foxtail), Deschampsia danthonioides (annual hairgrass), Danthonia californica (California oatgrass), Poa scabrella (pine bluegrass), and Brodiaea spp. (brodiaeas or clusterlilies).

== Description ==
This is a perennial herb growing 10 to 40 centimeters (3.9 to 15.7 in) or 50 centimeters (20 in) tall. The leaves are located around the base of the stem. They have blades up to 17 centimeters (6.7 in) long that are intricately dissected into many small, narrow lobes. The inflorescence is an umbel bearing clusters of yellow flowers on several ascending branches. The fruit is roughly 1 centimeter (0.39 in) by 0.5 centimeters (0.20 in) wide and is lined with thick, corky wings.

== Endangered species ==
This plant was added to the Endangered Species List in 2002 because it is rare and its habitat is being destroyed and degraded. Vernal pools have nearly disappeared from an area where they were once widespread in this section of Oregon as the land has been consumed for agriculture, pastures, residential tracts, industrial operations, and commercial areas. Land not directly destroyed has been altered in such a way that its hydrology no longer supports vernal pool ecosystems. The blacktop of roads and parking lots produces runoff, and irrigation and ditches distribute water differently. Additionally, habitat fragmentation has occurred as the land was sectioned for use and bisected by roads and other structures. In 2002 the plant was known from only 15 sites in Jackson County and 21 sites in Josephine County.
