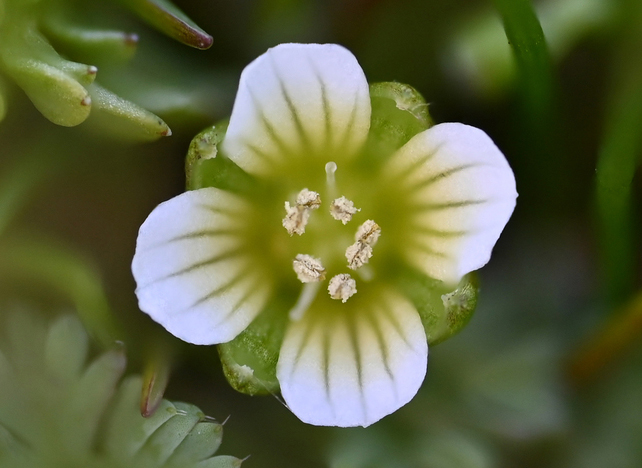

Conservation status
- Imperiled (NatureServe)

Scientific classification
- Kingdom: Plantae
- Clade: Tracheophytes
- Clade: Angiosperms
- Clade: Eudicots
- Clade: Rosids
- Order: Brassicales
- Family: Limnanthaceae
- Genus: Limnanthes
- Section: Limnanthes sect. Limnanthes
- Species: L. macounii

Binomial name
- Limnanthes macounii Trel.

= Limnanthes macounii =

Species of flowering plant

Limnanthes macounii, or Macoun's meadowfoam, is an endangered meadowfoam. It is a narrow endemic of south-western British Columbia, Canada. It was discovered in 1875 in the vicinity of the city of Victoria. Once thought to be extinct, it was rediscovered in 1957 on Trial Island, BC and is now known from several scattered localities in southern British Columbia. It is a winter annual growing in seasonally wet areas.

== Description ==
It is a small annual herb with divided leaves and inconspicuous white flowers.
