= L. alba =

L. alba may refer to:

- Limnanthes alba, the white meadowfoam, a flowering plant species native to California and Oregon
- Lippia alba, a flowering plant species native to southern Texas in the United States, Mexico, the Caribbean, Central America and South America

== See also ==
- Alba (disambiguation)
