= Nellie F. Flynn =

American botanist (1861-1922)

Nellie Francena Flynn (née Waite, 1861-1922) was an American botanist who collected plants primarily in Vermont and Massachusetts. She wrote The Flora of Burlington and Vicinity (1935).

Flynn was the inaugural vice-president of the Vermont Botanical Club, which she helped to establish. She contributed 21 articles to the botany journal Rhodora between 1903 and 1922.

In 1956, the Pringle Herbarium at the University of Vermont acquired the 22,700 specimens in her collection, called the N.F. Flynn Memorial Herbarium, which span several US states, Canada, Cuba, the Bahamas, England, France, Italy, Switzerland and Morocco. One of the plants she collected, false mermaid-weed, was not found in Vermont again until 2024.
