= Limnanthes montana =

Scientific classification
- Kingdom: Plantae
- Clade: Tracheophytes
- Clade: Angiosperms
- Clade: Eudicots
- Clade: Rosids
- Order: Brassicales
- Family: Limnanthaceae
- Genus: Limnanthes
- Section: Limnanthes sect. Inflexae
- Species: L. montana

Binomial name
- Limnanthes montana Jeps.

Species of flowering plant

Limnanthes montana is a species of meadowfoam known by the common name mountain meadowfoam. It is endemic to the Sierra Nevada foothills of California, where it grows in wet, grassy habitat such as marshy spring meadows.

== Description ==
This is an annual herb producing a spreading stem up to about 40 centimeters long. The leaves are made up of several linear to oval-shaped lobed or unlobed leaflets. The bell-shaped flower has white petals often veined with purple and tinted yellow at the bases.

The Latin specific epithet montana refers to mountains or coming from mountains.
