= Leptodeira pulchriceps =

Scientific classification
- Kingdom: Animalia
- Phylum: Chordata
- Class: Reptilia
- Order: Squamata
- Suborder: Serpentes
- Family: Colubridae
- Genus: Leptodeira
- Species: L. pulchriceps

Binomial name
- Leptodeira pulchriceps (Duellman, 1958)

Species of snake

Leptodeira pulchriceps is a species of snake in the family Colubridae. The species is native to Argentina, Bolivia, Brazil, and Paraguay.
