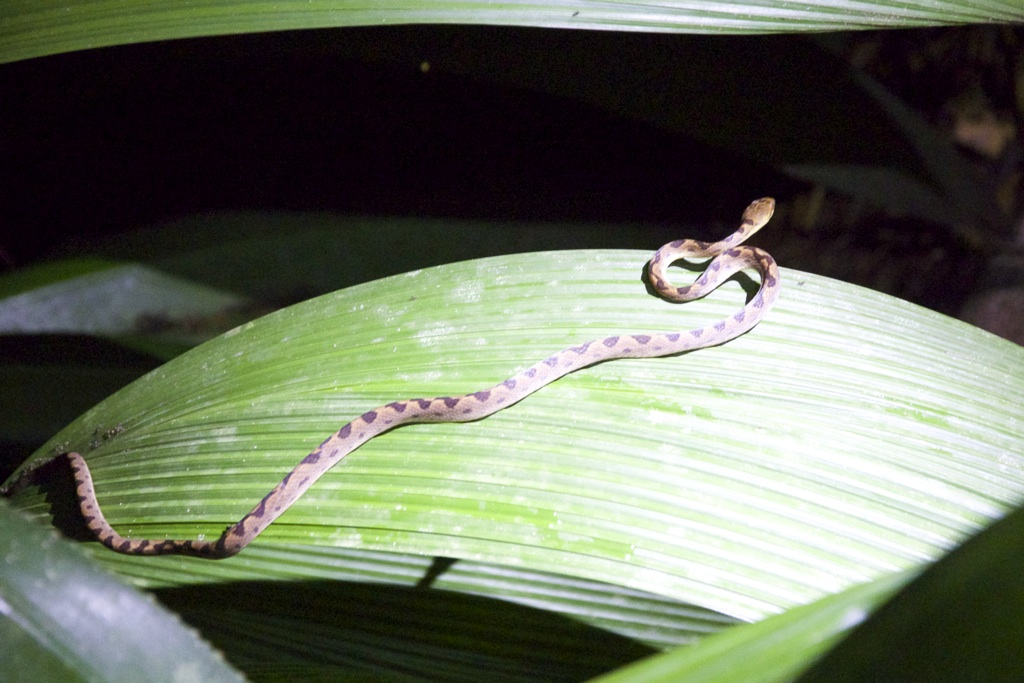
- A northern cat-eyed snake (Leptodeira septentrionalis), taken at Golfo Dulce Retreat, Golfo Dulce, Costa Rica

Conservation status
- Least Concern (IUCN 3.1)

Scientific classification
- Kingdom: Animalia
- Phylum: Chordata
- Class: Reptilia
- Order: Squamata
- Suborder: Serpentes
- Family: Colubridae
- Genus: Leptodeira
- Species: L. septentrionalis

Binomial name
- Leptodeira septentrionalis Kennicott, 1859

= Leptodeira septentrionalis =

Species of snake

Leptodeira septentrionalis, the northern cat-eyed snake, is a species of medium-sized, slightly venomous snake, found from southern Texas to Costa Rica.

== Appearance ==
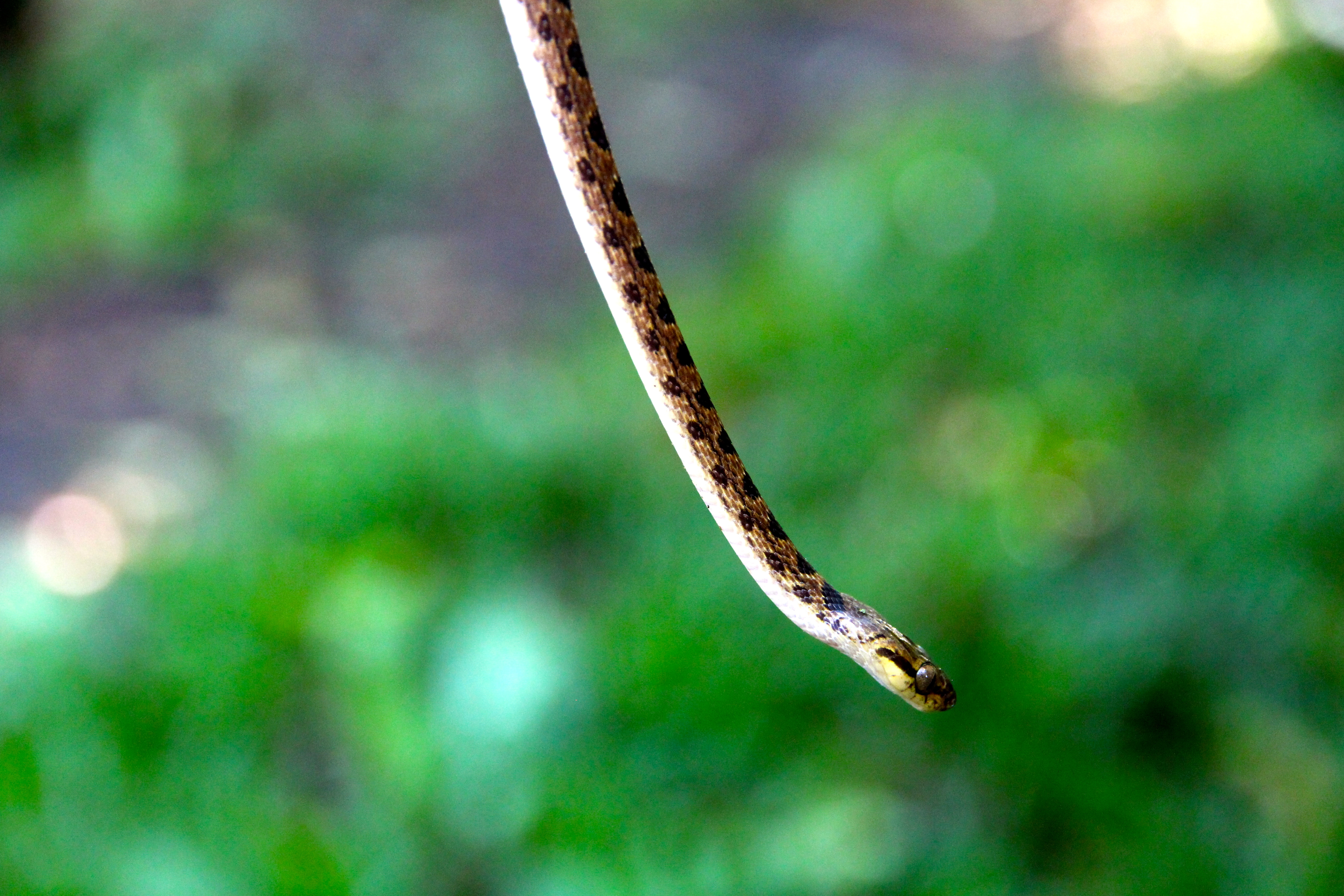
Head of a northern cat-eyed showing a dark brown line beside a bulging eye taken at Golfo Dulce Retreat, Golfo Dulce, Costa Rica

The northern cat eye is medium size (up to 1 m [3.3 ft]). In general females are slightly longer than males. They have smooth scales, with a dark brown line or spot beside the eye and dark brown blotches (which can fuse to form a zigzag) running down their backs. These spots may vary in pattern geographically. Its head is distinctly wider than its neck and it has large bulging eyes with reddish irises and light brown elliptical pupils.

== Behaviour ==
The northern cat eye is primarily arboreal and entirely nocturnal. At night, it hunts for frogs and their eggs and tadpoles; it is particularly known for feeding on those of the red-eyed tree frog. It swallows eggs, tadpoles, and small frogs alive but kills larger frogs with mild venom from its enlarged, grooved rear fangs. It will also consume lizards, toads, salamanders, small fish, and mice. When threatened it is able to flatten its head and spread its jaws although it rarely bites people.

== Reproduction and development ==
The Northern cat eye is oviparous and produces clutches of 6–13 eggs. As in other snake species delayed egg fertilisation can occur (fertile eggs can be laid up to several years after copulation). Developing snakes are nourished by a yolk sac for 79 to 90 days at which time they break through the outer shell using an egg tooth. The egg tooth is lost after hatching. Young northern cat-eyed snakes appear identical to adults but feature much fresher coloration. The snakes will continue to grow throughout their entire lives.

== Distribution ==
The northern cat eye is found in North America: US (S Texas), Mexico (Chiapas, Nuevo León, Quéretaro, Oaxaca, Puebla, Coahuila, Jalisco, Campeche, Yucatán, Quintana Roo, Nayarit), Guatemala, Honduras, Belize, El Salvador, Nicaragua, and Costa Rica. It is found at elevations of 0–1,940 m (0–6,365 ft) above sea level.

Within Costa Rica it is found on both Caribbean and Pacific coasts, including in Golfo Dulce, up to 1,200 m (3,900 ft) above sea level in a wide variety of habitats but most common at edges of ponds where amphibians breed.
