= Leptodeira ornata =

Scientific classification
- Kingdom: Animalia
- Phylum: Chordata
- Class: Reptilia
- Order: Squamata
- Suborder: Serpentes
- Family: Colubridae
- Genus: Leptodeira
- Species: L. ornata

Binomial name
- Leptodeira ornata (Bocourt, 1884)

Species of snake

Leptodeira ornata, the northern cat-eyed snake or ornate cat-eyed snake, is a species of snake in the family Colubridae. The species is native to Panama, Colombia, and Ecuador.
