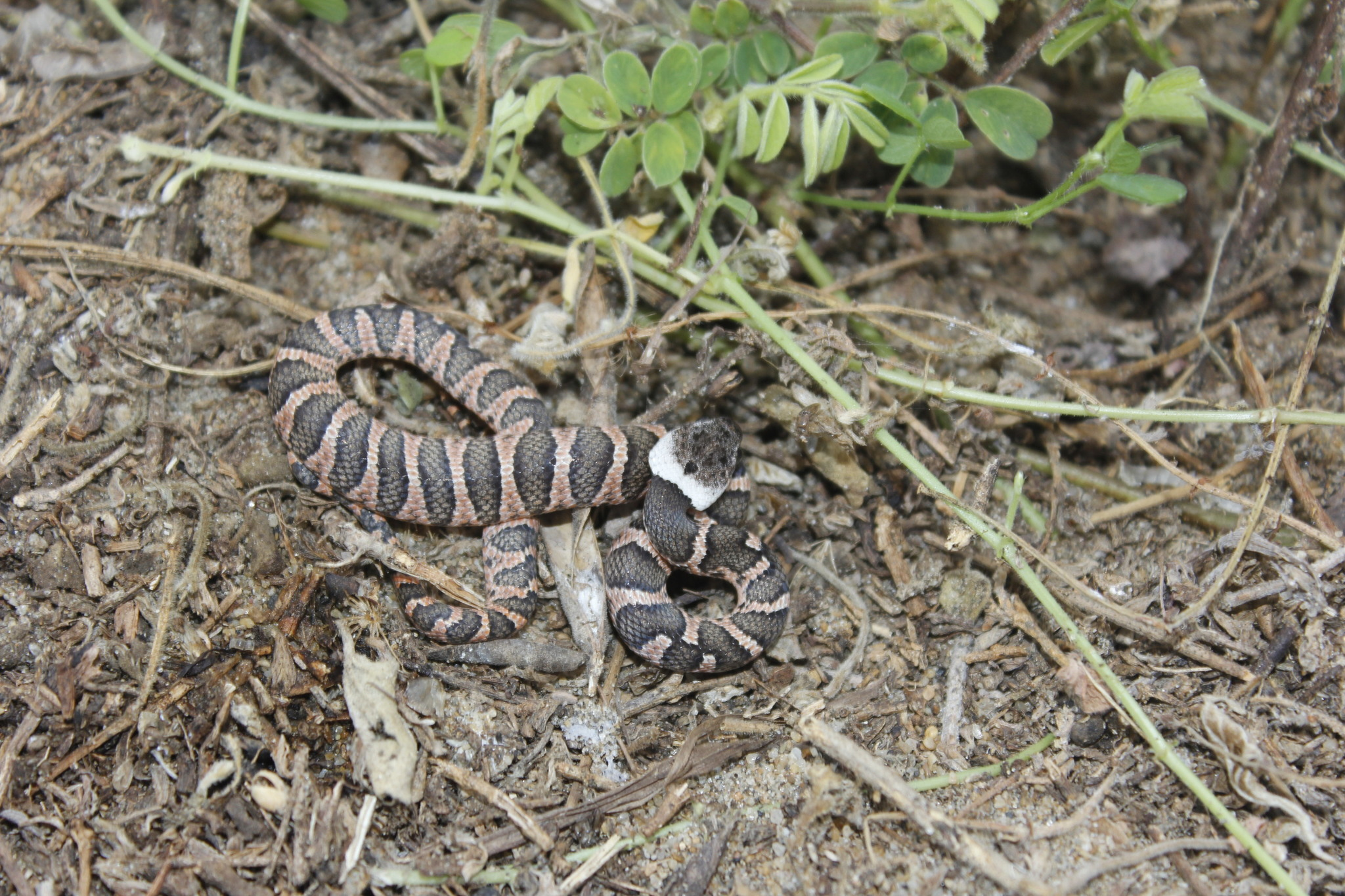

Conservation status
- Least Concern (IUCN 3.1)

Scientific classification
- Kingdom: Animalia
- Phylum: Chordata
- Class: Reptilia
- Order: Squamata
- Suborder: Serpentes
- Family: Colubridae
- Genus: Leptodeira
- Species: L. frenata

Binomial name
- Leptodeira frenata (Cope, 1886)

Synonyms
- Sibon frenatum Cope, 1886

= Leptodeira frenata =

Species of snake

Leptodeira frenata, also known commonly as the Mayan cat-eyed snake and the rainforest cat-eyed snake, is a species of mildly venomous snake in the subfamily Dipsadinae of the family Colubridae. The species is native to Mexico, Guatemala, and Belize, and there are three recognized subspecies.

== Geographic range ==
Leptodeira frenata is found on the Atlantic slope from neotropical Mexico southward through Belize to northern Guatemala.

== Habitat ==
The preferred natural habitat of Leptodeira frenata is forest, at altitudes of 150–450 m (490–1,480 ft).

== Behavior ==
Leptodeira frenata is terrestrial and partly arboreal.

== Venom ==
Leptodeira frenata is venomous. Bites to humans may cause intense pain, swelling, and bloody blisters.

== Subspecies ==
The following three subspecies are recognized as being valid, including the nominotypical subspecies.

- Leptodeira frenata frenata (Cope, 1886)
- Leptodeira frenata malleisi Dunn & Stuart, 1935
- Leptodeira frenata yucatanensis (Cope, 1887)

Nota bene: A trinomial authority in parentheses indicates that the subspecies was originally described in a genus other than Leptodeira.

== Etymology ==
The subspecific name, malleisi, is in honor of ornithologist Harry Malleis (died 1931).
