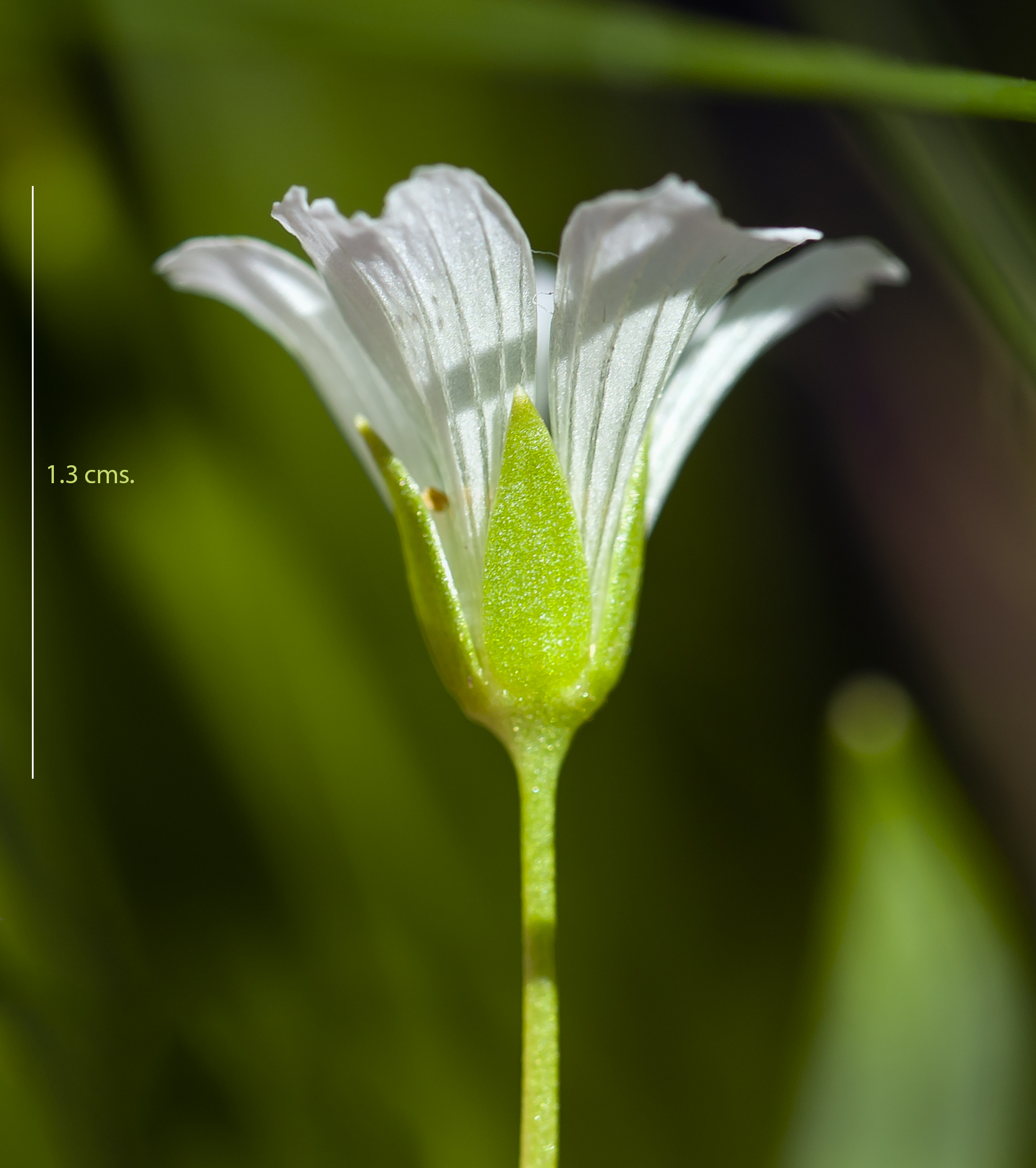

Conservation status
- Critically Imperiled (NatureServe)

Scientific classification
- Kingdom: Plantae
- Clade: Tracheophytes
- Clade: Angiosperms
- Clade: Eudicots
- Clade: Rosids
- Order: Brassicales
- Family: Limnanthaceae
- Genus: Limnanthes
- Section: Limnanthes sect. Limnanthes
- Species: L. bakeri

Binomial name
- Limnanthes bakeri J.T.Howell

= Limnanthes bakeri =

Species of flowering plant

Limnanthes bakeri is a rare species of meadowfoam known by the common name Baker's meadowfoam. It is endemic to Mendocino County, California, where it is known from only about 20 occurrences in the vicinity of Willits. It is a plant of wet, grassy habitat such as vernal pools and marshy spring meadows.

== Description ==
This is an annual herb producing a spreading stem up to about 40 centimeters long. The leaves are made up of several oval-shaped leaflets each about a centimeter long. The bell-shaped flower has veiny white or pale yellow petals with white tips.
