= Leptodeira ashmeadii =

Scientific classification
- Kingdom: Animalia
- Phylum: Chordata
- Class: Reptilia
- Order: Squamata
- Suborder: Serpentes
- Family: Colubridae
- Genus: Leptodeira
- Species: L. ashmeadii

Binomial name
- Leptodeira ashmeadii (Hallowell, 1845)

Species of snake

Leptodeira ashmeadii, the banded cat-eyed snake, is a species of snake in the subfamily Dipsadinae of the family Colubridae. The species is native to Colombia, Venezuela, Trinidad and Tobago, and Brazil.
