= Leptodeira misinawui =

Scientific classification
- Kingdom: Animalia
- Phylum: Chordata
- Class: Reptilia
- Order: Squamata
- Suborder: Serpentes
- Family: Colubridae
- Genus: Leptodeira
- Species: L. misinawui

Binomial name
- Leptodeira misinawui Torres-Carvajal, Sánchez-Nivicela, Posse, Celi & Koch, 2020

Species of snake

Leptodeira misinawui is a species of snake in the family Colubridae. The species is native to Ecuador.
