= Leptodeira rubricata =

Conservation status
- Least Concern (IUCN 3.1)

Scientific classification
- Kingdom: Animalia
- Phylum: Chordata
- Class: Reptilia
- Order: Squamata
- Suborder: Serpentes
- Family: Colubridae
- Genus: Leptodeira
- Species: L. rubricata

Binomial name
- Leptodeira rubricata (Cope, 1893)

Species of snake

Leptodeira rubricata is a species of snake in the family Colubridae. The species is native to Costa Rica and Panama.
