= Leptodeira larcorum =

Scientific classification
- Kingdom: Animalia
- Phylum: Chordata
- Class: Reptilia
- Order: Squamata
- Suborder: Serpentes
- Family: Colubridae
- Genus: Leptodeira
- Species: L. larcorum

Binomial name
- Leptodeira larcorum Schmidt & Walker, 1943

Species of snake

Leptodeira larcorum is a species of snake in the family Colubridae. The species is native to Peru, Venezuela, Trinidad and Tobago, and Brazil.
