= Leptodeira splendida =

Conservation status
- Least Concern (IUCN 3.1)

Scientific classification
- Kingdom: Animalia
- Phylum: Chordata
- Class: Reptilia
- Order: Squamata
- Suborder: Serpentes
- Family: Colubridae
- Genus: Leptodeira
- Species: L. splendida

Binomial name
- Leptodeira splendida Günther, 1885

Species of snake

Leptodeira splendida, the splendid cat-eyed snake, is a species of snake in the family Colubridae. The species is native to Mexico.
