= Leptodeira approximans =

Scientific classification
- Kingdom: Animalia
- Phylum: Chordata
- Class: Reptilia
- Order: Squamata
- Suborder: Serpentes
- Family: Colubridae
- Genus: Leptodeira
- Species: L. approximans

Binomial name
- Leptodeira approximans (Günther, 1872)

Species of snake

Leptodeira approximans is a species of snake in the family Colubridae. The species is native to Ecuador, Peru, and Colombia.
