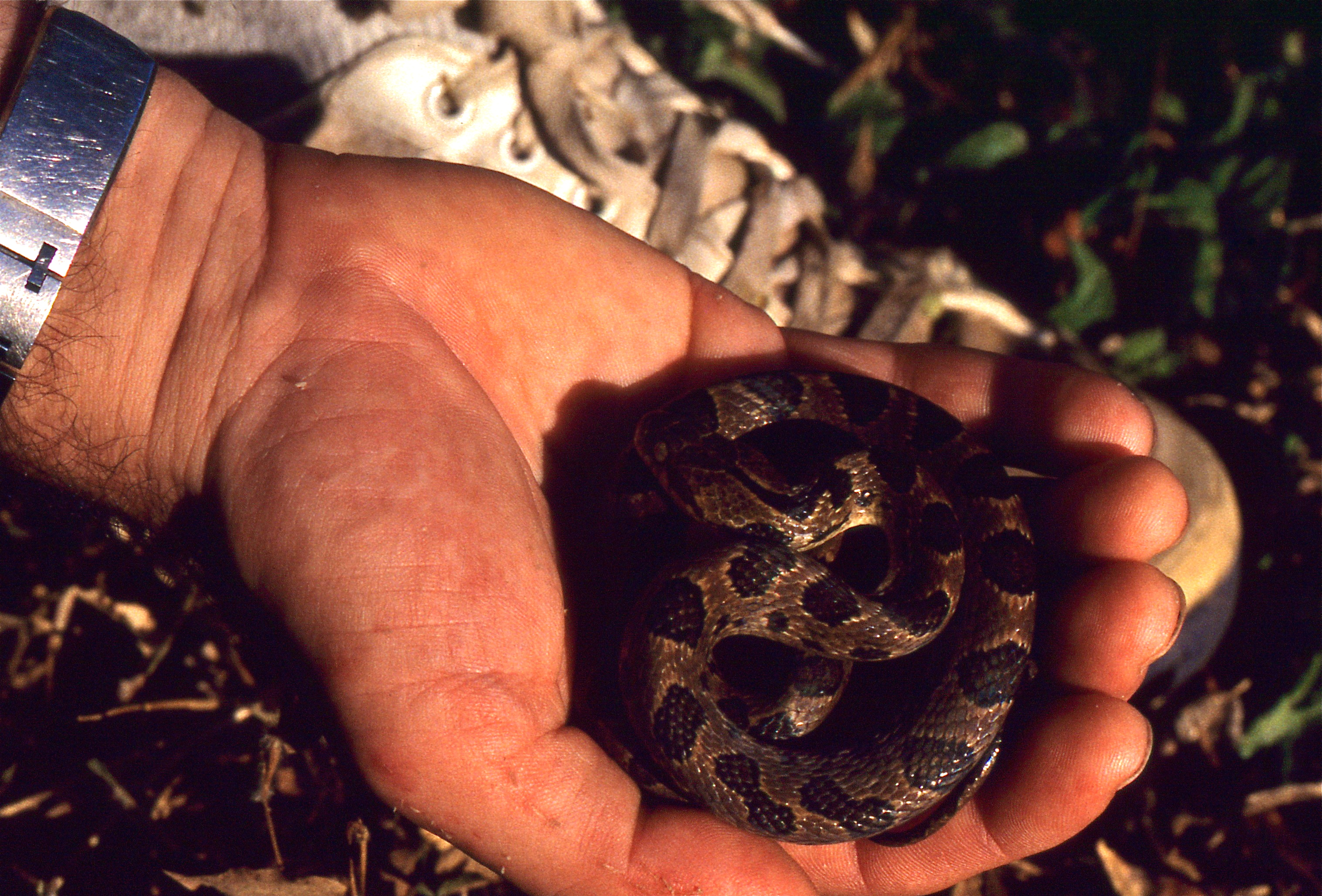

Conservation status
- Least Concern (IUCN 3.1)

Scientific classification
- Kingdom: Animalia
- Phylum: Chordata
- Class: Reptilia
- Order: Squamata
- Suborder: Serpentes
- Family: Colubridae
- Genus: Leptodeira
- Species: L. rhombifera

Binomial name
- Leptodeira rhombifera Günther, 1872

= Leptodeira rhombifera =

Species of snake

Leptodeira rhombifera is a species of snake in the family Colubridae. The species is native to Panama, Guatemala, Honduras, El Salvador, Nicaragua, and Costa Rica.
