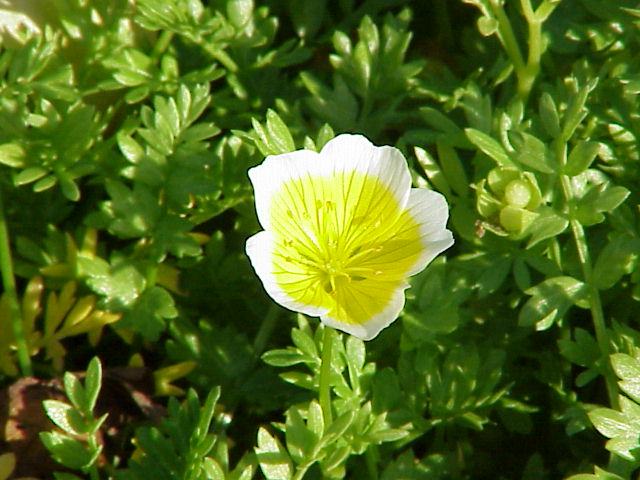

Scientific classification
- Kingdom: Plantae
- Clade: Tracheophytes
- Clade: Angiosperms
- Clade: Eudicots
- Clade: Rosids
- Order: Brassicales
- Family: Limnanthaceae
- Genus: Limnanthes
- Section: Limnanthes sect. Limnanthes
- Species: L. douglasii

Binomial name
- Limnanthes douglasii R. Br.

= Limnanthes douglasii =

Species of flowering plant

Limnanthes douglasii is a species of annual flowering plant in the family Limnanthaceae (meadowfoam) commonly known as Douglas' meadowfoam or poached egg plant. It is native to California and Oregon, where it grows in wet, grassy habitat, such as vernal pools and spring meadows. It can grow in poorly drained clay soils. The plant was collected by the Scottish explorer and botanist David Douglas, who worked on the west coast of America in the 1820s.

The plant usually bears white flowers with yellow centers, hence the name "poached egg plant", but flower color can vary across subspecies. It is a popular ornamental plant. It attracts hoverflies and is pollinated by bees. It is self-seeding, even in a lawn.

This plant has gained the Royal Horticultural Society's Award of Garden Merit.

There are six subspecies:

- L. douglasii subsp. douglasii R. Br., is native to the coastal mountains and valleys of southwestern Oregon south to the San Francisco Bay Area
- L. douglasii subsp. nivea (C.T. Mason) C.T. Mason, with mostly white flowers, grows in the coastal mountains of northern California
- L. douglasii subsp. ornduffii (E. G. Buxton), with 4 petals instead of 5, is endemic to California's San Mateo County
- L. douglasii subsp. rosea (Benth.) C.T. Mason, found in California's Central Valley and adjacent hills, often has pink veining on its petals
- L. douglasii subsp. sulphurea (C.T. Mason) C.T. Mason, is a rare yellow-petaled subspecies endemic to the Bay Area
- L. douglasii subsp. striata (Jeps.) Morin, has recently been subsumed into this species; it occurs in the Klamath range and the north and central Sierra Nevada

The exact amount of subspecies had been disputed, with some arguing that there are four subspecies of Limnanthes douglasii, though existing species are highly polymorphic.

== Species interactions ==
Andrena pulverea (syn. limnanthii) is a species of mining bee that specializes in pollinating the flowers of L. douglasii subsp. rosea.

== Gallery ==
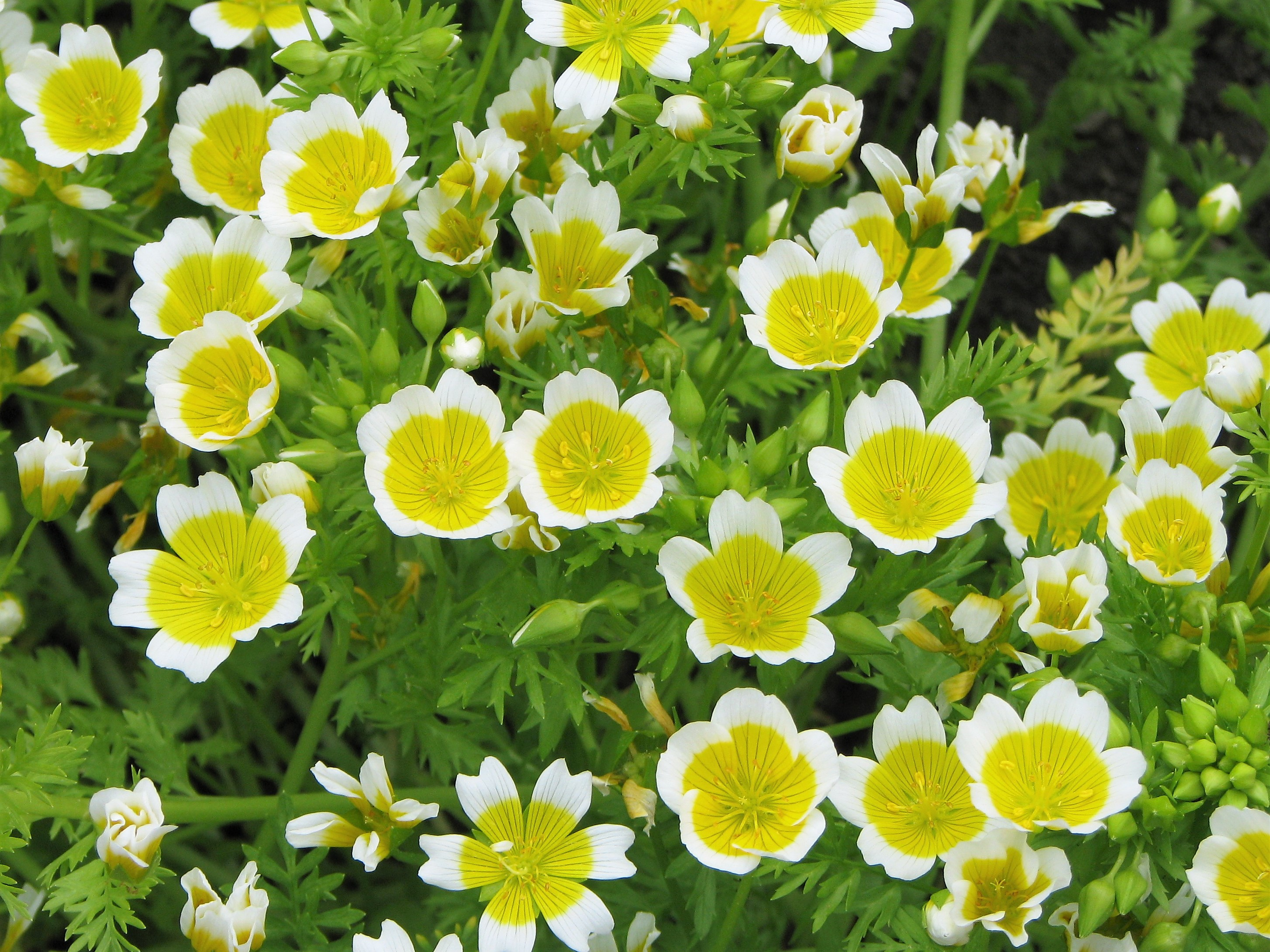

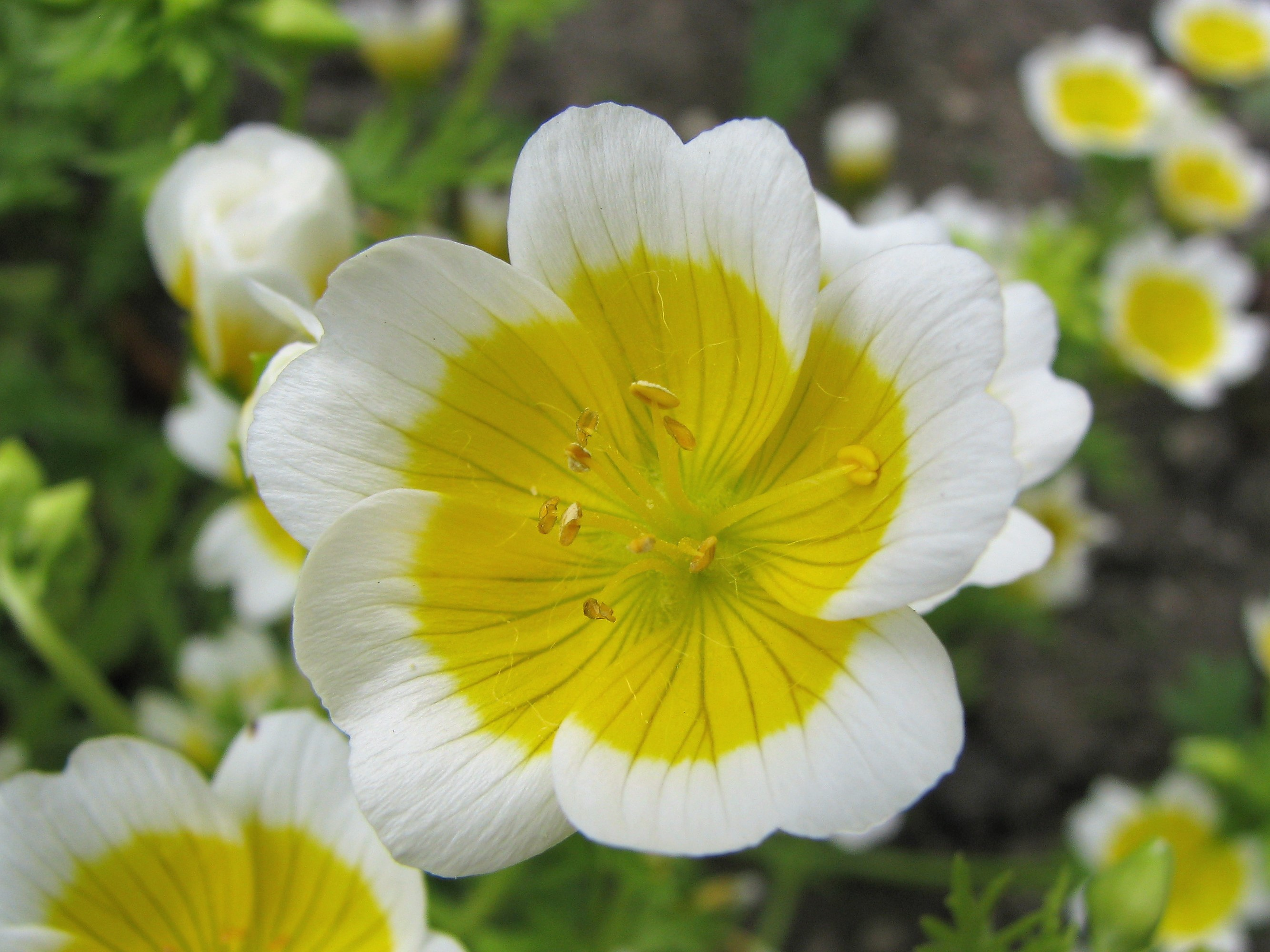

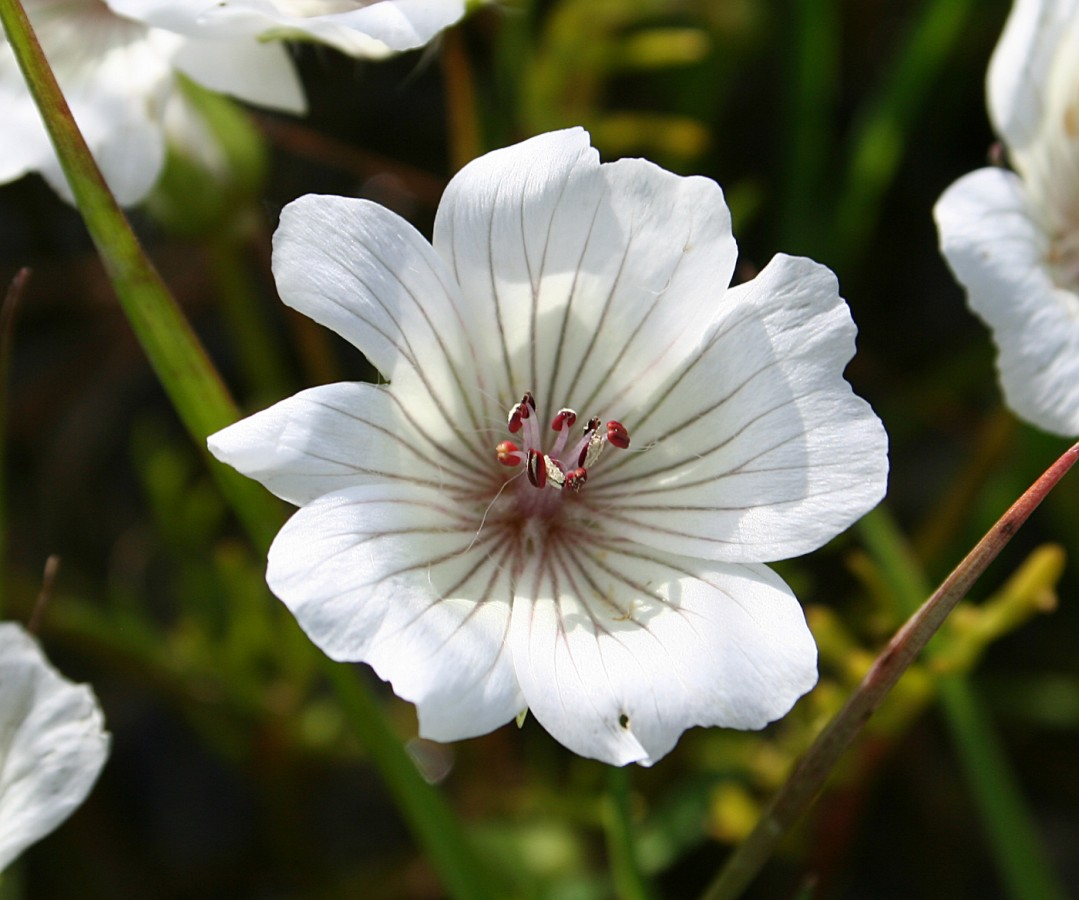
