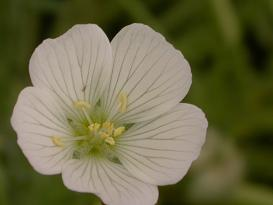

Scientific classification
- Kingdom: Plantae
- Clade: Embryophytes
- Clade: Tracheophytes
- Clade: Spermatophytes
- Clade: Angiosperms
- Clade: Eudicots
- Clade: Rosids
- Order: Brassicales
- Family: Limnanthaceae
- Genus: Limnanthes
- Section: Limnanthes sect. Inflexae
- Species: L. alba

Binomial name
- Limnanthes alba Benth.

= Limnanthes alba =

Species of flowering plant

Limnanthes alba is a species of flowering plant in the meadowfoam family known by the common name white meadowfoam. It is native to California and Oregon, where it grows in wet grassy habitat, such as vernal pools and moist spots in woodlands. It generally grows in poorly drained soils. It is an annual herb producing an erect or decumbent stem up to about 30 centimeters long. The leaves divided into several lobed or unlobed leaflets. The flower is cup-shaped with white petals 1 to 1.5 centimeters long.

This grassland wildflower is also under small-scale cultivation. It is the source of meadowfoam seed oil. The oil is one of the most stable vegetable oils known and can be converted to waxes and lubricants, similar to whale oil. White meadowfoam is very susceptible to the Botrytis cinerea fungus; commercial crops were devastated during the 1982 and 1984 growing seasons.

Honey produced by bees that pollinate Limnanthes alba has the distinct flavor of toasted marshmallows.

== Meadowfoam seed oil ==
White meadowfoam is the source of meadowfoam seed oil, a type of vegetable oil which is extracted from the seeds of the plant. These seeds contain 20-30% oil. Meadowfoam seed oil is extraordinarily stable, primarily because it contains over 98% long chain fatty acids. Meadowfoam oil is most similar to rapeseed oil, with which it competes directly for the high-volume industrial oilseed applications. Meadowfoam oil is widely used in cosmetic and hair-care applications due to its stability, emolliency and smooth, soft skin feel. The oil in its unpurified form is not suitable for human consumption, primarily because of the high erucic acid content.

Average fatty acid content of meadowfoam seed oil
Name	Composition range
Eicos-5-enoic acid	58–64%
Docos-5-enoic acid	3–6%
Erucic acid	10–14%
Docosa-5,13-dienoic acid	15–21%
