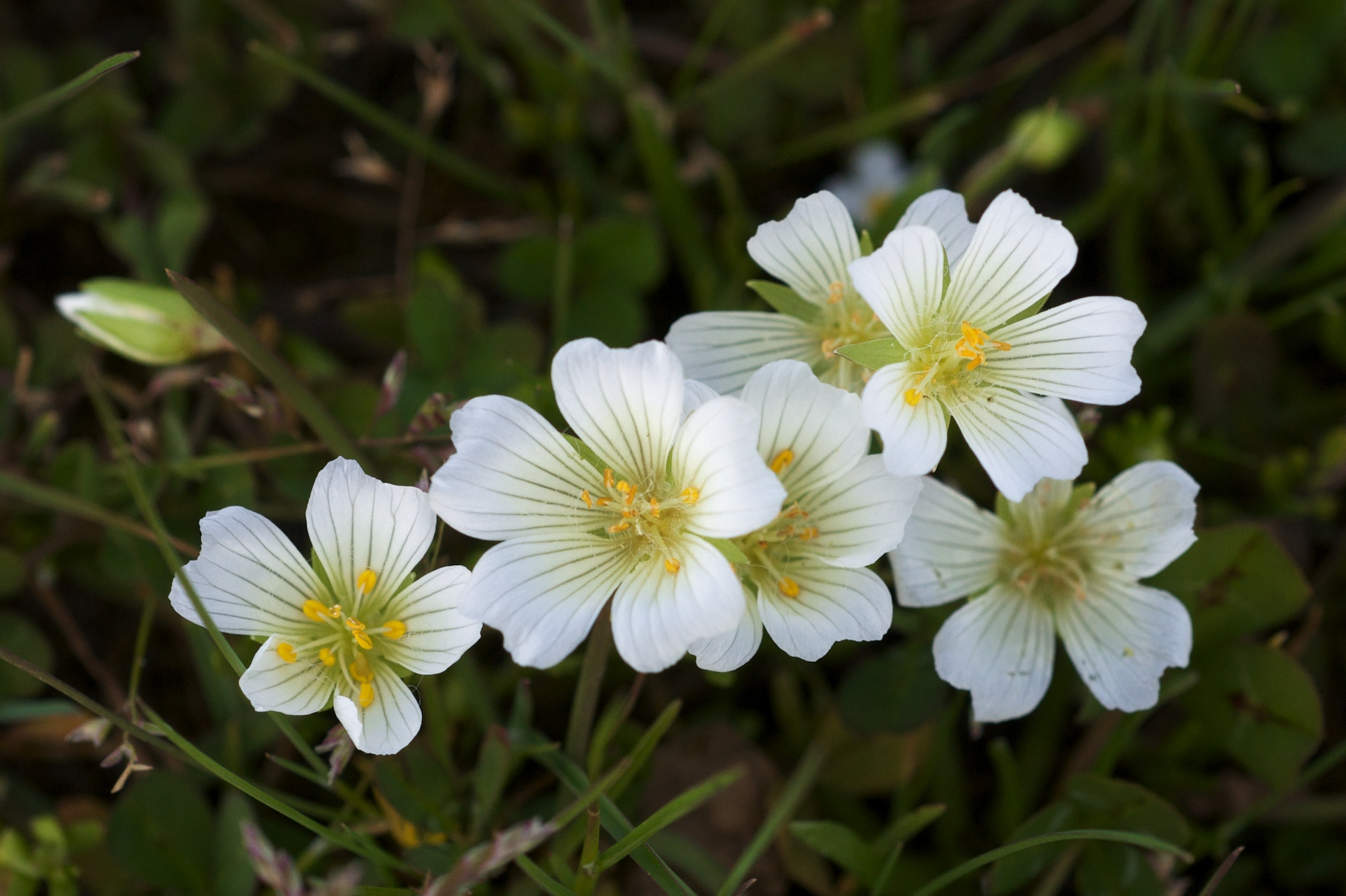
- ssp. californica

Scientific classification
- Kingdom: Plantae
- Clade: Tracheophytes
- Clade: Angiosperms
- Clade: Eudicots
- Clade: Rosids
- Order: Brassicales
- Family: Limnanthaceae
- Genus: Limnanthes
- Section: Limnanthes sect. Inflexae
- Species: L. floccosa

Binomial name
- Limnanthes floccosa Howell

Subspecies
- L. floccosa subsp. bellingeriana L. floccosa subsp. californica L. floccosa subsp. floccosa L. floccosa subsp. grandiflora L. floccosa subsp. pumilla

= Limnanthes floccosa =

Species of flowering plant

Limnanthes floccosa, or woolly meadowfoam, is a species of meadowfoam found in Northern California and Southern Oregon, in the United States. Most of the subspecies have highly restricted distributions and are listed as critical or endangered.

Perhaps the most familiar subspecies of woolly meadowfoam is californica, not because it is the one most often seen (it is very inconspicuous), but because this taxon has been the focus of a significant conflict. The subspecies is found only among a dozen or so populations in Butte County, California, and is legally protected as endangered. Conflict has arisen between those who would protect the few remaining populations and those who would rather use its critical habitat for economic activities.

Certain subspecies of L. floccosa have been used to improve a meadowfoam cultivar derived from Limnanthes alba. The crop is grown for its seed oil, which contains long chain fatty acids (greater than 20 carbons), has high oxidative stability, does not have any odor and is highly emollient. The oil is currently used in cosmetics manufacturing. Limnanthes is cultivated in the Willamette Valley of Oregon and elsewhere.

== Taxonomy ==
Woolly meadowfoam Limnanthes floccosa is a member of the genus section inflexae (wherein the petals curve over the fruit when it is mature). Most populations of this species are at least partially autogamous (self-pollinating).

The species is easily distinguished from other members of inflexae by the fact that its petals are not much longer and often shorter than the sepals. The flowers mostly remain closed even at maturity, in contrast to Table Mountain meadowfoam (Limnanthes douglasii ssp. nivea), for example.

The most widespread subspecies (floccosa) occurs in both California and Oregon.

Two subspecies (pumila and grandiflora) are endemic to southern Oregon.

The Jepson Manual (a flora of California) recognizes only one California endemic subspecies (californica) but the Flora of North America recognizes a second (bellingeriana). (The Jepson Manual notes a putative subspecies (bellingeriana) has been "reported from Cascade Range Foothills but requires further study".)

=== Woolly meadowfoam ===
L. f. subsp. floccosa is found throughout northern California and southern Oregon. Its range overlaps the highly restricted ranges of all the other subspecies. Thus at most locations where a rare subspecies occurs it is also possible to find this subspecies, making accurate identification critical.

Although widespread, the taxon is not common anywhere.

It differs from the two endemic Oregon subspecies pumila and grandiflora and the northern California bellingeriana in that it has densely hairy sepals and herbage. (Subspecies pumila, grandiflora and bellingeriana all have hairless or only sparsely hairy herbage and have sepals that are either hairless or hairy on only one side.)

Woolly meadowfoam can be distinguished from the endangered Butte County meadowfoam by the shape of the flower and the fact that woolly meadowfoam lacks hairs along the base of the petal margins. Technical features of the nutlet are also useful.

=== Bellinger's meadowfoam ===
L. f. subsp.bellingeriana (M. Peck) C. T. Mason was named for Dr. Grover C. and Mrs. Hattie Bellinger who first collected a sample of the herbaceous plant in 1936. It can be found in the foothills of northern California. Bellinger's meadowfoam can be distinguished from other woolly meadowfoam subspecies by the bell or urn shaped flowers, hairless (or only sparsely hairy) sepals, and petals without hairs on the margins of the base. The leaves and stems are hairless.

=== Big-flowered woolly meadowfoam ===
Limnanthes floccosa subsp. grandiflora Arroyo is only known from vernal pools in the Agate Desert, an area near White City, Oregon. These plants, unlike subspecies floccosa, have leaves and stems that are only sparsely hairy, not woolly. This meadowfoam can further be distinguished from other woolly meadowfoam subspecies by the cup shaped flowers with sepals that have very little hair on their outer (bottom) surface but are densely hairy on the inside (top) surface. The petals have hairs along the margins of the base.

=== Dwarf woolly meadowfoam ===
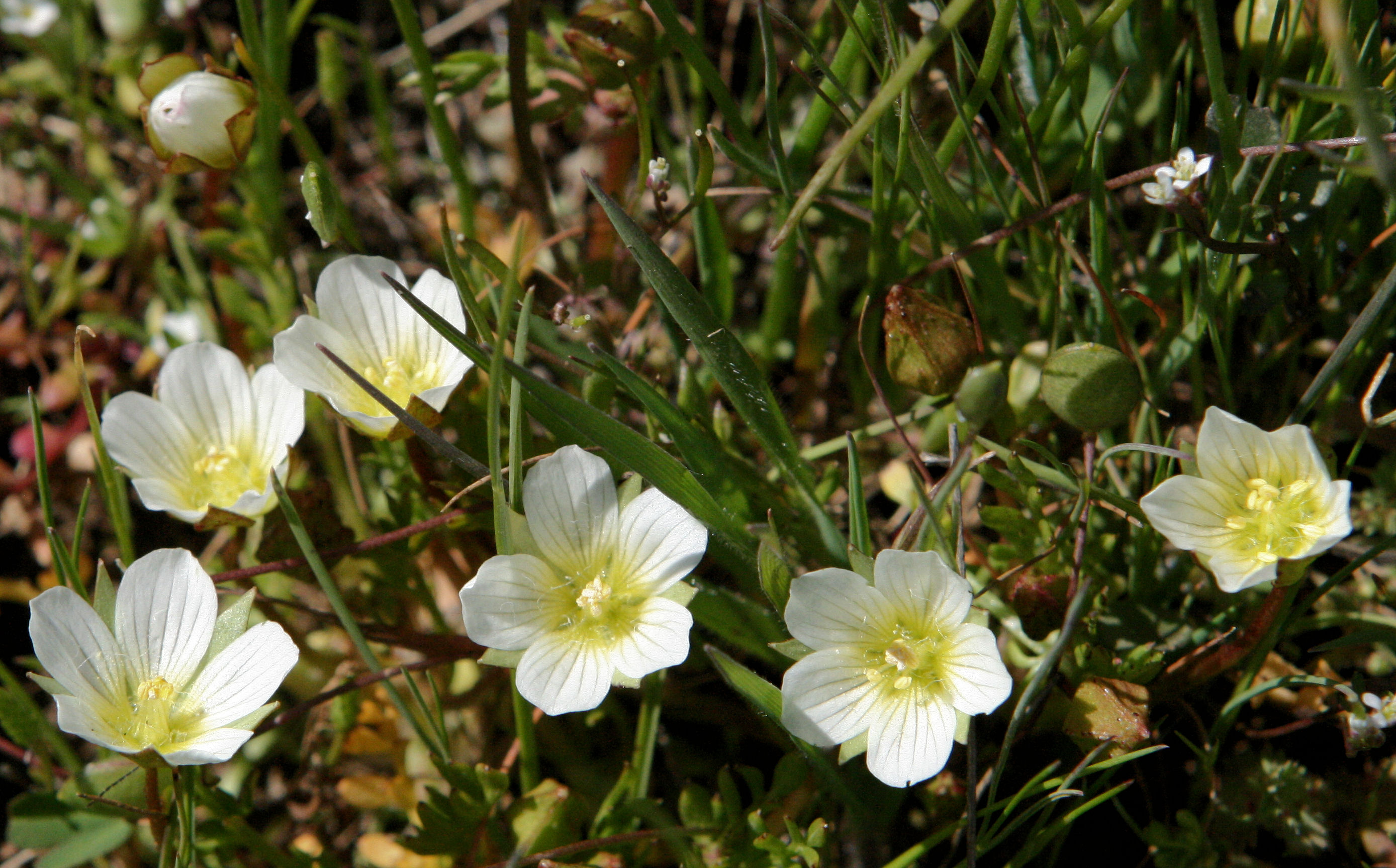
Dwarf Woolly Meadowfoam.

Unlike other subspecies of Limnanthes floccosa, the subspecies pumila (Howell) Arroyo inhabits the edges of vernal pools and wetter areas on Upper and Lower Table Rock, lava formations in the Rogue Valley, Jackson County, Oregon. The 3.9-inch (9.9 cm) tall plants are distinguished by their cup shaped flowers with sepals that are hairless on the both surfaces and petals that have hairs along the margins at the base. Like Bellinger's meadowfoam, the leaves and stems are hairless.

=== Butte County or Shippee meadowfoam ===
Limnanthes floccosa subsp. californica Arroyo is an endangered plant endemic to Butte County, California. Development of land in the Chico, California area, including highway improvements and construction of a school and a church, has been impacted by the federal and state protected status of the plant. Local celebrity Anthony Watts became involved in the conflict by suggesting that the endangered meadowfoam could be "farmed out of danger".

It is possible that this plant could provide genetic resources for the ongoing development of meadowfoam as a crop. The plant's critical habitat is steadily declining due to development.

Butte County meadowfoam can be distinguished from other woolly meadowfoam subspecies by the cup shaped flowers with sepals that are densely hairy and petals with hairs along the margin at the base. The leaves and stems are densely hairy.

Comparison of characteristics of woolly meadowfoam subspecies.
	floccosa	californica	bellingeriana	grandiflora	pumila
Herbage	Woolly	Woolly	Hairless	Hairless	Hairless (or only sparsely hairy)
Flower Shape	Bell or Urn	Cup	Bell or Urn	Cup	Cup
Sepals	Woolly	Woolly	Hairless (or only sparsely hairy)	Hairless	Woolly on inner (top) surface only
Petal Base Margins	Hairless	With hairs	Hairless	With hairs	With hairs
