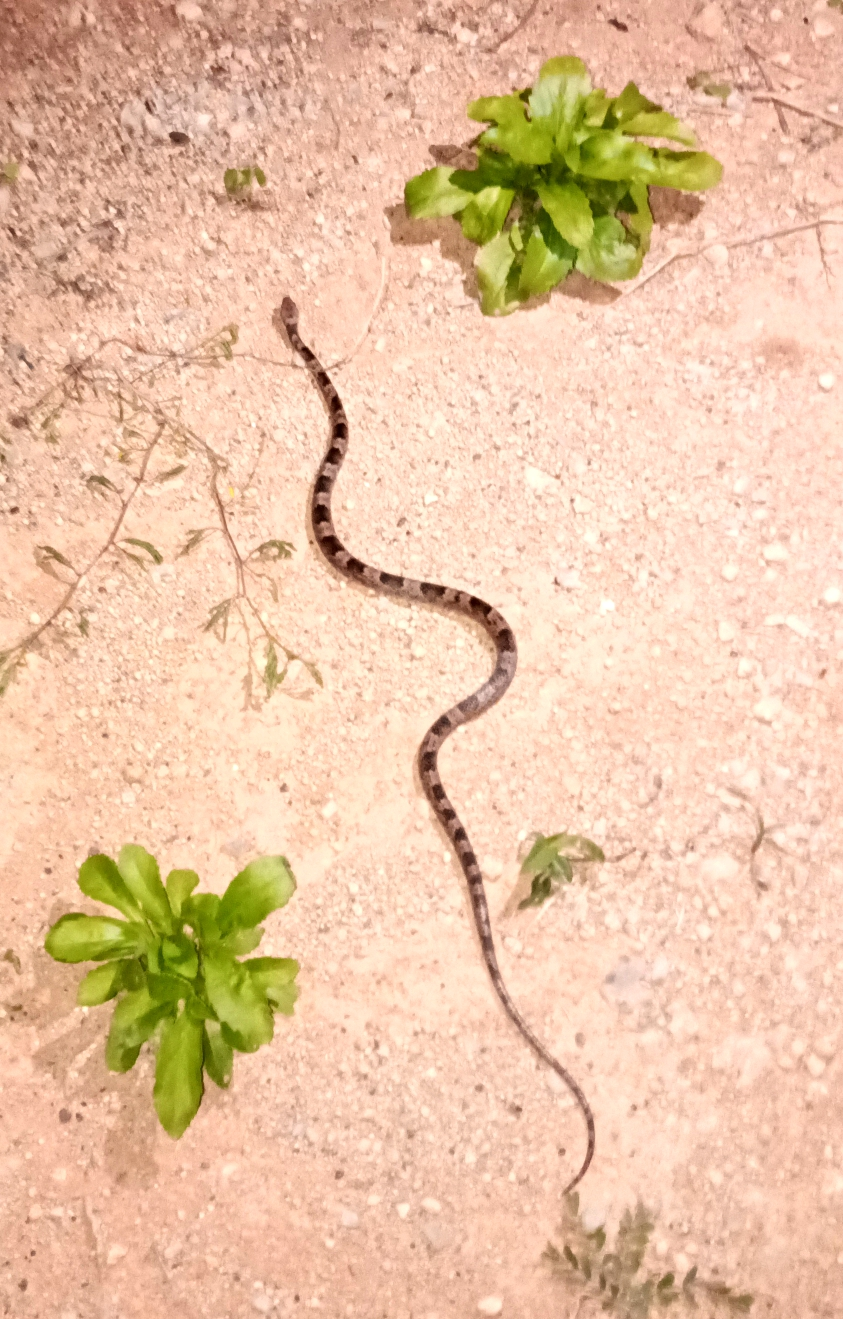

Conservation status
- Vulnerable (IUCN 3.1)

Scientific classification
- Kingdom: Animalia
- Phylum: Chordata
- Class: Reptilia
- Order: Squamata
- Suborder: Serpentes
- Family: Colubridae
- Genus: Leptodeira
- Species: L. bakeri

Binomial name
- Leptodeira bakeri Ruthven, 1936

= Leptodeira bakeri =

Species of snake

Leptodeira bakeri, also known commonly as the Aruban cat-eyed snake and Baker's cat-eyed snake, is a species of rear-fanged snake in the subfamily Dipsadinae of the family Colubridae. The species is found in Aruba and Venezuela.

== Etymology and taxonomy ==
The specific name, bakeri, is in honor of American zoologist Horace Burrington Baker, who collected the holotype on 6 August 1922, with the type locality being Bubali, Aruba. In 1923, after Baker had brought back with him the series of specimens that contained the eventual holotype to Museum of Zoology at the University of Michigan, herpetologist Alexander G. Ruthven examined and recorded it as a member of Leptodeira annulata. It would not be until later, after he investigated the eventual holotype and other snake specimens from its region, that Ruthven concluded that it constituted a separate species, the original description of which he published in 1936.

== Description ==
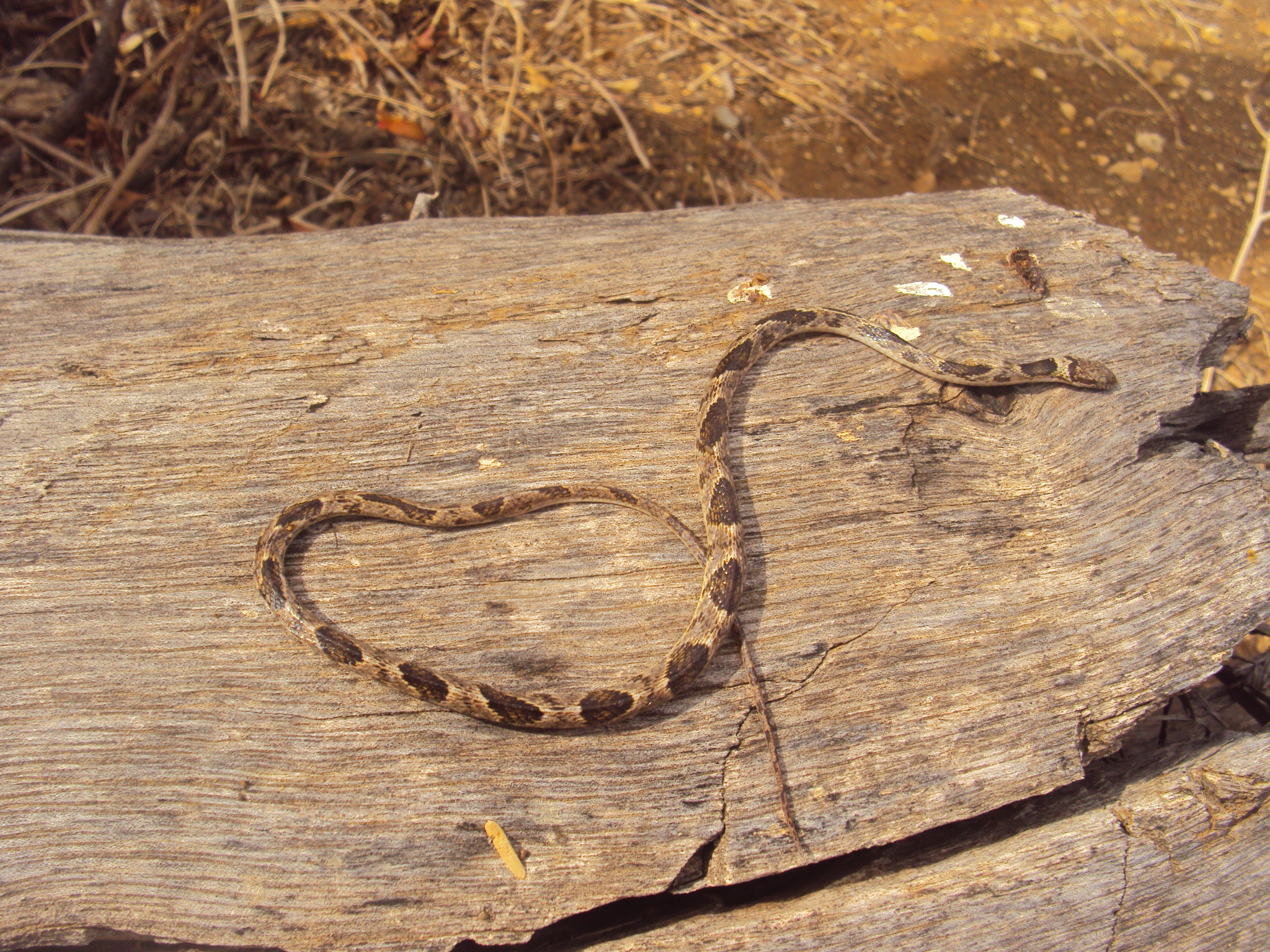
Leptodeira bakeri.

The dorsal scales of Leptodeira bakeri are arranged in 19 rows on the neck, 17 rows at midbody, and 15 rows near the cloaca. The ventral scales number 170–175.

== Behavior ==
Leptodeira bakeri is terrestrial and partly arboreal.

== Diet ==
Leptodeira bakeri preys upon frogs.

== Geographic distribution ==
Leptodeira bakeri can be found on the Dutch Caribbean island of Aruba, the Paraguaná Peninsula of Falcón, Venezuela, and in Zulia, Venezuela, in an area to the southwest of the state capital Maracaibo. In total, its geographic range spans an area of about 11,000 km^{2} (4,200 sq mi).

== Habitat ==
The natural habitats of Leptodeira bakeri are forest and shrubland, at altitudes from sea level to 150 m (490 ft), but it is also known to inhabit habitats that have been degraded by human activity, such as gardens and pastures.
