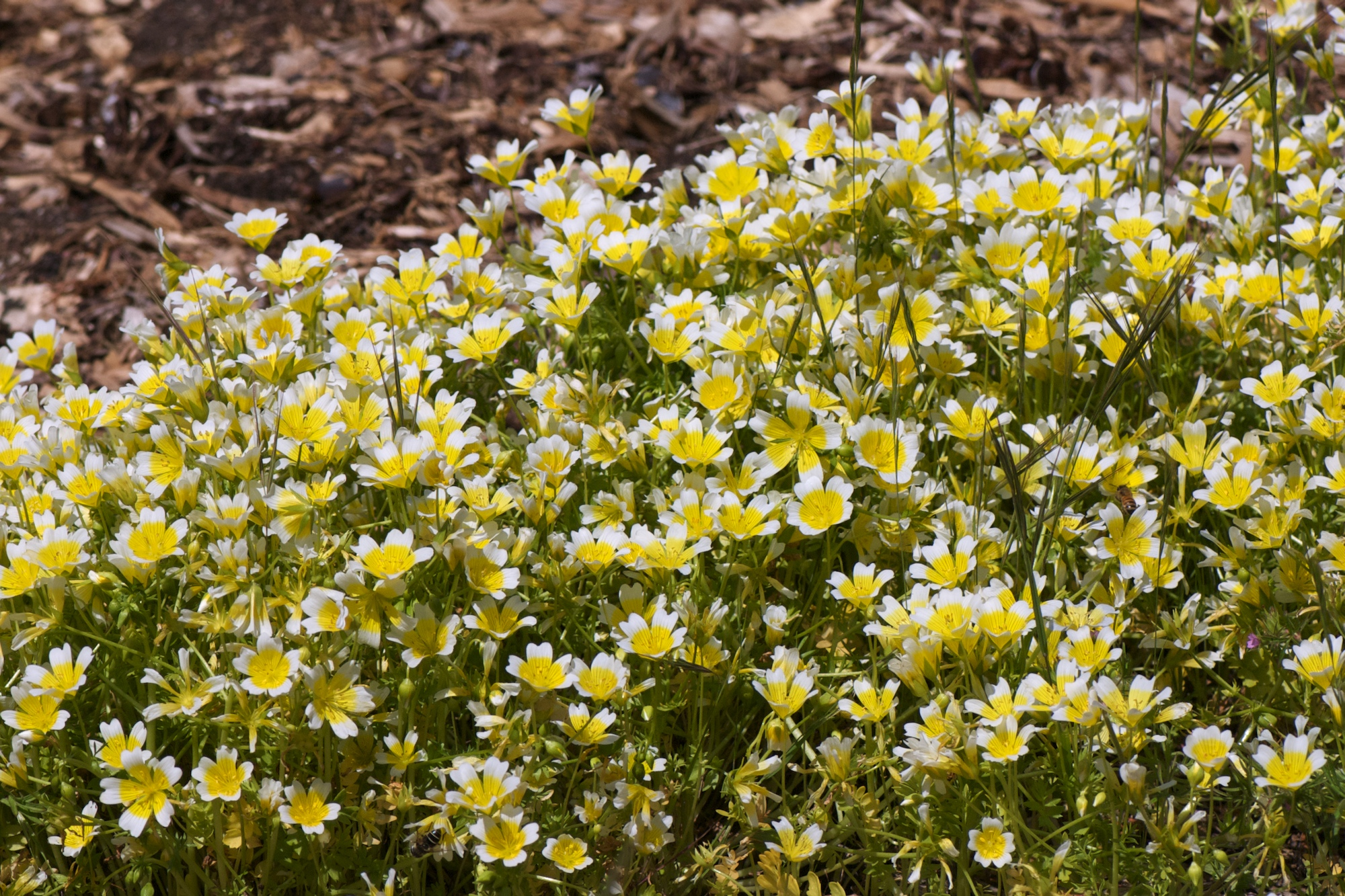
- Limnanthes douglasii

Scientific classification
- Kingdom: Plantae
- Clade: Tracheophytes
- Clade: Angiosperms
- Clade: Eudicots
- Clade: Rosids
- Order: Brassicales
- Family: Limnanthaceae
- Genus: Limnanthes; R.Br.

Species
- 7; see text

= Limnanthes =

Genus of flowering plants

Limnanthes, the type genus of the family Limnanthaceae, consists of annual herbaceous plants commonly known as the meadowfoams. The seven species are all native to coastal and adjoining regions (inland valleys, foothills and mountains) of western North America, where they typically grow in marshy habitats, such as the margins of vernal pools. Some are endemic to California.

General form ranges from decumbent to erect, with leaves either pinnately lobed or compound; the lobes or leaflets may themselves range from entire to deeply lobed. Both 4- and 5-sepaled and petaled members are known.

The white meadowfoam Limnanthes alba is of commercial interest for its oil, while several other species are rare or endangered. Honey produced by bees that pollinate Limnanthes alba has the distinct flavor of toasted marshmallows.

L. douglasii is widely cultivated as a hardy annual, its white and yellow flower colour giving it the common name of poached egg plant.

== Species ==
The genus is divided into two sections, Limnanthes, in which the sepals reflex (curve back) during fruit maturation, and Inflexae, in which the sepals curve over the maturing fruit.

Section Limnanthes:

Limnanthes bakeri
Limnanthes douglasii
Limnanthes macounii
Limnanthes vinculans

Section Inflexae:

Limnanthes alba
Limnanthes floccosa
Limnanthes montana
