= Andrena pulverea =

Scientific classification
- Domain: Eukaryota
- Kingdom: Animalia
- Phylum: Arthropoda
- Class: Insecta
- Order: Hymenoptera
- Family: Andrenidae
- Genus: Andrena
- Species: A. pulverea

Binomial name
- Andrena pulverea Viereck, 1916

Synonyms
- Andrena limnanthis Timberlake, 1951

Species of bee

Andrena pulverea is a species of mining bee in the family Andrenidae. It is found in North America.
