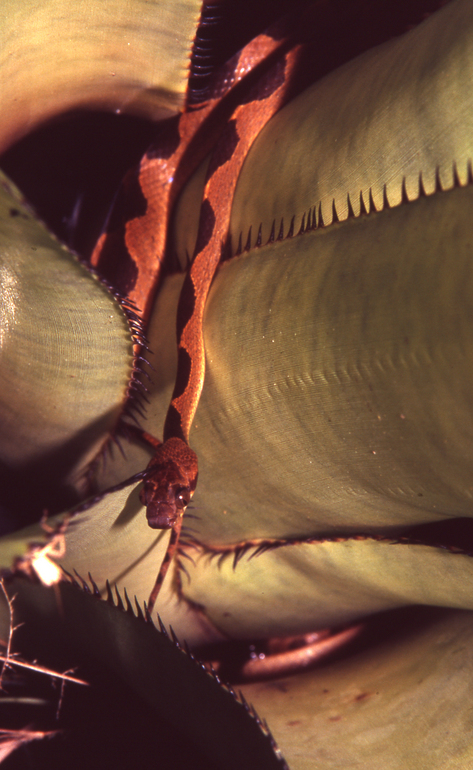
- Undulous dorsal stripe
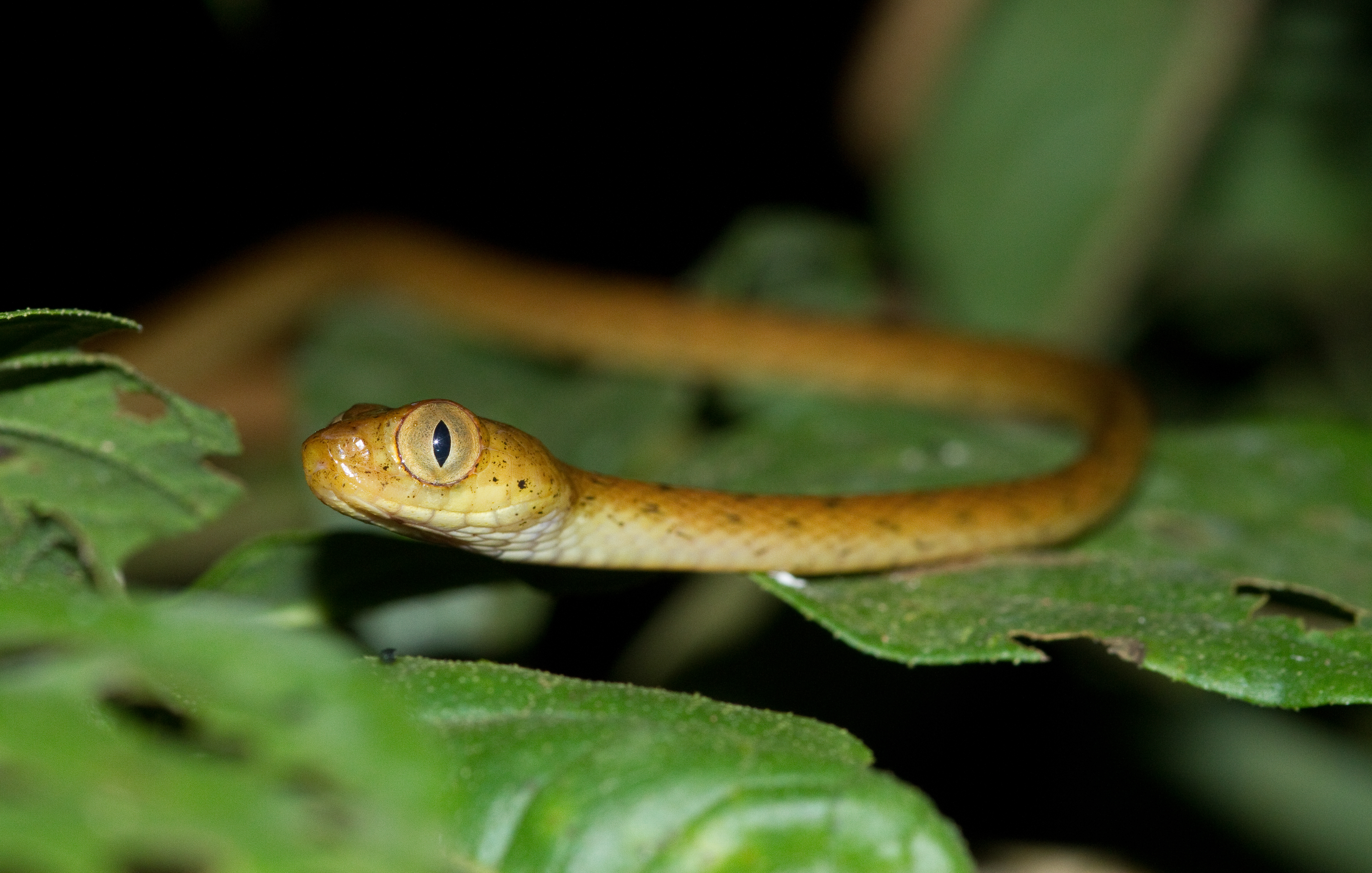
- Vertically elliptic pupil

Conservation status
- Least Concern (IUCN 3.1)

Scientific classification
- Kingdom: Animalia
- Phylum: Chordata
- Class: Reptilia
- Order: Squamata
- Suborder: Serpentes
- Family: Colubridae
- Genus: Leptodeira
- Species: L. annulata

Binomial name
- Leptodeira annulata (Linnaeus, 1758)

Synonyms
- Coluber annulatus Linnaeus, 1758; Dipsas annulata — Schlegel, 1837; Sibon annulata — Cope, 1860; Eteirodipsas annulata — Jan, 1863; Leptodira annulata — Boulenger, 1896; Leptodeira annulata — Amaral, 1929

= Leptodeira annulata =

Species of snake

Leptodeira annulata, also known commonly as the banded cat-eyed snake, is a species of mildly venomous, rear-fanged, snake in the subfamily Dipsadinae of the family Colubridae. The species is endemic to the New World.

== Common names ==
Additional common names for L. annulata include: cat-eyed night snake, come sapo, culebra de pantano, culebra destenida, machete savane, mapana de agua, mapana tigre, and ranera.

== Geographic range ==
L. annulata is found in Mexico, Central America, and South America, including the offshore islands of Margarita, and Trinidad and Tobago.

== Description ==
Adults of L. annulata have a total length (tail included) of about 750 mm (30 in) and are very slender. The head is distinct from the neck, and the large eyes have vertically elliptic pupils. The back is yellowish or brown with a series of dark brown or blackish spots often confluent into an undulous or zigzag stripe.

== Venom ==
L. annulata has a pair of enlarged, grooved teeth at the rear of each upper jaw (maxilla), and produces a mild venom.. The venom affects the snake's natural prey (mainly small frogs and small lizards). The snake tends not to bite humans when handled, but when it does, the venom has relatively mild effects in most individuals; some describe it as a slight irritating/itching sensation with slight swelling. The snake is not considered a risk to human health.

== Habitat ==
L. annulata inhabits moist areas. It tends to be found in forest (moist and dry forest) as well as in areas near forest edge, including well vegetated urbanized areas near the forest edge. It is often associated with riparian zones, as well as the margins of swamps and marshes.

== Behavior ==
L. annulata is nocturnal. It hunts and feeds in trees and on the ground.

== Diet ==
L. annulata preys on frogs, frog eggs, tadpoles, salamanders, and small reptiles such as lizards (including anoles) and smaller snakes, as well as fish. It may also feed on fledgling birds.

== Reproduction ==
Snakes of the genus Leptodeira are oviparous, sometimes exhibiting delayed fertilization. Their eggs have been found in the fungus gardens of Acromyrmex and Atta colombica ants.
