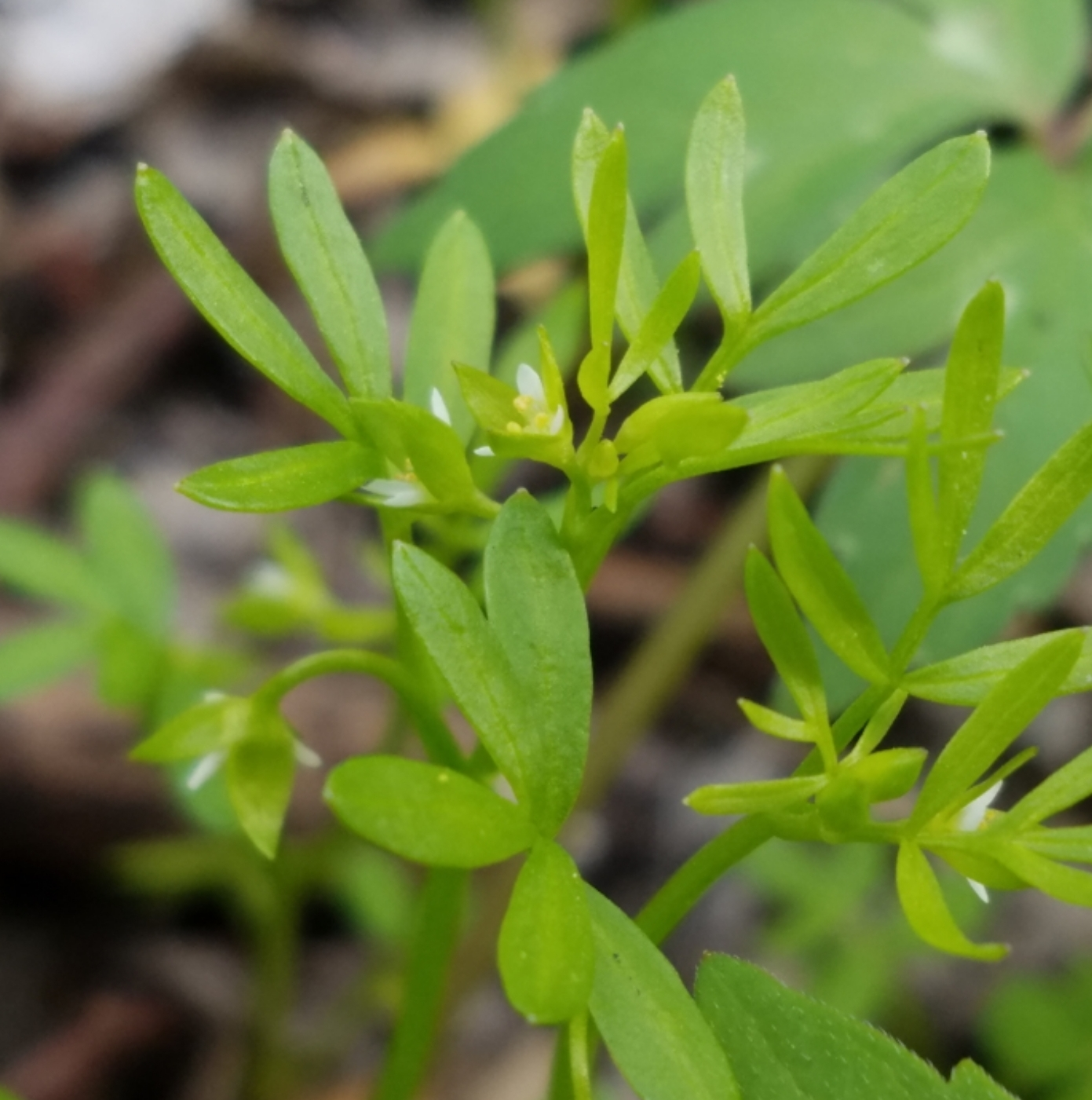
- Minute, white, three-parted flowers

Conservation status
- Secure (NatureServe)

Scientific classification
- Kingdom: Plantae
- Clade: Tracheophytes
- Clade: Angiosperms
- Clade: Eudicots
- Clade: Rosids
- Order: Brassicales
- Family: Limnanthaceae
- Genus: Floerkea; Willd.
- Species: F. proserpinacoides

Binomial name
- Floerkea proserpinacoides Willd.

Synonyms
- List: Cabomba pinnata (Pursh) Schult. & Schult.f.; Nectris pinnata Pursh; Floerkea lacustris Pers.; Floerkea occidentalis Rydb.; Floerkea palustris Nutt.; Floerkea uliginosa Muhl.

= Floerkea =

Genus of flowering plants

Floerkea is a monotypic genus of plants in the meadowfoam family containing the sole species Floerkea proserpinacoides, which is known by the common names false mermaid, false mermaidweed, and floerkea. This tiny wildflower is native to many parts of North America, where it is found in moist areas, such as shady forests. It is a fleshy, annual herb which grows short stems which may lie flat on the ground, tangle into a clump, or grow somewhat erect. The foliage is hairless and shiny. The leaves are divided into many oval-shaped, pointed leaflets up to 2 cm (0.79 in) long. The flower is a cup of pointed green sepals containing three tiny white spoon-shaped petals and a bunch of stamens with yellow anthers. Growing in the center of the flower are the two to three fruits, which are bumpy, spherical nutlets.

In Vermont, the plant was not seen after 1916 until May 2024 when it was seen again.

The logo for the Flora of North America is a Floerkea flower. The genus was named in honor of the German botanist, Heinrich Gustav Flörke.

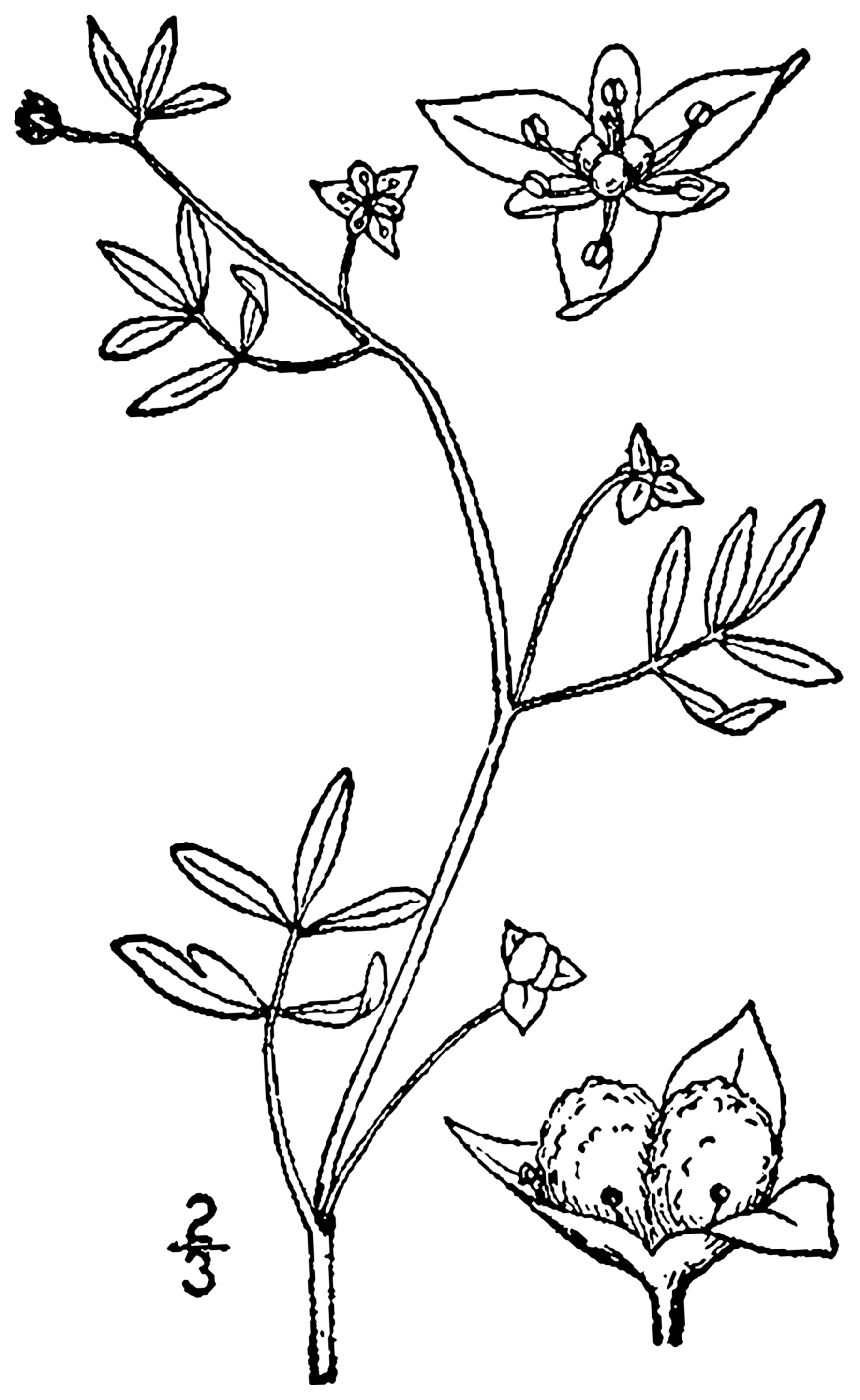
Botanical illustration

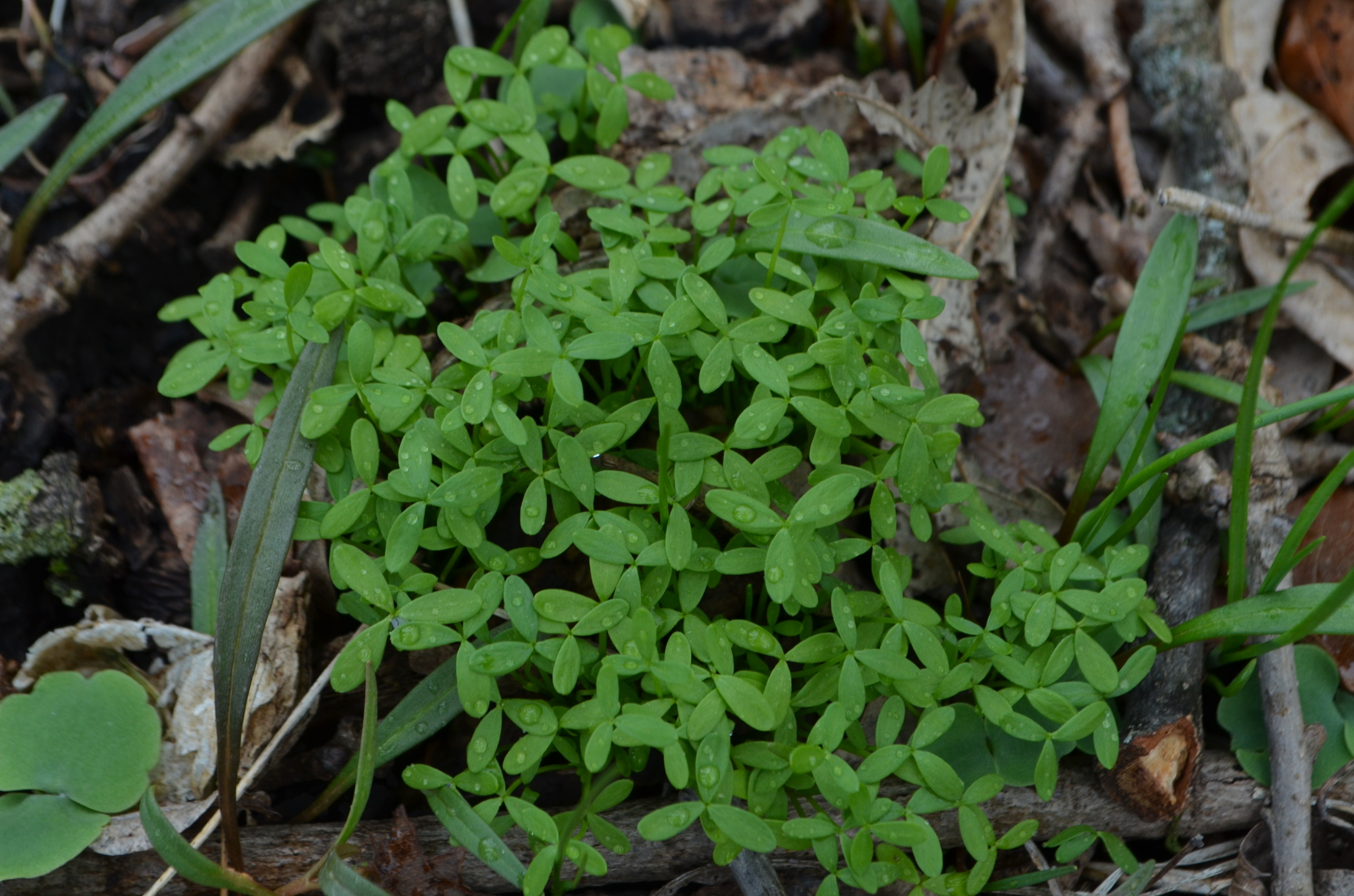
Three-parted cotyledons

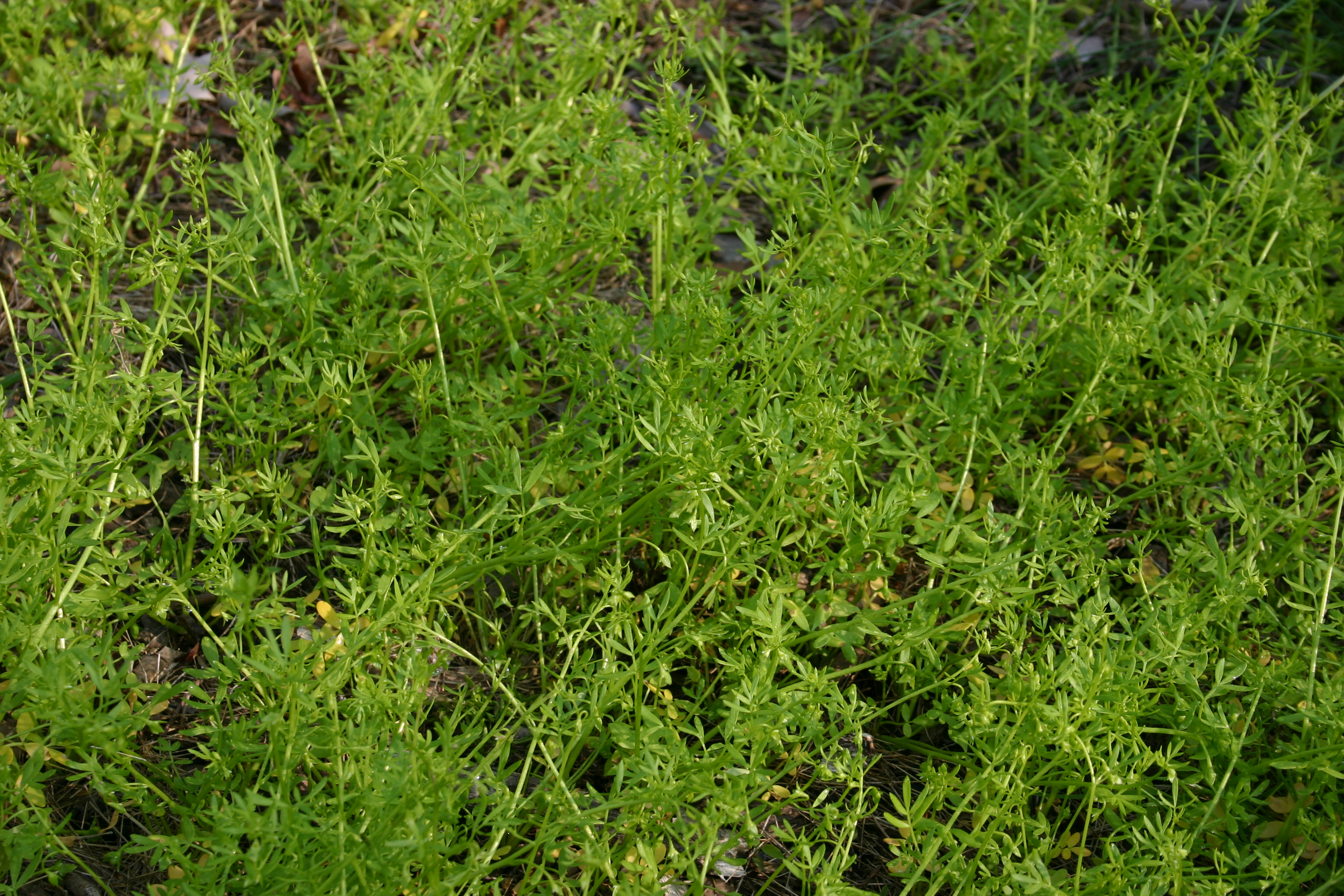
Mature plants
