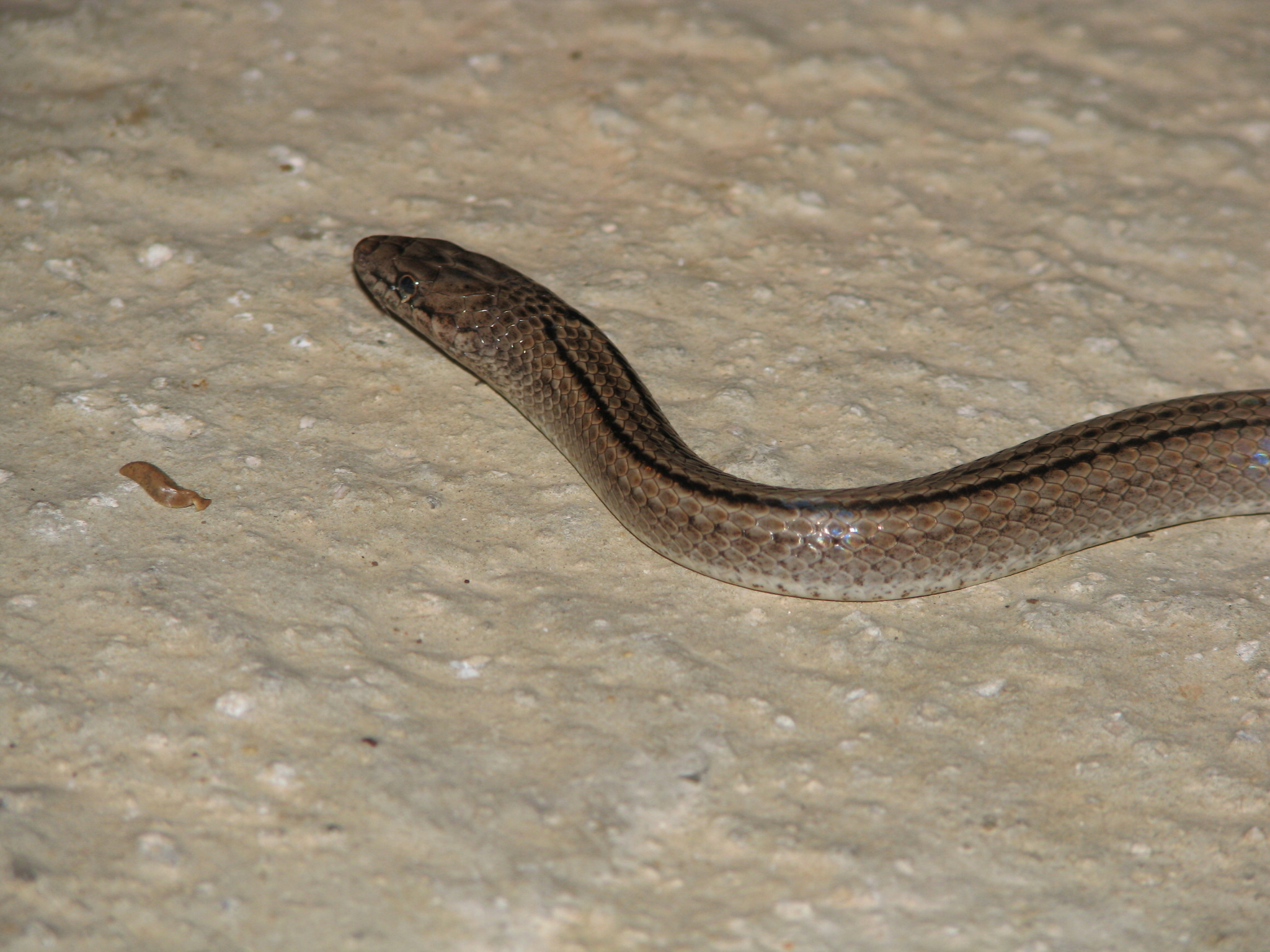

Conservation status
- Endangered (IUCN 3.1)

Scientific classification
- Kingdom: Animalia
- Phylum: Chordata
- Class: Reptilia
- Order: Squamata
- Suborder: Serpentes
- Family: Colubridae
- Genus: Erythrolamprus
- Species: E. triscalis

Binomial name
- Erythrolamprus triscalis (Linnaeus, 1758)

= Erythrolamprus triscalis =

Species of snake

Erythrolamprus triscalis, the three-scaled ground snake, is a species of snake in the family Colubridae. The species is found on the island of Curacao (part of the Kingdom of the Netherlands), in South America.
