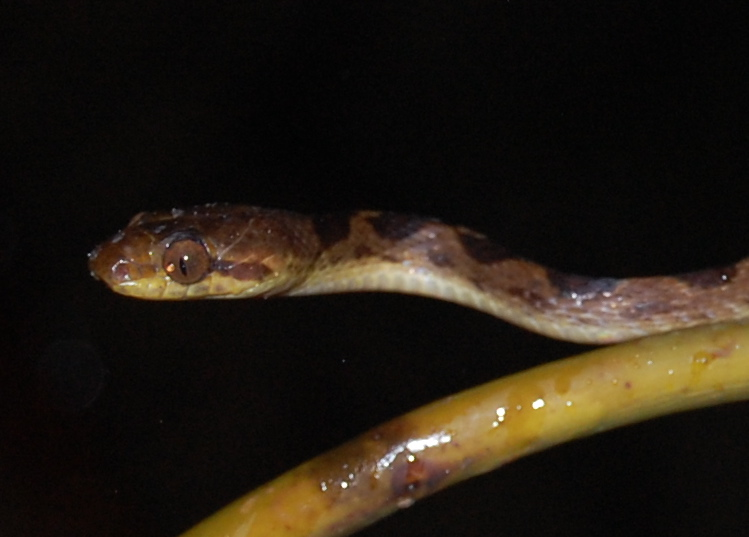
- Northern cat-eyed snake (Leptodeira septentrionalis), in Osa Peninsula, Costa Rica

Scientific classification
- Kingdom: Animalia
- Phylum: Chordata
- Class: Reptilia
- Order: Squamata
- Suborder: Serpentes
- Family: Colubridae
- Subfamily: Dipsadinae
- Genus: Leptodeira; Fitzinger, 1843

Species
- 18, see text

Synonyms
- Megalops Hallowell 1860 [1861]; Leptodira Cope 1866; Anoplophallus Cope 1893

= Leptodeira =

Genus of snakes

Leptodeira is a genus of snakes, commonly referred to as cat-eyed snakes, in the subfamily Dipsadinae of the family Colubridae. The genus consists of 18 species that are native to primarily Mexico and Central America, but range as far north as the Rio Grande Valley region of Texas in United States and as far south as Argentina in South America.

== Species and subspecies ==
The following species and subspecies are recognized as being valid.

- Leptodeira annulata (Linnaeus, 1758) – banded cat-eyed snake
- Leptodeira approximans (Günther, 1872)
- Leptodeira ashmeadii (Hallowell, 1845) – banded cat-eyed snake
- Leptodeira bakeri Ruthven, 1936 – Baker's cat-eyed snake
- Leptodeira frenata (Cope, 1886) – rainforest cat-eyed snake
  - Leptodeira frenata frenata (Cope, 1886)
  - Leptodeira frenata malleisi Dunn & L. Stuart, 1935
  - Leptodeira frenata yucatanensis (Cope, 1887)
- Leptodeira larcorum Schmidt & Walker, 1943
- Leptodeira maculata (Hallowell, 1861) – southwestern cat-eyed snake
- Leptodeira misinawui Torres-Carvajal, Sánchez-Nivicela, Posse, Celi & Koch, 2020
- Leptodeira nigrofasciata Günther, 1868 – black-banded cat-eyed snake
- Leptodeira ornata (Bocourt, 1884) – northern cat-eyed snake
- Leptodeira pulchriceps (Duellman, 1958)
- Leptodeira punctata (W. Peters, 1866) – western cat-eyed snake
- Leptodeira rhombifera (Günther, 1872)
- Leptodeira rubricata (Cope, 1893) – Costa Rican cat-eyed snake
- Leptodeira septentrionalis Kennicott, 1859 – northern cat-eyed snake
- Leptodeira splendida (Günther, 1895) – splendid cat-eyed snake
  - Leptodeira splendida bressoni Taylor, 1938
  - Leptodeira splendida ephippiata H.M. Smith & W. Tanner, 1944
  - Leptodeira splendida splendida (Günther, 1895)
- Leptodeira tarairiu Costa, Graboski, Grazziotin, Zaher, Rodrigues & Prudente, 2022
- Leptodeira uribei Bautista & H.M. Smith, 1992 – Uribe's cat-eyed snake, Uribe's false cat-eyed snake

Nota bene: In the above list, a binomial authority or trinomial authority in parentheses indicates that the species or subspecies was originally described in a genus other than Leptodeira.
