= Agate Desert =

Prairie in Oregon, United States

Coordinates: 42.42917°N 122.89722°W

The Agate Desert is a prairie located near White City, Oregon, 53 acres (21 ha) of which is protected as the Agate Desert Preserve. The area is not in fact a desert as its name suggests; it is so named because of the abundance of agate, petrified wood, jasper, and other minerals found there. Much of the World War II army training base of Camp White was built in the Agate Desert. The Nature Conservancy is working to preserve the Agate Desert as a native Rogue River Valley grassland.

== Ecosystem ==
The area contains seasonal vernal pools that act as their own self-sufficient ecosystems. When the pools have dried up in the late spring, rings of wildflowers bloom in their place and the various plants and animals enter a period of dormancy until the next spring. The pools contain a rare species of fairy shrimp. The Agate Desert is also the only known place where the endangered big-flowered woolly meadowfoam plants grow and the desert contains over 500 of the plants. Cook's lomatium or Cook's Desert Parsley is also found in the Agate Desert and only grows naturally elsewhere in the French Flat of Illinois Valley, also in Oregon. In 1998, Henri Dumont discovered a new species, Dumontia oregonensis, also known as the Hairy Water Flea, in the desert, and it is not known to live anywhere else.

== Preservation ==
Ecologists are currently conducting prescribed burns to the area, and volunteers are then spreading seeds of the native grasses and wildflowers in order to restore them to the area. Ecologists are also studying the various species, many of them rare, in the vernal pools. Development in the valley has left it at only about 25% of its original size.
