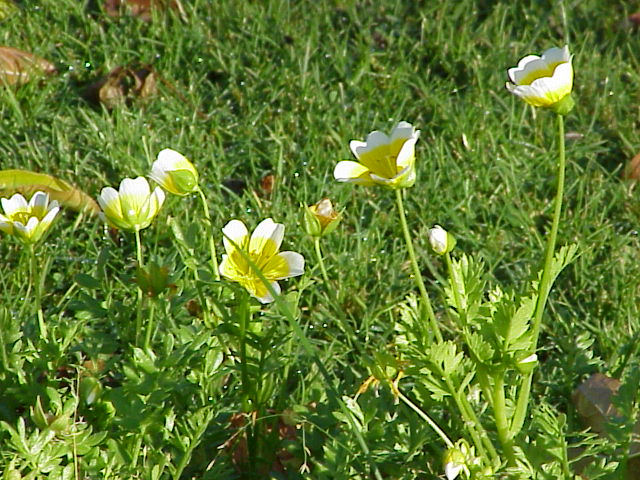
- Limnanthes douglasii

Scientific classification
- Kingdom: Plantae
- Clade: Tracheophytes
- Clade: Angiosperms
- Clade: Eudicots
- Clade: Rosids
- Order: Brassicales
- Family: Limnanthaceae; R.Br.

Genera
- Floerkea; Limnanthes

= Limnanthaceae =

Family of flowering plants

The Limnanthaceae are a small family of annual herbs occurring throughout temperate North America. There are eight species and nineteen taxa currently recognized. Members of this family are prominent in vernal pool communities of California. Some taxa have been domesticated for use as an oil seed crop. Some members are listed as threatened or endangered and have been the focus of disputes over development plans (e.g. Limnanthes floccosa subsp. californica, Limnanthes vinculans).

The Limnanthaceae are members of a recently identified clade (Brassicales) of mustard oil producing plants. They have a sharp flavor similar to mustard greens, radish or capers.

Two genera are recognized in the family. The monotypic genus Floerkea inhabits shaded, vernally wet habitats in eastern North American deciduous forests, high montane islands in the great basin and humid coniferous forests along the northwest coast. All seven species of Limnanthes, with one British Columbian exception, occur solely in the California Floristic Province, most commonly occupying grassland or savanna vernal pool habitats. Various taxa of this genus are prominent elements in the flora of the Great Central Valley "hogwallow" communities, the coastal prairie, and wet meadows of the Coast Ranges and the Sierra Nevada/Cascade foothills up to 1800 meters. Disjunct populations occur in the Peninsular Ranges just north of the Mexican border and in the Umpqua River valley of central Oregon. In favorable years Limnanthes can cover large areas with white flowers (hence the common name Meadowfoam) and in hogwallow habitats sometimes forms spectacular rings surrounding the deepest parts of the pools.

Two sorts of flowers are found in the family, reflecting different breeding systems: some taxa have inconspicuous perianths and reproduce largely by self-pollination. Others have large, showy flowers, usually pentamerous and white, some with varying amounts of yellow or ultraviolet, others with prominent rose or brown veins and anthers. These are fully to predominantly outcrossing, usually pollinated by species of solitary bees in the genera Panurginus, Andrena and Hesperandrina.

The Flora of North America Project has chosen a line drawing of Floerkea to serve as its logo because of this taxon's ubiquitous (but obscure) occurrence in many areas of North America, and the diverse aspects of the family including economic and horticultural value, endangered species status and fruitful subject of scientific research.

== Taxonomy ==
Limnanthaceae currently consist of two genera, eight species and nineteen taxa.

| Genus | Section | Taxon |
|---|---|---|
| Floerkea Willdenow | | Floerkea proserpinacoides Willdenow |
| Limnanthes R.Brown | Limnanthes | L. bakeri J.T.Howell |
| Limnanthes R.Brown | Limnanthes | L. douglasii R. Brown subsp. douglasii |
| Limnanthes R.Brown | Limnanthes | L. douglasii subsp. sulphurea C.T.Mason |
| Limnanthes R.Brown | Limnanthes | L. douglasii subsp. nivea C.T.Mason |
| Limnanthes R.Brown | Limnanthes | L. douglasii subsp. rosea (Hartw. in Benth.) C.T.Mason |
| Limnanthes R.Brown | Limnanthes | L. douglasii subsp. striata (Jepson) Morin |
| Limnanthes R.Brown | Limnanthes | L. macounii Trel. |
| Limnanthes R.Brown | Limnanthes | L. vinculans Ornduff |
| Limnanthes R.Brown | Inflexae | L. alba Hartw. ex Benth. subsp. alba |
| Limnanthes R.Brown | Inflexae | L. alba subsp. versicolor (Greene) C.T. Mason |
| Limnanthes R.Brown | Inflexae | L. alba subsp. gracilis (Howell) Morin |
| Limnanthes R.Brown | Inflexae | L. alba subsp. parishii (Jepson) Morin |
| Limnanthes R.Brown | Inflexae | L. floccosa Howell subsp. floccosa |
| Limnanthes R.Brown | Inflexae | L. floccosa subsp. bellingeriana (M.E.Peck) Arroyo |
| Limnanthes R.Brown | Inflexae | L. floccosa subsp. californica Arroyo |
| Limnanthes R.Brown | Inflexae | L. floccosa subsp. grandiflora Arroyo |
| Limnanthes R.Brown | Inflexae | L. floccosa subsp. pumila (Howell) Arroyo |
| Limnanthes R.Brown | Inflexae | L. montana Jepson |

== Morphology ==
Limnanthaceae are all herbaceous annuals. Leaves are alternate, simple or compound with pinnate venation. Flowers are produced singly in the axils of leaves. They have 3, 4 or 5 petals, mostly white. Fruits are ridged or tuberculate schizocarps (nutlets).

== Systematics of Limnanthaceae ==
When Robert Brown created the family Limnanthaceae in 1833 he declared that, "the place of this new family is not absolutely determined; but it is suggested that in two remarkable points of its structure, namely, the presence of glands subtending the alternate filaments, and the existence of a gynobase, it more nearly approaches to Hypogynous families than to Perigynous, with which it has hitherto been associated". Ultimately he demurred from assigning a systematic position to his family. Subsequent taxonomists promoted various divergent placements. Bentham and Hooker (1862) decided that given the great similarity of Limnanthes and Floerkea to taxa in the Geraniaceae, family status was not warranted; accordingly, they placed both genera in the tribe Limnantheae in that family. Engler and Prantl (1896), however, disagreed, noting that the position of the seed indicated the family should be placed in the Sapindales.

Most recent authors of taxonomic treatises have maintained the family Limnanthaceae but placed it in the order Geraniales, including Thorne (1976) Cronquist (1988), who nevertheless states that Limnanthaceae are, "without...obvious affinities..." and Takhtajan (1980). Hutchinson (1973), proposed that Limnanthaceae should be included in Geraniales, but its similarity to Caryophyllales (which he believed is derived from Geraniales) suggested that Limnanthaceae form a link between these two groups.

A number of studies over the years have noted various morphological, developmental and embryological characters at variance with the Geraniales (as well as other groups to which Limnanthaceae have been assigned). Maheshwari and Johri (1956) conducted an extensive investigation of the morphology of Floerkea noting that, among other things, the herbaceous habit, gynobasic style, unusual type of tetrasporic embryo sac and basal parietal placentation of the unitegmic, tenuinucellate ovules differ from the Geraniales which has among its woody to herbaceous members, (at most) lobed syncarpous gynoecia, monosporic embryo sacs, generally axile placentation and bitegmic, crassinucellate ovules. Additionally the fruit type of Limnanthaceae, a schizocarpic nutlet, is unlike anything in the Geraniales most of which produce capsules. They also found a number of key differences between Limnanthaceae and Sapindales, and concluded that Limnanthaceae should be given their own order.

Hofmann and Ludewig (1985) undertook a similar detailed study of the morphology of Limnanthes douglasii and made systematic inferences from their findings. They concluded that there is nothing in the morphology to suggest a relationship to the Coriariaceae (suggested by Chatin in 1856), Geraniales or the Sapindales (sensu Cronquist), though they allow that the, "level in evolution is about the same...." They also rejected any meaningful similarity between Limnanthaceae and Tropaeolaceae, as suggested by Dahlgren, who noted the shared possession of certain phytochemicals (glucosinolate, myrosinase, erucic acid and eicosenoic acid). They rejected this connection on the grounds that these phytochemicals also occur in the Brassicaceae which is assumed to be unrelated and suggest that the secondary compounds must be convergent. They concluded that the systematic position of Limnanthaceae is uncertain and cannot be presently determined.

Dahlgren (1975), who believed strongly in the systematic value of secondary chemicals, placed Limnanthaceae in Capparales with Brassicaceae. He later (1980) placed Limnanthaceae together with Tropaeolaceae in the order Tropaeolales.

Buchner, Halbritter, Prundner and Hesse (1990) investigated the pollen morphology of Limnanthaceae and discovered that the zonosulcate morphology is unlike the pollen of any known angiosperm and therefore relationships cannot be inferred from it. They reiterated Maheshwari and Johri's suggestion that a new order, the Limnanthales, should be created to contain the family.

Rodman (1991a, b) included Limnanthaceae in a twin phenetic and cladistic analysis of all 15 taxa then known to produce glucosinolates. In UPGMA phenograms, Limnanthaceae clustered with Balsaminaceae. Similarly, cladistic analysis showed Limnanthaceae either in a clade with Balsaminaceae and sometimes Pentadiplandraceae or in a polytomy with Balsaminaceae, Pentadiplandraceae, Caricacaeae, Centrospermae, and a clade which includes all the rest of the glucosinolate taxa (except Drypetes).

Rodman et al. (1993, 1997) assembled additional DNA sequence data sets for glucosinolate taxa and applied cladistic methods to generate hypotheses about relationship. They discovered that all the glucosinolate-producing taxa save Drypetes, form a clade. Despite the paucity of morphological synapomorphies (and therefore, to the surprise of many taxonomists), rbcL sequences have provided well supported evidence for the group's monophyly. 18S nuclear ribosomal DNA sequences have similarly, though less certainly, indicated a common ancestor for all the glucosinolate containing plants except Drypetes.

The Angiosperm Phylogeny Group places Limnanthaceae in Brassicales, which is in the Malvid/Rosid II lineage.
