= Lenomyrmex hoelldobleri =

Scientific classification
- Kingdom: Animalia
- Phylum: Arthropoda
- Clade: Pancrustacea
- Class: Insecta
- Order: Hymenoptera
- Family: Formicidae
- Subfamily: Myrmicinae
- Genus: Lenomyrmex
- Species: L. hoelldobleri

Binomial name
- Lenomyrmex hoelldobleri Rabeling, Sosa-Calvo, O'Connell, Coloma & Fernández, 2016

Species of ant

Lenomyrmex hoelldobleri is a species of ant known only from a single specimen found in the stomach of a "devil frog" (Oophaga sylvatica) in Ecuador.

Dunn's earth snake (Geophis dunni) is another creature which has only been found in the stomach of another animal, in this case the coral snake (Micrurus nigrocinctus) in 1932, and several other as-yet-undescribed insects were found alongside Lenomyrmex hoelldobleri in the "devil frog"'s stomach.
