= Hydromorphus concolor =

Conservation status
- Least Concern (IUCN 3.1)

Scientific classification
- Kingdom: Animalia
- Phylum: Chordata
- Class: Reptilia
- Order: Squamata
- Suborder: Serpentes
- Family: Colubridae
- Genus: Hydromorphus
- Species: H. concolor

Binomial name
- Hydromorphus concolor Peters, 1859

Species of snake

Hydromorphus concolor, also known as the Costa Rica water snake, is a snake of the colubrid family. It is moderately-sized, growing to lengths of 690 mm (27 in) for males and 797 mm (31.4 in) for females. It is widely distributed in Central America from Guatemala south to Panama. It inhabits freshwater rainforest streams in dense lowland and premontane rainforests. It feeds on small crabs, frogs, fish, and Atya shrimp. It is classified as being of least-concern on the IUCN Red List.

== Taxonomy ==
The German naturalist Wilhelm Peters formally described the species Hydromorphus concolor in 1859 based on a specimen from Costa Rica, erecting the genus Hydromorphus for it in the same publication. In 1942, the American herpetologist Emmett Reid Dunn described the species Hydromorphus clarki based on specimens from Panama, but that species was subsequently synonymized with concolor. The specific epithet is derived from the Latin word meaning "uniformly colored", alluding to its unicolor dorsal coloration. It has the common name Costa Rica water snake.

== Description ==
Costa Rica water snakes are moderately-sized, growing to lengths of 690 mm (27 in) for males and 797 mm (31.4 in) for females. It is characterised by having one internasal scale, one loreal scale that touches the eye, a preocular scale above the loreal scale, and one prefrontal shield.

== Distribution and ecology ==
The Costa Rica water snake is widely distributed in Central America from Guatemala south to Panama. It is a semiaquatic species that spend much of its time in freshwater rainforest streams. It is found in dense lowland and premontane rainforests and is mainly a nocturnal species. It has been recorded to elevations of up to 1,500 m (4,900 ft).

The Costa Rica water snake feeds on small crabs, frogs, fish, and Atya shrimp. Both snakes lay eggs to reproduce. In the Costa Rica water snake, eggs are laid in clutches of eight or less and take around 94 days to hatch. The eggs are 33–44 mm (1.3–1.7 in) long and 14–16 mm (0.55–0.63 in) wide and weigh 6.1–6.6 g (0.22–0.23 oz). The Costa Rica water snake has been documented being predated upon by Erythrolamprus bizona. Other potential predators of the genus include turtles, birds, and other snakes such as Micrurus species.

== Conservation ==
The Costa Rica water was classified as being of least-concern on the global IUCN Red List and endangered on the Panamanian Red List as of 2026. A 2026 study of the genera Hydromorphus and Tretanorhinus recommended that the water snake be classified as vulnerable on the national list and least-concern on the global list.
