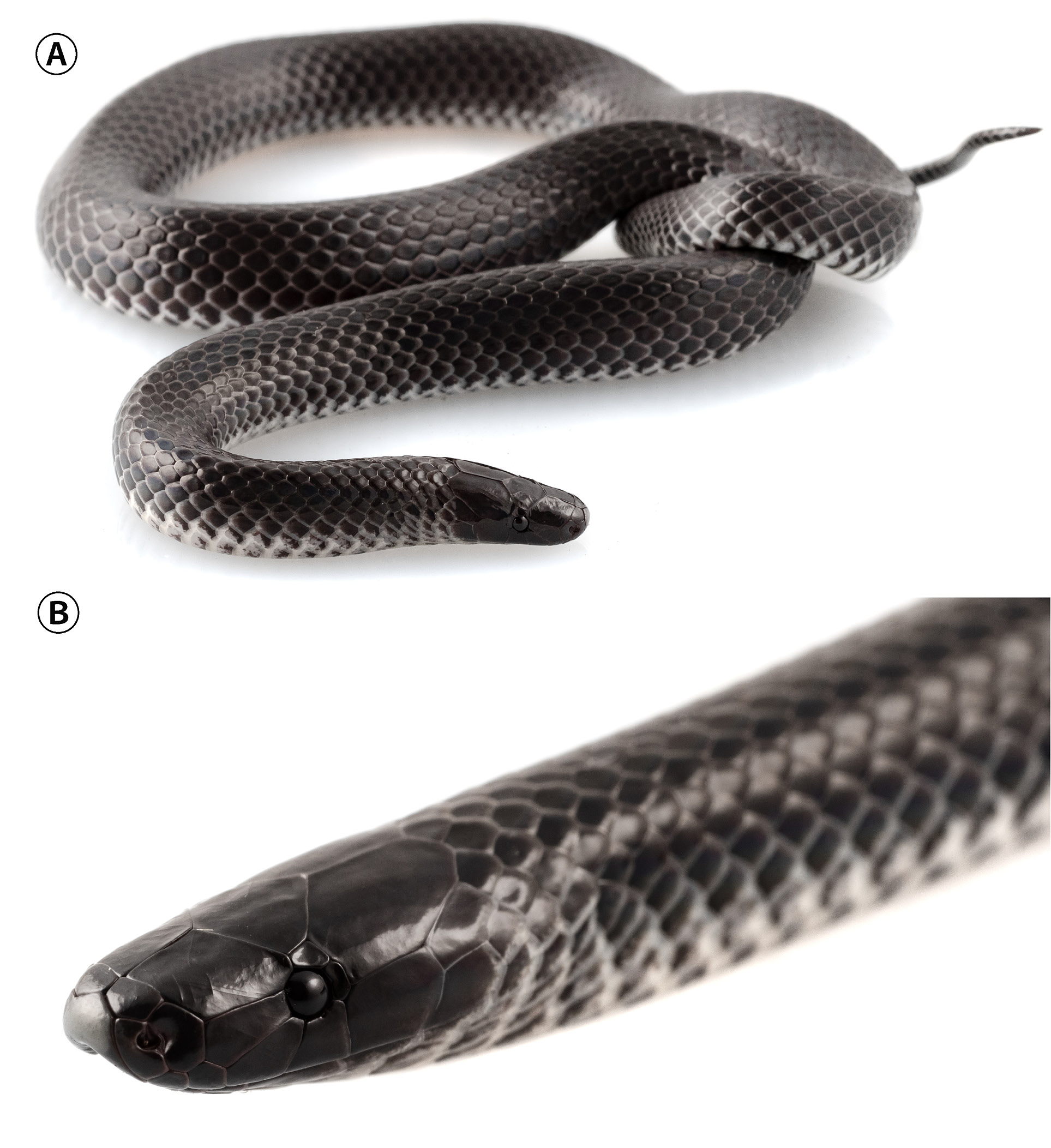
- Geophis nigroalbus

Scientific classification
- Kingdom: Animalia
- Phylum: Chordata
- Class: Reptilia
- Order: Squamata
- Suborder: Serpentes
- Family: Colubridae
- Subfamily: Dipsadinae
- Genus: Geophis; Wagler, 1830

= Geophis =

Genus of snakes

Geophis is a genus of snakes in the subfamily Dipsadinae of the family Colubridae of the superfamily Colubroidea. Species in the genus Geophis are commonly referred to as Latin American earth snakes (Spanish: culebra minera or culebra minadora). The genus consists of 53 distinct species.

== Species ==
The following species are recognized as being valid.

- Geophis annuliferus Boulenger, 1894 – western snail-eating snake
- Geophis anocularis Dunn, 1920 – Sierra Mije earth snake
- Geophis bellus Myers, 2003
- Geophis berillus Barragán-Reséndiz, Pavón-Vázquez, Cervantes-Burgos, Trujano-Ortego, Canseco-Márquez & García-Vázquez, 2022
- Geophis betaniensis J.H. Restrepo & J.W. Wright, 1987 – Betanien earth snake
- Geophis bicolor Günther, 1868 – Mexican plateau earth snake
- Geophis blanchardi Taylor & H.M. Smith, 1939 – Blanchard's earth snake
- Geophis brachycephalus (Cope, 1871) – Costa Rican earth snake
- Geophis cancellatus H.M. Smith, 1941 – Chiapas earth snake
- Geophis cansecoi C. Grünwald, Ahumada-Carrillo, A. Grünwald, Montaño-Ruvalcaba & García-Vázquez, 2021
- Geophis carinosus L.C. Stuart, 1941 – keeled earth snake
- Geophis chalybeus (Wagler, 1830) – Veracruz earth snake
- Geophis championi Boulenger, 1894 – Panamenian earth snake
- Geophis damiani Wilson, McCranie & K.L. Williams, 1998
- Geophis downsi Savage, 1981 – Down's earth snake, Savage's earth snake
- Geophis dubius (W. Peters, 1861) – Mesa del Sur earth snake
- Geophis duellmani H.M. Smith & Holland, 1969 – Sierra Juarez earth snake
- Geophis dugesii Bocourt, 1883 – Dugès's earth snake
- Geophis dunni K.P. Schmidt, 1932 – Dunn's earth snake
- Geophis fulvoguttatus Mertens, 1952 – Mertens's earth snake
- Geophis godmani Boulenger, 1894 – Godman's earth snake
- Geophis hoffmanni (W. Peters, 1859) – Hoffmann's earth snake
- Geophis immaculatus Downs, 1967 – Downs's earth snake
- Geophis incomptus Duellman, 1959 – Sierra Coalcoman earth snake'
- Geophis isthmicus (Boulenger, 1894) – isthmian earth snake
- Geophis juarezi Nieto-Montes de Oca, 2003 – Benito Juarez's earth snake
- Geophis juliai Pérez-Higareda, H.M. Smith & López-Luna, 2001 – Zurtuche's earth snake
- Geophis laticinctus H.M. Smith & K.L. Williams, 1963 – Mesa Central earth snake
- Geophis laticollaris H.M. Smith, Lynch & Altig, 1965 – widecollar earth snake
- Geophis latifrontalis Garman, 1883 – Potosí earth snake
- Geophis lorancai Canseco-Márquez, Pavón-Vázquez, López-Luna & Nieto-Montes de Oca, 2016
- Geophis maculiferus Taylor, 1941 – Michoacán earth snake
- Geophis mutitorques (Cope, 1885) – highland earth snake
- Geophis nasalis (Cope, 1868) – coffee earth snake
- Geophis nephodrymus Townsend & Wilson, 2006
- Geophis nigroalbus Boulenger, 1908 – Colombian earth snake
- Geophis nigrocinctus Duellman, 1959 – black-banded earth snake
- Geophis occabus Pavón-Vázquez, García-Vázquez, Blancas-Hernández & Nieto-Montes de Oca, 2011
- Geophis omiltemanus Günther, 1893 – Guerreran earth snake
- Geophis petersii Boulenger, 1894 – Peters's earth snake
- Geophis pyburni Campbell & Murphy, 1977 – Pyburn's earth snake
- Geophis rhodogaster (Cope, 1868) – rosebelly earth snake
- Geophis rostralis (Jan, 1865) –Sierra Madre earth snake
- Geophis ruthveni F. Werner, 1925 – Ruthven's earth snake
- Geophis sallaei Boulenger, 1894 – Sallae's earth snake
- Geophis sanniolus Cope, 1863 – pygmy snail sucker
- Geophis sartorii Cope, 1863 – terrestrial snail sucker
- Geophis semidoliatus (A.M.C. Duméril, Bibron & A.H.A. Duméril, 1854) – coral earth snake
- Geophis sieboldi (Jan, 1862) – Siebold's earth snake
- Geophis talamancae Lips & Savage, 1994
- Geophis tarascae Hartweg, 1959 – Tarascan earth snake
- Geophis tectus Savage & J.I. Watling, 2008
- Geophis turbidus Pavón-Vázquez, Canseco-Márquez & Nieto-Montes de Oca, 2013
- Geophis zeledoni Taylor, 1954

Nota bene: A binomial authority in parentheses indicates that the species was originally described in a genus other than Geophis.
