= Micrurus nebularis =

Conservation status
- Data Deficient (IUCN 3.1)

Scientific classification
- Kingdom: Animalia
- Phylum: Chordata
- Class: Reptilia
- Order: Squamata
- Suborder: Serpentes
- Family: Elapidae
- Genus: Micrurus
- Species: M. nebularis

Binomial name
- Micrurus nebularis Roze, 1989
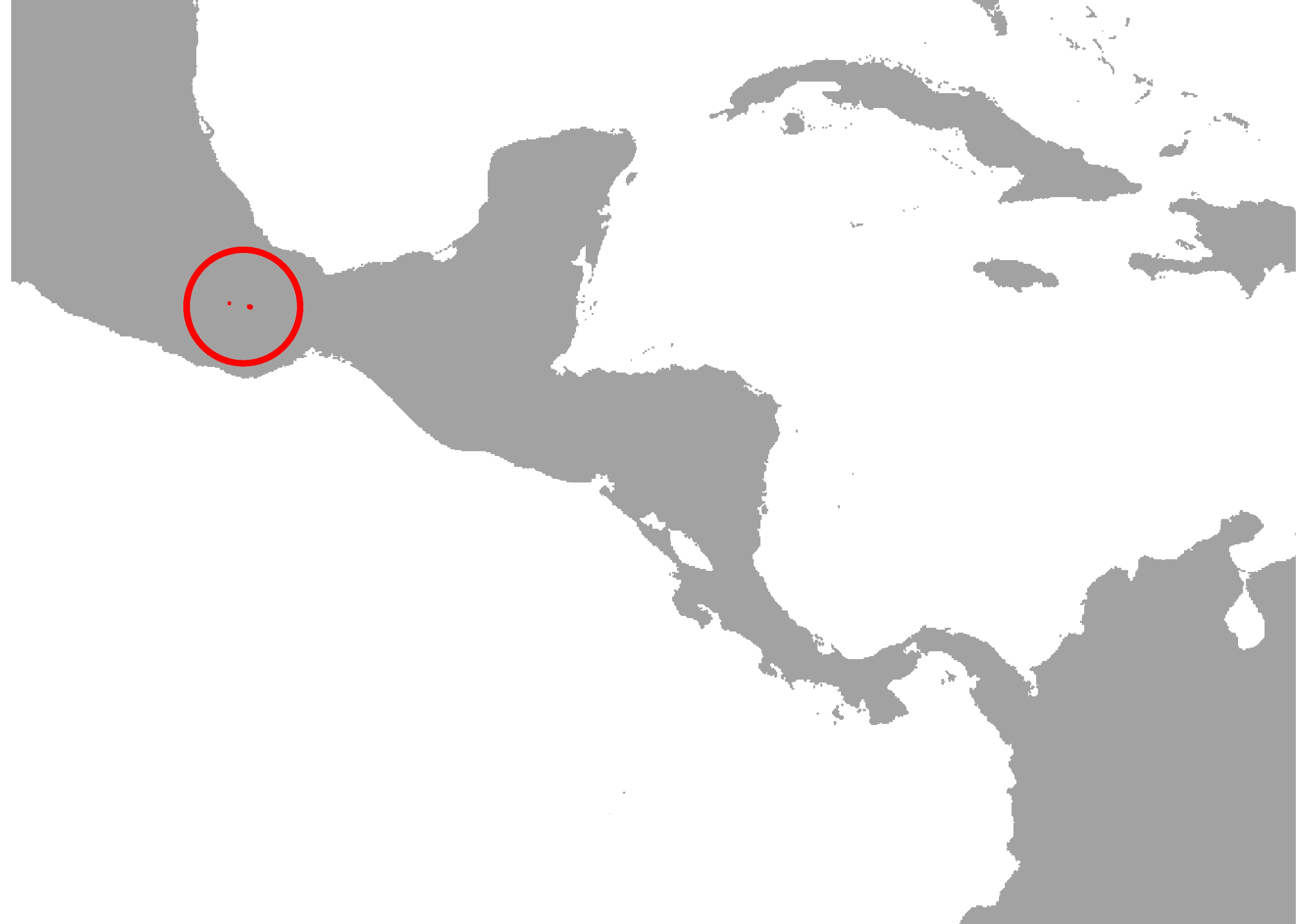

Species of snake

Micrurus nebularis, also known commonly as the cloud forest coral snake and the Neblina coral snake, is a species of venomous snake in the family Elapidae. The species is native to southern Mexico.

== Description ==
Micrurus nebularis is a small species for its genus. The holotype, which is the longest specimen measured, has a total length (tail included) of 55.7 cm (21.9 in).

The color pattern consists of red, yellow, and black rings. The black rings are not arranged in triads. The color pattern is very similar to that of Micrurus fulvius, but without black-tipped scales within the red rings. The black rings number 23–24 in males, 26–28 in females.

Males lack supraanal tubercles.

== Geographic distribution ==
Micrurus nebularis is found in the Mexican states of Oaxaca and Puebla, in the Sierra Madre del Sur.

== Habitat ==
The preferred natural habitat of Micrurus nebularis is pine–oak forest, at elevations of 1,585–2,256 m (5,200–7,402 ft).

== Behavior ==
Micrurus nebularis is terrestrial, and it is both nocturnal and crepuscular.

== Diet ==
Micrurus nebularis preys on small terrestrial snakes such as Geophis dubius.

== Reproduction ==
Micrurus nebularis is oviparous.

== Taxonomy ==
Reyes-Velasco et al. (2020) suggested that Micrurus nebularis may be a synonym of Micrurus ephippifer along with Micrurus bogerti, Micrurus browni, and Micrurus pachecogili.
