= Hydromorphus =

Scientific classification
- Kingdom: Animalia
- Phylum: Chordata
- Class: Reptilia
- Order: Squamata
- Suborder: Serpentes
- Family: Colubridae
- Subfamily: Dipsadinae
- Genus: Hydromorphus; W. Peters, 1859

Genus of snakes

Hydromorphus, the Central American watersnakes, is a genus of snakes in the subfamily Dipsadinae. It has two species, the Costa Rica water snake and Dunn's water snake. These snakes are native to Central America, where they are found from Guatemala south to Panama. They are semiaquatic species that spend much of their time in freshwater rainforest streams in dense lowland and premontane rainforests. They are mainly nocturnal and feed on small crabs, frogs, fish, and Atya shrimp. They are moderately-sized, growing to lengths of 690 mm (27 in) for males and 797 mm (31.4 in) for females. They have dark gray or brown uppersides and yellow to cream undersides with grayish spots along the margins of the ventral scales.

== Taxonomy ==
The genus Hydromorphus was erected in 1859 by the German naturalist Wilhelm Peters for the species Hydromorphus concolor, which he described in the same publication based on a specimen from Costa Rica. Hydromorphus dunni was formally described in 1942 based on a specimen collected from near Boquete in the Panamanian province of Chiriquí. The name of the genus is derived from the Greek words hydor, meaning water, and morphe, meaning shape, and allude to the aquatic habitat these snakes prefer. They are known by the English common name Central American watersnakes.

Two species are recognized as being valid.

- Hydromorphus concolor W. Peters, 1859 - Costa Rica water snake
- Hydromorphus dunni Slevin, 1942 - Dunn's water snake

== Description ==
Central American watersnakes are moderately-sized, growing to lengths of 690 mm (27 in) for males and 797 mm (31.4 in) for females. They have dark gray or brown uppersides and yellow to cream undersides with grayish spots along the margins of the ventral scales. The head is round with small eyes and the tail is fairly short. The scales of the dorsum are smooth rather than keeled. The Costa Rica water snake is characterised by having one internasal scale, one loreal scale that touches the eye, a preocular scale above the loreal scale, and one prefrontal shield. Dunn's water snake is characterised by having two internasal scales, one loreal scale that is distinct from the eye, an elongated preocular scale that touches the supraocular and the third supralabial scales, and one to three prefrontal scales.

== Distribution ==
The snakes of this genus are found in Central America. The Costa Rica water snake is widely distributed in Central America from Guatemala south to Panama. Dunn's water snake, on the other hand, is a Panamanian endemic, with a range stretching from Chiriquí east to the provinces of Colón and Panamá Oeste. Both snakes are semiaquatic species that spend much of their time in freshwater rainforest streams. It is found in dense lowland and premontane rainforests and is mainly a nocturnal species.

Dunn's water snake is poorly-studied and most aspects of its ecology are not known. The Costa Rica water snake is better understood; it feeds on small crabs, frogs, fish, and Atya shrimp. Both snakes lay eggs to reproduce. In the Costa Rica water snake, eggs are laid in clutches of eight or less and take around 94 days to hatch. The eggs are 33–44 mm (1.3–1.7 in) long and 14–16 mm (0.55–0.63 in) wide and weigh 6.1–6.6 g (0.22–0.23 oz). The Costa Rica water snake has been documented being predated upon by Erythrolamprus bizona. Other potential predators of the genus include turtles, birds, and other snakes such as Micrurus species.
