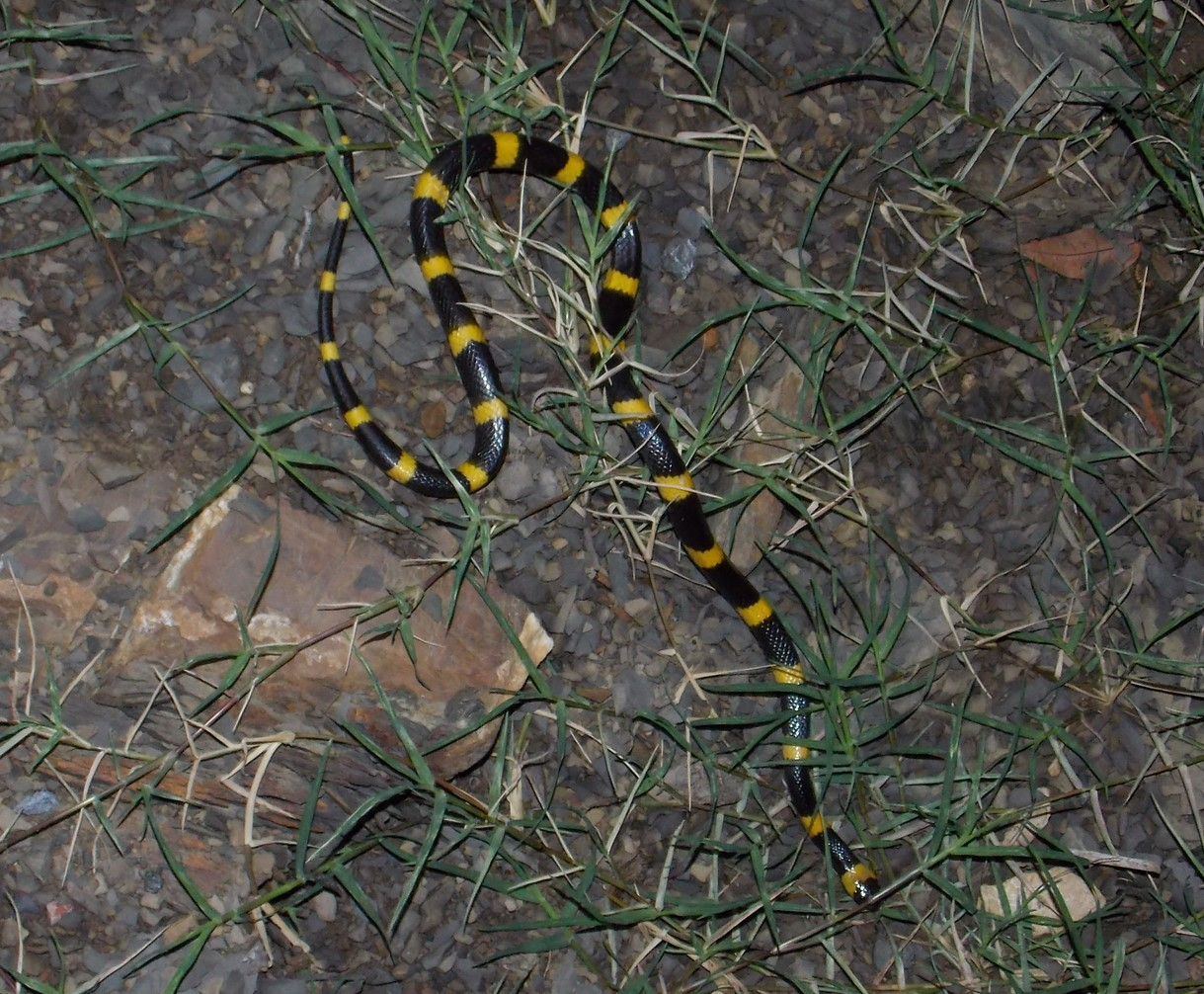

Conservation status
- Least Concern (IUCN 3.1)

Scientific classification
- Kingdom: Animalia
- Phylum: Chordata
- Class: Reptilia
- Order: Squamata
- Suborder: Serpentes
- Family: Colubridae
- Genus: Geophis
- Species: G. sartorii

Binomial name
- Geophis sartorii (Cope, 1863)

Synonyms
- Tropidodipsas sartorii Cope, 1863; Galedon annularis Jan, 1863; Leptognathus dumerilii Jan, 1863; Geophis annulatus W. Peters, 1870; Leptognathus sexcutatus Bocourt, 1884; Leptognathus leucostomus Bocourt, 1884; Leptognathus semicinctus Bocourt, 1884; Leptognathus (Tropidodipsas) bernoulii F. Müller, 1887; Leptognathus (Tropidodipsas) cuculliceps F. Müller, 1887; Sibon sartorii — Kofron, 1985; Geophis sartorii — C. Grünwald et al., 2021

= Geophis sartorii =

Species of snake

Geophis sartorii, also known commonly as Sartorius' snail-sucker and the terrestrial snail sucker, is a species of snake in the subfamily Dipsadinae of the family Colubridae. The species is native to southern North America and Central America. There are two recognized subspecies.

== Etymology ==
The specific name, sartorii, is in honor of German-born Mexican naturalist Christian Carl Wilhelm Sartorius.

The subspecific name, macdougalli, is in honor of naturalist Thomas Baillie MacDougall.

== Geographic range ==
G. sartorii is found in southeastern Mexico, and in Belize, Costa Rica, El Salvador, Guatemala, Honduras, and Nicaragua.

== Habitat ==
The preferred natural habitat of G. sartorii is forest, at altitudes from sea level to 2,000 m (6,600 ft).

== Description ==
G. sartorii may attain a snout-to-vent length of 48 cm (19 in) with a tail length of 14 cm (5.5 in). The body is black, with 16–20 narrow rings, which are yellowish to reddish in color.

== Diet ==
G. sartorii preys upon snails.

== Reproduction ==
G. sartorii is oviparous.

== Mimicry ==
G. sartorii mimicks Micrurus elegans, a species of venomous coral snake with which it is sympatric.

== Subspecies ==
Two subspecies are recognized as being valid, including the nominotypical subspecies.

- Geophis sartorius macdougalli (H.M. Smith, 1943)
- Geophis sartorii sartorii (Cope, 1863)

Nota bene: A trinomial authority in parentheses indicates that the subspecies was originally described in a genus other than Geophis.
