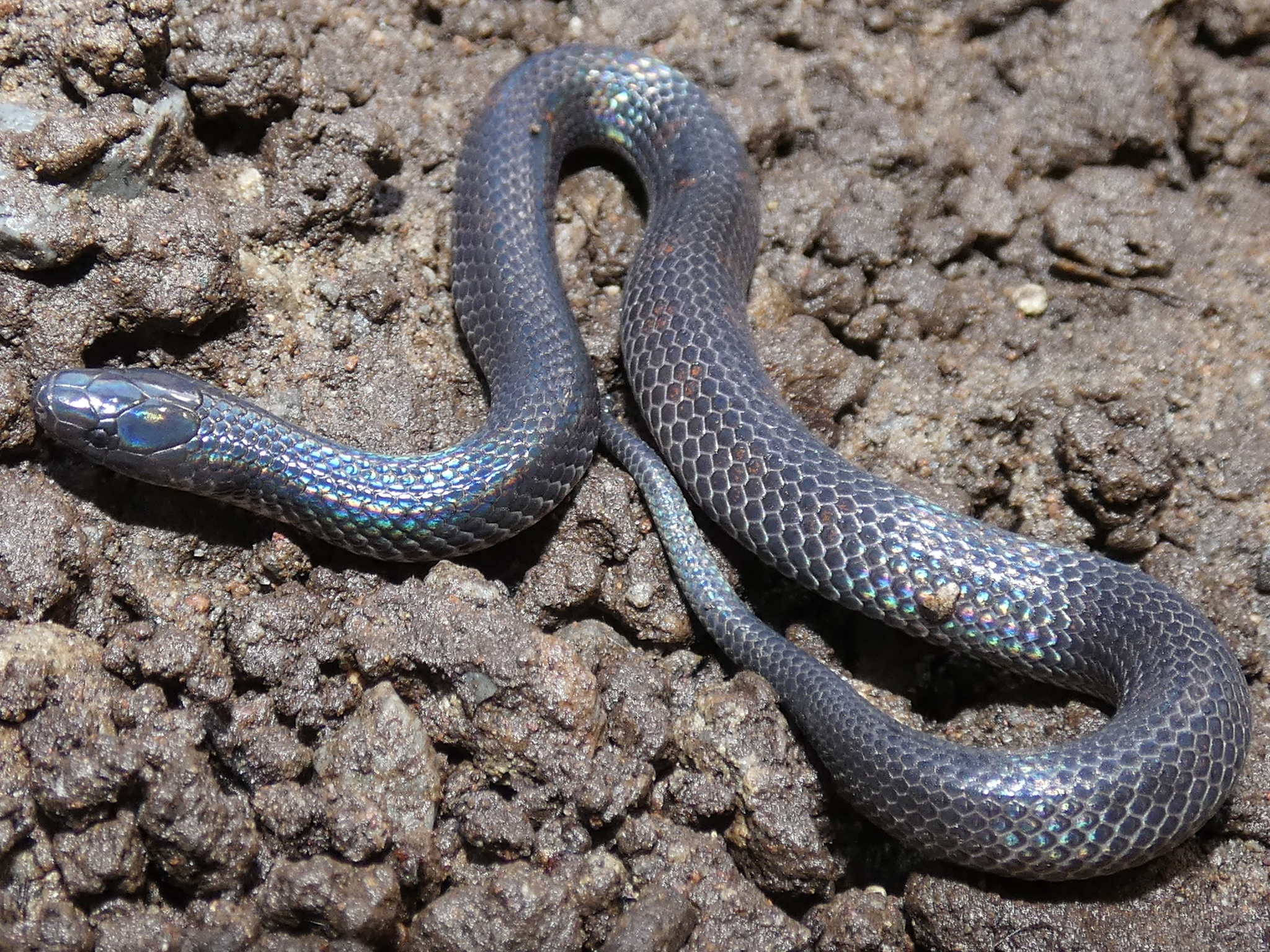

Conservation status
- Endangered (IUCN 3.1)

Scientific classification
- Kingdom: Animalia
- Phylum: Chordata
- Class: Reptilia
- Order: Squamata
- Suborder: Serpentes
- Family: Colubridae
- Genus: Geophis
- Species: G. talamancae

Binomial name
- Geophis talamancae Lips & Savage, 1994

= Geophis talamancae =

Species of snake

Geophis talamancae is a snake of the colubrid family. It is found in Costa Rica and Panama.
