= Geophis anocularis =

Conservation status
- Least Concern (IUCN 3.1)

Scientific classification
- Kingdom: Animalia
- Phylum: Chordata
- Class: Reptilia
- Order: Squamata
- Suborder: Serpentes
- Family: Colubridae
- Genus: Geophis
- Species: G. anocularis

Binomial name
- Geophis anocularis Dunn, 1920

Species of snake

Geophis anocularis, also known as the Sierra Mije earth snake, is a snake of the colubrid family. It is endemic to Mexico.
