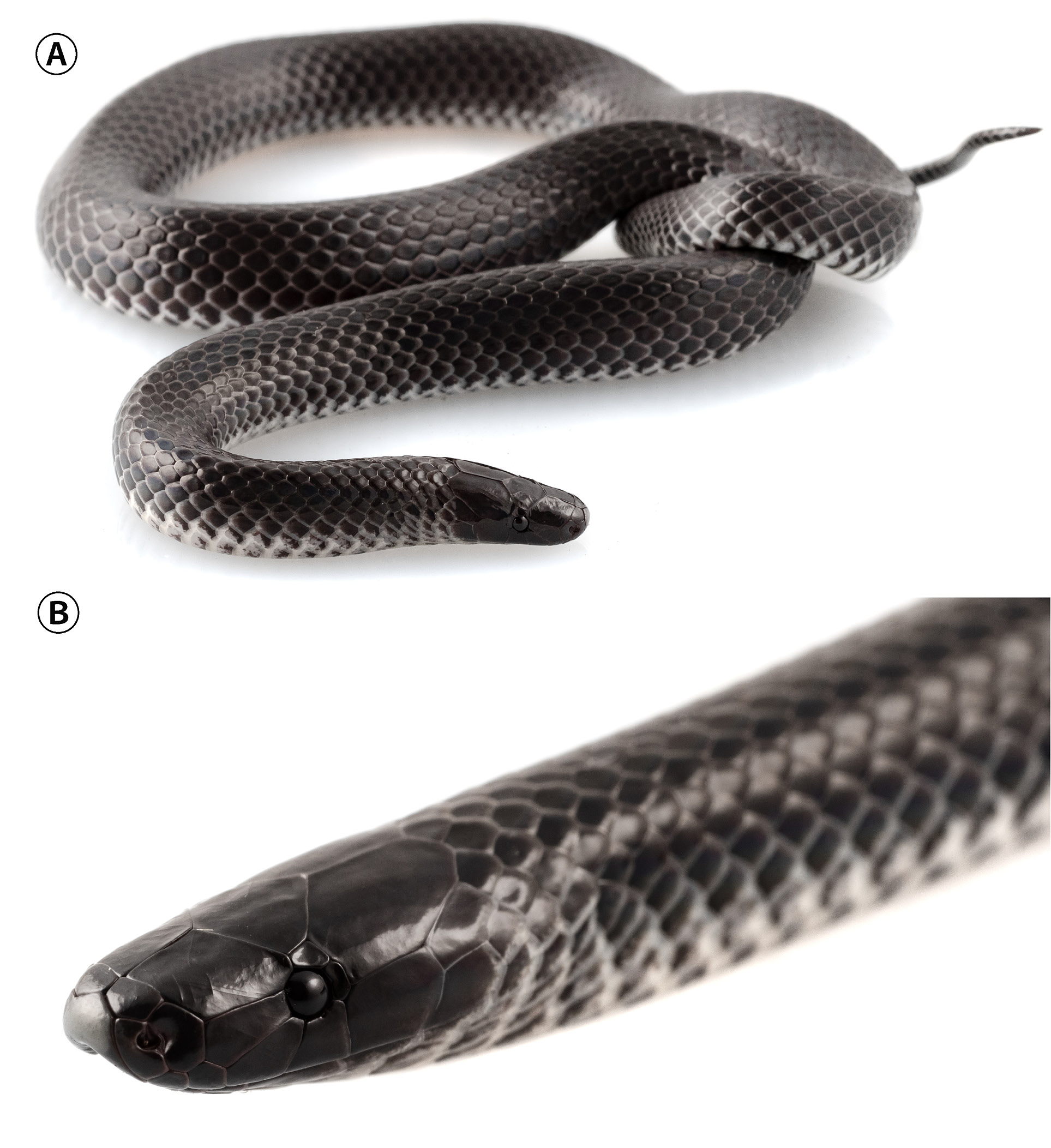
- Dorsal (A) and cephalic scales view (B)

Conservation status
- Near Threatened (IUCN 3.1)

Scientific classification
- Kingdom: Animalia
- Phylum: Chordata
- Class: Reptilia
- Order: Squamata
- Suborder: Serpentes
- Family: Colubridae
- Genus: Geophis
- Species: G. nigroalbus

Binomial name
- Geophis nigroalbus Boulenger, 1908

Synonyms
- Geophis nigro-albus Boulenger, 1908; Catastoma nigroalbum — Amaral, 1929; Geophis brachycephalus — Downs, 1967

= Geophis nigroalbus =

Species of snake

Geophis nigroalbus is a species of colubrid snake in the subfamily Dipsadinae. It is endemic to the Andes of Colombia. It is sometimes known as the goo-eater snake or Colombian earth snake.

== Distribution ==
Geophis nigroalbus is known a few localities in the Cordillera Occidental, and it has recently also been discovered in the Magdalena Valley, on the western slopes of Cordillera Oriental.

== Description ==
Geophis nigroalbus is a small species. An adult male specimen from the Magdalena Valley measures 309 mm (12 in) in snout–vent length and has 65 mm (2.6 in) tail. The upper surfaces of body and tail are uniform black. The venter is cream with black spots while the underside of the tail is black with a few cream patches. There are 134–149 ventral scales in males and 141–157 in females, 42–51 subcaudal scales in males and 37–46 in females, and in total 180–197 segmentals in males and 181–203 in females.

== Habitat and conservation ==
Geophis nigroalbus is a fossorial species that occurs in tropical premontane wet forest at elevations of 1,037–1,680 m (3,402–5,512 ft) above sea level. The specimen from the Magdalena Valley was found actively foraging during the night in the leaf litter of a regenerative tropical rain forest after a strong rainfall of about one-hour duration.

Geophis nigroalbus is a rare species and most collections consist of single specimens. Loss and degradation of the forest habitat is a threat to this species.
