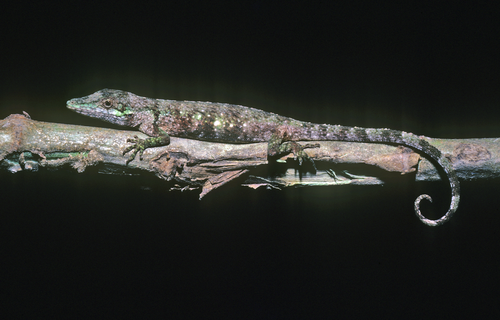

Conservation status
- Least Concern (IUCN 3.1)

Scientific classification
- Kingdom: Animalia
- Phylum: Chordata
- Class: Reptilia
- Order: Squamata
- Suborder: Iguania
- Family: Dactyloidae
- Genus: Anolis
- Species: A. nicefori

Binomial name
- Anolis nicefori (Dunn, 1944)

Synonyms
- Phenacosaurus nicefori Dunn, 1944; Dactyloa nicefori (Dunn, 1944)

= Anolis nicefori =

Species of lizard

19

Anolis nicefori, also known commonly as Niceforo's Andes anole, is a species of lizard in the family Dactyloidae. The species is native to northwestern South America.

== Etymology ==
The specific name, nicefori, is in honor of missionary Brother Nicéforo María, born Antoine Rouhaire in France, who established a natural history museum in Medellín, Colombia.

== Geographic distribution ==
Anolis nicefori is found in Colombia and Venezuela.

== Habitat ==
The preferred natural habitat of Anolis nicefori is forest, at elevations of 2,000–2,600 m (6,560–8,530 ft), but it has also been found in disturbed habitats such as pasture.

== Reproduction ==
Anolis nicefori is oviparous.
