= Geophis immaculatus =

Conservation status
- Least Concern (IUCN 3.1)

Scientific classification
- Kingdom: Animalia
- Phylum: Chordata
- Class: Reptilia
- Order: Squamata
- Suborder: Serpentes
- Family: Colubridae
- Genus: Geophis
- Species: G. immaculatus

Binomial name
- Geophis immaculatus Downs, 1967

Species of snake

Geophis immaculatus, Downs's earth snake, is a small snake of the colubrid family. It is native to Mexico and Guatemala. There are no recognized subspecies. Although not much has been documented about it, the population distribution is in abundance and is of least concern in terms of conservation status.

G. immaculatus is most closely related to the Geophis fulvoguttatus, a snake found exclusively in the Metapan mountains of El Salvador. The Geophis fulvoguttatus is characterised by more ventral scales and lateral reddish spots, which the G. immaculatus lacks. The two species are part of a group known as Geophis Dubius that includes 11 other snake species of Central America, as categorised by Floyd Leslie Downs.

== Habitat ==
Geophis immaculatus is found in wet forests and cloud forests. Occasionally, it is observed in disturbed areas such as plantations. El Triunfo and Tacana Biosphere Reserve in Mexico are two places where it is known to inhabit.
