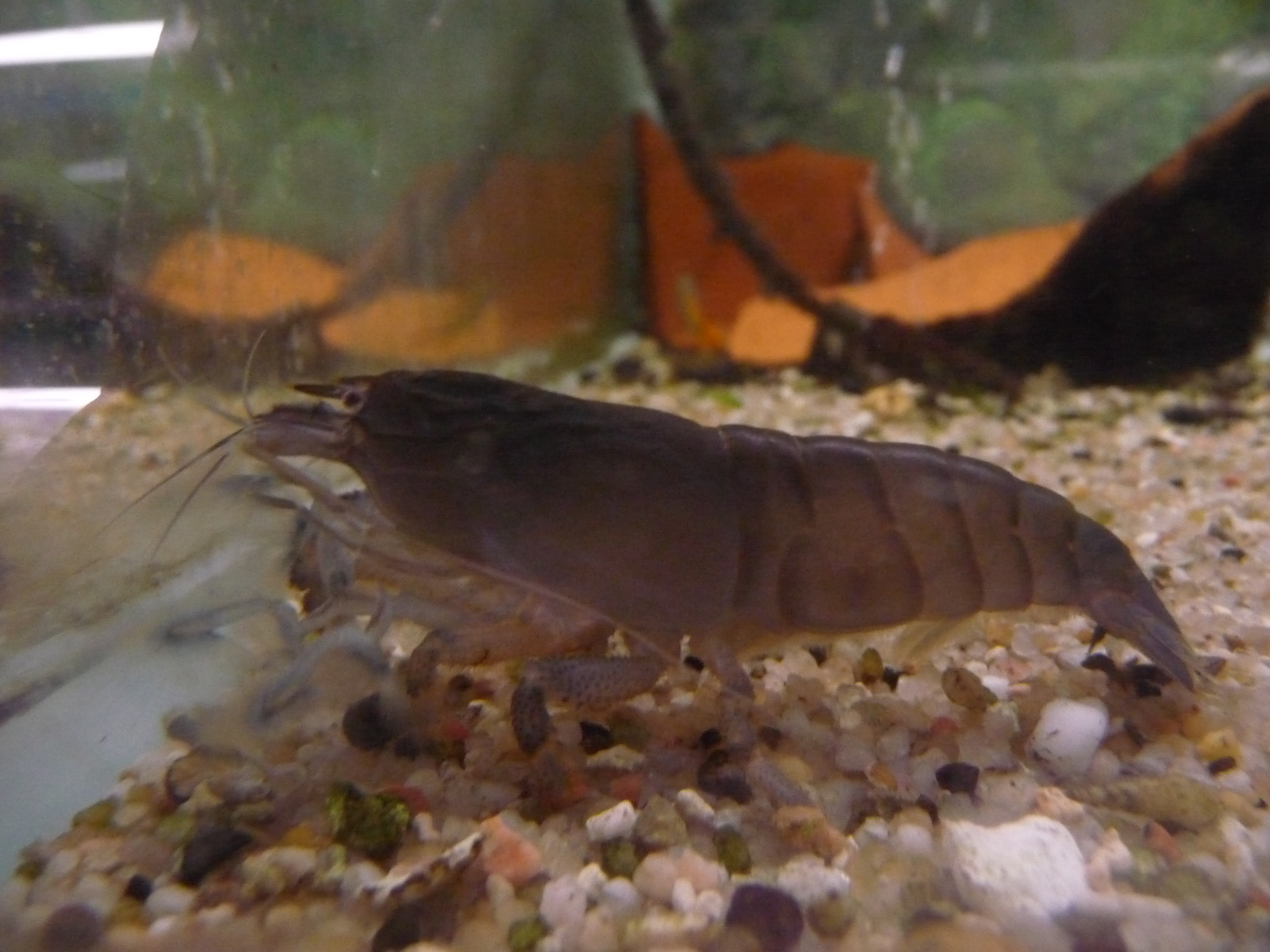

Conservation status
- Least Concern (IUCN 3.1)

Scientific classification
- Kingdom: Animalia
- Phylum: Arthropoda
- Class: Malacostraca
- Order: Decapoda
- Suborder: Pleocyemata
- Infraorder: Caridea
- Family: Atyidae
- Genus: Atya
- Species: A. gabonensis

Binomial name
- Atya gabonensis Giebel, 1875

Synonyms
- Atya sculptata Ortmann, 1890; Euatya sculptilis Koelbel, 1884

= Atya gabonensis =

Species of crustacean

Atya gabonensis is a species of freshwater shrimp from West Africa. Note that accounts of its occurrence in South America are erroneous, and likely another species (Atya scabra). It is an omnivorous filter feeder that uses feather-like claspers to filter particles from the water. It can grow to 15 centimetres (6 inches). It has many common names, including African fan shrimp, African filter shrimp, African giant shrimp, vampire shrimp, blue rhino shrimp, Gabon shrimp, and Cameroon fan shrimp.

== Distribution ==
Atya gabonensis is found in West Africa, from Senegal to the Democratic Republic of the Congo. Accounts of it being found in South America from Venezuela to Brazil are a case of mistaken identity.

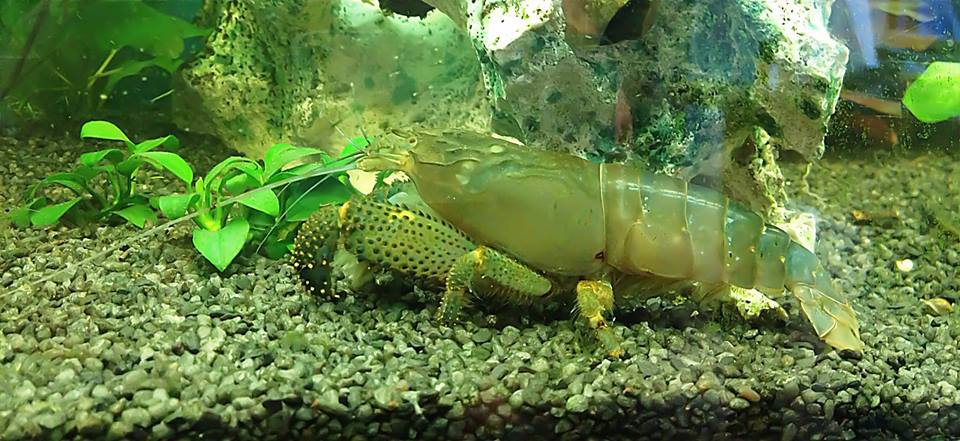
In captivity

== In aquaria ==
Despite their predatory-sounding name "Vampire", they are a non-aggressive species that does well in community tanks that have areas to hide during the molting process. Another requirement is a moderate to strong current where the shrimp can sit and catch food. Either a very well established tank with sufficient plankton, or supplemental feedings of finely ground fish food, spirulina powder, etc. preferably spot-fed. If they begin patrolling the bottom and sifting sand, this is a sign they are not getting enough to eat from filter-feeding and are in danger of starving. A pH of 6.5–7.8 is acceptable as well as temperatures of 23–29 °C (74–84 °F). As with most invertebrates they are very susceptible to medications used to treat many fish diseases, with copper being deadly. Also ammonia and nitrite poisoning are possible.

Colouring of this species can vary from a creamy white to an almost rusty brown, and also a deep blue. It is believed that the water conditions will affect colouring and harder water causes the blue morph. These shrimp have been known to change colour several times in the same year.
