= Geophis ruthveni =

Conservation status
- Least Concern (IUCN 3.1)

Scientific classification
- Kingdom: Animalia
- Phylum: Chordata
- Class: Reptilia
- Order: Squamata
- Suborder: Serpentes
- Family: Colubridae
- Genus: Geophis
- Species: G. ruthveni

Binomial name
- Geophis ruthveni Werner, 1925

Species of snake

Geophis ruthveni, also known as the Stripe-bellied earth snake or Ruthven's earth snake, is a snake of the colubrid family. It is found in Costa Rica.

== Description ==
Geophis ruthveni is a small snake, length 31 cm (12.2 in) or less, with a bullet-shaped head not larger than its neck, slender body, tiny dark eyes, and short tail. Its body and tail are uniformly-colored, glossy black with iridescence, and its head may be dark brown. It is nearly identical to the more common Geophis hoffmani, though G. ruthveni can be differentiated with its dark-edged ventral scales and keeled scales on the tail.

== Habitat ==
G. ruthveni is endemic to Costa Rica, where it can be found in the lowlands and foothill rainforests of the Arenal region, the Atlantic lowlands, and in the Peñas Blancas Valley. It is a fossorial snake, living under rocks, logs, or other surface debris.

== Diet ==
Like other species in genus Geophis, it feeds on worms and other soft-bodied invertebrates, as well as their larvae and eggs.
