= Geophis championi =

Conservation status
- Data Deficient (IUCN 3.1)

Scientific classification
- Kingdom: Animalia
- Phylum: Chordata
- Class: Reptilia
- Order: Squamata
- Suborder: Serpentes
- Family: Colubridae
- Genus: Geophis
- Species: G. championi

Binomial name
- Geophis championi Boulenger, 1894

Synonyms
- Geophis championi Boulenger, 1894; Catastoma championi — Amaral, 1929; Geophis brachycephalus — Dunn, 1942; Geophis championi — Downs, 1967

Species of snake

Geophis championi, the Panamenian earth snake, is a species of snake in the family Colubridae. The species is endemic to Panama.

== Etymology ==
The specific name, championi, is in honor of English entomologist George Charles Champion.

== Habitat ==
The preferred natural habitat of G. championi is forest, at an altitude of 1,370 m (4,490 ft).

== Description ==
The holotype of G. championi, a male, has a snout-to-vent length (SVL) of 21 cm (8.3 in), with a tail 4 cm (1.6 in) long. Dorsally, it is uniformly iridescent black. The ventrals and the subcaudals are whitish, edged with black.

== Reproduction ==
G. championi is oviparous.
