= Geophis downsi =

Conservation status
- Data Deficient (IUCN 3.1)

Scientific classification
- Kingdom: Animalia
- Phylum: Chordata
- Class: Reptilia
- Order: Squamata
- Suborder: Serpentes
- Family: Colubridae
- Genus: Geophis
- Species: G. downsi

Binomial name
- Geophis downsi Savage, 1981

Species of snake

Geophis downsi, also known as the Savage's earth snake, is a snake of the colubrid family. It is endemic to Costa Rica and only known from its type locality, Las Cruces Biological Station in the Puntarenas Province. It is named after Floyd Leslie Downs.

Only one specimen collected from under leaf litter in premontane rainforest is known. No further specimens were found during a study on leaf-litter fauna of the area in 2010–2012. There are no known threats to this species that was found in a private reserve.
