= Geophis petersii =

Conservation status
- Data Deficient (IUCN 3.1)

Scientific classification
- Kingdom: Animalia
- Phylum: Chordata
- Class: Reptilia
- Order: Squamata
- Suborder: Serpentes
- Family: Colubridae
- Genus: Geophis
- Species: G. petersii

Binomial name
- Geophis petersii Boulenger, 1894

Synonyms
- Geophis petersi Boulenger, 1894; Catastoma petersii (Boulenger, 1894)

Species of snake

Geophis petersii, also known commonly as Peters' earth snake and minadora de Peters in Mexican Spanish, is a species of snake in the subfamily Dipsadinae of the family Colubridae. The species is endemic to Mexico.

== Etymology ==
The specific name, petersii, is in honor of German herpetologist Wilhelm Peters.

== Description ==
Geophis petersi can be distinguished from other species of its genus by the following combination of characters. The dorsal scales are arranged in 15 rows at midbody, and are smooth except above the cloacal region, where they are faintly keeled. The sum of the ventrals and subcaudals is greater than 175. There are six upper labials. The length of the loreal scale is approximately equal to the length of the nasal scales. The body is dark above, and light below.

Peters' earth snake may attain a total length of about 20 cm (7.9 in), which includes a tail length of about 3 cm (1.2 in). Dorsally, it is brownish. It is darker on the middorsal portion of the head and body, and is paler yellowish brown laterally. Ventrally, it is whitish. There may be some faint brown mottling on the chin, but the rest of the venter is immacculate.

== Geographic distribution ==
Geophis petersii is found in central Mexico, in the Mexican states of Guanajuato, Guerrero, Jalisco, Michoacán, and México.

== Habitat ==
The preferred natural habitat of Geophis petersii is forest, at elevations of 1,800–2,000 m (5,900–6,600 ft).

== Behavior ==
Geophis petersii is terrestrial and fossorial.

== Reproduction ==
Geophis petersii is oviparous.
