= Geophis bellus =

Conservation status
- Data Deficient (IUCN 3.1)

Scientific classification
- Kingdom: Animalia
- Phylum: Chordata
- Class: Reptilia
- Order: Squamata
- Suborder: Serpentes
- Family: Colubridae
- Genus: Geophis
- Species: G. bellus

Binomial name
- Geophis bellus Myers, 2003

Species of snake

Geophis bellus is a snake of the colubrid family. It is endemic to Panama.
