= Geophis chalybeus =

Conservation status
- Data Deficient (IUCN 3.1)

Scientific classification
- Kingdom: Animalia
- Phylum: Chordata
- Class: Reptilia
- Order: Squamata
- Suborder: Serpentes
- Family: Colubridae
- Genus: Geophis
- Species: G. chalybeus

Binomial name
- Geophis chalybeus (Wagler, 1830)

Species of snake

Geophis chalybeus, also known as the Veracruz earth snake, is a snake of the colubrid family. It is endemic to Mexico.
