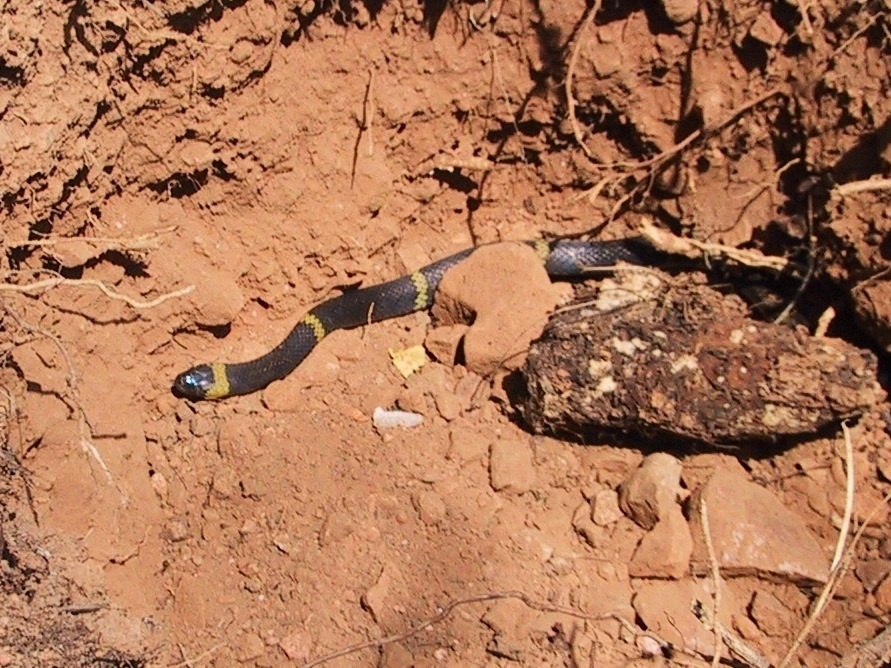

Conservation status
- Least Concern (IUCN 3.1)

Scientific classification
- Kingdom: Animalia
- Phylum: Chordata
- Class: Reptilia
- Order: Squamata
- Suborder: Serpentes
- Family: Colubridae
- Genus: Geophis
- Species: G. annuliferus

Binomial name
- Geophis annuliferus (Boulenger, 1894)

= Geophis annuliferus =

Species of snake

Geophis annuliferus, also known as the western snail-eating snake, is a snake of the colubrid family. It is endemic to Mexico.
