= Geophis occabus =

Scientific classification
- Kingdom: Animalia
- Phylum: Chordata
- Class: Reptilia
- Order: Squamata
- Suborder: Serpentes
- Family: Colubridae
- Genus: Geophis
- Species: G. occabus

Binomial name
- Geophis occabus Pavón-Vázquez, García-Vázquez, Blancas-Hernández & Nieto-Montes de Oca, 2011

Species of snake

Geophis occabus is a snake of the colubrid family endemic to Mexico.
