= Anolis dunni =

Conservation status
- Least Concern (IUCN 3.1)

Scientific classification
- Kingdom: Animalia
- Phylum: Chordata
- Class: Reptilia
- Order: Squamata
- Suborder: Iguania
- Family: Dactyloidae
- Genus: Anolis
- Species: A. dunni

Binomial name
- Anolis dunni H.M. Smith, 1936

Synonyms
- Norops dunni (H.M. Smith, 1936)

Species of lizard

Anolis dunni, also known commonly as Dunn's anole and abaniquillo de Dunn in Mexican Spanish, is a species of lizard in the family Dactyloidae. The species is native to southern Mexico.

== Etymology ==
The specific name, dunni, is in honor of American herpetologist Emmett Reid Dunn.

== Geographic range ==
A. dunni is found in the Mexican states of Guerrero and Michoacán.

== Habitat ==
The preferred natural habitat of A. dunni is dry forest in the Pacific coastal foothills, at altitudes below 1,200 m (3,940 ft).

== Description ==
The species A. dunni is moderate-sized for its genus. Females may attain a snout-to-vent length (SVL) of 5 cm (2.0 in). Males are larger, up to 5.85 cm (2.30 in). The dewlap of males is bright reddish orange, with small whitish dash-shaped markings.

== Behavior ==
A. dunni is diurnal and arboreal.

== Reproduction ==
A. dunni is oviparous.
