= Lenomyrmex inusitatus =

Scientific classification
- Domain: Eukaryota
- Kingdom: Animalia
- Phylum: Arthropoda
- Class: Insecta
- Order: Hymenoptera
- Family: Formicidae
- Subfamily: Myrmicinae
- Genus: Lenomyrmex
- Species: L. inusitatus

Binomial name
- Lenomyrmex inusitatus (Fernández, 2001)

Species of ant

Lenomyrmex inusitatus is a Neotropical species of ant in the subfamily Myrmicinae. The worker of Lenomyrmex inusitatus is distinguished from other Lenomyrmex workers by smooth and shiny mesosoma with well-developed propodeal spines and by the foveolate-striate sculpture covering all the dorsal surface of its head. L. inusitatus has an unusual distribution since it is the single Lenomyrmex species recorded east of the Andes.
