= Geophis rostralis =

Scientific classification
- Kingdom: Animalia
- Phylum: Chordata
- Class: Reptilia
- Order: Squamata
- Suborder: Serpentes
- Family: Colubridae
- Genus: Geophis
- Species: G. rostralis

Binomial name
- Geophis rostralis (Jan, 1865)

Species of snake

Geophis rostralis, also known as the Sierra Madre earth snake, is a snake of the colubrid family. It is found in Mexico.
