= Geophis tectus =

Conservation status
- Least Concern (IUCN 3.1)

Scientific classification
- Kingdom: Animalia
- Phylum: Chordata
- Class: Reptilia
- Order: Squamata
- Suborder: Serpentes
- Family: Colubridae
- Genus: Geophis
- Species: G. tectus

Binomial name
- Geophis tectus Savage & J.I. Watling, 2008

Species of snake

Geophis tectus is a snake of the colubrid family. It is found in Panama.
