= Hydromorphus dunni =

Conservation status
- Data Deficient (IUCN 3.1)

Scientific classification
- Kingdom: Animalia
- Phylum: Chordata
- Class: Reptilia
- Order: Squamata
- Suborder: Serpentes
- Family: Colubridae
- Genus: Hydromorphus
- Species: H. dunni

Binomial name
- Hydromorphus dunni Slevin, 1942

Species of snake

Hydromorphus dunni, also known as Dunn's water snake, is a snake of the colubrid family. It is moderately-sized, reaching lengths of 482 millimetres (19 in), and has an olive-brown upperside, yellowish venter, and a gray underside to the tail. It is endemic to Panama, where it has a range stretching from Chiriquí east to the provinces of Colón and Panamá Oeste. It inhabits freshwater rainforest streams in dense lowland and premontane rainforests. It was long known from only its type locality near Boquete in Chiriquí and was not documented again for over 70 years before being a study found it to occur across much of the country in 2026.

== Taxonomy ==
Hydromorphus dunni was formally described in 1942 based on a specimen collected from near Boquete in the Panamanian province of Chiriquí. The specific name, dunni, is in honor of American herpetologist Emmett Reid Dunn. It has the common name Dunn's water snake.

== Description ==
Dunn's water snake is moderately-sized, reaching lengths of 482 millimetres (19 in). The species has an olive-brown upperside, yellowish venter with gray smudging on the margins of the ventral scales, and a gray underside to the tail. It is characterised by having two internasal scales, one loreal scale that is distinct from the eye, an elongated preocular scale that touches the supraocular and the third supralabial scales, and one to three prefrontal scales.

== Distribution and ecology ==
Dunn's water snake is endemic to Panama. It was long known only from a single specimen collected at the type locality of Boquete in Chiriquí. However, a 2026 study found that the species was much more widespread in the country than previously known, with a range stretching from Chiriquí east to the provinces of Colón and Panamá Oeste. The species has been documented from Río Macho de Monte in the highlands of Chiriquí, Santa Fe National Park in Veraguas, Cerro Turega in Coclé, Donoso in Colón, and Altos de Campana National Park in Panamá Oeste. This range largely follows the central mountains of western Panama.

Dunn's water snake, as the name suggests, is largely an inhabitant of freshwater rainforest streams. It is found in dense lowland and premontane rainforests, and is not thought to adjust well to disturbed habitats. It is mainly a nocturnal species and may feed on soft-bodied creatures, although its diet is poorly known. It reproduces by laying eggs, but details on the number and incubation period of its eggs is not known. Although no predation events have been documented in this species, it may be predated upon by turtles, birds, and other snakes, such as Micrurus species.

== Conservation ==
Dunn's water snake was classified as being data deficient on the global IUCN Red List and critically endangered on the Panamanian Red List as of 2026, although these classifications were given prior to its rediscovery due to the over 70 years it had not been seen. The scientists who rediscovered the snake recommended that it be classified as vulnerable on both the global and national lists due to its specific habitat requirements and ongoing habitat degradation in its range.
