= Geophis semidoliatus =

Conservation status
- Least Concern (IUCN 3.1)

Scientific classification
- Kingdom: Animalia
- Phylum: Chordata
- Class: Reptilia
- Order: Squamata
- Suborder: Serpentes
- Family: Colubridae
- Genus: Geophis
- Species: G. semidoliatus

Binomial name
- Geophis semidoliatus Duméril, Bibron, & Duméril, 1854)

Species of snake

Geophis semidoliatus, also known as the coral earth snake, is a snake of the colubrid family. It is found in Mexico.
