= Geophis nigrocinctus =

Conservation status
- Data Deficient (IUCN 3.1)

Scientific classification
- Kingdom: Animalia
- Phylum: Chordata
- Class: Reptilia
- Order: Squamata
- Suborder: Serpentes
- Family: Colubridae
- Genus: Geophis
- Species: G. nigrocinctus

Binomial name
- Geophis nigrocinctus Duellman, 1959

Species of snake

Geophis nigrocinctus, also known as the black-banded earth snake, is a snake of the colubrid family. It is found in Mexico.
