= Geophis cansecoi =

Scientific classification
- Kingdom: Animalia
- Phylum: Chordata
- Class: Reptilia
- Order: Squamata
- Suborder: Serpentes
- Family: Colubridae
- Genus: Geophis
- Species: G. cansecoi

Binomial name
- Geophis cansecoi C. Grünwald, Ahumada-Carrillo, A. Grünwald, Montaño-Ruvalcaba & García-Vázquez, 2021

Species of snake

Geophis cansecoi is a snake of the colubrid family. It is endemic to Mexico.
