= Geophis omiltemanus =

Conservation status
- Least Concern (IUCN 3.1)

Scientific classification
- Kingdom: Animalia
- Phylum: Chordata
- Class: Reptilia
- Order: Squamata
- Suborder: Serpentes
- Family: Colubridae
- Genus: Geophis
- Species: G. omiltemanus

Binomial name
- Geophis omiltemanus Günther, 1893

Species of snake

Geophis omiltemanus, also known as the Guerreran earth snake, is a snake of the colubrid family. It is endemic to Mexico.
