= Geophis godmani =

Conservation status
- Least Concern (IUCN 3.1)

Scientific classification
- Kingdom: Animalia
- Phylum: Chordata
- Class: Reptilia
- Order: Squamata
- Suborder: Serpentes
- Family: Colubridae
- Genus: Geophis
- Species: G. godmani

Binomial name
- Geophis godmani Boulenger, 1894

Synonyms
- Geophis godmani Boulenger 1894; Catastoma godmani — Amaral, 1929; Geophis dolichocephalus — Taylor, 1954; Geophis godmani — J. Peters & Orejas-Miranda, 1970

Species of snake

Geophis godmani, also known commonly as Godman's earth snake, the yellow-bellied earth snake, and la culebra minadora de Godman in American Spanish, is a species of snake in the Family Colubridae. The species is native to Central America.

== Etymology ==
The specific name, godmani, is in honor of British naturalist Frederick DuCane Godman.

== Geographic range ==
G. godmani is found in Costa Rica and Panama.

== Habitat ==
The preferred natural habitat of G. godmani is forest, at altitudes of 1,100–2,100 m (3,600–6,900 ft), but is also found in forest clearings used as pasture.

== Description ==
G. godmani is brownish black dorsally, and yellow ventrally. It may attain a total length of 40 cm (16 in), which includes a tail 5.5 cm (2.2 in) long. Its dorsal scales are completely smooth, and they are arranged in 15 rows at midbody.

== Behavior ==
G. godmani is terrestrial and secretive, hiding under rocks and logs.

== Reproduction ==
G. godmani is oviparous.
