= Geophis betaniensis =

Conservation status
- Data Deficient (IUCN 3.1)

Scientific classification
- Kingdom: Animalia
- Phylum: Chordata
- Class: Reptilia
- Order: Squamata
- Suborder: Serpentes
- Family: Colubridae
- Genus: Geophis
- Species: G. betaniensis

Binomial name
- Geophis betaniensis J.H. Restrepo & J.W. Wright, 1987

Species of snake

Geophis betaniensis, the Betanien earth snake, is a snake of the colubrid family. It is endemic to Colombia.
