= Geophis duellmani =

Conservation status
- Least Concern (IUCN 3.1)

Scientific classification
- Kingdom: Animalia
- Phylum: Chordata
- Class: Reptilia
- Order: Squamata
- Suborder: Serpentes
- Family: Colubridae
- Genus: Geophis
- Species: G. duellmani

Binomial name
- Geophis duellmani H.M. Smith & Holland, 1969

Species of snake

Geophis duellmani, also known as the Sierra Juarez earth snake, is a snake of the colubrid family. It is endemic to Mexico.
