= Geophis juarezi =

Conservation status
- Data Deficient (IUCN 3.1)

Scientific classification
- Kingdom: Animalia
- Phylum: Chordata
- Class: Reptilia
- Order: Squamata
- Suborder: Serpentes
- Family: Colubridae
- Genus: Geophis
- Species: G. juarezi

Binomial name
- Geophis juarezi Nieto-Montes de Oca, 2003

Species of snake

Geophis juarezi, also known commonly as Benito Juarez's earth snake and la minadora de Benito Juárez in Mexican Spanish, is a species of snake of in the subfamily Dipsadinae of the family Colubridae. The species is native to Mexico.

== Etymology ==
The specific name, juarezi, is in honor of Benito Juárez who was a president of Mexico.

== Geographic range ==
G. juarezi is endemic to the Mexican state of Oaxaca.

== Habitat ==
The preferred natural habitat of G. juarezi is forest, at altitudes around 800 m (2,600 ft).

== Description ==
G. juarezi is uniformly dark grayish brown dorsally. The dorsal scales are arranged in 17 rows. On the posterior portion of the body, the dorsal scales are strongly keeled and have paired apical pits. The ventrals number 114 in the only known male, and 118–124 in the three known females. The subcaudals number 55 in the male, and 49 in the only known female with a complete tail.

== Behavior ==
G. juarezi is terrestrial.

== Reproduction ==
G. juarezi is oviparous.
