= Geophis laticinctus =

Conservation status
- Least Concern (IUCN 3.1)

Scientific classification
- Kingdom: Animalia
- Phylum: Chordata
- Class: Reptilia
- Order: Squamata
- Suborder: Serpentes
- Family: Colubridae
- Genus: Geophis
- Species: G. laticinctus

Binomial name
- Geophis laticinctus H.M. Smith & K.L. Williams, 1963

Species of snake

Geophis laticinctus, also known as the Mesa Central earth snake, is a snake of the colubrid family. It is found in Mexico.
