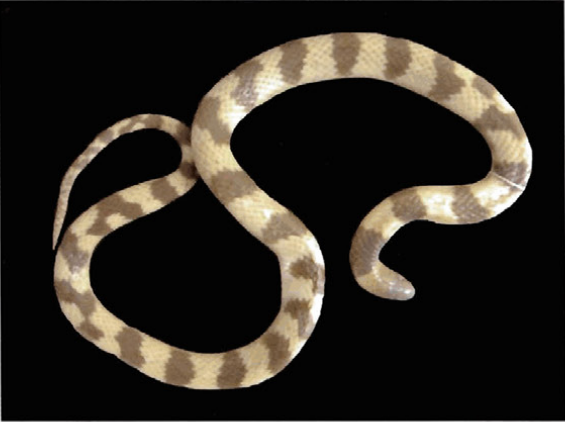
- The only known specimen of Geophis dunni

Conservation status
- Data Deficient (IUCN 3.1)

Scientific classification
- Kingdom: Animalia
- Phylum: Chordata
- Class: Reptilia
- Order: Squamata
- Suborder: Serpentes
- Family: Colubridae
- Genus: Geophis
- Species: G. dunni

Binomial name
- Geophis dunni Schmidt, 1932

= Geophis dunni =

Species of snake

Geophis dunni, Dunn's earth snake, is a species of enigmatic snake in the family Colubridae. The species is presumably endemic to Nicaragua and is only known from a single specimen discovered in 1932. This specimen, the holotype, was discovered by Karl Patterson Schmidt in the stomach of a Central American coral snake, and no additional specimen has been seen since. The holotype has a snout-to-vent length (SVL) of 310 mm (12 in), a tail length of 57 mm (2.2 in), and a total length of 367 mm (14.4 in). It is part of the Geophis sieboldi species group according to Floyd Leslie Downs. This species was named by Schmidt after fellow herpetologist Emmett Reid Dunn "in allusion to his important contributions to our knowledge of this group of snakes".

This species is little known for several reasons. Snakes of the genus Geophis are fossorial and nocturnal, and as such are rarely observed in their natural habitat even by those actively searching for them. Also, the snakes of this genus form extensive species complexes in which the only way to tell them apart is by slight differences. For example, Geophis dunni differs from other species by having 17 dorsal scale rows, 8 infralabial scales, and 140 ventral scales. Additionally, the type locality given by Schmidt is very vague, only being "Matagalpa, Nicaragua". Matagalpa is both a city and a municipality, and no data for elevation or habitat type were specified either. However, Downs would mark a location in north Nicaragua at an elevation of 705 m (2,313 ft) as being the type locality of this snake, but this location is exactly the city of Matagalpa and has been questioned by other papers on its accuracy. As of 2022, Geophis dunni remains "data deficient" until another individual is collected and a habitat is identified.

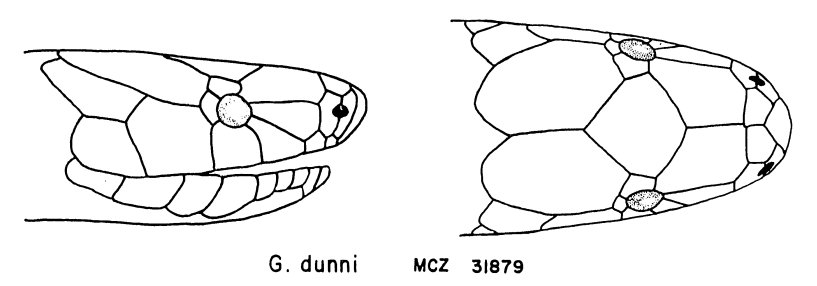
Geophis dunni drawn by Floyd Leslie Downs, 1967

== Reproduction ==
G. dunni is oviparous.
