= Geophis damiani =

Conservation status
- Critically Endangered (IUCN 3.1)

Scientific classification
- Kingdom: Animalia
- Phylum: Chordata
- Class: Reptilia
- Order: Squamata
- Suborder: Serpentes
- Family: Colubridae
- Genus: Geophis
- Species: G. damiani

Binomial name
- Geophis damiani Wilson, McCranie & K.L. Williams, 1998

Species of snake

Geophis damiani is a species of snake in the family Colubridae. The species is endemic to Yoro Department, Honduras, where it is only found in a small region of the forest.

== Etymology ==
The species G. damiani is named in honor of Damian Almendarez, a friend of the describers of the species.

== Habitat ==
The preferred natural habitat of G. damiani is forest (rain forest and cloud forest), at altitudes of 1,680–1,750 m (5,510–5,740 ft).

== Description ==
The dorsal scales of G. damiani are arranged in 15 rows throughout the length of its body. Other species of Geophis which occur in its geographic range have 17 dorsal scale rows.

== Behavior ==
G. damiani is terrestrial and fossorial.

== Reproduction ==
G. damiani is oviparous.
