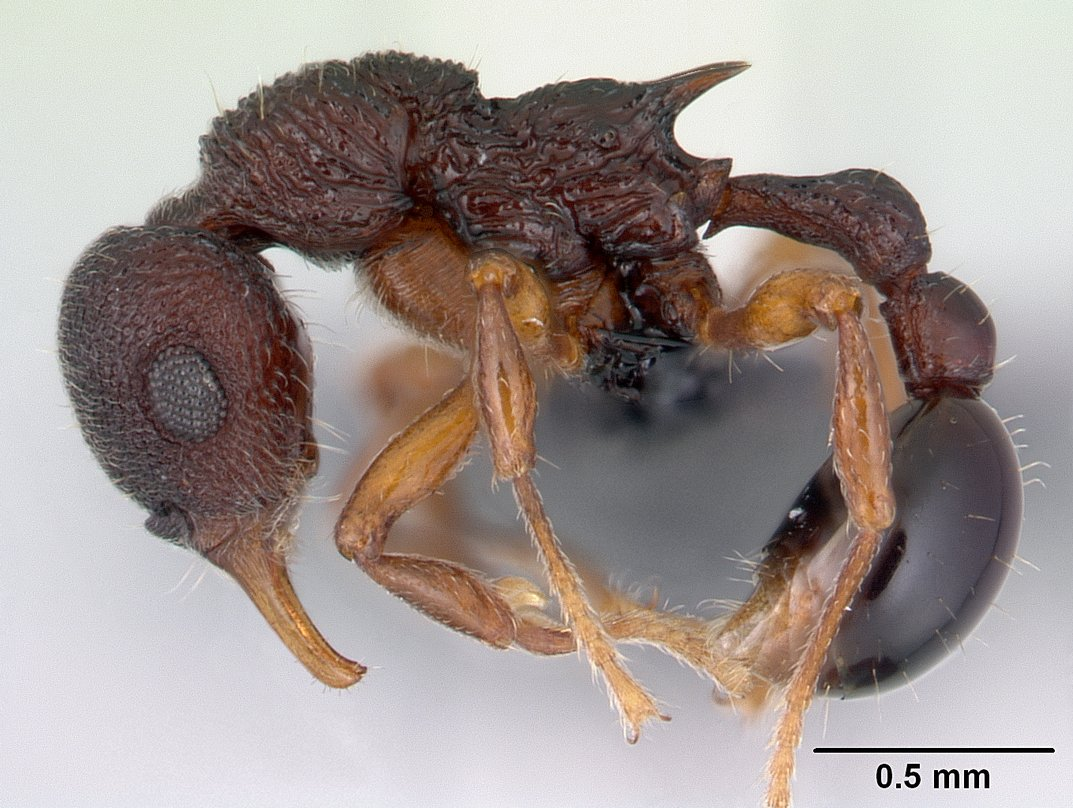
- L. colwelli worker from Costa Rica

Scientific classification
- Domain: Eukaryota
- Kingdom: Animalia
- Phylum: Arthropoda
- Class: Insecta
- Order: Hymenoptera
- Family: Formicidae
- Subfamily: Myrmicinae
- Tribe: Attini
- Genus: Lenomyrmex; Fernández & Palacio, 1999

Type species
- Lenomyrmex mandibularis Fernández & Palacio, 1999

Diversity
- 7 species

= Lenomyrmex =

Genus of ants

Lenomyrmex is a Neotropical genus of ant in the subfamily Myrmicinae.

== Species ==
- Lenomyrmex colwelli Longino, 2006
- Lenomyrmex costatus Fernández & Palacio, 1999
- Lenomyrmex foveolatus Fernández & Palacio, 1999
- Lenomyrmex hoelldobleri
- Lenomyrmex inusitatus (Fernández, 2001)
- Lenomyrmex mandibularis Fernández & Palacio, 1999
- Lenomyrmex wardi Fernández & Palacio, 1999

== Distribution ==
Lenomyrmex includes six rarely collected species from Costa Rica to Ecuador. Species have been collected from elevations close to sea level to 1800 m but seem to be mainly restricted to mid-elevations, that is, 1100–1500 m.

== Description ==
The genus is characterized by elongate mandibles bearing a series of minute peg-like denticles that arise behind the masticatory margin, by frontal lobes that are poorly expanded laterally, by large and deep antennal fossae, and by pedunculate petiole, with a poorly defined node. Among Lenomyrmex species, the queen caste has been described only for L. mandibularis, L. wardi and L. inusitatus.

== Taxonomy ==
The fact that Lenomyrmex possesses both primitive (e.g., promesonotal suture well developed) and derived (e.g., specialized morphology of the mandibles) characters makes ascertaining its correct phylogenetic position challenging. The genus was tentatively placed in its own tribe, Lenomyrmecini, but its position within the Myrmicinae remained to be determined. Preliminary results of a phylogenetic analysis indicated that Lenomyrmex fell within a clade of predominantly New World ants that includes the tribes Attini, Cephalotini, Dacetini, and the genus Pheidole. The genus was finally placed in Attini, when Ward et al. (2014) synonymized Lenomyrmecini under Attini.

== Biology ==
The unusual morphology of the mandibles suggests that Lenomyrmex is a specialist predator on an unknown prey. This habit is possibly linked to its apparent rarity and restricted elevational distribution. The degree of queen-worker dimorphism is weak, suggesting small colony sizes and absence of claustral independent colony foundation. In a study, a thorough inspection of the dead wood lying on the ground and of soil samples failed to uncover any nest of L. inusitatus. This and the fact that both workers and dealate queens have been extracted from the leaf litter (Winkler method) may indicate that this species nests and forages in the leaf litter.
