= Geophis zeledoni =

Conservation status
- Least Concern (IUCN 3.1)

Scientific classification
- Kingdom: Animalia
- Phylum: Chordata
- Class: Reptilia
- Order: Squamata
- Suborder: Serpentes
- Family: Colubridae
- Genus: Geophis
- Species: G. zeledoni

Binomial name
- Geophis zeledoni Taylor, 1954

Species of snake

Geophis zeledoni is a snake of the colubrid family. It is endemic to Costa Rica.
