= Geophis turbidus =

Scientific classification
- Kingdom: Animalia
- Phylum: Chordata
- Class: Reptilia
- Order: Squamata
- Suborder: Serpentes
- Family: Colubridae
- Genus: Geophis
- Species: G. turbidus

Binomial name
- Geophis turbidus Pavón-Vázquez, Canseco-Márquez, & Nieto-Montes de Oca, 2013

Species of snake

Geophis turbidus is a snake of the colubrid family. It is found in Mexico.
