= Geophis bicolor =

Conservation status
- Data Deficient (IUCN 3.1)

Scientific classification
- Kingdom: Animalia
- Phylum: Chordata
- Class: Reptilia
- Order: Squamata
- Suborder: Serpentes
- Family: Colubridae
- Genus: Geophis
- Species: G. bicolor

Binomial name
- Geophis bicolor Günther, 1868

Species of snake

Geophis bicolor, also known as the Mexican plateau earth snake, is a snake of the colubrid family. It is endemic to Mexico.
