= Micrurus nigrocinctus babaspul =

Scientific classification
- Domain: Eukaryota
- Kingdom: Animalia
- Phylum: Chordata
- Class: Reptilia
- Order: Squamata
- Suborder: Serpentes
- Family: Elapidae
- Genus: Micrurus
- Species: M. nigrocinctus
- Subspecies: M. n. babaspul

Trinomial name
- Micrurus nigrocinctus babaspul Roze, 1967

Subspecies of snake

Micrurus nigrocinctus babaspul, or the babaspul (Creole for "barber's pole"), is a subspecies of Micrurus nigrocinctus, commonly known as the Central American coral snake. M. n. babaspul is a venomous elapid from Big Corn Island (Isla Grande del Maíz), Nicaragua. According to O'Shea (2008) this is an endangered subspecies, and the subspecies may even be extinct.

== Description ==
M. n. babaspul is a tricoloured monadal coral snake. Its color pattern consists of rings in the order red/yellow/black/yellow/red. Being a monadal coral snake, it only has one black ring between each pair of red rings. It has a round small head with a long slender body. Adults may attain a total length (including tail) of 1.5–2 ft (46–61 cm).

== Geographic Range ==
The babaspul is endemic to Big Corn Island, Nicaragua.

== Habitat ==
M. n. babaspul inhabits tropical moist forests.

== Diet ==
The babaspul will actively hunt small lizards and small snakes, and if available will take some rodents small enough for it to consume.

== Reproduction ==
There is not much known about the reproduction of the babaspul, but it is believed to be an oviparous species.
