= Geophis rhodogaster =

Conservation status
- Least Concern (IUCN 3.1)

Scientific classification
- Kingdom: Animalia
- Phylum: Chordata
- Class: Reptilia
- Order: Squamata
- Suborder: Serpentes
- Family: Colubridae
- Genus: Geophis
- Species: G. rhodogaster

Binomial name
- Geophis rhodogaster (Cope, 1868)

Species of snake

Geophis rhodogaster, also known as the rosebelly earth snake, is a snake of the colubrid family. It is found in Mexico, Guatemala, El Salvador, and Honduras.
