= Geophis nephodrymus =

Conservation status
- Vulnerable (IUCN 3.1)

Scientific classification
- Kingdom: Animalia
- Phylum: Chordata
- Class: Reptilia
- Order: Squamata
- Suborder: Serpentes
- Family: Colubridae
- Genus: Geophis
- Species: G. nephodrymus

Binomial name
- Geophis nephodrymus Townsend & Wilson, 2006

Species of snake

Geophis nephodrymus is a species of snake in the colubrid family. It is endemic to the Sierra de Omoa in northwest Honduras.

== Description ==
The holotype is a female measuring 233 mm (9.2 in) in snout–vent length and 253 mm (10.0 in) in total length. Dorsal coloration is dark brownish black, becoming paler laterally. Ventral coloration is cream to pale yellow, with brown smudges on lateral areas of the ventral scales. The subcaudal scales are dark gray.

== Habitat and conservation ==
Geophis nephodrymus inhabits intact, closed-canopy cloud forest at elevations of 1,530–1,930 m (5,020–6,330 ft) above sea level. It is semifossorial and mostly nocturnal. Its habitat is threatened by deforestation caused by both timber extraction and agricultural expansion. It receives some protected from the Cusuco National Park.
