= Geophis pyburni =

Conservation status
- Data Deficient (IUCN 3.1)

Scientific classification
- Kingdom: Animalia
- Phylum: Chordata
- Class: Reptilia
- Order: Squamata
- Suborder: Serpentes
- Family: Colubridae
- Genus: Geophis
- Species: G. pyburni

Binomial name
- Geophis pyburni Campbell & Murphy, 1977

Species of snake

Geophis pyburni, also known as Pyburn's earth snake, is a species of snake in the colubrid family. It is endemic to Mexico. It is only known from its type locality, Rancho La Pastilla in the Sierra de Coalcoman, Michoacan.

== Etymology ==
The specific name, pyburni, is in honor of American herpetologist William Frank "Billy" Pyburn (1927–2007).

== Description ==
Geophis pyburni measure 24.7–29.9 cm (9.7–11.8 in) in total length. Tail makes 13–16 % of the total length. The dorsum is dark brown, becoming lighter laterally.
