= Geophis carinosus =

Conservation status
- Least Concern (IUCN 3.1)

Scientific classification
- Kingdom: Animalia
- Phylum: Chordata
- Class: Reptilia
- Order: Squamata
- Suborder: Serpentes
- Family: Colubridae
- Genus: Geophis
- Species: G. carinosus

Binomial name
- Geophis carinosus L.C. Stuart, 1941

Species of snake

Geophis carinosus, also known as the keeled earth snake, is a snake of the colubrid family. It is endemic to Mexico.
