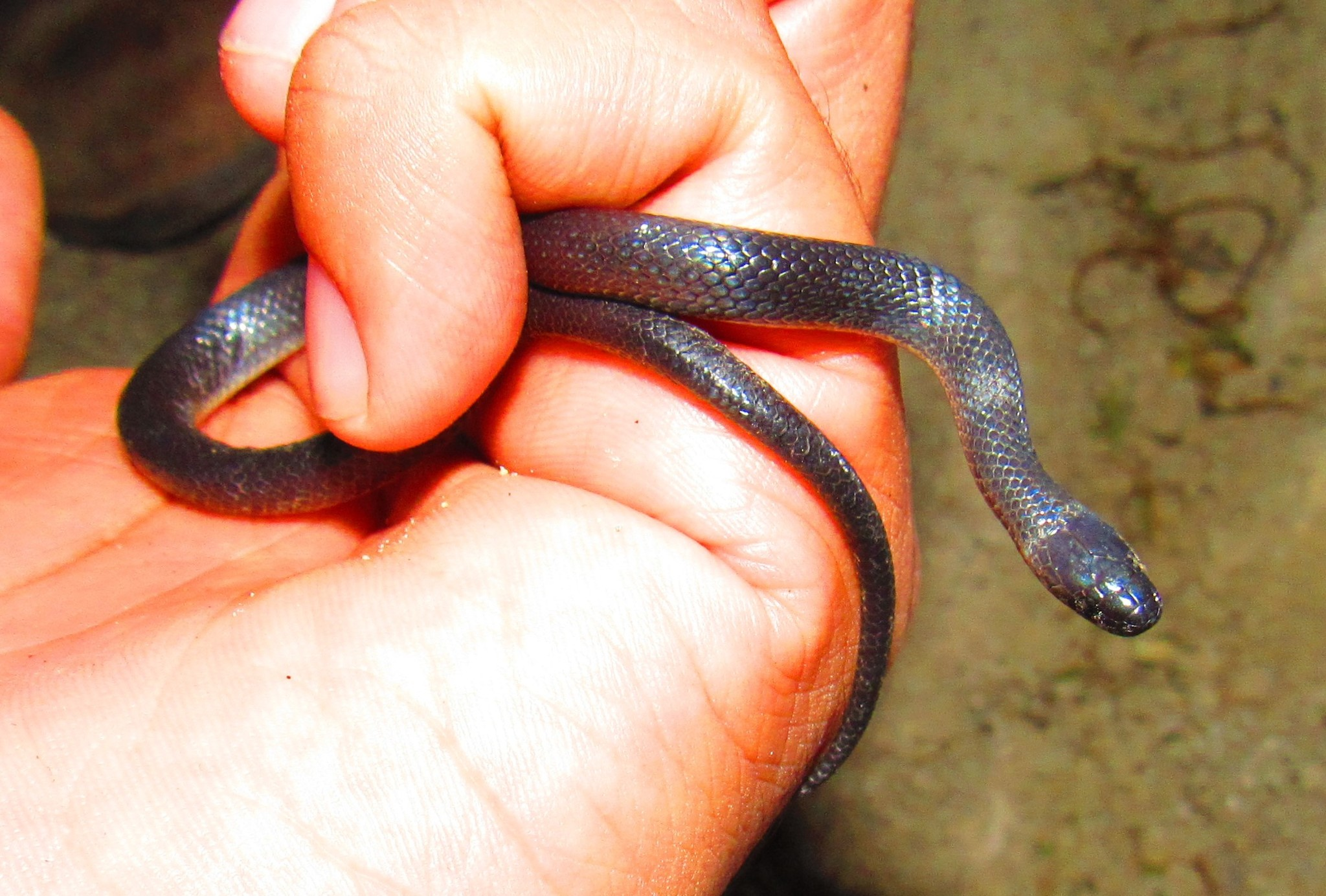

Conservation status
- Least Concern (IUCN 3.1)

Scientific classification
- Kingdom: Animalia
- Phylum: Chordata
- Class: Reptilia
- Order: Squamata
- Suborder: Serpentes
- Family: Colubridae
- Genus: Geophis
- Species: G. dugesii

Binomial name
- Geophis dugesii (Bocourt, 1883

= Geophis dugesii =

Species of snake

Geophis dugesii, also known as Dugès's earth snake, is a snake of the colubrid family. It is endemic to Mexico.
