= Geophis juliai =

Conservation status
- Vulnerable (IUCN 3.1)

Scientific classification
- Kingdom: Animalia
- Phylum: Chordata
- Class: Reptilia
- Order: Squamata
- Suborder: Serpentes
- Family: Colubridae
- Genus: Geophis
- Species: G. juliai

Binomial name
- Geophis juliai Pérez-Higareda, H.M. Smith & López-Luna, 2001

Species of snake

Geophis juliai, also known commonly as the Tuxtlan earth snake, Zurtuche's earth snake, and la minadora de Julia in Mexican Spanish, is a species of snake in the subfamily Dipsadinae of the family Colubridae. The species is endemic to Mexico.

== Etymology ==
The specific name, juliai, is in honor of Jordi Juliá-Zertuche, who was a Mexican entomologist and herpetologist.

== Geographic range ==
G. juliai is found in the southern part of the Mexican state of Veracruz.

== Habitat ==
The preferred natural habitat of G. juliai is forest, at altitudes of 100–600 m (330–1,970 ft).

== Behavior ==
G. juliai is terrestrial and semifossorial.

== Reproduction ==
G. juliai is oviparous.
