= Geophis berillus =

Scientific classification
- Kingdom: Animalia
- Phylum: Chordata
- Class: Reptilia
- Order: Squamata
- Suborder: Serpentes
- Family: Colubridae
- Genus: Geophis
- Species: G. berillus

Binomial name
- Geophis berillus Barragn-Resndiz, Pavón-Vázquez, Cervantes-Burgos, Trujano-Ortego, 2022

Species of snake

Geophis berillus is a snake of the colubrid family. It is endemic to Mexico.
