= Geophis lorancai =

Scientific classification
- Kingdom: Animalia
- Phylum: Chordata
- Class: Reptilia
- Order: Squamata
- Suborder: Serpentes
- Family: Colubridae
- Genus: Geophis
- Species: G. lorancai

Binomial name
- Geophis lorancai Canseco-Márquez, Pavón-Vázquez, López-Luna & Nieto-Montes de Oca, 2016

Species of snake

Geophis lorancai is a snake of the colubrid family. It was formally described in 2016 and is named after Miguel Ángel de la Torre Loranca, the biologist who collected much of the type series based on which the species was described. The top and sides of the head and the anterior portion of the body are black. The rest of the body are tail are reddish-orange with saddle- and Y-shaped black transverse marks. The underside of the head is pale grey and that of the body and tail is almost spotless reddish-orange. A Mexican endemic, it is only known from the Sierra de Zongolica of west-central Veracruz and the Sierra de Quimixtlán in adjacent extreme east-central Puebla. It inhabits cloud forests at elevations of 1,210–1,700 m (3,970–5,580 ft).

== Taxonomy ==
Geophis lorancai was formally described in 2016 based on an adult male specimen collected from the Instituto Tecnológico Superior de Zongolica in the municipality of Los Reyes in the state of Veracruz, Mexico. The species is named after Miguel Ángel de la Torre Loranca, a biologist who collected much of the type series based on which the species was described.

== Description ==
The top and sides of the head and the anterior portion of the body are black. The remainder of the body, past roughly the twelfth middorsal scale, is reddish-orange with black transverse marks. There are 13–20 black transverse marks on the body, most of which are saddle-shaped. A minority of the marks are Y-shaped. There are reddish-orange rings between adjacent saddles. The tail also has 4–10 black transverse marks. The underside of the head is pale grey and that of the body and tail is almost spotless reddish-orange. The tail surface is increasingly dark posteriorly.

== Distribution and habitat ==
Geophis lorancai is only known from the Sierra de Zongolica of west-central Veracruz and the Sierra de Quimixtlán in adjacent extreme east-central Puebla. These mountains have irregular terrain with numerous hills, ascents and descents, and streams. The predominant vegetation is cloud forest and pine-oak associations. The present snake has only been recorded from leaf litter and under fallen logs in cloud forests at elevations of 1,210–1,700 m (3,970–5,580 ft).
