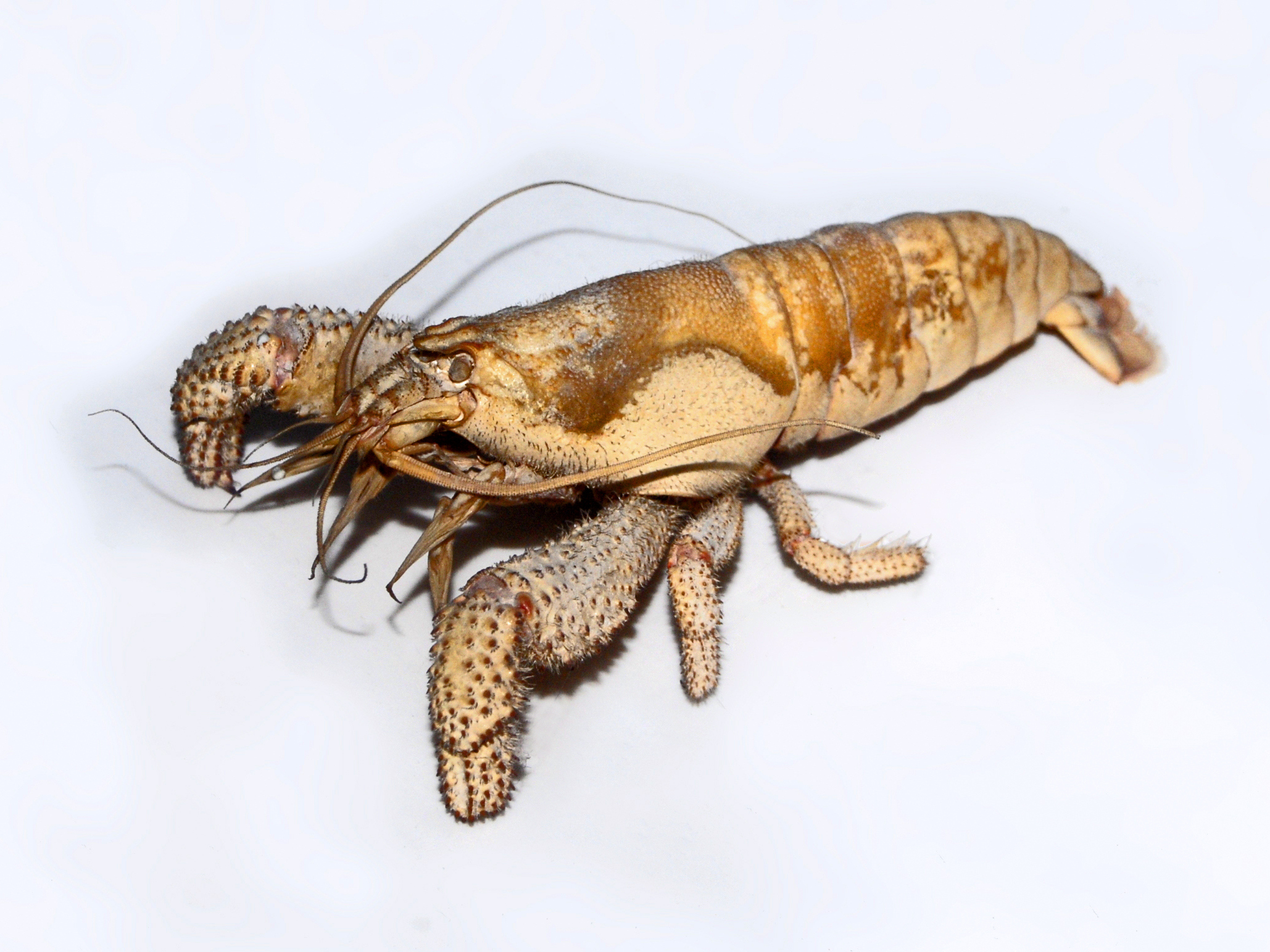
- Museum specimen of Atya scabra

Conservation status
- Least Concern (IUCN 3.1)

Scientific classification
- Kingdom: Animalia
- Phylum: Arthropoda
- Class: Malacostraca
- Order: Decapoda
- Suborder: Pleocyemata
- Infraorder: Caridea
- Family: Atyidae
- Genus: Atya
- Species: A. scabra

Binomial name
- Atya scabra (Leach, 1816)

Synonyms
- Atya margaritacea clavipes Holthuis, 1966; Atya margaritacea var. claviger Aurivillius, 1898; Atya mexicana Wiegmann, 1836; Atya punctata Kingsley, 1878; Atya sulcatipes Newport, 1847; Atys scaber Leach, 1816

= Atya scabra =

Species of crustacean

Atya scabra is a species of freshwater shrimp in the family Atyidae. Atya scabra can reach a length of about 89 millimetres (3.5 in) in males, while females are generally smaller, reaching about 64 mm (2.5 in). It lives on rocky bottoms in rivers connected to the Atlantic Ocean. The species is widespread from Mexico to Brazil, Jamaica, Hispaniola, and Puerto Rico. In Africa, it occurs from Liberia to Angola, the Cape Verde Islands and the islands of the Gulf of Guinea.

The species is commonly used as bait in commercial fishing, mostly in the northern regions of Brazil. To maintain stable populations, a no-take period from May to August and a minimum take length of 70 mm (2.8 in) have been proposed.
