= Geophis dubius =

Conservation status
- Least Concern (IUCN 3.1)

Scientific classification
- Kingdom: Animalia
- Phylum: Chordata
- Class: Reptilia
- Order: Squamata
- Suborder: Serpentes
- Family: Colubridae
- Genus: Geophis
- Species: G. dubius

Binomial name
- Geophis dubius (Peters, 1861)

Species of snake

Geophis dubius, also known as the Mesa del Sur earth snake, is a snake of the colubrid family. It is endemic to Mexico. This species is endemic to the state of Oaxaca in Mexico. It is found between 2,100 and 2,650 m of altitude.
