= Elegant coral snake =

Conservation status
- Least Concern (IUCN 3.1)

Scientific classification
- Kingdom: Animalia
- Phylum: Chordata
- Class: Reptilia
- Order: Squamata
- Suborder: Serpentes
- Family: Elapidae
- Genus: Micrurus
- Species: M. elegans

Binomial name
- Micrurus elegans (Jan, 1858)
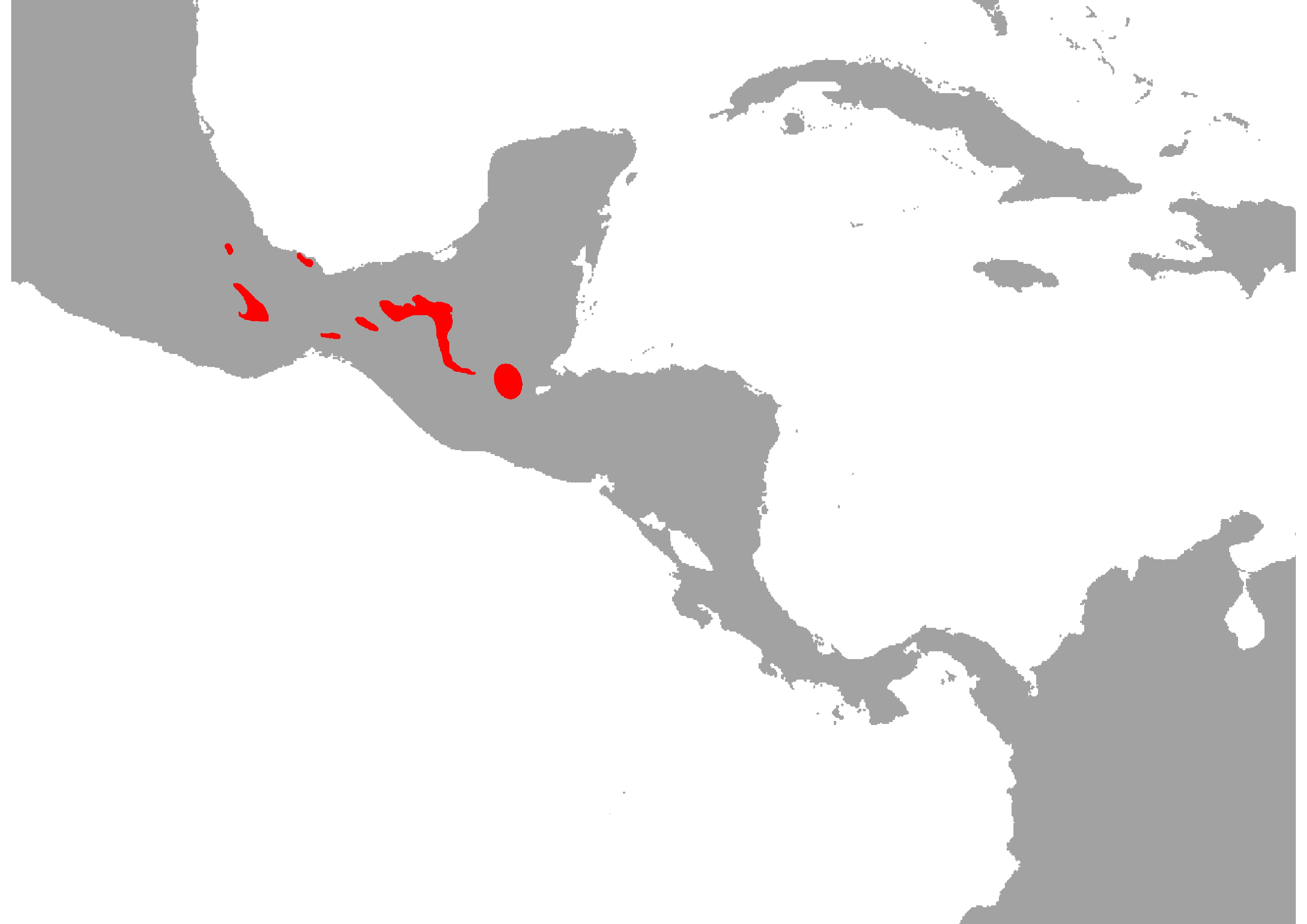

Synonyms
- Elaps elegans Jan, 1858; Micrurus elegans — Schmidt, 1933

Species of snake

The elegant coral snake (Micrurus elegans), also known commonly as coralillo elegante in Spanish, is a species of venomous snake in the family Elapidae. The species is native to southern Mexico and Guatemala. There are two recognized subspecies.

== Description ==
Micrurus elegans has a color pattern which is unique for its genus. The narrow white or yellow rings of the black triads are interrupted by black, and as a result appear as series of light spots rather than complete rings. Medium-sized for the genus Micrurus, adults usually have a total length (tail included) of 40–60 cm (16–24 in). The maximum recorded total length is 73.3 cm (28.9 in).

== Geographic range ==
Micrurus elegans occurs at elevations from 500–1,000 m (1,600–3,300 ft) above sea level in southern Mexico (from central Veracruz, northern Oaxaca, and the Sierra de los Tuxtlas, southeastward through southern Tabasco, northern Chiapas), and Guatemala (the Caribbean versant of the northern mountains of Guatemala southwards to the Sierra de las Minas).

== Habitat ==
The preferred natural habitat of Micrurus elegans is forest, but it has also been found in agricultural areas.

== Reproduction ==
Micurus elegans is oviparous.

== Subspecies ==
There are two subspecies that are recognized as being valid, including the nominotypical subspecies.

- Micrurus elegans elegans (Jan, 1858)
- Micrurus elegans veraepacis Schmidt, 1933

Nota bene: A trinomial authority in parentheses indicates that the subspecies was originally described in a genus other than Micrurus.
