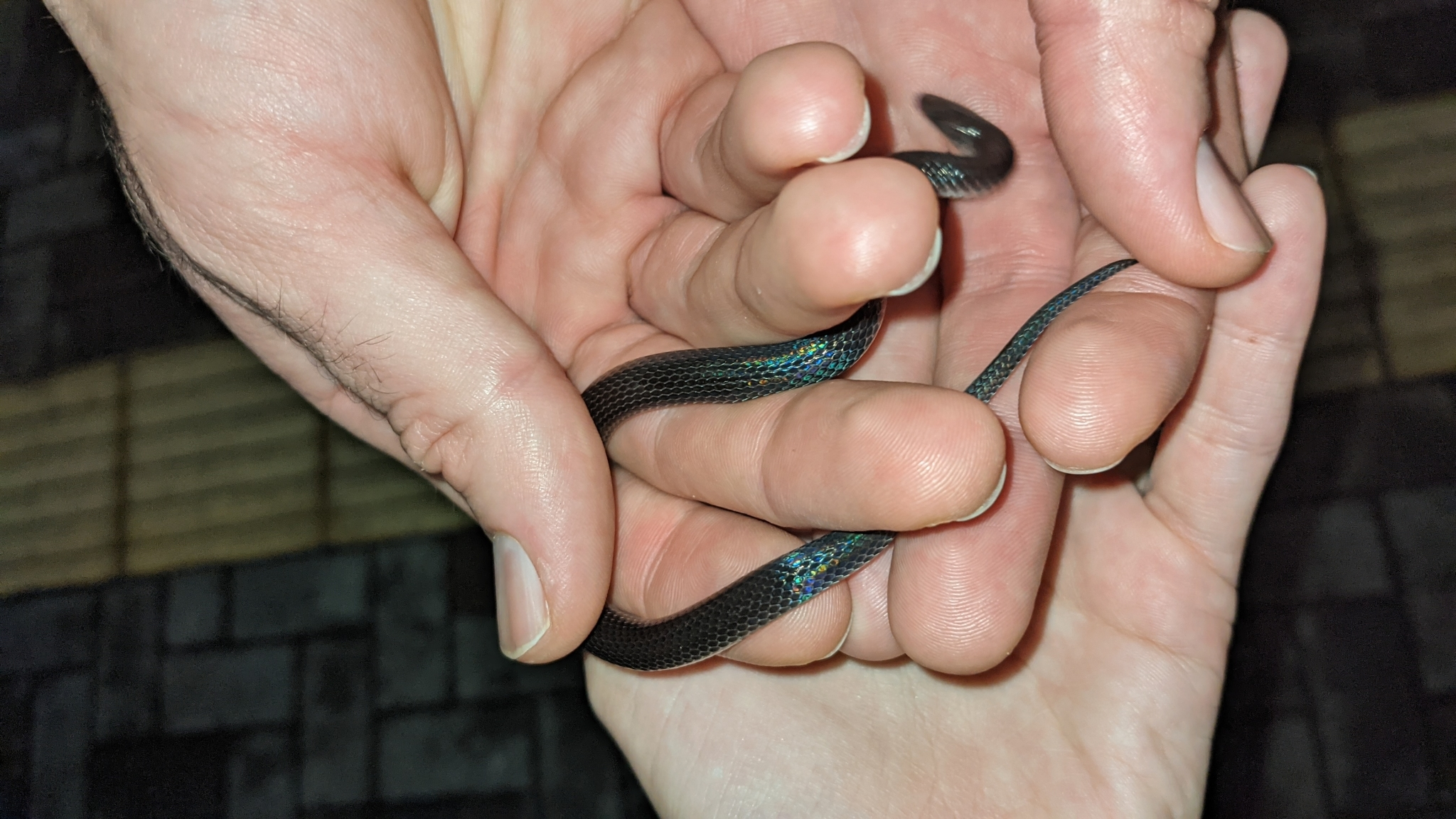

Conservation status
- Least Concern (IUCN 3.1)

Scientific classification
- Kingdom: Animalia
- Phylum: Chordata
- Class: Reptilia
- Order: Squamata
- Suborder: Serpentes
- Family: Colubridae
- Genus: Geophis
- Species: G. hoffmanni

Binomial name
- Geophis hoffmanni (W. Peters, 1859)

Synonyms
- Colobognathus hoffmanni W. Peters, 1859; Elapoides hoffmanni — Jan, 1865; Geophis hoffmanni — Bocourt, 1883; Catastoma hoffmanni — Amaral, 1929; Geophis bartholomewi Brattstrom & T. Howell, 1954; Geophis acutirotris Taylor, 1954; Geophis hoffmanni — Downs, 1967

= Geophis hoffmanni =

Species of snake

Geophis hoffmanni, also known commonly as Hoffmann's earth snake, is a species of snake in the subfamily Dipsadinae of the family Colubridae. The species is native to Central America.

== Etymology ==
The specific name, hoffmanni, is in honor of German naturalist Karl Hoffmann.

== Geographic range ==
G. hoffmanni is found in Costa Rica, Honduras, Nicaragua, and Panama.

== Habitat ==
The preferred natural habitat of G. hoffmanni is forest, at altitudes of 18–2,100 m (59–6,890 ft), but it is also found in disturbed areas such as farms and gardens.

== Description ==
A small species of snake, the holotype of G. hoffmanni has a total length (including tail) of 24.5 cm (9.6 in) (W. Peters, 1859). The dorsal scales are arranged in 15 rows throughout the length of the body. There are five or fewer upper labials, and the posterior chin shields contact each other. The ventrals number 114–131, and the subcaudals number 23–32. Adults are uniformly dark brown or black dorsally, and are white or cream-colored ventrally. Juveniles have a paler nuchal collar.

== Behavior ==
G. hoffmanni is terrestrial and secretive, sheltering under logs and rocks.

== Reproduction ==
G. hoffmanni is oviparous.
