= Geophis fulvoguttatus =

Conservation status
- Endangered (IUCN 3.1)

Scientific classification
- Kingdom: Animalia
- Phylum: Chordata
- Class: Reptilia
- Order: Squamata
- Suborder: Serpentes
- Family: Colubridae
- Genus: Geophis
- Species: G. fulvoguttatus

Binomial name
- Geophis fulvoguttatus Mertens, 1952

Species of snake

Geophis fulvoguttatus, also known as Mertens's earth snake, is a snake of the colubrid family. It is found in El Salvador and Honduras.
