= Geophis brachycephalus =

Conservation status
- Least Concern (IUCN 3.1)

Scientific classification
- Kingdom: Animalia
- Phylum: Chordata
- Class: Reptilia
- Order: Squamata
- Suborder: Serpentes
- Family: Colubridae
- Genus: Geophis
- Species: G. brachycephalus

Binomial name
- Geophis brachycephalus (Cope, 1871)

Species of snake

Geophis brachycephalus, also known as the Costa Rican earth snake, is a snake of the colubrid family. It is found in Costa Rica and Panama.
