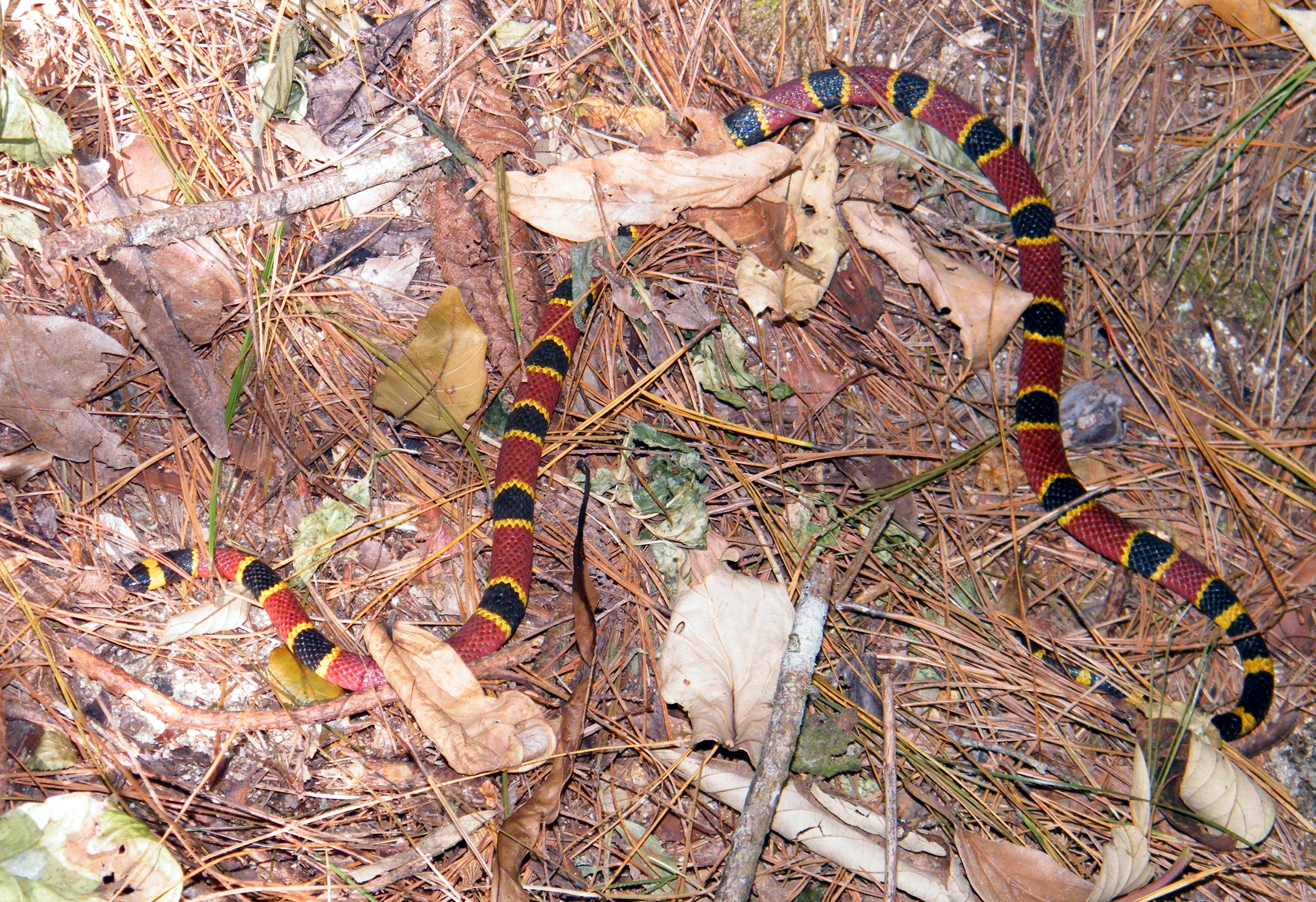

Conservation status
- Least Concern (IUCN 3.1)

Scientific classification
- Kingdom: Animalia
- Phylum: Chordata
- Class: Reptilia
- Order: Squamata
- Suborder: Serpentes
- Family: Elapidae
- Genus: Micrurus
- Species: M. nigrocinctus

Binomial name
- Micrurus nigrocinctus (Girard, 1854)
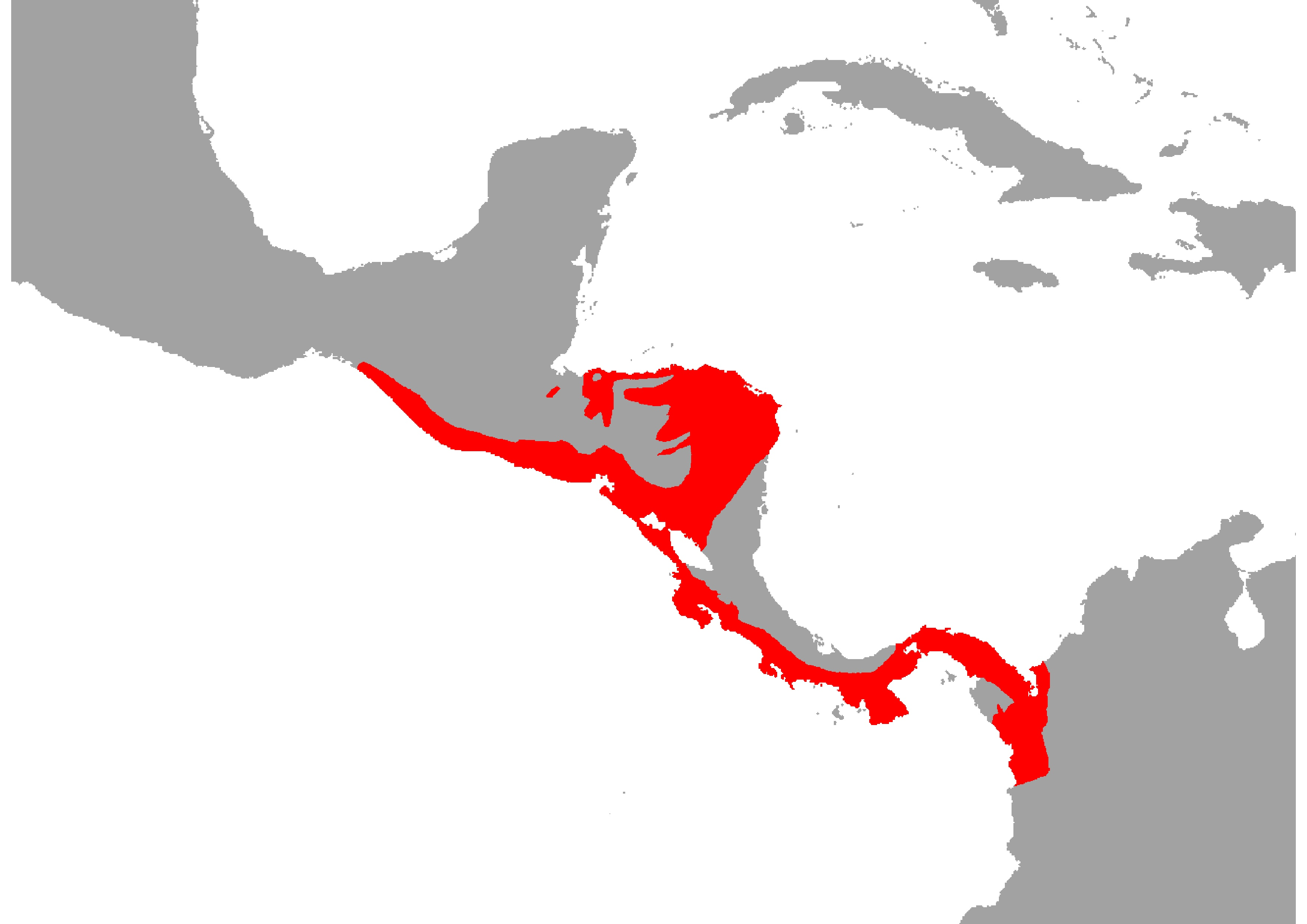

Synonyms
- Elaps nigrocinctus Girard, 1854; Micrurus nigrocinctus — Schmidt, 1932

= Micrurus nigrocinctus =

Species of snake

Micrurus nigrocinctus, commonly known as the Central American coral snake, is a species of a highly venomous snake in the family Elapidae. The species is endemic to Latin America from southern Mexico, Central America, to north Colombia. There are five recognized subspecies, including the nominate subspecies described here.

== Common names ==
Common names for Micrurus nigrocinctus include Central American coral snake, and in Spanish: serpiente-coralillo centroamericana, coral centroamericana, coralillo, gargantilla, salviara, limlim, babaspul, and coral macho.

== Description ==
The Central American coral snake is capable of growing to a total length (tail included) of 115 cm (45 in), but most are closer to 65 cm (26 in). It has smooth dorsal scales, a rounded head, and the pupil of the eye is round. Its color pattern can vary from two-colored to three-colored, with black, yellow and red rings. The snout is black. On the head, there is usually a yellow parietal band (in three-colored specimens) or a red parietal band (in bi-colored specimens). The color pattern on the body consists of often fairly broad red rings separated by much narrower sets of yellow-black-yellow rings. The number of black rings on the body may vary from 10 to 24, with an additional 3 to 8 on the tail. Males have supraanal tubercles.

== Geographic range ==
Micrurus nigrocinctus ranges from southern Mexico through Central America (except Belize) to northwestern Colombia, and the western Caribbean.

== Habitat ==
Micrurus nigrocinctus is mainly found in lowland rain forest, lowland dry forest, thorn forest, lower montane wet (or moist) forest, and lower montane dry forest, usually at elevations up to 1,300 m (4,300 ft).

== Behavior ==
Micrurus nigrocinctus is mainly a terrestrial snake that often dwells in burrows, leaf litter, or under logs. Like most coral snakes it is usually nocturnal, though it may also be active at dusk and dawn, and sometimes after rainfall. While usually not aggressive, it will bite when molested or restrained.

== Diet ==
Micrurus nigrocinctus preys upon invertebrates, amphibians, lizards, and other snakes.

== Reproduction ==
Micrurus nigrocinctus is oviparous.

== Venom ==
The Central American coral snake's venom contains a strong neurotoxin, causing neuromuscular dysfunction. Its LD50 is 0.3 mg/kg (IV), 1.7 mg/kg (SC) and 0.4 mg/kg(IP), the average venom yield is 8 mg. However, the maximum recorded venom yield is 20 mg, which is approximately four times the estimated lethal dose of 4–6 mg for an adult human.

== Subspecies ==
There are five subspecies of Micrurus nigrocinctus that are recognized as being valid, including the nominotypical subspecies.

- Micrurus nigrocinctus babaspul Roze, 1967
- Micrurus nigrocinctus coibensis Schmidt, 1936
- Micrurus nigrocinctus divaricatus (Hallowell, 1855)
- Micrurus nigrocinctus nigrocinctus (Girard, 1854)
- Micrurus nigrocinctus zunilensis Schmidt, 1932

Nota bene: A trinomial authority in parentheses indicates that the subspecies was originally described in a genus other than Micrurus.
