= Atya =

Scientific classification
- Kingdom: Animalia
- Phylum: Arthropoda
- Clade: Pancrustacea
- Class: Malacostraca
- Order: Decapoda
- Suborder: Pleocyemata
- Infraorder: Caridea
- Family: Atyidae
- Genus: Atya; Leach, 1815

Genus of crustaceans

Atya is a genus of freshwater shrimp of the family Atyidae, ranging through the Antilles and along the Atlantic and Pacific slopes of Central and South America and in western Africa. It contains the following species:

- Atya abelei Felgenhauer & Martin, 1983
- Atya africana Bouvier, 1904
- Atya brachyrhinus Hobbs & Hart, 1982
- Atya crassa (Smith, 1871)
- Atya dressleri Abele, 1975
- Atya gabonensis Giebel, 1875
- Atya innocous (Herbst, 1792)
- Atya intermedia Bouvier, 1904
- Atya lanipes Holthuis, 1963
- Atya limnetes Holthuis, 1986
- Atya margaritacea A. Milne-Edwards, 1864
- Atya ortmannioides Villalobos F., 1956
- Atya scabra (Leach, 1816)
- Atya tenella Smith, 1871
