= Karen Lips =

US herpetologist

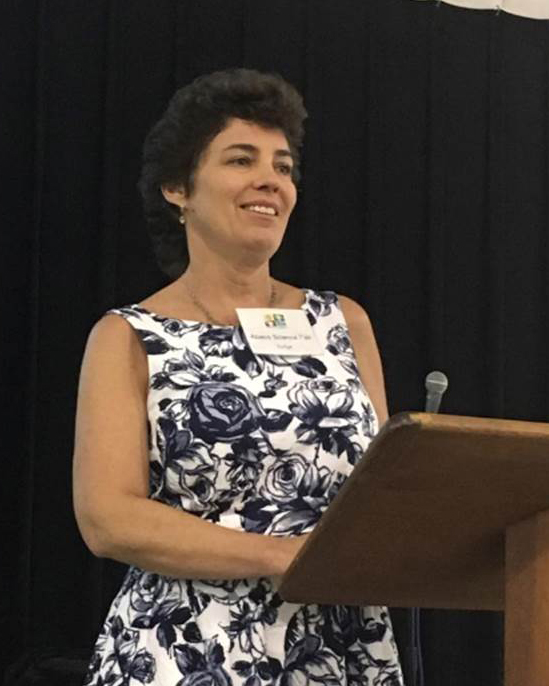
- Education: University of South Florida, BS, 1988; University of Miami, PhD, 1995
- Known for: Contributing to the identification of chytridiomycosis and advocacy efforts in environmental conservation
- Scientific career
- Fields: Ecology, Herpetology, Conservation
- Workplaces: St. Lawrence University; Southern Illinois University, Carbondale; University of Maryland, College Park
- Thesis: The population biology of Hyla calypsa, a stream-breeding treefrog from lower Central America (1995)
- Doctoral advisor: Jay M. Savage
- Website: Research website

Karen R. Lips is a professor of biology at University of Maryland, College Park. Lips' work in the 1990s eventually contributed to the identification of the chytrid fungus as the primary cause of frog decline worldwide.

== Education and early career ==
Lips received her Bachelor of Science in zoology from University of South Florida in 1988. She then spent a year researching at the Organization for Tropical Studies in Costa Rica through their program Tropical Biology: An Ecological Approach. In 1995, she received her PhD in biology at University of Miami in the research group of herpetologist Jay M. Savage. Her doctoral research centered on studying the population ecology of Isthmohyla calypsa—a tree frog found only in the Talamancan mountains—in the Reserva Protectora Las Tablas in Costa Rica. She moved to the region in 1991 and by 1993 observed that the population of these frogs had declined dramatically. She documented their population dynamics and breeding patterns in her dissertation, The population biology of Hyla calypsa, a stream-breeding treefrog from lower Central America. During her graduate work, she also documented the disappearance of the toad Incilius fastidiosus, on the heals of the mysterious extinction of the golden toad. While she initially did not have an explanation for the disappearances she'd observed, her graduate work—combined with the observations of a number of amphibian ecologists—eventually contributed to the identification of chytridiomycosis, an infectious disease that has wiped out amphibian populations around the world.

== Research ==
Lips research primarily centers on understanding the ecological and environmental factors that influence how amphibian species respond to diseases in order to devise evidence-based strategies for conservation and recovery of endangered species. She and her collaborators also work to determine how human activities can contribute to the spread of diseases and the ultimate loss of biodiversity.

Following her PhD, Lips became an assistant professor at St. Lawrence University between 1995 and 1998. In that position, she returned to Costa Rica in 1996 and observed the overall abundance of frogs in the region was down 90%. Her observations echoed those documented at a number of other ecological sites where amphibians were mysteriously dying off over the previous 15 years. While some of the population decline could be attributed to habitat destruction, the areas Lips was researching were untouched and relatively unexplored environments. She moved her field research site to Fortuna, Costa Rica where she and her colleagues, including Rick Speare, found dead and dying frogs. They collected 50 dead frogs to send back to a veterinary pathologist in Maryland, who discovered that a protozoan of some sort had infiltrated their skin. With a team of collaborators, the protozoan was eventually identified as Batrachochytrium dendrobatidis, or Bd, which belongs to a phylum of fungus called chytrids. Amphibians drink and breathe by absorbing water and oxygen through their skin, but chytrids grow all over their bodies and interfere with their blood chemistry, leading to organ failure and eventual death. Since Bd was identified, it's been implicated in the collapse or extinction of over 200 amphibian species.

Between 1998 and 2008, Lips was an assistant, and later associate, professor at Southern Illinois University Carbondale. In 2004, her graduate students observed and began documenting a new chytrid outbreak in El Copé, Panama. In the wake of the outbreak, Lips and her colleagues in ecology and environmental conservation began evaluating the threat of such epidemics on biodiversity and discussing policy interventions.

Starting in 2008, Lips became a professor at University of Maryland, College Park, where she currently serves as the director of the Graduate Program in Sustainable Development and Conservation Biology. She also holds a research associate appointment at the Smithsonian Tropical Research Institute and at the U.S. Museum of Natural History. In this position, she has studied the amphibian declines in several more regions, including those documented over the last 50 years in the Appalachian Mountains in collaboration with her colleague Dick Highton. Her research group and collaborators have also observed and documented the spread of chytrids to salamander populations, which are infected by a species related to Bd known as Batrachochytrium salamandrivorans, or Bsal. The exotic pet trade has been implicated in the spread of Bsal, and Lips and her colleagues successfully advocated for banning salamander import into the United States.

== Advocacy and public engagement ==
Between 2016 and 2017, Lips served in the United States Department of State as a Jefferson Science Fellow in the Bureau of Western Hemisphere Affairs in the Office of Public Diplomacy and Public Affairs. There, her portfolio centered on issues related to environmental science, climate change, implementation of the Sustainable Development Goals, STEM education, and increasing representation of women in science, technology, engineering, and mathematics fields. She also traveled to posts across Latin America and the Caribbean to meet with decision makers, leaders in science, and educators to discuss science and education.

Lips has also engaged in science communication. She wrote about her early experiences in amphibian conservation as part of a special PLOS Biology collection "Conservation Stories from the Front Lines," which was curated in part by Liz Neeley, the Executive Director of the science-inspired storytelling nonprofit The Story Collider. She published a similar account for Scientific American, advocating as well for the importance of science communication to raise awareness around issues of conservation. She has also used her writing as a platform for advocacy, for instance, co-authoring a 2015 op-ed in The New York Times warning against the import of Asian salamanders through the pet trade to stop the spread of Bd to American salamanders. The advocacy efforts of her and her colleagues led the United States Fish and Wildlife Service to ban the import of 201 salamander species under the authority of the Lacey Act, which went into effect January 2016.

Her general publications about frogs inspired a German documentary film company, mobyDOK, to collaborate with her on a 16-minute animated film titled "The Waiting" about the extinction of frog species due to the still unstoppable spread of the Chytrid fungus. The film was shown in competition in the short film programme at the 2023 Berlinale.

== Awards and honors ==
- President's Award, Chicago Zoological Society, 1997
- Aldo Leopold Leadership Fellow, Stanford Woods Institute for the Environment, 2005
- American Association for the Advancement of Science Fellow, 2011
- Sabin Award for Amphibian Conservation, Amphibian Survival Alliance, 2012
- University of Maryland Impact Communicator Award, 2015
- Leshner Leadership Institute Public Engagement Fellow, American Association for the Advancement of Science, 2016
- Elected Fellow of the Ecological Society of America, 2016
- Jefferson Science Fellow, National Academy of Sciences, 2016–17
