= Emmett Reid Dunn =

American herpetologist (1894–1956)

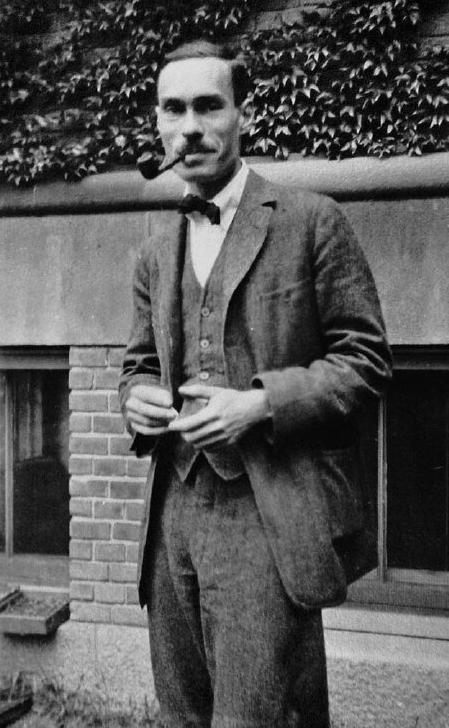
- C. 1924
- Born: November 21, 1894; Arlington, Virginia
- Died: February 13, 1956 (aged 61); Bryn Mawr, Pennsylvania
- Education: Haverford College, Harvard University
- Scientific career
- Fields: Herpetology
- Workplaces: Academy of Natural Sciences, American Museum of Natural History, Museum of Comparative Zoology

Emmett Reid Dunn (November 21, 1894 – February 13, 1956) was an American herpetologist and educator who worked in Panama and studied salamanders in the Eastern United States.

== Early life and education ==
Emmett Reid Dunn was born on November 21, 1894, in Arlington, Virginia, to Emmett Clark Dunn, a civil engineer, and Mary Reid. He spent much of his childhood at a family farm near the James River in Nelson County. He attended Haverford College in Philadelphia, receiving his B.A. and M.A. in 1915 and 1916, respectively. His childhood connection to Arlington allowed him to connect with his first professional mentor, Leonhard Stejneger, the Curator of Reptiles and Amphibians at the Smithsonian Institution, who in 1913 suggested he study salamanders. Henry Sherring Pratt, his professor at Haverford, also guided him. He received his PhD from Harvard University in 1921.

== Career ==
In 1915, Dunn began publishing scientific papers on snakes and herpetofauna, based on field research he conducted as a teenager in Midway Mills, Virginia. After receiving his M.A. from Haverford in 1916, he conducted field research on plethodontid salamanders and other amphibians in the Appalachian Mountains of North Carolina, sponsored by Mary Dickerson, the Curator of Herpetology at the American Museum of Natural History. That year, he began teaching at Smith College in the Zoology Department. He briefly left the position from 1917 to 1918 to serve as an ensign in the U.S. Naval Reserve in World War I, though did not see combat. He returned to Smith in 1918, where he remained until 1928.

While at Smith, Dunn worked closely with H.M. Parshley, Harris Hawthorne Wilder, and Thomas Barbour on his salamander research. He also served as the editor of Copeia, the journal of the American Society of Ichthyologists and Herpetologists, from 1924 to 1929. In 1926, he published The Salamanders of the Family Plethodontidae, the most detailed analysis of amphibians published at the time. He resigned from the assistant professorship at Smith in 1928 after receiving a Guggenheim Fellowship, which funded research trips to European museums and tropical climates, including Panama, Cuba, Colombia, Mexico, and Costa Rica.

In 1929, Dunn began teaching in the Biology and Zoology departments at his alma mater, Haverford College, where he remained until his death in 1956. In 1930, he married Alta Merle Taylor, a former Physical Education instructor at Smith College. Taylor accompanied him on several expeditions and often assisted with his research at Haverford and other institutions. Dunn's proximity to Philadelphia led him to become the Honorary Curator of Reptiles at the Academy of Natural Sciences in 1937, another position that he held until his death. Here, he and his wife worked extensively with specimens collected by Edward Drinker Cope that had fallen into disarray without a dedicated herpetology staff. From 1930 to 1931, he served as the president of the American Society of Ichthyologists and Herpetologists.

In 1944, Dunn continued field work in South America through the Nelson Rockefeller Committee's Inter-American Cultural Exchange Program. He completed a census of snakes in Panama with the assistance of Herbert C. Clark and the Gorgas Memorial Institute of Tropical and Preventative Medicine. He was also affiliated with research at the American Museum of Natural History, the Museum of Comparative Zoology, and the United States National Museum. Throughout his career, he discovered roughly forty new species of frogs, salamanders, lizards, snakes, and turtles, and has been noted for his significant contributions to the classification and phylogeny of salamanders.

Dunn died at age 61 on February 13, 1956, in Bryn Mawr, Pennsylvania.

== Eponyms ==
A number of reptiles were named in honor of Dunn, both species (binomials) and subspecies (trinomials), including the following.

Species:

- Anolis dunni H.M. Smith, 1936 – Dunn's anole
- Atractus dunni Savage, 1955 – Dunn's ground snake
- Geophis dunni K.P. Schmidt, 1932 – Dunn's earth snake
- Hydromorphus dunni Slevin, 1942 – Dunn's water snake
- Kinosternon dunni K.P. Schmidt, 1947 – Colombian mud turtle
- Micrablepharus dunni Laurent, 1949 – Dunn's tinyfoot teiid, a synonym of Micrablepharus maximiliani (J.T. Reinhardt & Lütken, 1862)
- Porthidium dunni (Hartweg & J.A. Oliver, 1938) – Dunn's hognose pitviper
- Sibon dunni J.A. Peters, 1957 – Dunn's snail sucker
- Sinonatrix dunni (Malnate, 1968), a synonym of Natrix tessellata (Laurenti, 1768)
- Sphaerodactylus dunni K.P. Schmidt, 1936 – Dunn's least gecko

Subspecies:

- Liasis mackloti dunni Stull, 1932 – Wetar python
- Mastigodryas boddaerti dunni (L.C. Stuart, 1933) – Dunn's tropical racer
- Micrurus dissoleucus dunni Barbour, 1923 – Dunn's pygmy coral snake

This author abbreviation is not to be confused with Dunn in botany, where it refers to Stephen Troyte Dunn.

== See also ==
- Category:Taxa named by Emmett Reid Dunn
