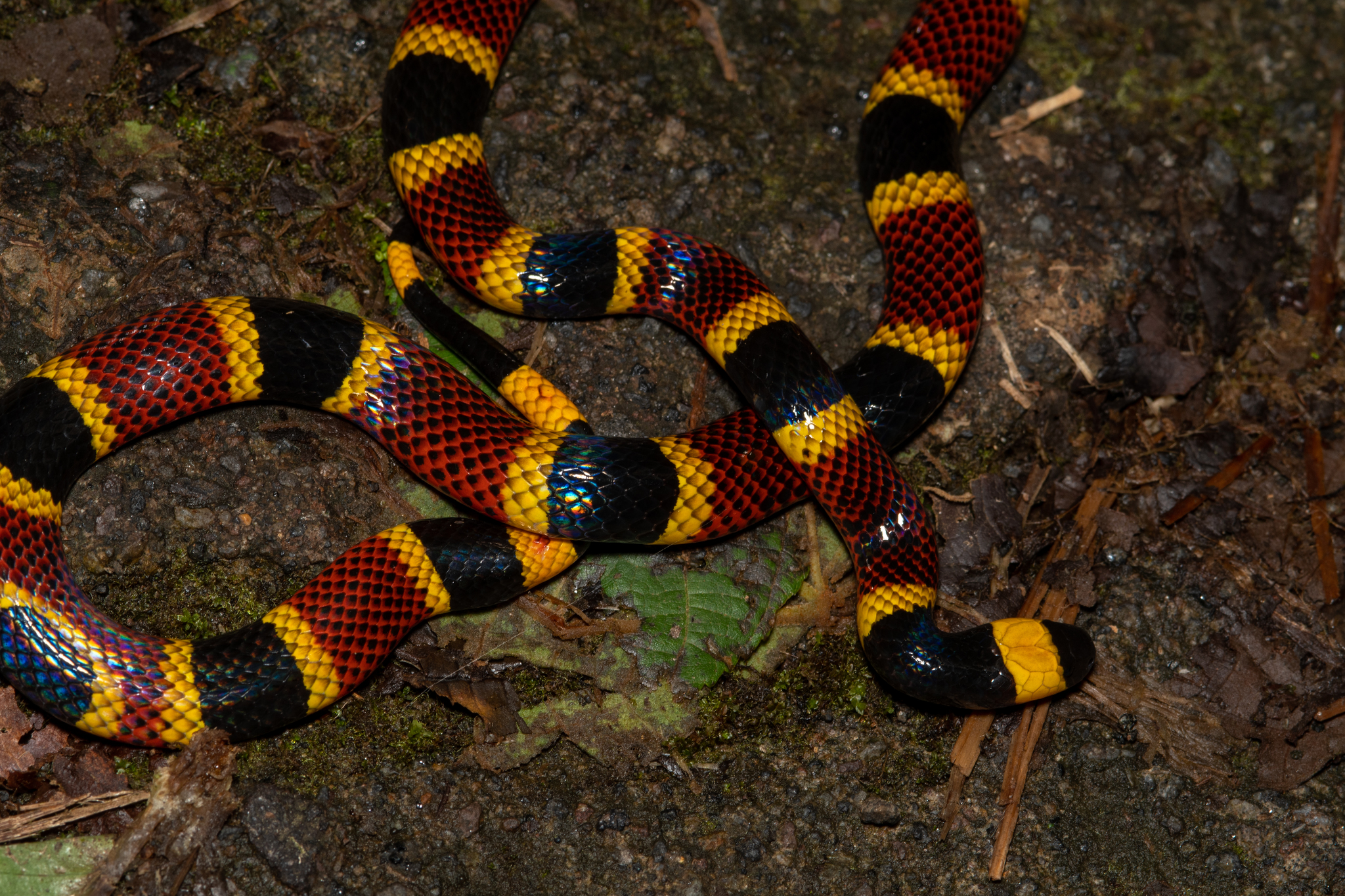

Conservation status
- Least Concern (IUCN 3.1)

Scientific classification
- Kingdom: Animalia
- Phylum: Chordata
- Class: Reptilia
- Order: Squamata
- Suborder: Serpentes
- Family: Elapidae
- Genus: Micrurus
- Species: M. mosquitensis

Binomial name
- Micrurus mosquitensis Schmidt, 1933
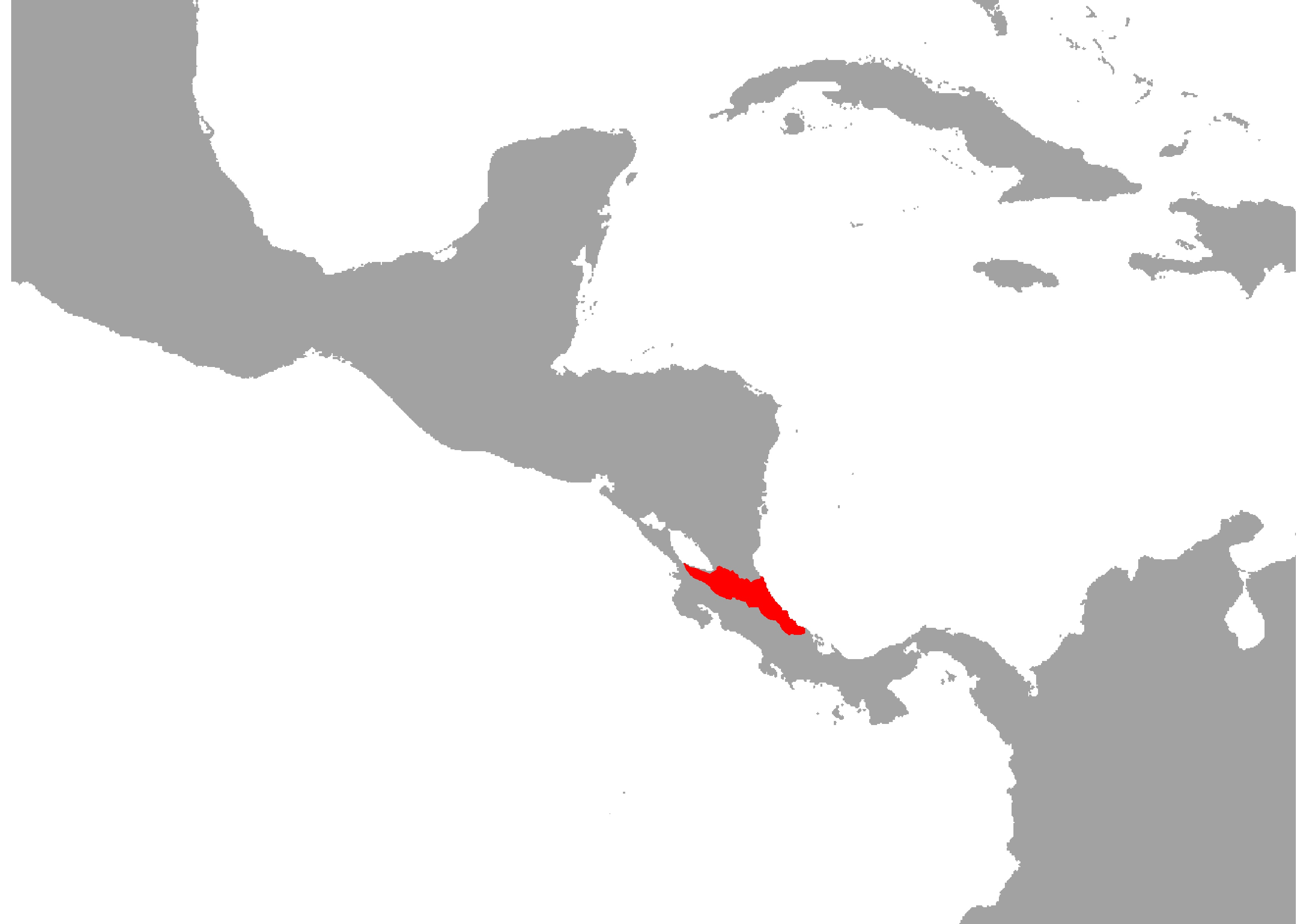

Synonyms
- Micrurus nigrocinctus mosquitensis Schmidt, 1933

= Micrurus mosquitensis =

Species of snake

Micrurus mosquitensis, also known commonly as the mosquito coral snake and la coral misquita in Central American Spanish, is a species of venomous snake in the family Elapidae. The species is native to Central America.

== Description ==
As in many species of the genus Micrurus, the color pattern of Micrurus mosquitensis consists of black, yellow, and red rings. The black rings are not arranged in triads, and there are 10–15 black rings on the body. The yellow rings are the narrowest, but are wider than in most coral snakes. The red rings are the widest, and have large black tips on the dorsal scales.

Males have 182–192 ventrals and 46–52 subcaudals; females have 197–211 ventrals and 35–43 subcaudals.

Males have strongly developed supraanal tubercles.

Adults usually have a total length of 50–75 cm (20–30 in).

== Geographic distribution ==
Micrurus mosquitensis is found in Costa Rica, Nicaragua, and Panama.

== Habitat ==
The preferred natural habitat of Micrurus mosquitensis is forest, at altitudes from sea level to 900 m (3,000 ft).

== Behavior ==
Micrurus mosquitensis is terrestrial.

== Diet ==
Micrurus mosquitensis preys on lizards such as Scincella cherriei and Cnemidophorus spp., snakes such as Coniophanes fissidens and Ninia maculata, and also eats lizard eggs.

== Reproduction ==
Micrurus mosquitensis is oviparous.
