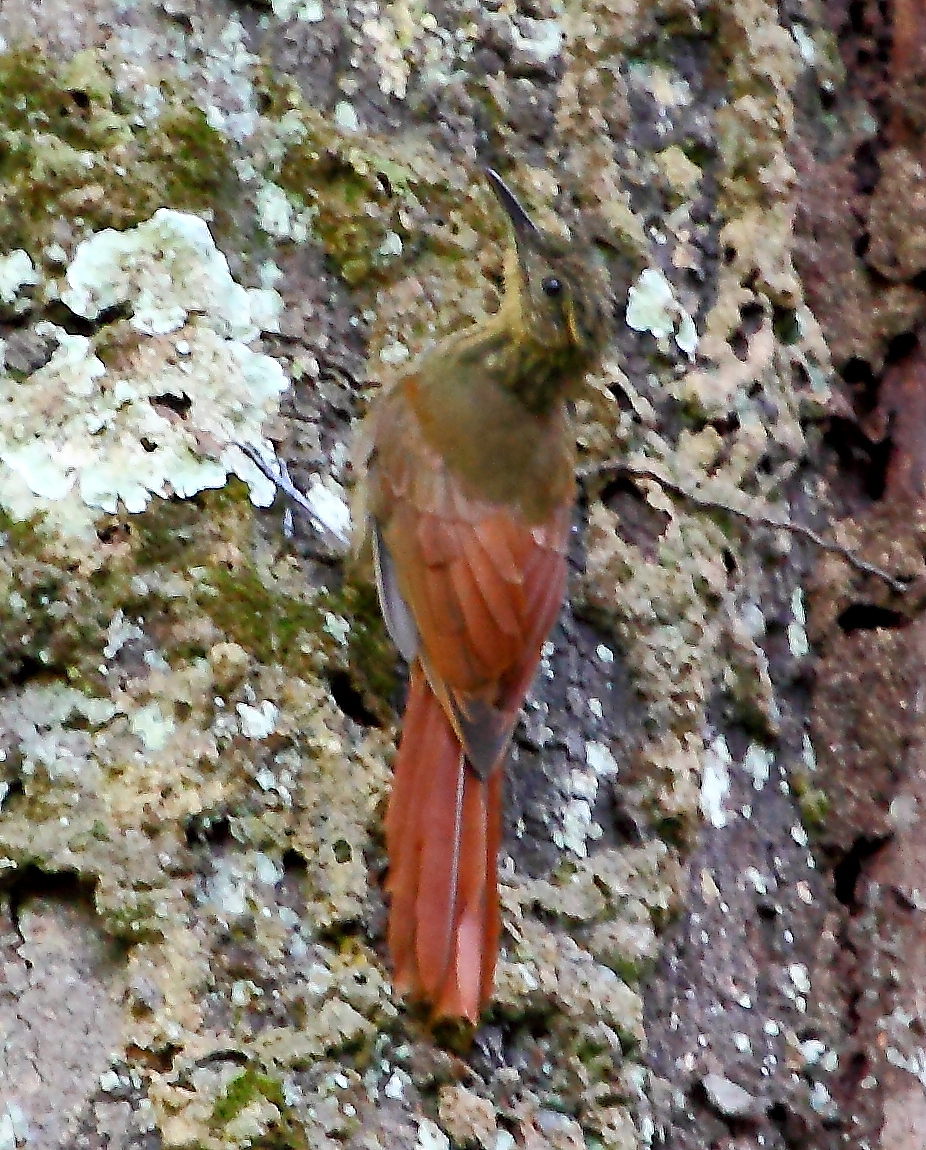
- at Presidente Figueiredo, Amazonas state, Brazil

Conservation status
- Least Concern (IUCN 3.1)

Scientific classification
- Kingdom: Animalia
- Phylum: Chordata
- Class: Aves
- Order: Passeriformes
- Family: Furnariidae
- Genus: Deconychura
- Species: D. longicauda

Binomial name
- Deconychura longicauda (Pelzeln, 1868)

= Whistling long-tailed woodcreeper =

Species of bird

The whistling long-tailed woodcreeper (Deconychura longicauda), also known as the northern long-tailed woodcreeper, is a species of bird in subfamily Dendrocolaptinae of the ovenbird family Furnariidae. It is found in Brazil, French Guiana, Guyana, and Suriname.

== Taxonomy ==
The whistling long-tailed woodcreeper was formally described in 1868 as Dendrocincla longicauda by the Austrian ornithologist August von Pelzeln based on specimens collected in northern Brazil. The specific epithet combines Latin longus meaning "long" with cauda meaning "tail". The whistling long-tailed woodcreeper is now placed in the genus Deconychura that was introduced in 1891 by the American naturalist George Kruck Cherrie. The species is monotypic: no subspecies are recognised..

The whistling long-tailed woodcreeper was formerly considered to be conspecific with what are now the piping long-tailed woodcreeper (D. typica) and the mournful long-tailed woodcreeper (D. pallida).

== Description ==
The whistling long-tailed woodcreeper is a medium-sized member of its subfamily, with a slim body, long wings and tail, and a slim medium-length straight bill. It is 16 to 21 cm (6.3 to 8.3 in) long and weighs about 22 to 36 g (0.78 to 1.3 oz). The male is longer and heavier than the female. The plumages of males and females are alike. Adults are mostly olive-brown with a darker crown and nape that have fine buff streaks. The lores and supercilium are whitish to rich buffy. The wings, uppertail coverts, and tail are rufous-chestnut; the primaries have dusky tips. The throat varies from whitish buff to ochraceous, the breast is olive-brown with buff streaks, the belly and flanks are plain olive-brown, and the undertail coverts are rufous. The underwing coverts and the underside of the flight feathers are cinnamon rufous. The iris is brown, the bill has a brownish maxilla and bluish mandible, and the legs and feet are brown. Juveniles are very similar to adults, with a slightly darker head and fewer pale streaks on the breast.

The song is "a high, distinctly descending, clear, rather plaintive 'pee-pue-tue-tuh---' ". The species can sing at any time of day, though it is most heard in early morning and late afternoon. It does not sing continuously. Playback of the local song elicits a strong response, so the song "likely has a territorial function".

== Distribution and habitat ==
The whistling long-tailed woodcreeper is found in the Guianas and in northern Brazil north of the Amazon River and east of the Rio Negro. It inhabits a variety of forested landscapes where it favors the interior of humid primary forest. It does occur at the forest edges and in mature secondary forest. It is mostly found in terra firme and várzea forest up to about 500 m (1,600 ft). It is a year-round resident throughout its range.

== Behavior ==
=== Feeding ===
The whistling long-tailed woodcreeper mostly forages from the understory to the canopy, about 3 to 20 m (10 to 66 ft) above the ground. It forages singly, in pairs, and in mixed-species feeding flocks; the composition of the last varies. It hitches up trunks and vines, mostly picking or gleaning its prey but sometimes making short sallies to capture it in the air. Its diet is not known in detail but is mostly arthropods, and it seems to favor adults rather than including significant numbers of larvae.

=== Breeding ===
Almost nothing is known about the northern long-tailed woodcreeper's breeding biology. The scant evidence indicates that its breeding season varies geographically.

== Conservation status ==
The IUCN has assessed the whistling long-tailed woodcreeper as being of Least Concern. It has a fairly large range but its population size is not known and is believed to be decreasing. Habitat modification and fragmentation for agriculture and ranching is cited as a threat. It is considered fairly common to common in much of its range but rare in Suriname. It occurs in several protected areas. "It appears to be highly sensitive to habitat modification and requires nearly continuous forest to persist."
