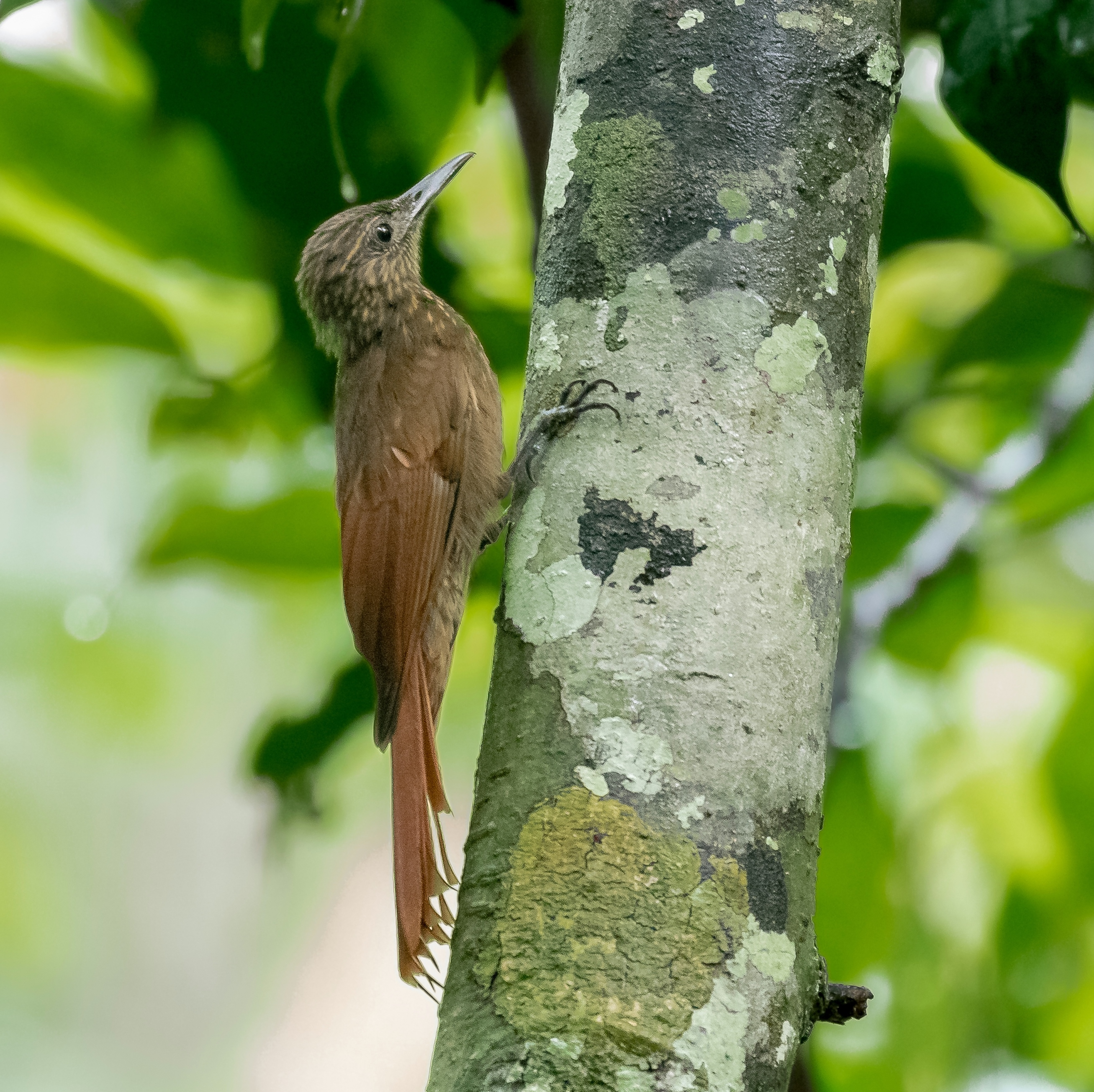

Scientific classification
- Kingdom: Animalia
- Phylum: Chordata
- Class: Aves
- Order: Passeriformes
- Family: Furnariidae
- Subfamily: Dendrocolaptinae
- Genus: Deconychura; Cherrie, 1891

Type species
- Deconychura typica Cherrie, 1891

= Deconychura =

Genus of birds

Deconychura is a genus of birds in the Dendrocolaptinae subfamily.

== Species ==
The genus contains the following species:

Image	Scientific name	Common name	Distribution
	Deconychura typica	Piping long-tailed woodcreeper	Costa Rica, Panama, and Colombia.
	Deconychura longicauda	Whistling long-tailed woodcreeper	the Guianas and northern Brazil.
	Deconychura pallida	Mournful long-tailed woodcreeper	Bolivia, Brazil, Colombia, Ecuador, Peru, and Venezuela.
