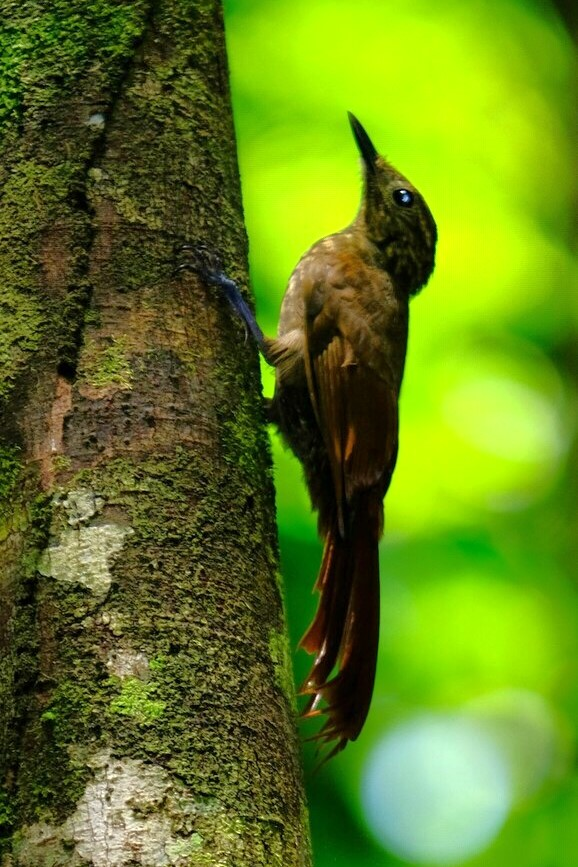

Conservation status
- Least Concern (IUCN 3.1)

Scientific classification
- Kingdom: Animalia
- Phylum: Chordata
- Class: Aves
- Order: Passeriformes
- Family: Furnariidae
- Genus: Deconychura
- Species: D. typica

Binomial name
- Deconychura typica Cherrie, 1891

= Piping long-tailed woodcreeper =

Species of bird

The piping long-tailed woodcreeper (Deconychura typica), also known as the little long-tailed woodcreeper, is a species of bird in subfamily Dendrocolaptinae of the ovenbird family Furnariidae. It is found from Costa Rica south to northern Colombia.

== Taxonomy ==
The piping long-tailed woodcreeper was formerly considered to be conspecific with what are now the whistling long-tailed woodcreeper (keeping D. longicauda) and the mournful long-tailed woodcreeper (D. pallida). BirdLife International's Handbook of the Birds of the World (HBW) has treated them separately since the 2010s, and the International Ornithological Committee (IOC) followed suit in July 2023. However, the North American and South American Classification Committees of the American Ornithological Society and the Clements taxonomy treat the long-tailed woodcreeper as one species. The AOS notes that it probably consists of at least two and possibly three species.

The IOC and HBW recognize these three subspecies; Clements groups them as "long-tailed woodcreeper (little)":

- D. t. typica Cherrie, 1891
- D. t. darienensis Griscom, 1929
- D. t. minor Todd, 1919

Subspecies D. l. minor intergrades with D. l. darienensis and there is some dispute as to the latter's validity.

== Description ==
The piping long-tailed woodcreeper is a medium-sized member of its subfamily, with a slim body, long wings and tail, and a slim medium-length straight bill. It is 16 to 21 cm (6.3 to 8.3 in) long and weighs about 22 to 26 g (0.78 to 0.92 oz). Males are longer and heavier than females, and both length and weight vary among the subspecies. The species' plumage varies only slightly among the subspecies and males and females are alike. Adults are mostly olive-brown with a darker crown and nape that have fine buff streaks. Their lores and supercilium are whitish to rich buffy. Their wings, uppertail coverts, and tail are rufous-chestnut; their primaries have dusky tips. Their throat varies from whitish buff to ochraceous, their breast is olive-brown with buff streaks, their belly and flanks are plain olive-brown, and their undertail coverts are rufous. Their underwing coverts and the underside of the flight feathers are cinnamon rufous. Their iris is brown, their bill is gray, and their legs and feet are gray. Juveniles are very similar to adults, with a slightly darker head and fewer pale streaks on the breast.

== Distribution ==
The subspecies of the piping long-tailed woodcreeper are found thus:

- D. l. typica, from Honduras through Nicaragua and Costa Rica into central Panama
- D. l. darienensis, eastern Panama and northwestern Colombia to the Magdalena River valley
- D. l. minor, north-central Colombia

The piping long-tailed woodcreeper inhabits a variety of forested landscapes where it favors the interior of humid primary forest. It does occur at the forest edges and in mature secondary forest. In Central America it is mostly a bird of the lowlands and foothills, where it ranges in elevation to about 400 m (1,300 ft) in Honduras, 1,000 m (3,300 ft) in Nicaragua, 1,200 m (3,900 ft) in Costa Rica, and 1,400 m (4,600 ft) in Panama. In Colombia it reaches 1,500 m (4,900 ft).

== Behavior ==
=== Movement ===
The piping long-tailed woodcreeper is mostly a year-round resident throughout its range though some elevational movements are suspected in Costa Rica.

=== Feeding ===
The piping long-tailed woodcreeper mostly forages from the understory to the canopy, about 3 to 20 m (10 to 66 ft) above the ground. It forages singly, in pairs, and in mixed-species feeding flocks; the composition of the last varies. It hitches up trunks and vines, mostly picking or gleaning its prey but sometimes making short sallies to capture it in the air. Its diet is not known in detail but is mostly arthropods, and it seems to favor adults rather than including significant numbers of larvae.

=== Breeding ===
Almost nothing is known about the piping long-tailed woodcreeper's breeding biology. The scant evidence indicates that its breeding season varies geographically. One clutch contained two eggs.

=== Vocalization ===
The piping long-tailed woodcreeper's song is "a long and fast series of short piping notes that first speeds up, becomes louder and rises slightly in pitch, then slows again whilst also decreasing in amplitude and pitch." It has been put into words as "weet!-weet!-WEEEET!-WEEEET!-WEEEET!-weet-weet-weet...". The species can sing at any time of day, though it is most heard in early morning and late afternoon. It does not sing continuously. Playback of the local song elicits a strong response, so the song "likely has a territorial function".

== Status ==
The IUCN has assessed the piping long-tailed woodcreeper as being of Least Concern. It has a fairly large range but its population size is not known and is believed to be decreasing. No immediate threats have been identified. It is considered uncommon and local in Central America, with few records in Honduras, Nicaragua, and most of Panama. Subspecies D. l. typicaand D. l. darienensis are found in several protected areas. However, "[i]t appears to be highly sensitive to habitat modification and requires nearly continuous forest to persist."
