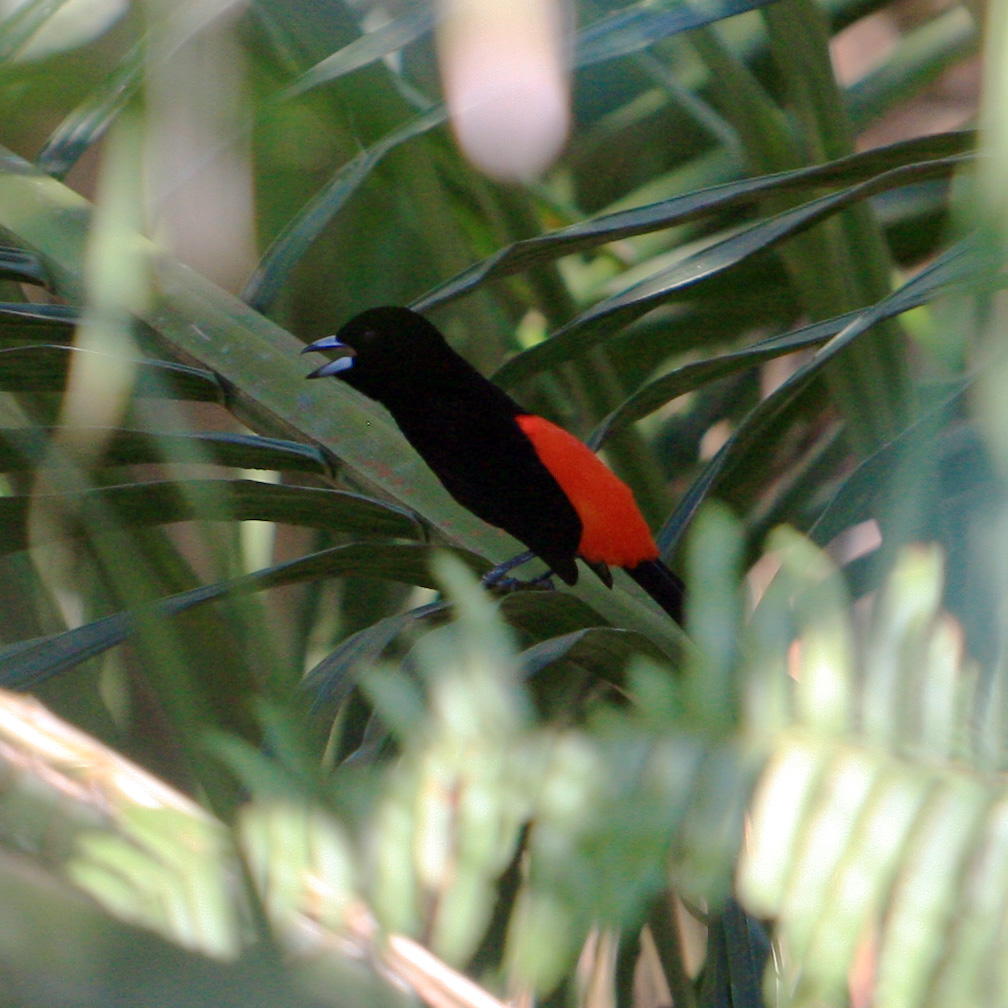
- Male in Costa Rica

Conservation status
- Least Concern (IUCN 3.1)

Scientific classification
- Kingdom: Animalia
- Phylum: Chordata
- Class: Aves
- Order: Passeriformes
- Family: Thraupidae
- Genus: Ramphocelus
- Species: R. passerinii
- Subspecies: R. p. costaricensis

Trinomial name
- Ramphocelus passerinii costaricensis Cherrie, 1891

= Cherrie's tanager =

Species of bird

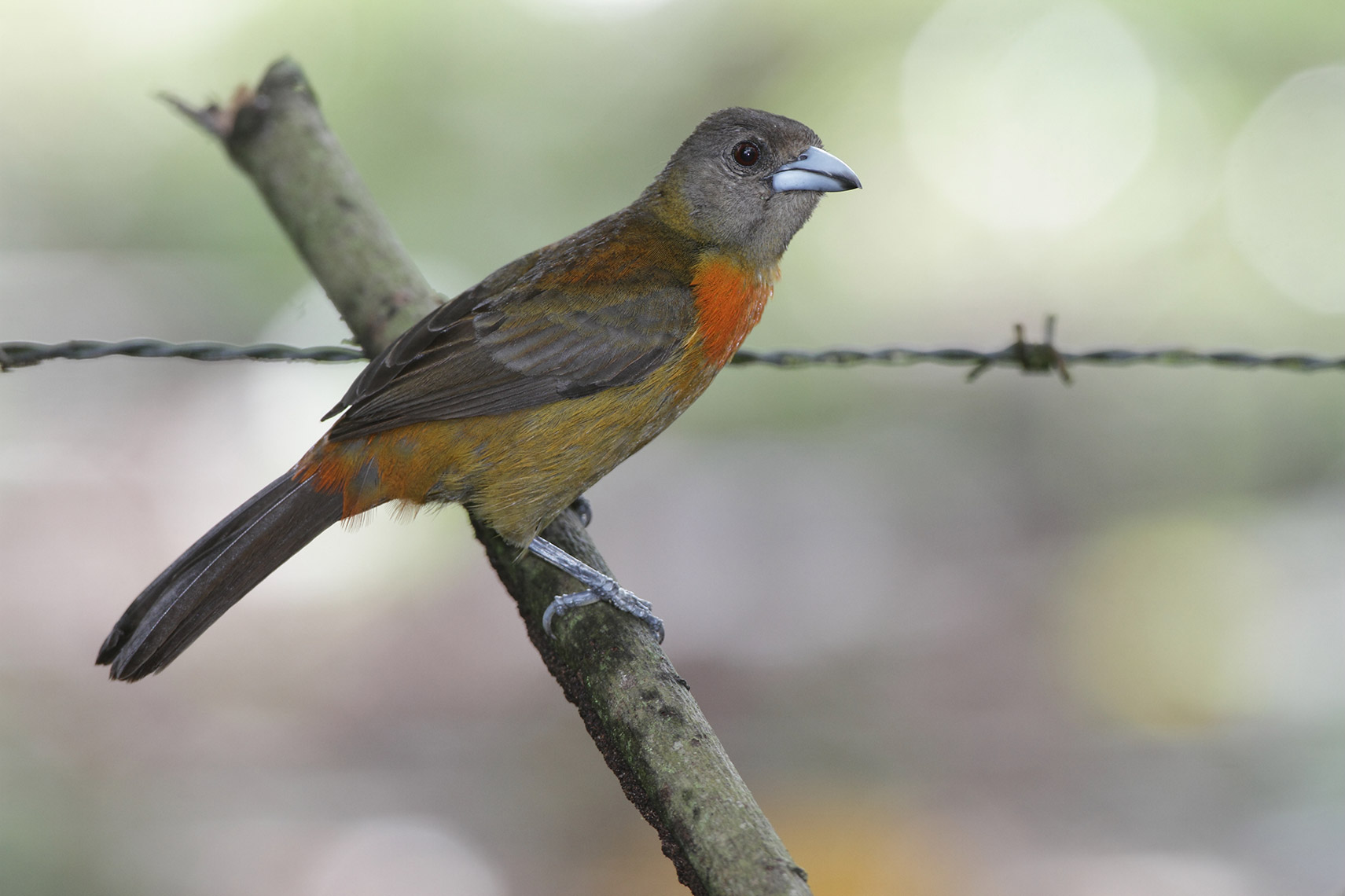
Female Cherrie's Tanager (Ramphocelus costaricensis), photo taken at Hacienda Baru reserve near Dominical, Costa Rica.

Cherrie's tanager (Ramphocelus passerinii costaricensis) is a medium-sized passerine bird. This tanager is a resident breeder in the Pacific lowlands of Costa Rica and western Panama. This bird was formerly known as the scarlet-rumped tanager, but was split as a separate species from the Caribbean form, which was itself renamed as Passerini's tanager, Ramphocelus passerinii. While most authorities had accepted this split, there were notable exceptions (e.g. the Howard and Moore checklist). It was lumped back into the Scarlet-rumped Tanager in 2018.

Cherrie's tanager is very common from sea level to 1,200 m (3,900 ft) altitude, and occurs occasionally up to 1,700 m (5,600 ft). The preferred habitat is semi-open areas including light second growth, woodland edges, gardens and pasture with bushes. The cup nest is built up to 6 m (20 ft) high in a tree. The normal clutch is two pale blue or grey eggs, marked with black, brown or lilac. This species will sometimes raise two broods in a season.

The adult Cherrie's tanager is 16 cm (6.3 in) long and weighs 31 g (1.1 oz). The adult male is mainly black except for a scarlet rump, silvery bill and dark red iris. The female has a grey head, olive upperparts, orange rump, brownish wings and tail, and ochre underparts with a broad orange breast band. The female plumage is the one that differs most from Passerini's tanager. Immatures resemble the adult female, but with a less orange breast.

Cherrie's tanagers occur in pairs, small groups, or as part of a mixed-species feeding flock, and up to a dozen birds may roost together in dense thickets at night. This species feeds on small fruit, usually swallowed whole, insects and spiders.

Cherrie's tanager's call is a sharp wac. Its song consists of a few clear pleasant notes, delivered in longer phrases than that of its Caribbean relative.

This bird is called Cherrie's tanager to honor the memory of American naturalist, explorer and adventurer George Cherrie. Dr. Cherrie accompanied former President Theodore Roosevelt in the famous 1913 exploration of the River of Doubt, in the Brazilian amazon basin, which was later named Rio Roosevelt.
