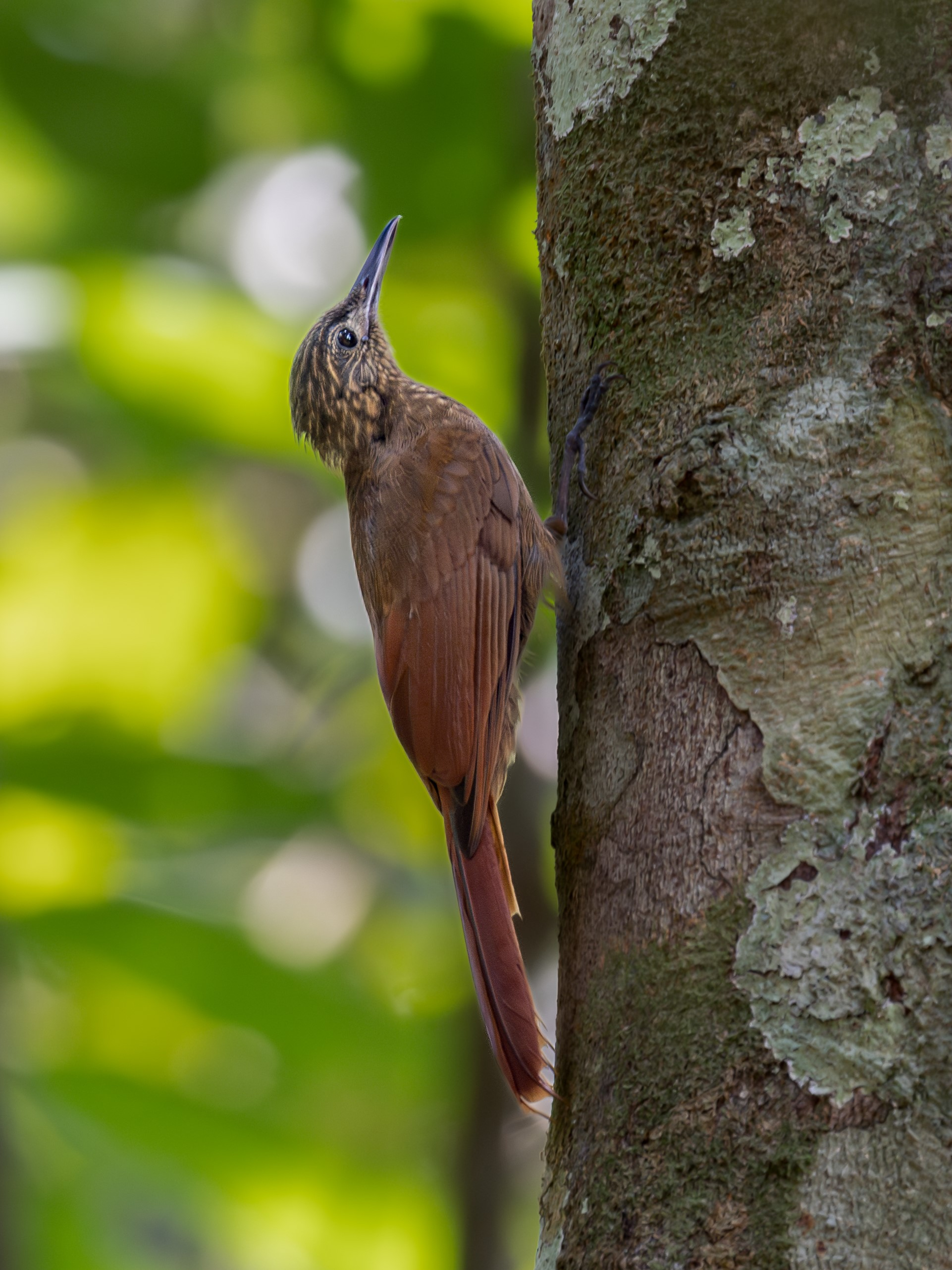
- at Novo Airão, Amazonas state, Brazil

Conservation status
- Least Concern (IUCN 3.1)

Scientific classification
- Kingdom: Animalia
- Phylum: Chordata
- Class: Aves
- Order: Passeriformes
- Family: Furnariidae
- Genus: Deconychura
- Species: D. pallida

Binomial name
- Deconychura pallida JT Zimmer, 1929

= Mournful long-tailed woodcreeper =

Species of bird

The mournful long-tailed woodcreeper (Deconychura pallida), also known as the southern long-tailed woodcreeper, is a species of bird in subfamily Dendrocolaptinae of the ovenbird family Furnariidae. It is found in Bolivia, Brazil, Colombia, Ecuador, Peru, and Venezuela.

== Taxonomy and systematics ==
The mournful long-tailed woodcreeper was formerly considered to be part of the former long-tailed woodcreeper (Deconychura longicauda) with what are now the northern long-tailed woodcreeper (keeping D. longicauda) and the little long-tailed woodcreeper (D. typica). BirdLife International's Handbook of the Birds of the World (HBW) has treated them separately since the 2010s, and the International Ornithological Committee (IOC) followed suit in July 2023. However, the North American and South American Classification Committees of the American Ornithological Society and the Clements taxonomy treat the long-tailed woodcreeper as one species. The AOS notes that it probably consists of at least two and possibly three species.

The IOC and HBW recognize these three subspecies; Clements groups them as "long-tailed woodcreeper (southern)":

- D. p. connectens Zimmer, JT, 1929
- D. p. pallida Zimmer, JT, 1929
- D. p. zimmeri Pinto, 1974

== Description ==
The mournful long-tailed woodcreeper is a medium-sized member of its subfamily, with a slim body, long wings and tail, and a slim medium-length straight bill. It is 16 to 21 cm (6.3 to 8.3 in) long and weighs about 24 to 32 g (0.85 to 1.1 oz). Males are longer and heavier than females, and both length and weight vary among the subspecies. The species' plumage varies only slightly among the subspecies and males and females are alike. Adults are mostly olive-brown with a darker crown and nape that have fine buff streaks. Their lores and supercilium are whitish to rich buffy. Their wings, uppertail coverts, and tail are rufous-chestnut; their primaries have dusky tips. Their throat varies from whitish buff to ochraceous, their breast is olive-brown with buff streaks, their belly and flanks are plain olive-brown, and their undertail coverts are rufous. Their underwing coverts and the underside of the flight feathers are cinnamon rufous. Their iris is brown, their bill is gray or black, and their legs and feet are gray or gray-black. Juveniles are very similar to adults, with a slightly darker head and fewer pale streaks on the breast.

== Distribution ==
The subspecies of the mournful long-tailed woodcreeper are found thus:

- D. p. connectens, the Amazon Basin north of the Amazon River from eastern Colombia and southern Venezuela south to eastern Ecuador, eastern Peru, and the upper Rio Negro basin of northwestern Brazil
- D. p. pallida, the Amazon Basin south of the Amazon River from southeastern Peru and northern Bolivia east across Brazil at least to the Rio Tapajós and possibly the Rio Tocantins
- D. p. zimmeri, Brazil south of the Amazon River from the Rio Tocantins (and possibly the Rio Tapajós) east to the Atlantic Ocean

The mournful long-tailed woodcreeper inhabits a variety of forested landscapes where it favors the interior of humid primary forest. It does occur at the forest edges and in mature secondary forest. In Amazonia it is mostly found in terra firme and várzea forest up to about 500 m (1,600 ft). In Colombia it reaches 1,500 m (4,900 ft), in Ecuador 1,700 m (5,600 ft), in Peru 1,500 m (4,900 ft), and in Bolivia 1,250 m (4,100 ft).

== Behavior ==
=== Movement ===
The mournful long-tailed woodcreeper is a year-round resident throughout its range.

=== Feeding ===
The mournful long-tailed woodcreeper mostly forages from the understory to the canopy, about 3 to 20 m (10 to 66 ft) above the ground. It forages singly, in pairs, and in mixed-species feeding flocks; the composition of the last varies. It hitches up trunks and vines, mostly picking or gleaning its prey but sometimes making short sallies to capture it in the air. Its diet is not known in detail but is mostly arthropods, and it seems to favor adults rather than including significant numbers of larvae.

=== Breeding ===
Almost nothing is known about the mournful long-tailed woodcreeper's breeding biology. The scant evidence indicates that its breeding season varies geographically.

=== Vocalization ===
The mournful long-tailed woodcreeper's song is "a clearly descending series of typically 6–8 mainly flat-pitched whistles" with up to 12 notes. The species can sing at any time of day, though it is most heard in early morning and late afternoon. It does not sing continuously. Playback of the local song elicits a strong response, so the song "likely has a territorial function".

== Conservation status ==
The IUCN has assessed the mournful long-tailed woodcreeper as Least Concern. It has a very large range, though its population size is not known and is believed to be decreasing. Continuing deforestation in the Amazon Basin, especially for cattle ranching and soy farming, is the principal threat. It is considered "generally uncommon to fairly common in eastern Colombia and southeastern Peru, fairly common to common in parts of Amazonian Brazil, but rare and local in Ecuador." All of the subspecies do occur in some protected areas.
