= Ninia espinali =

Conservation status
- Near Threatened (IUCN 3.1)

Scientific classification
- Kingdom: Animalia
- Phylum: Chordata
- Class: Reptilia
- Order: Squamata
- Suborder: Serpentes
- Family: Colubridae
- Genus: Ninia
- Species: N. espinali

Binomial name
- Ninia espinali McCranie & Wilson, 1995

Species of snake

Ninia espinali, Espinal's coffee snake, is a species of snake in the family Colubridae. The species is native to Honduras and El Salvador.
