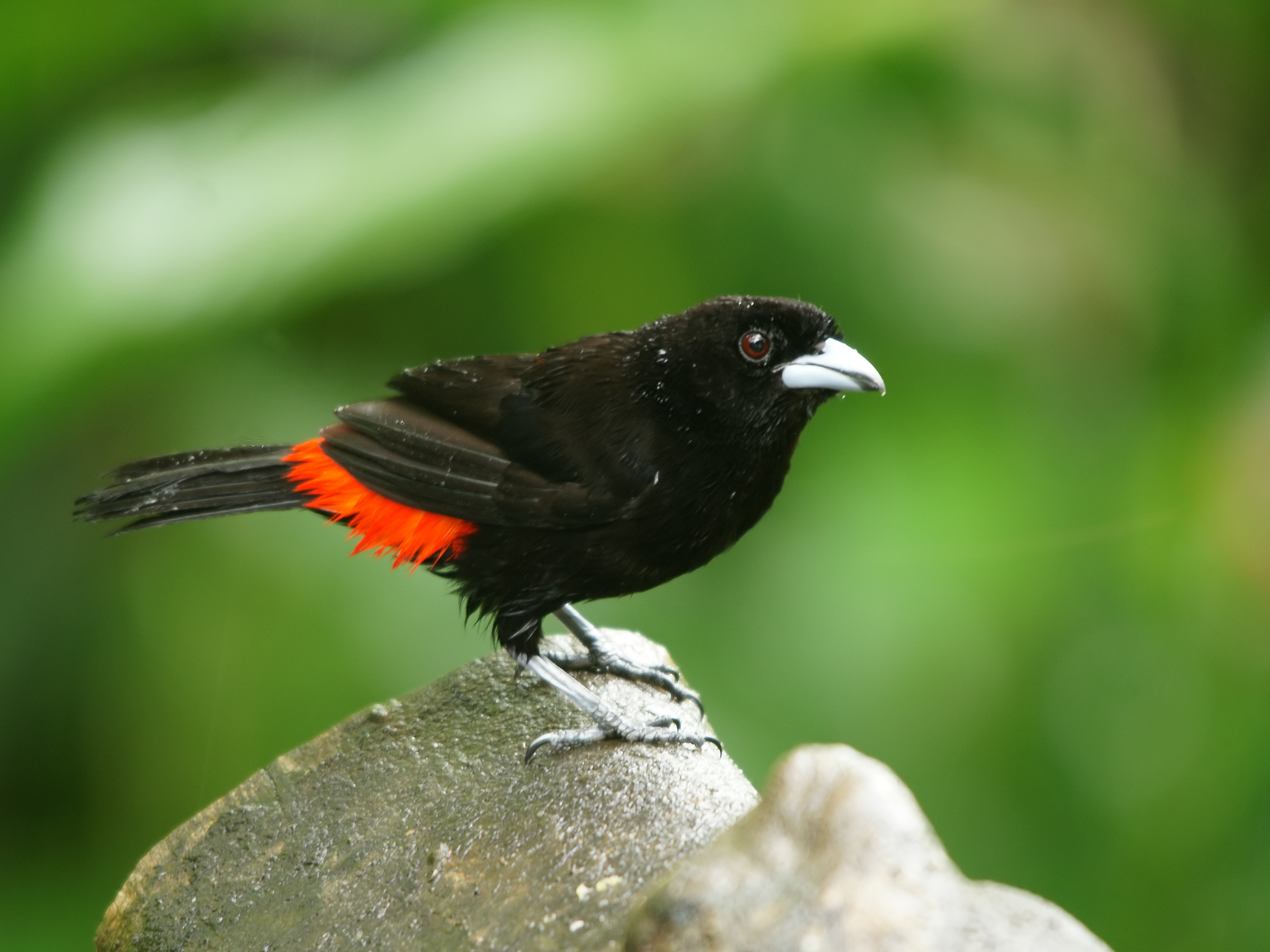
- Male

Conservation status
- Least Concern (IUCN 3.1)

Scientific classification
- Kingdom: Animalia
- Phylum: Chordata
- Class: Aves
- Order: Passeriformes
- Family: Thraupidae
- Genus: Ramphocelus
- Species: R. passerinii

Binomial name
- Ramphocelus passerinii Bonaparte, 1831

= Scarlet-rumped tanager =

Species of bird

The scarlet-rumped tanager (Ramphocelus passerinii) is a passerine bird in the family Thraupidae, the tanagers and allies. It is found from Mexico to Panama.

== Taxonomy and systematics ==
The scarlet-rumped tanager has a complicated taxonomic history. It was formally described by Charles Lucien Bonaparte in 1831 with its current binomial Ramphocelus passerinii. For much of the twentieth century it was assigned two subspecies, the nominate R. p. passerinii (Bonaparte) and R. p. costaricensis (Cherrie, 1891). Based on a 1996 publication, beginning in 1997 the two were split into "Passerini's tanager" (R. passerinii) and "Cherrie's tanager" (R. costaricensis). However, a study published in 2017 refuted their status as separate species and several taxonomic systems soon returned them to their pre-split status as subspecies of the scarlet-rumped tanager. BirdLife International's Handbook of the Birds of the World made the change in 2023.

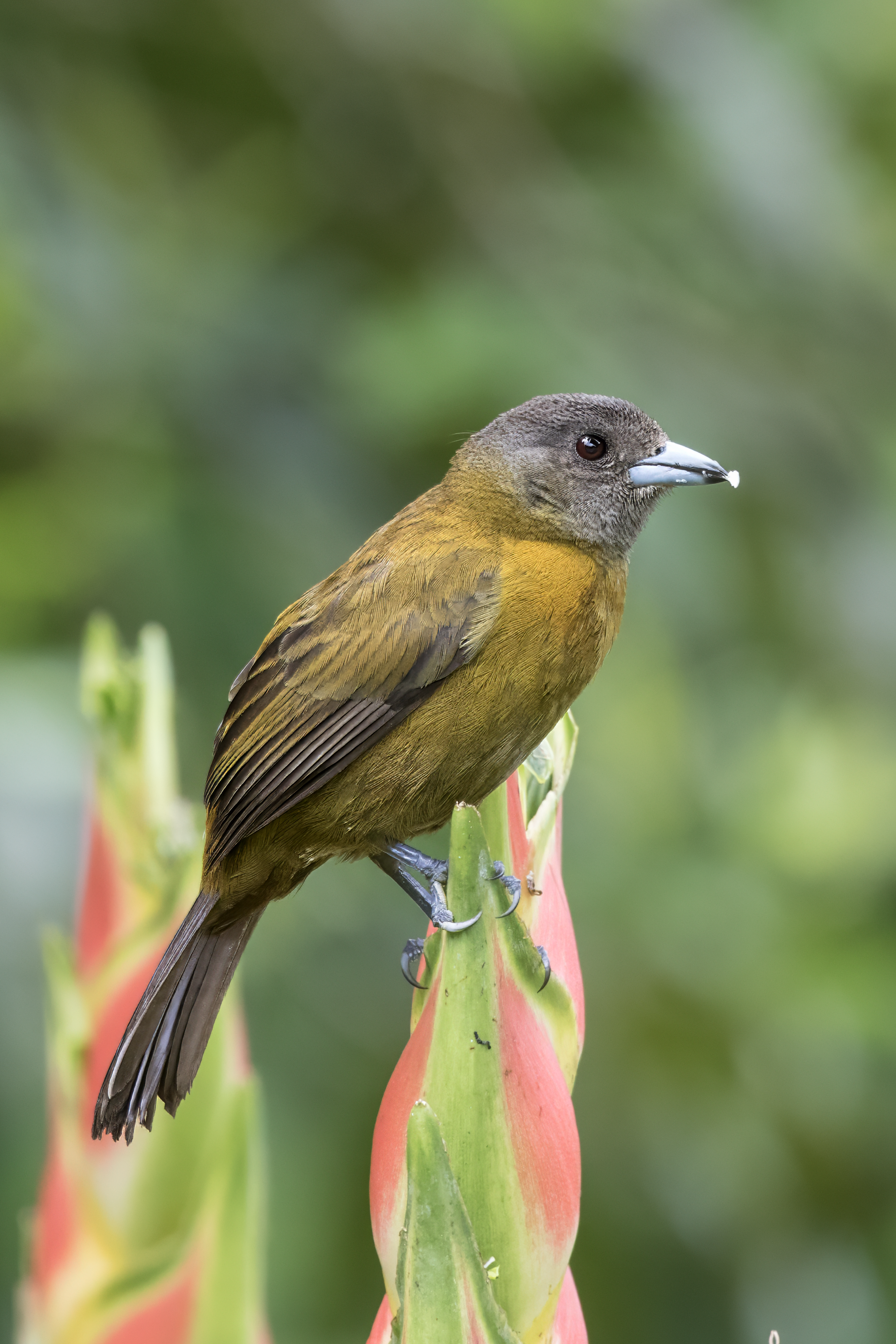
Female R. p. passerinii in Costa Rica

== Description ==
The scarlet-rumped tanager is about 15 to 17 cm (6 to 6.5 in) long and weighs 25.5 to 37.0 g (0.90 to 1.3 oz). The species is sexually dimorphic. Males of the nominate subspecies are almost entirely velvety black. Their lower back, rump, and uppertail coverts are scarlet or scarlet-orange with white bases on the feathers. Adult females have a brownish gray head. Their upperparts are olive-buff that is palest and brightest on the rump. Their wings and tail are dusky. Their throat is grayish buff. Their breast is bright olive-buff with a pale orange-green band across it. The rest of their underparts are a duller olive-buff. Males of subspecies R. p. costaricensis are essentially identical to nominate males. Females have a dark gray head. Their scapulars and back are dusky yellowish olive and their rump and uppertail coverts ochraceous-rufous. Their wings are dusky brownish black and their tail blackish. Their chin and throat are grayish, their breast ochraceous-rufous, and their belly and undertail coverts yellowish olive. Both sexes of both subspecies have a variable red to brown iris and a silvery blue bill with a black tip. Males have black legs and females' are plumbeous. Juveniles have a gray head, a pale throat, and yellowish gray upper- and underparts with a tawny wash.

== Distribution and habitat ==
The nominate subspecies of the scarlet-rumped tanager is the more northerly of the two. It is found from extreme southern Veracruz through Tabasco and northern Chiapas in southern Mexico across northern Guatemala and most of Belize and on the Caribbean slope across northern and eastern Honduras. Its range continues on that slope through Costa Rica into northwestern Panama's Bocas del Toro Province. Its range also extends from the Pacific slope east across northern Costa Rica. Subspecies R. p. costaricensis is found from central Puntarenas and western San Jose provinces in western Costa Rica south on the Pacific slope through Chiriquí to western Veraguas provinces in western Panama.

The scarlet-rumped tanager inhabits "Tropical Lowland Evergreen Forest Edge, Secondary Forest, [and] Second-growth Scrub" [capitals in original] in the tropical and lower subtropical zones. It also occurs in other somewhat open landscapes such as plantations, roadsides, river and stream shorelines, and overgrown pastures and agricultural fields. Sources differ on its upper elevational limit. One says it is 1,700 m (5,600 ft), another says 1,300 m (4,300 ft), and a third says it locally reaches 1,800 m (5,900 ft) in Costa Rica and Panama. It reaches only 850 m (2,800 ft) in Mexico and 1,400 m (4,600 ft) in Nicaragua. It reaches 1,200 m (3,900 ft) in Guatemala, Honduras, and eastern Costa Rica and 1,800 m (5,900 ft) in western Costa Rica.

== Behavior ==
=== Movement ===
The scarlet-rumped tanager is a year-round resident.

=== Feeding ===
The scarlet-rumped tanager feeds on a wide variety of fruits and insects, though it seems to favor the berries of Melastomaceae species. They take insects from foliage and sometimes in grassy areas, and also capture winged termites in mid-air. They take wild fruits from the plants and also eat bananas and plantain at feeding stations. They often forage in same-species flocks of about a dozen individuals. Though they apparently do not join mixed-species feeding flocks they may share a fruiting tree with other species.

=== Breeding ===
The scarlet-rumped tanager's breeding season has not been fully defined. It spans at least April to July in Nicaragua and March to September in Costa Rica. The nest is an open cup made from a wide variety of plant material. Nests are built in bushes, small trees, clumps of grass or ferns, and many other substrates. Most are near the ground but they have been found as high as 6 m (20 ft) above it. The clutch is usually one or two eggs though a few nests with three have been found. The eggs are highly variable even within a single clutch; their base color can be whitish, pale blue, or pale gray with black, brown, or lilac markings. The female alone incubates, usually for 11 or 12 days and rarely 13. Fledging occurs 11 to 12 days after hatch and both parents provision nestlings. In one study, two of 35 nests each held two eggs of the brood parasite bronzed cowbird (Molothrus aeneus).

=== Vocalization ===
The scarlet-rumped tanager's songs are highly variable both between and within the subspecies. However, "males of each taxon responded almost equally strongly to playback of songs of both subspecies", which was a major part of the evidence for treating it as a single species. A song of the nominate subspecies has been described as "a series of high-pitched whistles, tseet-tseeu-sip-sip-tessu-seep'seu...". One call is "a harsh chatter chiv'chiv'chiv'chiv'chiv...". Other calls include "a harsh, mostly moderate and low-pitched ik, wak, or wah...a sharp dry pzzt, pzzt-weet, or hist!...zweet, zzt-not, chee [and] churry churry churry".

== Status ==
The IUCN has assessed the scarlet-rumped tanager as being of Least Concern. It has a very large range; its estimated population of at least 500,000 mature individuals is believed to be increasing. No immediate threats have been identified. It is considered "common to frequent" across its range, "fairly common" in northern Central America and eastern Costa Rica, and "very common" in western Costa Rica. "Although there have been no detailed studies, the apparent propensity of Scarlet-rumped Tanager to thrive in aeras of second growth may work to the species’ benefit in the face of human habitat alteration, perhaps even facilitating the colonization of new areas."
