= Albertus Seba =

Dutch pharmacist, zoologist, and collector

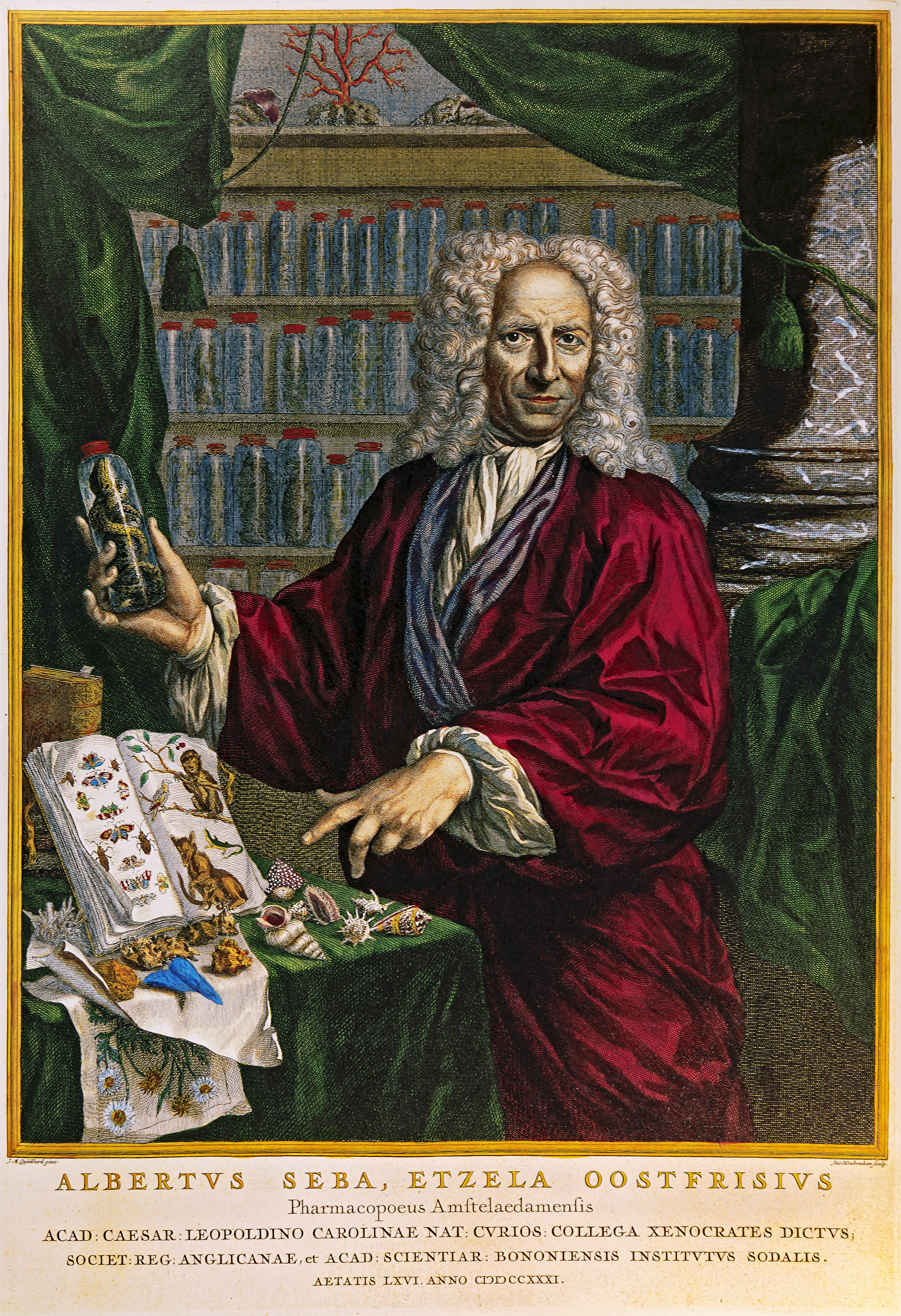
Albertus Seba showing a lizard in a bottle

Albertus or Albert Seba (May 12, 1665, Etzel near Friedeburg – May 2, 1736, Amsterdam) was a Dutch pharmacist, zoologist, and collector. Seba accumulated one of the largest cabinets of curiosities in the Netherlands during his time. He sold one of his cabinets in 1717 to Peter the Great of Russia. His later collections were auctioned after his death. He published descriptions of his collections in a lavishly illustrated 4-volume Thesaurus. His early work on taxonomy and natural history influenced Linnaeus.

== Career ==
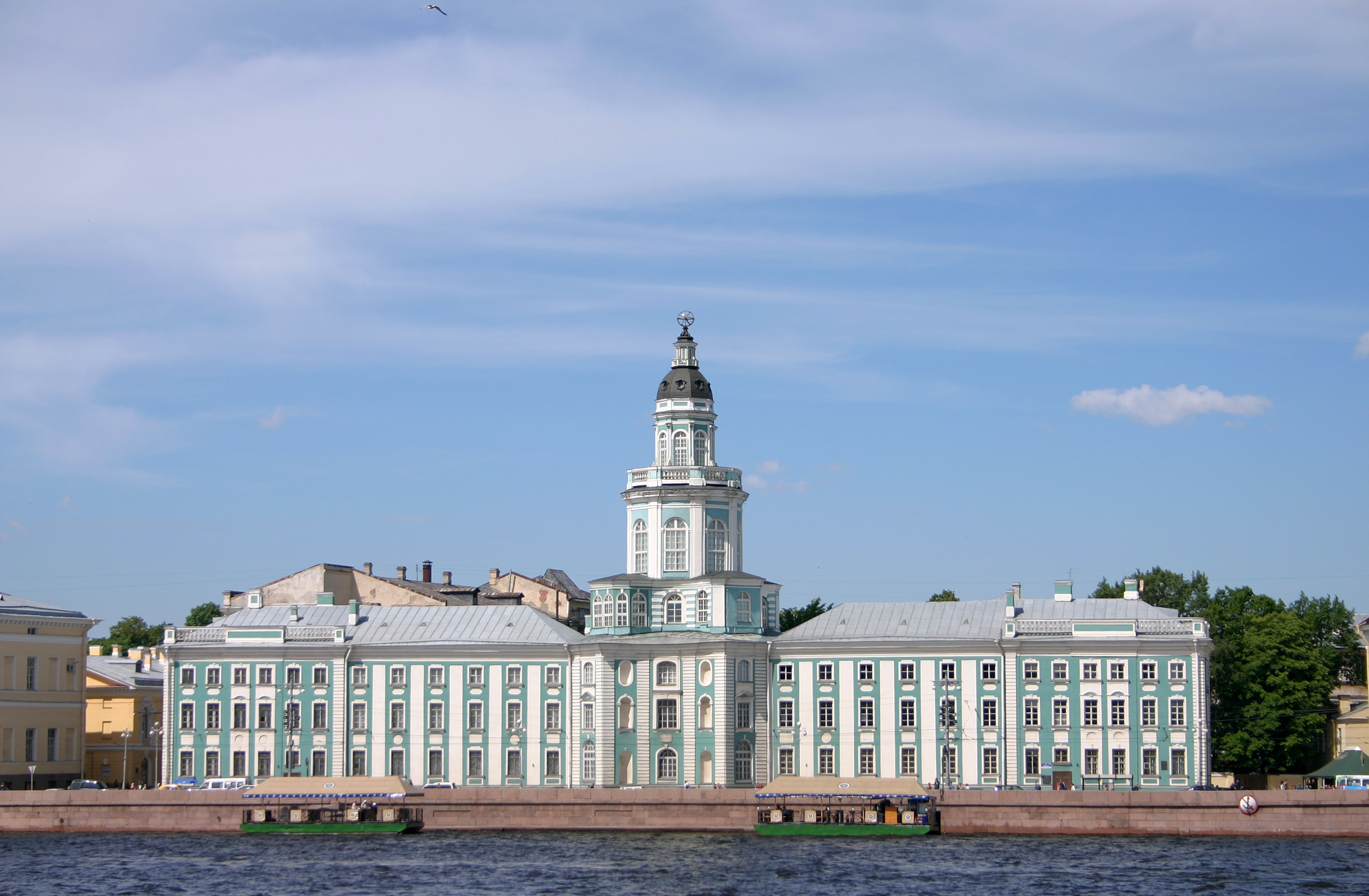
View of the Kunstkamera across the Neva.

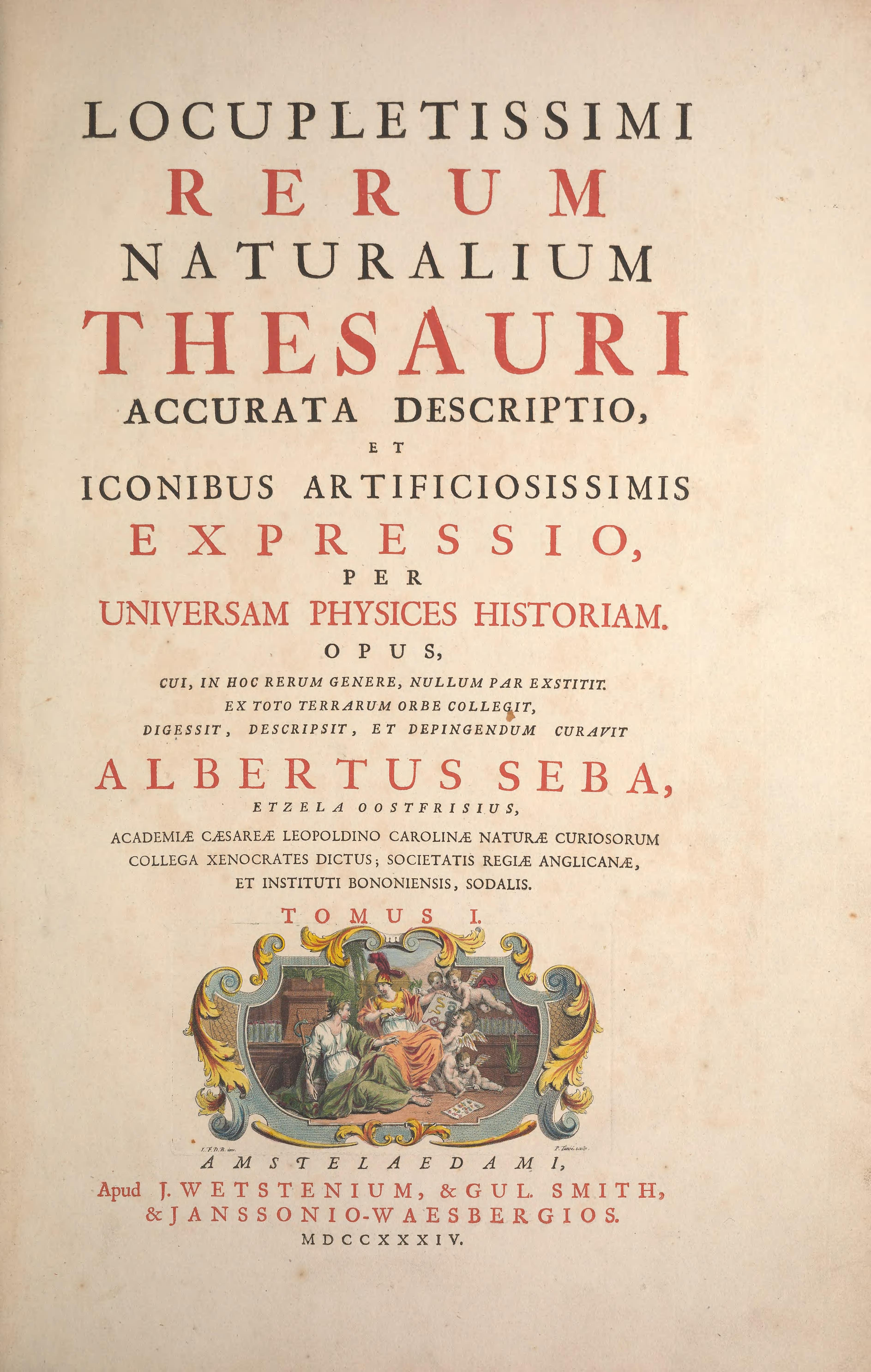
Title page of the Rerum Naturalium Thesaurus Vol. I

Born in Etzel, Seba moved to Amsterdam as an apprentice and, around 1700, opened a pharmacy near the harbour. Seba asked sailors and ship surgeons to bring exotic plants and animal products he could use for preparing drugs. Seba also started to collect snakes, birds, insects, shells, and lizards in his house.

From 1711, he delivered various medicines to the Russian court in Saint Petersburg and sometimes accepted fresh ginger as payment. Seba promoted his collection to Robert Erskine (1674–1719), the tsar's head physician, and in early 1716 Peter the Great bought the complete collection. In the following several years, Seba managed to develop another collection of natural specimens, which grew more extensive than the first.

Through Seba, Frederik Ruysch—a well-known Amsterdam physician and anatomist—also sold his collection to the tsar. Both collections so expanded Peter's imperial cabinet of curiosities that they led to the establishment of the Russian Academy of Sciences and the construction of a new building for the Kunstkammer, opened in 1728 as the first Russian public museum.

In October 1728, Seba had become a Fellow of the Royal Society. In 1734, he had published a Latin "treasury" (thesaurus) of animal specimens with beautiful engravings. Its full title was Locupletissimi Rerum Naturalium Thesauri Accurata Descriptio et Iconibus Artificiosissimus Expressio per Universam Physices Historiam ("A Careful Description and Exceedingly Artistic Expression in Pictures of the Exceedingly Rich Treasury of Nature Throughout the Entire History of Natural Science"), traditionally shortened and abbreviated in Latin as the Rerum Naturalium Thesaurus ("A Treasury of Nature") or as Seba's Thesaurus. A traditional English version of the name has been A Cabinet of Natural Curiosities, after the early modern cabinets of curiosities. The last two of the four volumes were published after his death (1759 and 1765). Today, an original 446-plate volume is in the collection of the Koninklijke Bibliotheek in The Hague, Netherlands. Recently, a complete example of the Thesaurus sold for $460,000 at an auction. In 2001, Taschen Books published a reprint of the Thesaurus, with a second printing in 2006.

In 1735, Carl Linnaeus visited Seba twice. Linnaeus found Seba's collection to be useful for the classification system which Linnaeus was developing, and Linnaeus used many of Seba's specimens as holotypes for original descriptions of species. Seba's inclusion of fantastic beasts such as the hydra influenced Linnaeus to include the "Paradoxa", species which may exist but which have not been found, in his Systema Naturae.

Seba himself did not use Linnaeus' taxonomy, as it was published only a year before his death. However, he did organize his Thesaurus by physical similarities, leading to some similarities with Linnaeus' larger project.

In 1752, several years after Seba's death, his second collection was auctioned in Amsterdam. Several objects were purchased by Russia's Academy of Sciences.

== Taxa named in honor of Seba ==
Seba is commemorated in the scientific names of two species and one subspecies of snakes: Ninia sebae, Python sebae, and Oxyrhopus petola sebae.

== Gallery ==
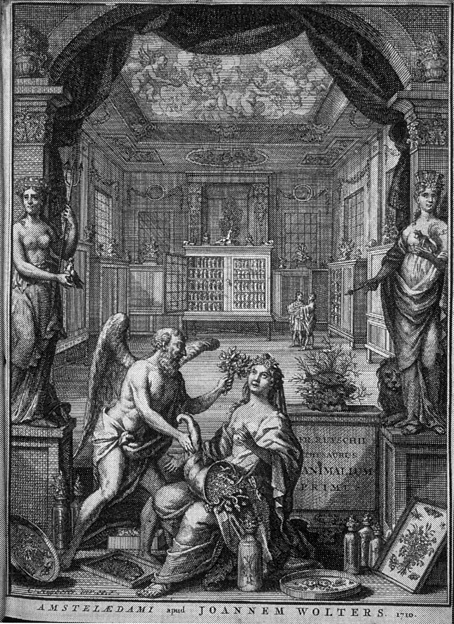
Frontispiece of Seba's Thesaurus, referencing Frederik Ruysch's earlier 1710 Thesaurus Animalium Primus

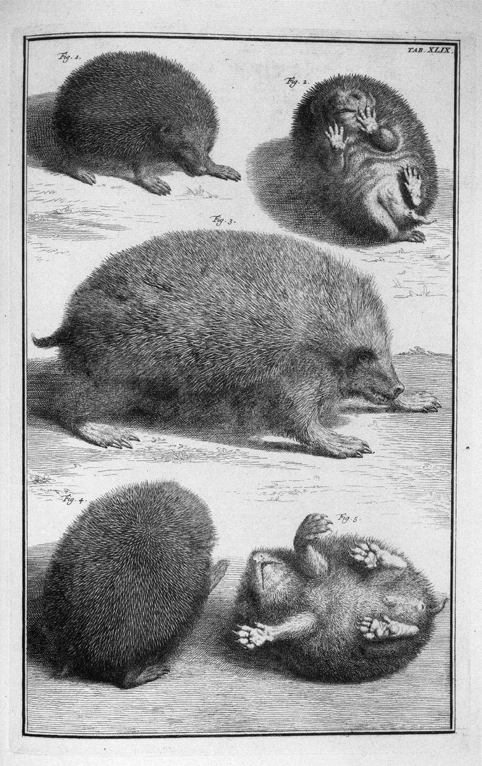
Engraving depicting different views of the hedgehog in the Thesaurus

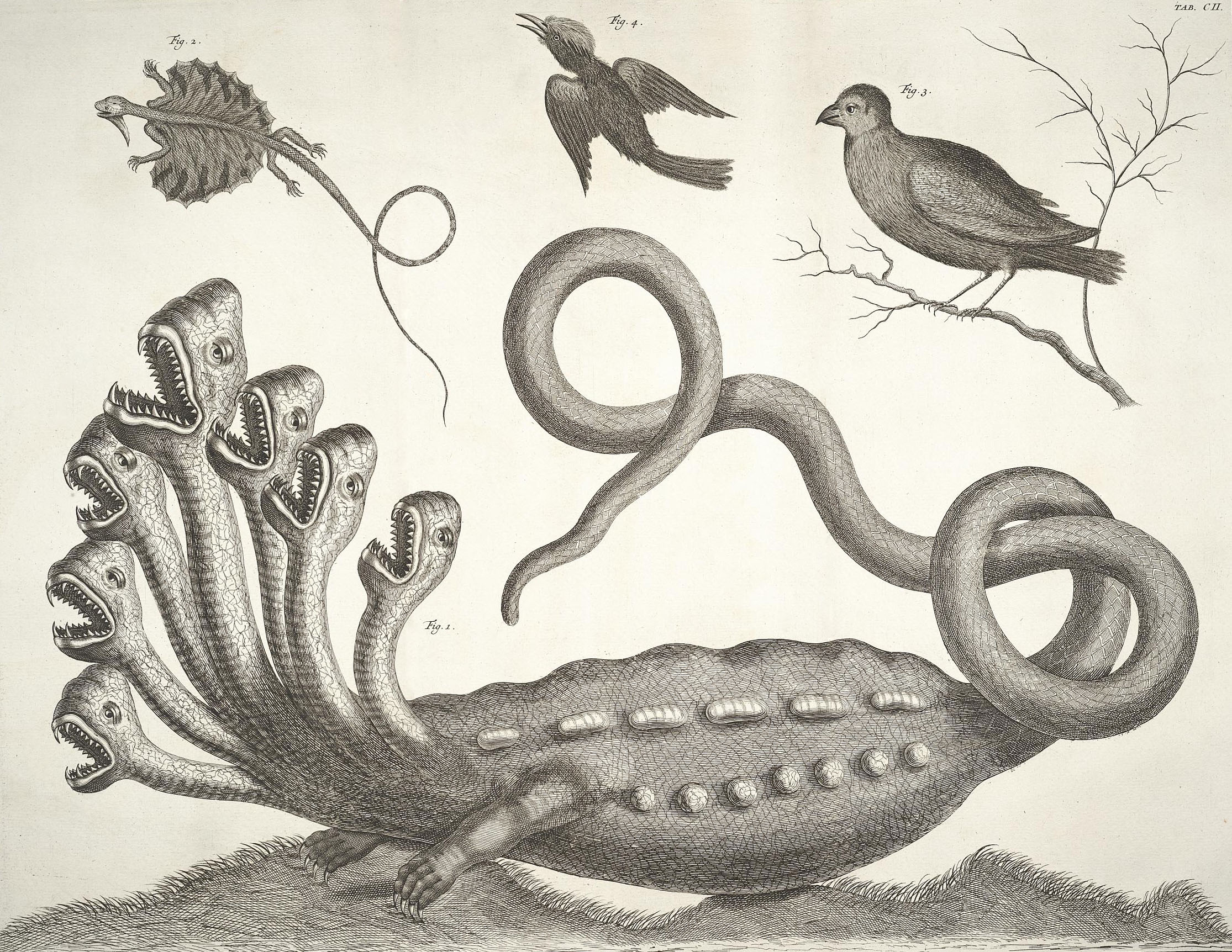
The Hamburg Hydra, from the 1st volume (1734)
