= Ninia psephota =

Conservation status
- Least Concern (IUCN 3.1)

Scientific classification
- Kingdom: Animalia
- Phylum: Chordata
- Class: Reptilia
- Order: Squamata
- Suborder: Serpentes
- Family: Colubridae
- Genus: Ninia
- Species: N. psephota

Binomial name
- Ninia psephota (Cope, 1875)

Synonyms
- Catostoma psephotum Cope, 1875

Species of snake

Ninia psephota, the red-bellied coffee snake or Cope's coffee snake , is a species of snake in the family Colubridae. The species is native to Panama and Costa Rica.
