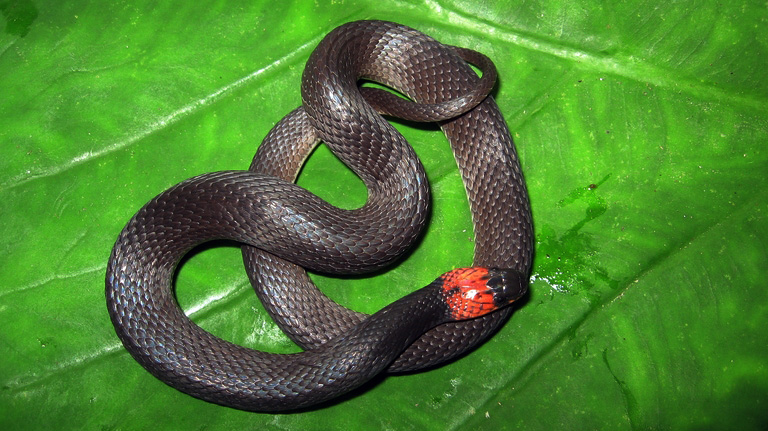

Conservation status
- Least Concern (IUCN 3.1)

Scientific classification
- Kingdom: Animalia
- Phylum: Chordata
- Class: Reptilia
- Order: Squamata
- Suborder: Serpentes
- Family: Colubridae
- Genus: Ninia
- Species: N. atrata

Binomial name
- Ninia atrata (Hallowell, 1848)

Synonyms
- Coluber atratus Hallowell, 1845; Ninia atrata — Cope, 1860; Streptophorus atratus — Boulenger, 1893; Ninia atrata — J. Peters & Orejas-Miranda, 1970

= Ninia atrata =

Species of snake

Ninia atrata, known commonly as Hallowell's coffee snake, Hallowell's earth snake, the red-nape snake, and the South American coffee snake, is a species of small terrestrial snake in the family Colubridae. The species is native to southern Central America and northern South America.

== Geographic range ==
N. atrata is found in Colombia, Ecuador, Panama, Trinidad and Tobago, and Venezuela.

== Habitat ==
The preferred natural habitats of N. atrata are forest and savanna, at altitudes from sea level to 1,000 m (3,280 ft).

== Diet ==
N. atrata is believed to feed on insect larvae, termites and slugs.

== Reproduction ==
N. atrata is oviparous.
