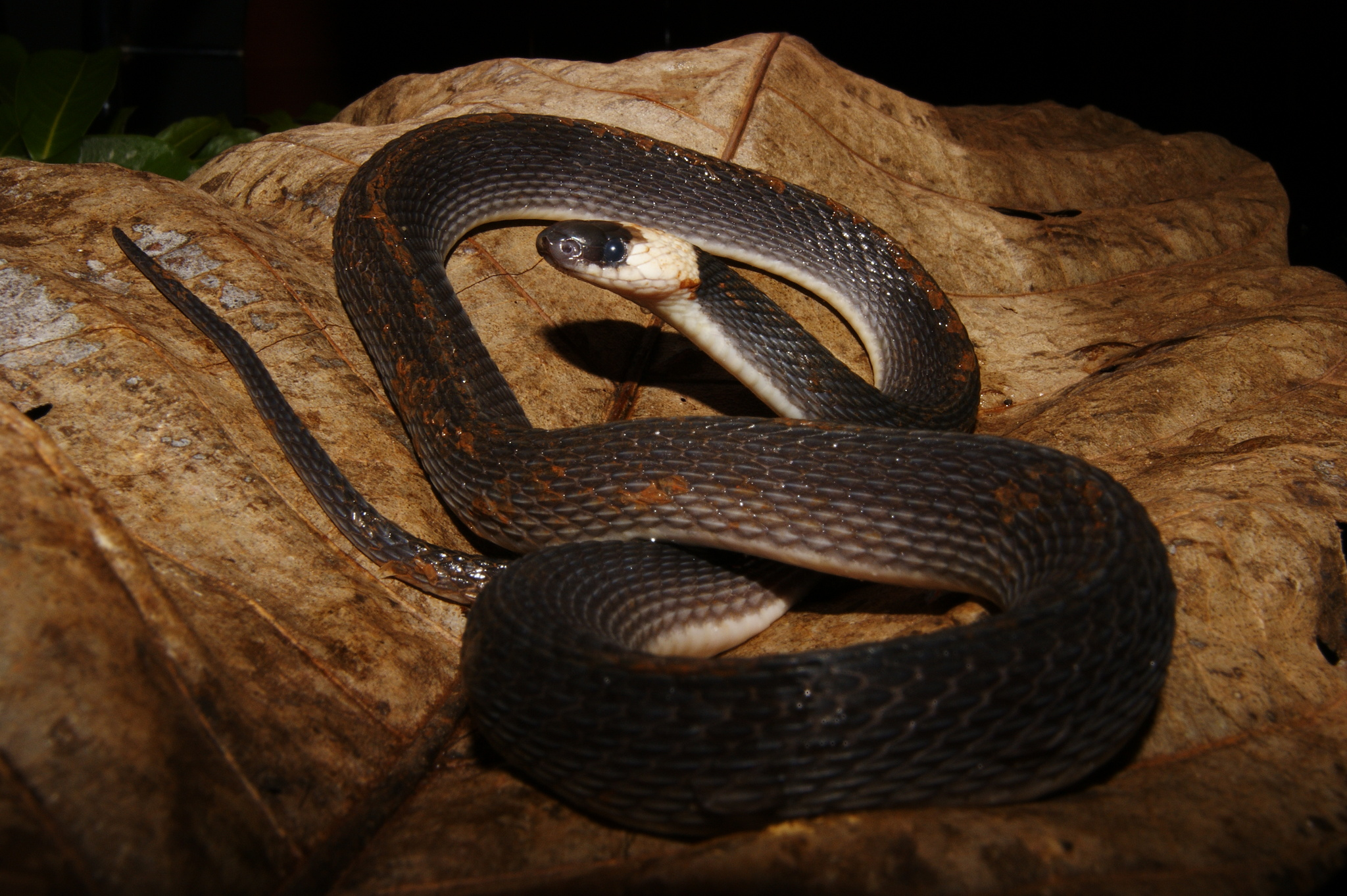

Conservation status
- Least Concern (IUCN 3.1)

Scientific classification
- Kingdom: Animalia
- Phylum: Chordata
- Class: Reptilia
- Order: Squamata
- Suborder: Serpentes
- Family: Colubridae
- Genus: Ninia
- Species: N. hudsoni

Binomial name
- Ninia hudsoni H. Parker, 1940

= Ninia hudsoni =

Species of snake

Ninia hudsoni, also known commonly as the Guyana coffee snake and Hudson's coffee snake, is a species of snake in the family Colubridae. The species is native to northwestern South America.

== Etymology ==
The specific name, hudsoni, is in honor of Mr. C.A. Hudson who collected the holotype of this species, as well as many entomological specimens, for the British Museum (Natural History).

== Geographic range ==
N. hudsoni is found in Brazil, Colombia, Ecuador, Guyana, and Peru.

== Habitat ==
The preferred natural habitat of N. hudsoni is forest, at altitudes of 200–1,300 m (660–4,270 ft).

== Description ==
A small snake species, N. hudsoni may attain a total length (including tail) of about 42 cm (17 in).

== Behavior ==
N. hudsoni is terrestrial, living in the leaf litter of the forest.

== Reproduction ==
N. hudsoni is oviparous.
