= Ninia diademata =

Conservation status
- Least Concern (IUCN 3.1)

Scientific classification
- Kingdom: Animalia
- Phylum: Chordata
- Class: Reptilia
- Order: Squamata
- Suborder: Serpentes
- Family: Colubridae
- Genus: Ninia
- Species: N. diademata

Binomial name
- Ninia diademata Baird & Girard, 1853

Species of snake

Ninia diademata, the ringneck coffee snake, is a species of snake in the family Colubridae. The species is native to Mexico, Belize, Guatemala, and Honduras.
