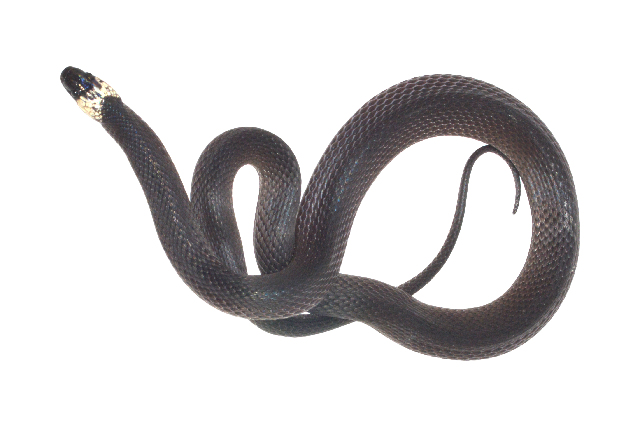

Scientific classification
- Kingdom: Animalia
- Phylum: Chordata
- Class: Reptilia
- Order: Squamata
- Suborder: Serpentes
- Family: Colubridae
- Genus: Ninia
- Species: N. teresitae

Binomial name
- Ninia teresitae Angarita-Sierra & Lynch, 2017

= Ninia teresitae =

Species of snake

Ninia teresitae is a species of snake in the family Colubridae. The species is native to Ecuador and Colombia.
