= Ninia pavimentata =

Conservation status
- Least Concern (IUCN 3.1)

Scientific classification
- Kingdom: Animalia
- Phylum: Chordata
- Class: Reptilia
- Order: Squamata
- Suborder: Serpentes
- Family: Colubridae
- Genus: Ninia
- Species: N. pavimentata

Binomial name
- Ninia pavimentata (Bocourt, 1883)

Synonyms
- Streptophorus maculatus ssp. pavimentatus Bocourt, 1883

Species of snake

Ninia pavimentata, the northern banded coffee snake, is a species of snake in the family Colubridae. The species is native to Guatemala and Honduras.
