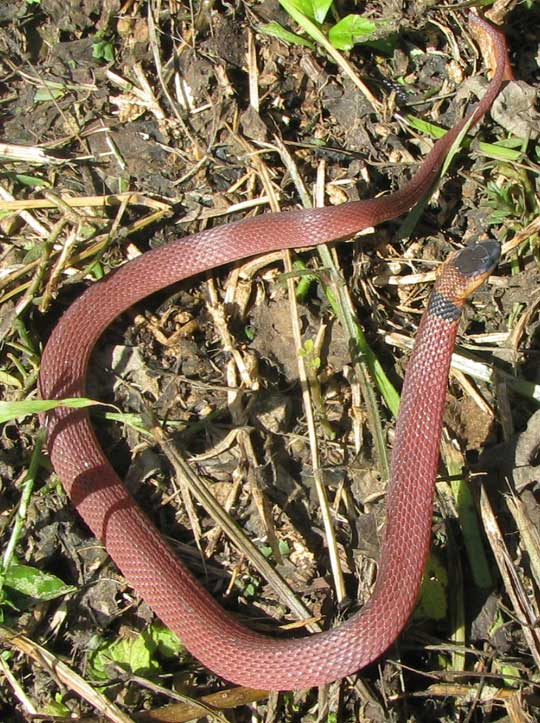

Conservation status
- Least Concern (IUCN 3.1)

Scientific classification
- Kingdom: Animalia
- Phylum: Chordata
- Class: Reptilia
- Order: Squamata
- Suborder: Serpentes
- Family: Colubridae
- Genus: Ninia
- Species: N. sebae

Binomial name
- Ninia sebae (A.M.C. Duméril, Bibron & A.H.A. Duméril, 1854)
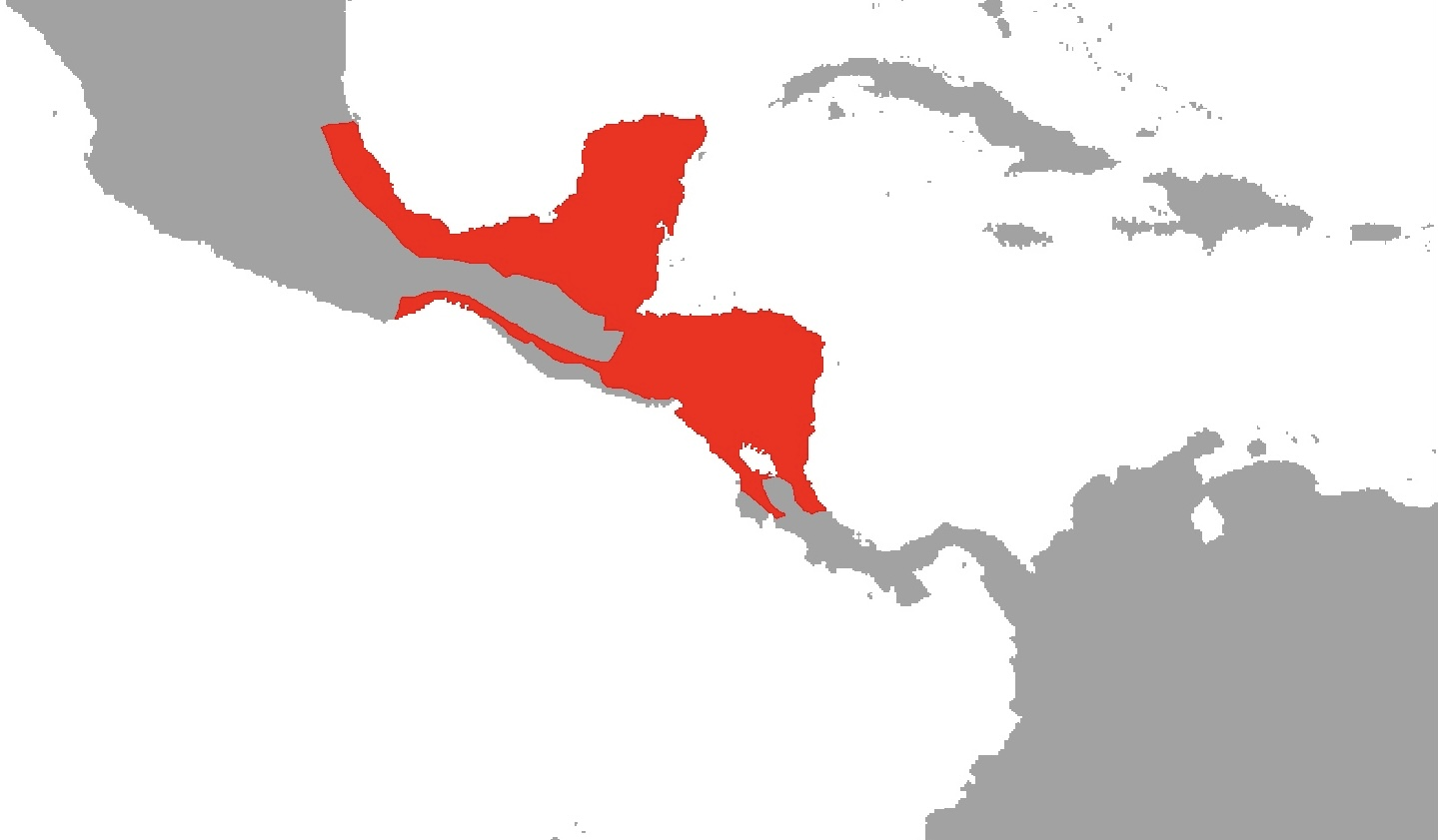

Synonyms
- Streptophorus sebae A.M.C. Duméril, Bibron & A.H.A. Duméril, 1854; Ninia sebae — Garman, 1884

= Ninia sebae =

Species of snake

Ninia sebae, commonly known as the redback coffee snake or the red coffee snake, is a species of small terrestrial snake in the family Colubridae. The species is native to southeastern Mexico and Central America south to Costa Rica. Although it resembles some venomous coral snakes in color and size, it is not venomous and rarely bites humans.

== Etymology ==
The specific name, sebae, is in honor of Dutch naturalist Albertus Seba.

== Subspecies ==
Four subspecies are recognized as being valid, including the nominotypical subspecies.

- Ninia sebae immaculata Schmidt & Rand, 1957
- Ninia sebae morleyi Schmidt & Andrews, 1936
- Ninia sebae punctulata (Bocourt, 1883)
- Ninia sebae sebae (A.M.C. Duméril, Bibron & A.H.A. Duméril, 1854)

Nota bene: A trinomial authority in parentheses indicates that the subspecies was originally described in a genus other than Ninia.

== Habitat ==
The preferred natural habitats of N. sebae are forest and savanna, at altitudes from sea level to 2,200 m (7,200 ft).

== Behavior ==
Coffee snakes (species in the genus Ninia) are thought to rely on concealment, flight and intimidation to avoid predation. These snakes were observed either flattening their entire bodies when alarmed, or remaining motionless in whatever position they were discovered. In a more recent study these snakes, when touched, displayed a flattened head and neck, and raised their anterior third or half.

== Diet ==
N. sebae preys upon earthworms, slugs, small land snails, and caecilians.

== Reproduction ==
N. sebae is oviparous.
