= Ninia franciscoi =

Conservation status
- Data Deficient (IUCN 3.1)

Scientific classification
- Kingdom: Animalia
- Phylum: Chordata
- Class: Reptilia
- Order: Squamata
- Suborder: Serpentes
- Family: Colubridae
- Genus: Ninia
- Species: N. franciscoi

Binomial name
- Ninia franciscoi Angarita-Sierra, 2014

Species of snake

Ninia franciscoi, the Simla coffee snake, is a species of snake in the family Colubridae. The species is native to Trinidad.
