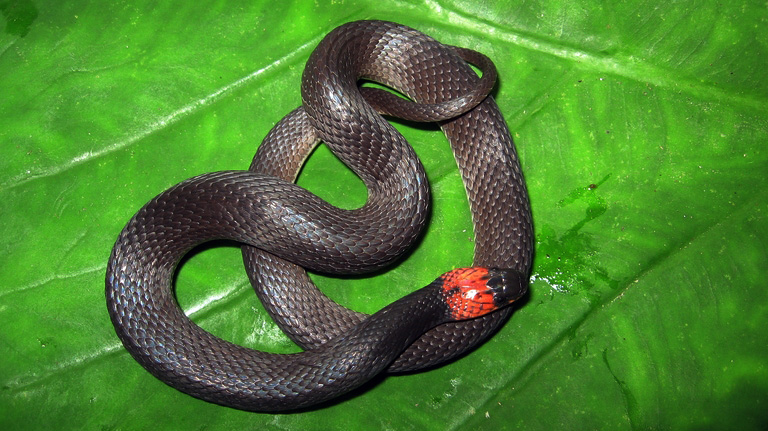
- Hallowell's coffee snake (Ninia atrata)

Scientific classification
- Kingdom: Animalia
- Phylum: Chordata
- Class: Reptilia
- Order: Squamata
- Suborder: Serpentes
- Family: Colubridae
- Subfamily: Dipsadinae
- Genus: Ninia; Baird & Girard, 1853

= Ninia =

Genus of snakes

Ninia, commonly referred to as coffee snakes, is a genus of snakes in the family Colubridae. The genus consists of 12 species that are native to south-eastern Mexico, Central America, and the northern part of South America. Some species are also found on Caribbean islands.

== Species ==
There are 12 species that are recognized as being valid.

Image	Scientific name	Common name	Distribution
	Ninia atrata (Hallowell, 1845)	Hallowell's coffee snake	southern Central America, Ecuador, Venezuela and Trinidad and Tobago
	Ninia celata McCranie & Wilson, 1995		Costa Rica; Panama
	Ninia diademata Baird & Girard, 1853	ringneck coffee snake	Belize; Guatemala; Honduras; Mexico
	Ninia espinali McCranie & Wilson, 1995	Espinal's coffee snake	El Salvador; Honduras
	Ninia franciscoi Angarita-Sierra, 2014	Simla coffee snake	Trinidad
	Ninia guytudori Angarita-Sierra & Arteaga, 2023		Ecuador
	Ninia hudsoni H. Parker, 1940	Guiana coffee snake, Hudson's coffee snake	Guiana, Ecuador (Amazonas), Peru (Pasco, Tambopata, Madre de Dios), Brazil (Rondônia), SW Colombia
	Ninia maculata (W. Peters, 1861)	Pacific banded coffee snake, spotted coffee snake	Costa Rica; Honduras; Nicaragua; Panama
	Ninia pavimentata (Bocourt, 1883)	northern banded coffee snake	Guatemala
	Ninia psephota (Cope, 1876)	red-bellied coffee snake, Cope's coffee snake	Panama, Costa Rica
	Ninia sebae (A.M.C. Duméril, Bibron & A.H.A. Duméril, 1854)	redback coffee snake, culebra de cafetal espalda roja	Mexico and Central America.
	Ninia teresitae Angarita-Sierra & Lynch, 2017		Colombia; Ecuador

Nota bene: A binomial authority in parentheses indicates that the species was originally described in a genus other than Ninia.
