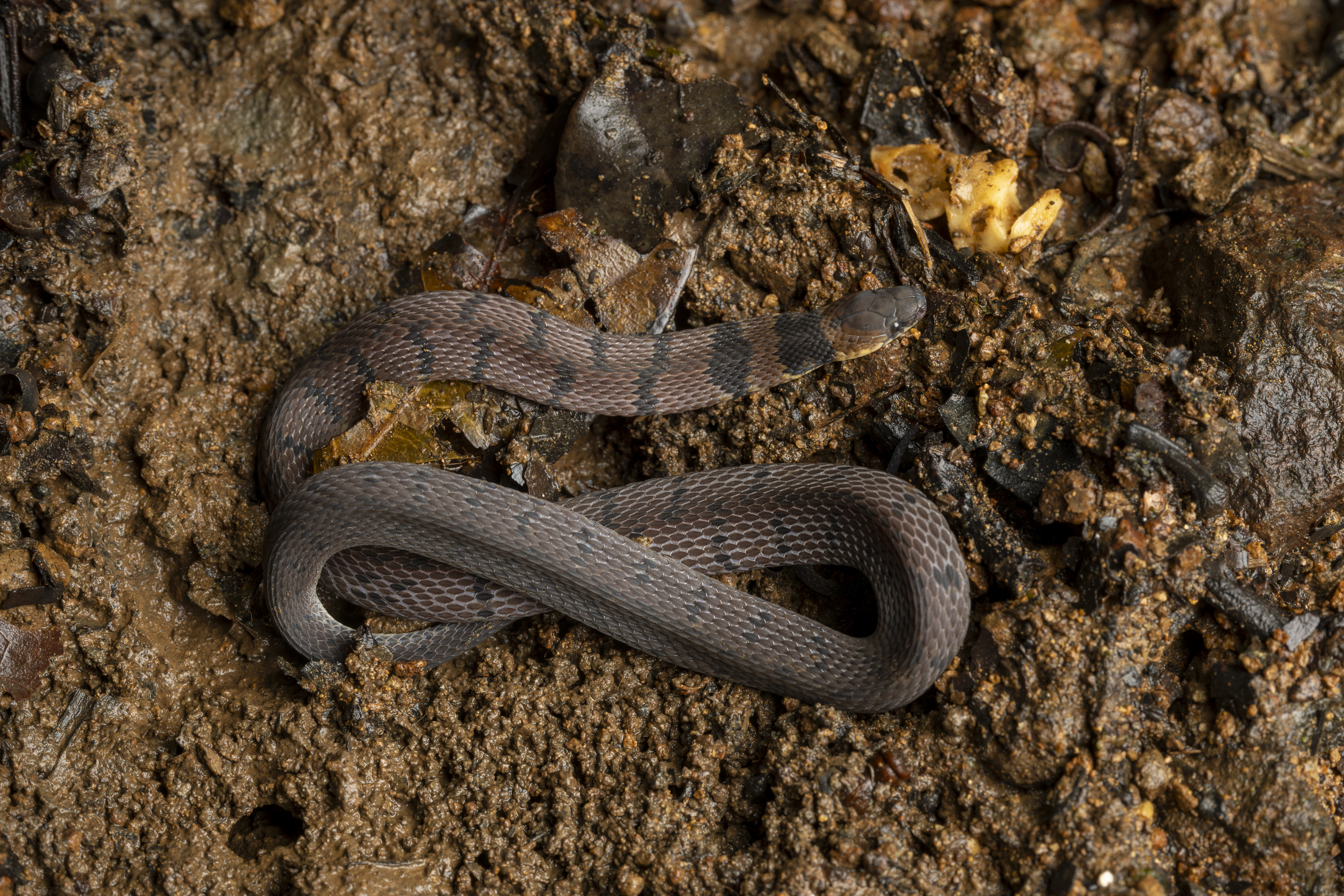

Conservation status
- Least Concern (IUCN 3.1)

Scientific classification
- Kingdom: Animalia
- Phylum: Chordata
- Class: Reptilia
- Order: Squamata
- Suborder: Serpentes
- Family: Colubridae
- Genus: Ninia
- Species: N. maculata

Binomial name
- Ninia maculata (Peters, 1861)

Synonyms
- Streptophorus maculatus Peters, 1861

= Ninia maculata =

Species of snake

Ninia maculata, the Pacific banded coffee snake or spotted coffee snake, is a species of snake in the family Colubridae. The species is native to Guatemala, Honduras, Nicaragua, Costa Rica, and Panama.
