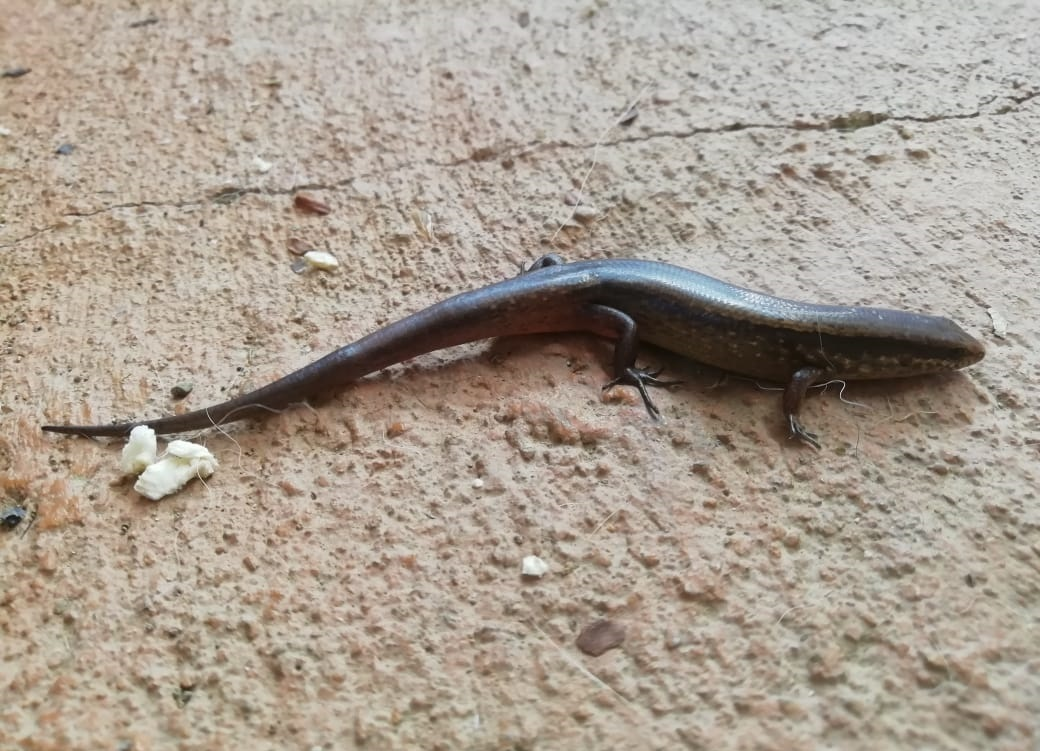

Conservation status
- Least Concern (IUCN 3.1)

Scientific classification
- Kingdom: Animalia
- Phylum: Chordata
- Class: Reptilia
- Order: Squamata
- Family: Scincidae
- Genus: Scincella
- Species: S. cherriei

Binomial name
- Scincella cherriei (Cope, 1893)

Synonyms
- Mocoa cherriei Cope, 1893; Lygosoma assatum cherriei — L. Stuart, 1940; Leiolopisma cherriei — H.M. Smith, 1946; Scincella cherriei — Mittleman, 1950; Lygosoma cherriei — Mertens, 1952; Sphenmorphus cherriei — Greer, 1974; Scincella cherriei — Curlis et al. 2020

= Scincella cherriei =

Species of skink found in Mexico

Scincella cherriei, commonly known as the brown forest skink and Cope's brown forest skink, is a species of lizard in the family Scincidae. The species is native to Central America and adjacent southeastern Mexico. Three subspecies are recognized.

== Etymology ==
The specific name, cherriei, is in honor of George Kruck Cherrie, who was an American naturalist and ornithologist.

The subspecific name, stuarti, is in honor of American herpetologist Laurence Cooper Stuart.

== Geographic range ==
S. cherriei is found in Belize, Costa Rica, El Salvador, Guatemala, Honduras, Mexico (Puebla, Quintana Roo, Tabasco, Veracruz, Yucatán), and Nicaragua.

== Habitat ==
The preferred natural habitat of S. cherriei is forest, at altitudes from sea level to 1,860 m (6,100 ft).

== Diet ==
S. cherriei preys upon small invertebrates.

== Reproduction ==
S. cherriei is oviparous.

== Subspecies ==
The following three subspecies are recognized as being valid, including the nominotypical subspecies.

- Scincella cherriei cherriei (Cope, 1893)
- Scincella cherriei ixbaac (L. Stuart, 1940)
- Scincella cherriei stuarti (H.M. Smith, 1941)

Nota bene: A trinomial authority in parentheses indicates that the subspecies was originally described in a genus other than Scincella.
