= George Kruck Cherrie =

American naturalist and explorer (1865-1948)

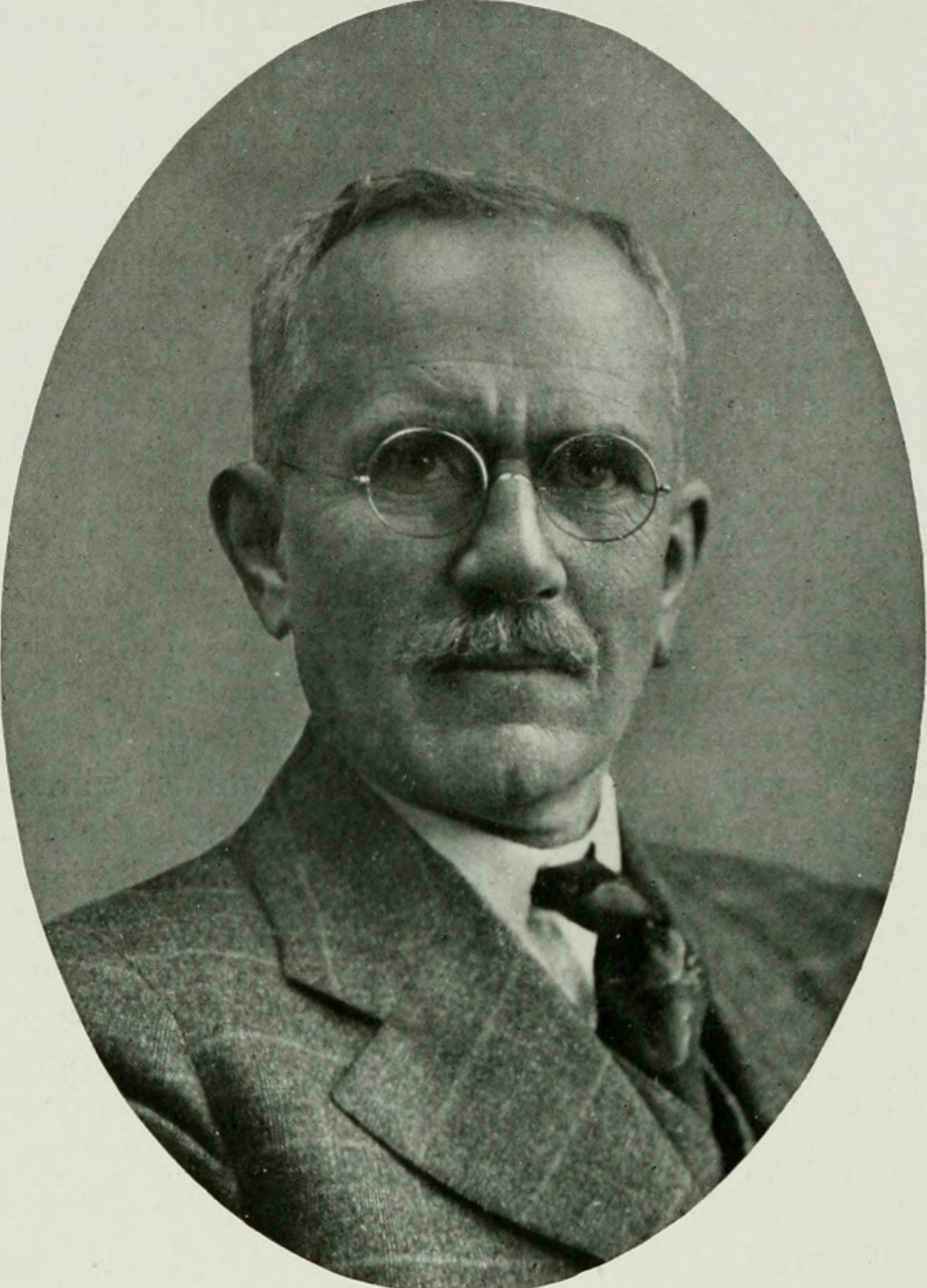
- Cherrie, c. 1917
- Born: August 22, 1865; Knoxville, Iowa
- Died: January 20, 1948 (aged 82); Newfane, Vermont
- Education: Iowa State College
- Occupations: Naturalist, explorer

George Kruck Cherrie (August 22, 1865 – January 20, 1948) was an American naturalist and explorer. He collected numerous specimens on nearly forty expeditions that he joined for museums and several species have been named after him.

== Early life and education ==
Cherrie was born in Knoxville, Iowa. When he was 12, he began working in saw mills before graduating from Iowa State College. He worked briefly at the college museum and then at Ward's Natural Science Establishment in Rochester, New York.

== Career ==
He worked briefly at a Cedar Rapids electric bulb factory before shifting to natural history. Originally educated and employed as a mechanical engineer, he was unsatisfied and decided to study taxonomy and taxidermy instead. Cherrie then left the US and travelled to the West Indies and Central America. During the period 1889–1897, he was employed as a curator of birds at the Costa Rica National Museum in San José and the Field Museum in Chicago. Cherrie collected for the Rothschild Zoological Museum at Tring and the British Museum of Natural History and served on the staff of the Brooklyn Museum and the American Museum of Natural History. He was an assistant Curator of ornithology from 1894 to 1897 at the Chicago Natural History Museum, as the Field Museum was then called. He took part in about forty expeditions, mostly to Central and South America, including Theodore Roosevelt's South American Expedition of 1913–1914, when Cherrie was collecting specimens for the American Museum of Natural History. In 1915, he went to Bolivia with the Alfred Collins-Garnet Day expedition. In 1925, he was the zoological collector for the Simpson-Roosevelts Asiatic Expedition where he accompanied Theodore Roosevelt's sons Kermit and Theodore Jr. and Charles Suydam Cutting.

== Writings and honors ==
Cherrie recounted his experiences in his memoir Dark Trails: Adventures of a Naturalist (1930). He is commemorated in the names of a number of animals: a species of lizard, Scincella cherriei; four species of birds, including Cherrie's tanager; and a species of mammal.

In 1927, the Boy Scouts of America made Cherrie an Honorary Scout, a new category of Scout created that same year. This distinction was given to "American citizens whose achievements in outdoor activity, exploration and worthwhile adventure are of such an exceptional character as to capture the imagination of boys...". The other eighteen men who were awarded this distinction were: Roy Chapman Andrews, Robert Bartlett, Frederick Russell Burnham, Richard E. Byrd, James L. Clark, Merian C. Cooper, Lincoln Ellsworth, Louis Agassiz Fuertes, George Bird Grinnell, Charles A. Lindbergh, Donald Baxter MacMillan, Clifford H. Pope, George Palmer Putnam, Kermit Roosevelt, Carl Rungius, Stewart Edward White, and Orville Wright.

== Personal life ==
Cherrie died on January 20, 1948, in Newfane, Vermont, at the age of 82.
